= Sahrawi Arab Democratic Republic–United States relations =

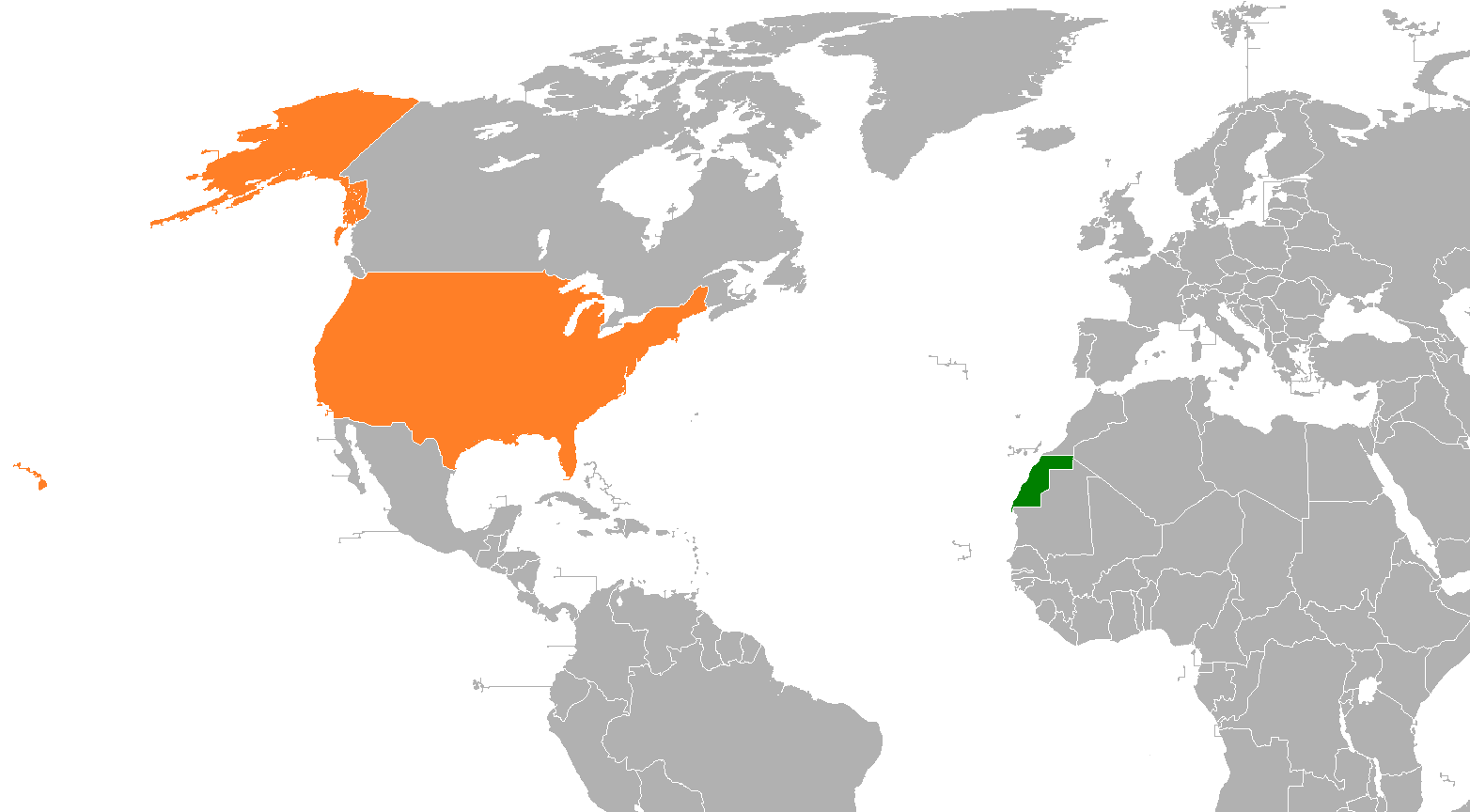

- Sahrawi Arab Democratic Republic: United States

The Sahrawi Arab Democratic Republic and the United States do not have diplomatic relations since 2020, as the US, with the signing of the Israel–Morocco normalization agreement as part of the Abraham Accords, recognized the region of Western Sahara as part of Morocco and the annexation of Western Sahara, making it the first country to do so. Prior to 2020, the informal position of the United States was supporting Morocco's claim to Western Sahara under autonomy for the SADR without formally recognizing Morocco's annexation. The United States has often mediated proposals for both sides to find an amicable solution to the conflict mostly through the United Nations.

== History ==
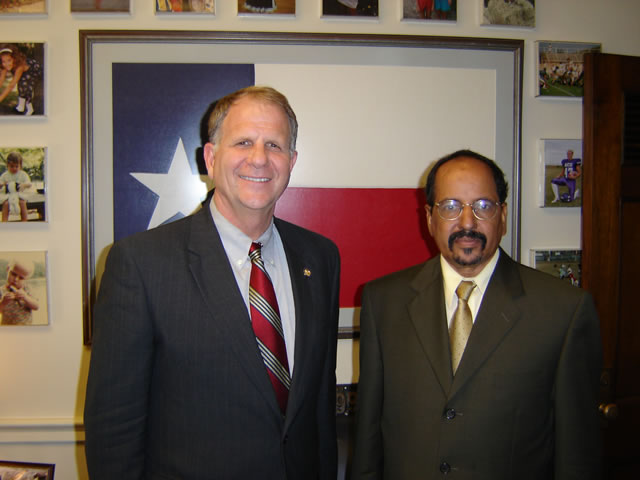
President Mohamed Abdelaziz and US Congressman Ted Poe in 2005.

The SADR declared independence from Spain in 1976 and has since been engaged in a territorial dispute with Morocco.

=== Carter administration ===
In 1978, Jimmy Carter suspended arms sales to Morocco with the pretext being that Morocco had broken the terms of a bilateral military agreement signed in 1960 prohibiting the use of U.S. weapons outside internationally recognized borders. According to The New York Times, the agreement of which was never publicly disclosed. However, the administration in January informed Congress of its intention to resume arms sales to the Moroccans by selling aircraft and helicopters for use in the conflict. In the fall of 1977, a Moroccan delegation came to Washington with a list of arms that it wanted to purchase. The Moroccans had been warning the United States about the Soviet Union's role in North Africa and urged the United States to become more actively involved as did Saudi Arabia and Iran over the Soviet Union's and Cuba's growing influence in the civil wars in Angola and Ethiopia. The decision to do so came in response to tension with then-King Hassan II who was angry over the lack of strong support from the U.S. in the conflict. Hassan acted as an intermediary between Egypt and Israel in 1977 before Egyptian President Anwar Sadat's trip to Jerusalem and refused to accept the Egypt–Israel peace treaty brokered by the Carter administration. And was irritated at the failure of the United States to reciprocate Moroccan military support for Zaire when it was attacked from Angola by former Katangan gendarmes. But American officials were wary of being involved further as Algeria was receiving support from the Soviet Union.

In August 1979, the administration considered selling more arms to the Moroccans, but several of Carter's advisors were split on the policy. The decision to sell the arms was approved on October 22 while also encouraging peace talks between the warring sides, but the U.S. would not have a direct role in any talks.

=== Reagan administration ===
Military aid to Morocco increased under Ronald Reagan without any preconditions viewing the Polisario Front as an ally of the Soviet Union. The administration did not pursue a political solution. In 1982, the administration removed all restrictions on American military equipment being used in the conflict reversing the Carter administration policy. Reagan had asked Congress for $100 million in military sales credits for Morocco. In May, Hassan II visited the U.S. with an agreement reached on the U.S. Air Force using a Moroccan base. The policy was a strategic maneuver to counter Muammar Gaddafi of Libya who provided support to the Polisario Front, his closeness with the Soviet's, and for his sponsoring of terrorist organizations in the MENA region.

=== H.W. Bush administration ===
George H. W. Bush took a neutral approach to the conflict between the SADR and Morocco. Bush publicly called for talks to end the conflict, but at the same time, it continued arms sales to Morocco. The U.S. tried to move the closure of the conflict through the United Nations. During a visit by Hassan II to the U.S. on September 26, 1991, Bush stated he "applaud King Hassan for his courage to agree to the UN Secretary General's plan for a referendum," and expressed "pleasure to see the UN proceeding with its efforts to resolve the Western Sahara dispute with Morocco's support."

=== Clinton administration ===
American policy under Bill Clinton did not change from the previous administration as it maintained neutrality and did not recognize Western Sahara as Moroccan territory. It continued to advocate for Sahrawi autonomy under Morocco. A position that has followed with every administration since.

James Baker, Secretary of State under H.W. Bush, was appointed special envoy for Western Sahara in 1997 for the United Nations proposed two plans named after him called the Baker Plan in 2000, none of which were presented formally to the United Nations Security Council. In the first plan, he proposed autonomy to the region with foreign affairs and defense managed by Morocco. The plan was rejected by Polisario, indicating that any proposal without independence could not be accepted. They also argued that the count of natives should be based on the census of 1975 and not based on migrants from Morocco in the interim period. The second proposal called for a referendum after five years of autonomy. The plan was accepted by Morocco initially, but later rejected quoting that any plan with proposal of independence could not be accepted. The plan was rejected by Morocco and Baker left the position in 2004.

First Baker reviewed the prior proposals and consulted with all parties involved. He, along with Chester Crocker and John Bolton, conducted private talks with Polisario and Morocco along with Algeria and Mauritania acting as observers. Eventually, the talks, which covered the "issues of refugees, reduction of Moroccan troops, prisoners of war and political prisoners," along with an agreement on a code of conduct for the voter registration, eventually led to the Houston Agreement. Voter identification began again on December 3, 1997. A referendum was meant to occur by 1998. However, due to Morocco's refusal to accept the census results, and thus the unlikelihood of accepting the referendum based on the voters proposed, the UN Secretary-General suspended the Settlement Plan.

The Baker Accord was signed at Baker Institute of Public Policy at Rice University in Houston, Texas under the aegis of the United Nations Security Council between September 14 to 16 1997. Both parties signed the final document listing all agreements and was documented as UN doc. S/1997/742 par 4-13. It was the first time in the peace process that any agreement was signed between the rival parties. Morocco wanted to augment the voter list based on the census taken during the Spanish time of the 1970s, while Polisario rejected the proposal, leading to the prevention of the referendum of the accord.

In classified documents released in 2020, Clinton encouraged Morocco to abandon the idea of a referendum in Western Sahara and "opt for a negotiated solution through direct talks with the Polisario." In a memo dated July 25, 1999, penned by National Security Adviser Sandy Berger, outlined Clinton's visit to Rabat for the funeral of Hassan II and his meetings with Mohammed VI, then Moroccan Prime Minister Abderrahmane Youssoufi, Berger emphasized that there was no future of a possible referendum in Western Sahara. Berger stated that the Moroccans wouldn't "countenance any outcome under which it would lose sovereignty over the area" and "In quiet approaches over the past several months, we had encouraged [King] Hassan to opt for a negotiated solution through direct talks with the Polisario." The administration believed that Hassan's death may have been a roadblock to ending the conflict. Nonetheless, the administration convinced Morocco to submit the autonomy and pledged its support.

=== Bush administration ===
George W. Bush supported peace talks between the warring parties mostly through the United Nations. In 2003, the administration backed the Baker Plan which offered two alternative solutions. Granting autonomy to Western Sahara under Morocco with unspecified borders, or accepting the partition of the territory. However, there was no firm position as Bush reiterated that any settlement would not be imposed on Rabat, acknowledging the sensitivity of the issue to Morocco’s internal politics.

Commenting on a 2004 free trade agreement with Morocco, US Trade Representative Robert Zoellick stated in a letter to Congressman Joe Pitts in response to his questioning, "the United States and many other countries do not recognize Moroccan sovereignty over Western Sahara and have consistently urged the parties to work with the United Nations to resolve the conflict by peaceful means. The Free Trade Agreement will not include Western Sahara."

In 2006, the Royal Advisory Council for Saharan Affairs (CORCAS) proposed a plan for the autonomy of Western Sahara and made visits to a number of countries to explain and gather support for their proposal. Citing the Spanish approach to regional autonomy, the Moroccan government plans to model any future agreement after the cases of the Canary Islands, Basque Country, Andalusia, or Catalonia. The plan was presented to the UN Security Council in April 2007 and received the backing of both the United States and France.

In April and October 2007, the Bush administration sought to make the Western Sahara Autonomy Proposal the basis of the U.N.-led political process when it was introduced to the UN in 2006. However, this attempt faced pushback from France, Russia, and then-Secretary General Ban Ki-moon, who feared alienating the Non-Aligned Movement. And that it made no mention of the possibility of independence for Western Sahra. In a 2007 letter to President Bush, 173 members of the US congress endorsed the plan. The UN Security unanimously voted for Resolution 1754 on 30 April 2007, calling for talks of both parties, appreciating the proposal of Morocco and taking note of Polisario's proposal. Based on the proposal, there were four UN-sponsored peace talks between the delegation of Polisario and Morocco 18–19 June 2007, 10–11 August 2007, 7–9 January 2008, and 7–9 January 2008, known as the Manhasset negotiations as they were held in Manhasset, New York.

=== Obama administration ===
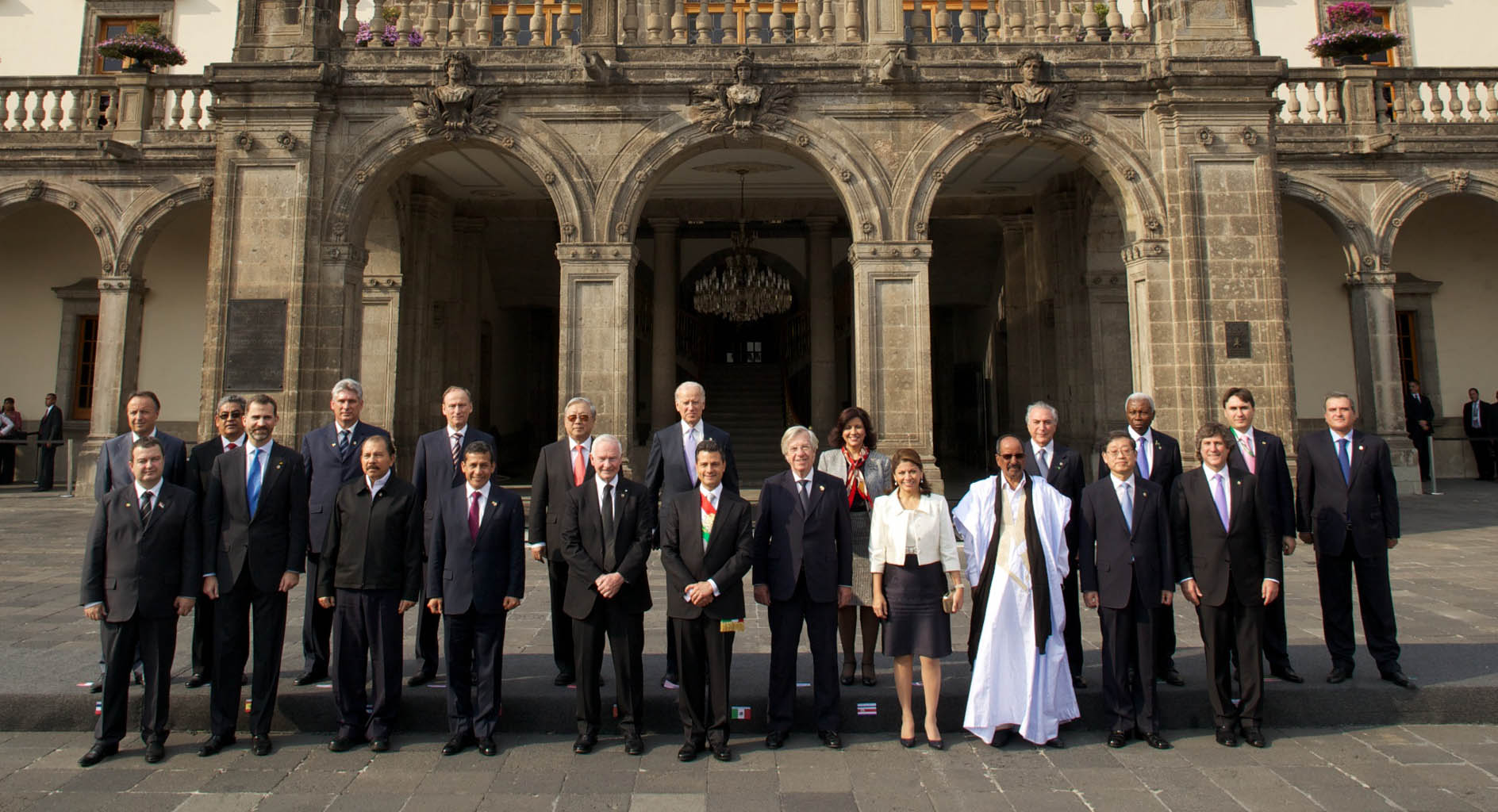
U.S. Vice President Joe Biden (back in center) with world leaders including Mohamed Abdelaziz (third from right in front row) at the inauguration of Enrique Peña Nieto.

Barack Obama at first disassociated the United States from the Moroccan autonomy plan in 2009 reversing the Bush-backed support of the Moroccan plan writing to Mohammed VI supporting U.N. efforts to settle the Sahara dispute. But later returning to a pre-Bush position, wherein the option of an independent Western Sahara was on the table again. Five months later Hillary Clinton, then-Secretary of State, told the Moroccan government during a visit meeting with then-Foreign Minister Taieb Fassi Fihri, "It is important for me to reaffirm here in Morocco that there has been no change in policy." Clinton voiced her support for the autonomy plan calling it "serious, realistic, and credible."

In April 2009, 229 members of the U.S. House of Representatives, a clear majority and more than 50 more than the number who signed the letter in 2007, called on President Obama to support Morocco's autonomy plan and to assist in drawing the conflict to a close. The signers included Democratic Majority Leader Steny Hoyer and Republican Minority Leader John Boehner. In addition to acknowledging that Western Sahara has become a recruiting post for radical Islamists, the letter affirmed that the conflict is "the single greatest obstacle impending the security and cooperation necessary to combat" terrorism in the Maghreb. The letter referenced UN Security Council Resolution 1813 (2008), and encouraged President Obama to follow the policy set by President Clinton and followed by President Bush. The congressmen expressed concerns about Western Sahara's viability. They referenced a UN fact-finding mission to Western Sahara which confirmed the State Department's view that the Polisario proposal, which ultimately stands for independence, would lead to a non-viable state. In closing, the letter stated, "We remain convinced that the U.S. position, favoring autonomy for Western Sahara under Moroccan sovereignty is the only feasible solution. We urge you to both sustain this longstanding policy, and to make clear, in both words and actions, that the United States will work to ensure that the UN process continues to support this framework as the only realistic compromise that can bring this unfortunate and longstanding conflict to an end."

Members of the U.S. Senate, realizing similar "worrisome trends" in the region, also drafted a letter of support for Morocco. In March 2010, a bipartisan majority of U.S. Senators signed a letter to Secretary of State Hillary Clinton calling for the United States to support Morocco's autonomy plan. Similar to the House of Representatives letter to President Obama, the 54 bipartisan Senators (30 Democrats and 24 Republicans) who signed the letter stated concerns about growing instability in the region, including a terrorist threat. The letter openly called on Secretary Clinton and the Obama Administration to provide: "…more sustained American attention to one of the region's most pressing political issues, the Western Sahara." The letter further stated: "As you acknowledged in your remarks in Morocco last November, it has been the policy of the United States to support a resolution of this conflict based on this formula since the Administration of President Clinton. We support this bipartisan U.S. policy and the efforts of the United Nations to bring all parties together to resolve this matter peacefully at the negotiating table." Signers included Senate Intelligence Committee Chairwoman, Senator Dianne Feinstein (D-CA) and ranking Intelligence Committee member Senator Kit Bond (R-MO). In regards to Morocco's autonomy plan, Senator Feinstein said, "The way I feel about it, Morocco has been a staunch ally of the United States, this is a big problem, and this is a reasonable way to settle it."

On September 13, 2012, during the U.S.-Morocco strategic dialogue, Clinton stated that the proposal was "a potential approach that could satisfy the aspirations of the people in the Western Sahara to run their own affairs in peace and dignity." Joe Pitts, Congressman representing Pennsylvania, said that under Clinton the State Department became less sympathetic to the Sahrawis.

After Clinton stepped down as Secretary of State in February 2013, John Kerry, former Senator from Massachusetts became her successor, a leaked 2012 Moroccan government cable expressed concern claiming it had "an ally who will be difficult to replace." Kerry in 2001 signed a letter to the State Department expressing support for an independence referendum in Western Sahara and asserting "the personal dispensation remains a major element that can sometimes weigh in our favor or disfavor." Another leaked cable in 2012 from the Moroccan Embassy in Washington, D.C., asserted that "there will be changes at the State Department after the departure of Hillary Clinton that will require the implementation of a new strategy, both aggressive and enterprising in order to confirm the current U.S. position on the Sahara issue and also strengthen the position of our country as a privileged interlocutor of the United States."

In April 2013, the United States proposed that United Nations Mission for the Referendum in Western Sahara monitor human rights (as all the other UN missions since 1991) in Western Sahara, a move that Morocco strongly opposed, canceling the annual African Lion military exercises with U.S. Army troops. Also in mid-April, United States Ambassador to Morocco Samuel L. Kaplan declared during a conference in Casablanca that the Moroccan autonomy plan "can't be the only basis in these negotiations", referring to the UN-sponsored talks between the Polisario Front and Morocco.

On November 22, 2013, Mohammed VI visited the United States and held a bilateral meeting with Barack Obama where both delegations in a joint statement affirmed to find a peaceful, sustainable, mutually agreed-upon solution to the conflict. The administration stated in a joint statement with the Moroccans, "The United States has made clear that Morocco's autonomy plan is serious, realistic, and credible, and that it represents a potential approach that could satisfy the aspirations of the people in the Western Sahara to run their own affairs in peace and dignity. We continue to support the negotiations carried out by the United Nations, including the work of the UN Secretary-General's Personal Envoy Ambassador Christopher Ross, and urge the parties to work toward a resolution."

On December 16, 2014, Obama signed the Consolidated and Further Continuing Appropriations Act, 2015, which strengthened the US mandate for assistance to Morocco to be used in Western Sahara. The bill stated, "Funds appropriated under Title III of this Act shall be made available for assistance for the Western Sahara."

In 2016, controversy ensued when the State Department approved a one million dollar grant to the Moroccan government for the purpose of civil society and local governance programs in Western Sahara. The funds came from the passage of Consolidated Appropriations Act, 2016 after lobbyists for Morocco convinced Congress to legislate foreign aid to be spent in Western Sahara.

=== Trump administration ===
On 10 December 2020, President Donald Trump announced that the United States would officially recognize Morocco's claims over Western Sahara, in exchange for Morocco agreeing to normalize relations with Israel. U.N. Secretary-General António Guterres welcomed the agreement, but reserved judgment on Western Sahara, according to a spokesman. The UN said that its position on Western Sahara was "unchanged" following the US announcement, with a spokesperson of Guterres suggesting that "the solution to the question can still be found based on Security Council resolutions." On December 21, 2020, following a closed-door session of the security council, the South African ambassador said, "We believe that any recognition of Western Sahara as part of Morocco is tantamount to recognizing illegality as such recognition is incompatible with international law."

=== Biden administration ===
On April 30, 2021, it was revealed that Secretary of State Antony Blinken told Morocco's Foreign Minister Nasser Bourita in a phone call that the Biden administration had no intention of reversing the Trump administration's recognition of Morocco's sovereignty over Western Sahara. Ten days earlier, Brett McGurk, the National Security Council Coordinator for the Middle East and North Africa, spoke to Bourita offering no change in the position.

== See also ==
- Foreign relations of the Sahrawi Arab Democratic Republic
- Foreign relations of the United States
- International recognition of the Sahrawi Arab Democratic Republic
- Political status of Western Sahara
- Morocco–United States relations

== Sources ==
- King, Stephen J. (2014). "The Emergence and Politics of the Polisario Front". In Boukhars, Anouar; Roussellier, Jacques (eds.). Perspectives on Western Sahara: Myths, Nationalisms, and Geopolitics. New York: Rowman & Littlefield. ISBN 9781442226852.
- Theofilopoulou, Anna (July 2006). "The United Nations and Western Sahara: A Never-ending Affair" (PDF). United States Institute of Peace Special Report. 166. Archived from the original (PDF) on July 1, 2015.
