= Western Sahara peace process =

International efforts to resolve the Western Sahara conflict

The Western Sahara peace process refers to international efforts to resolve the Western Sahara conflict. The conflict has failed so far to result in permanent peace between Morocco and the Polisario Front (including its self-declared Sahrawi Arab Democratic Republic). The standing issues of the peace process include Sahrawi refugees (specifically Sahrawi refugee camps in Algeria) and human rights in Western Sahara.

== Background ==
The Western Sahara conflict is an ongoing conflict between the Polisario Front of the Sahrawi people and the state of Morocco. The conflict is the continuation of Polisario's past insurgency against the Spanish colonial forces in 1973–1975 and of the subsequent Western Sahara War between the Polisario and Morocco (1975–1991). Today, the conflict is dominated by unarmed civil campaigns of the Polisario Front and their self-proclaimed SADR state to gain fully recognized independence for Western Sahara.

The conflict escalated after Spain withdrew from the Spanish Sahara in accordance with the Madrid Accords. Beginning in 1975, the Polisario Front, backed by Algeria, waged a 16-year-long war for independence against Mauritania and Morocco. In February 1976, the Polisario Front declared the establishment of the Sahrawi Arab Democratic Republic, which was not admitted to the United Nations but won limited recognition from several other states. Following the annexation of Western Sahara by Morocco and Mauritania in 1976, and the Polisario Front's declaration of independence, the UN addressed the conflict with a resolution reaffirming the Sahrawi people's right to self-determination. In 1977, France intervened, as the conflict reached its peak intensity. In 1979, Mauritania withdrew from the conflict and territories, leading to a stalemate through most of the 1980s. After several more engagements between 1989 and 1991, a cease-fire agreement was reached between the Polisario Front and the Moroccan government. At the time, most of Western Sahara's territory remained under Moroccan control, while the Polisario claimed to control some 20% of the territory, even though it is a MINURSO zone, with additional pockets of control in the Sahrawi refugee camps along the Algerian border. At present, these borders are largely unchanged.

Despite multiple peace initiatives through the 1990s and early 2000s, the conflict reemerged as the "Independence Intifada" in 2005; a series of disturbances, demonstrations, and riots, which broke out in May 2005 in the Moroccan-held portions of Western Sahara, and lasted until November of that same year. In late 2010, the protests re-erupted in the Gdeim Izik refugee camp in Western Sahara. While the protests were initially peaceful, they were later marked by clashes between civilians and security forces, resulting in dozens of casualties on both sides. Another series of protests began on 26 February 2011, in response to the police's failure to prevent anti-Sahrawi looting in the city of Dakhla, Western Sahara; the protests soon spread throughout the territory. Though sporadic demonstrations continued, the movement had largely subsided by May 2011.

== Demographic issues ==
Following the 1975 Green March, the Moroccan state has sponsored settlement schemes enticing thousands of Moroccans of Sahraoui origin to move into the Moroccan-occupied part of Western Sahara (80% of the territory). By 2015, it was estimated that Moroccan settlers made up at least two-thirds of the 500,000 inhabitants. In addition to guaranteeing a right of return for the Sahrawi refugees, the Sahrawi government in exile has indicated a willingness to offer Sahrawi citizenship to Moroccan settlers and their descendants in a future independent state.

== Peace process chronology ==
- International Court of Justice Advisory Opinion on Western Sahara 1975
- 1975 United Nations visiting mission to Spanish Sahara
- United Nations Mission for the Referendum in Western Sahara (1991)
- Settlement Plan (1991)
- Houston Agreement (1997)
- Baker Plan (2000 and 2003)
- Manhasset negotiations (2007–2008)

== See also ==
- Israeli–Palestinian peace process
