= List of modern conflicts in North Africa =

Incidents since 1918 with more than 100 casualties

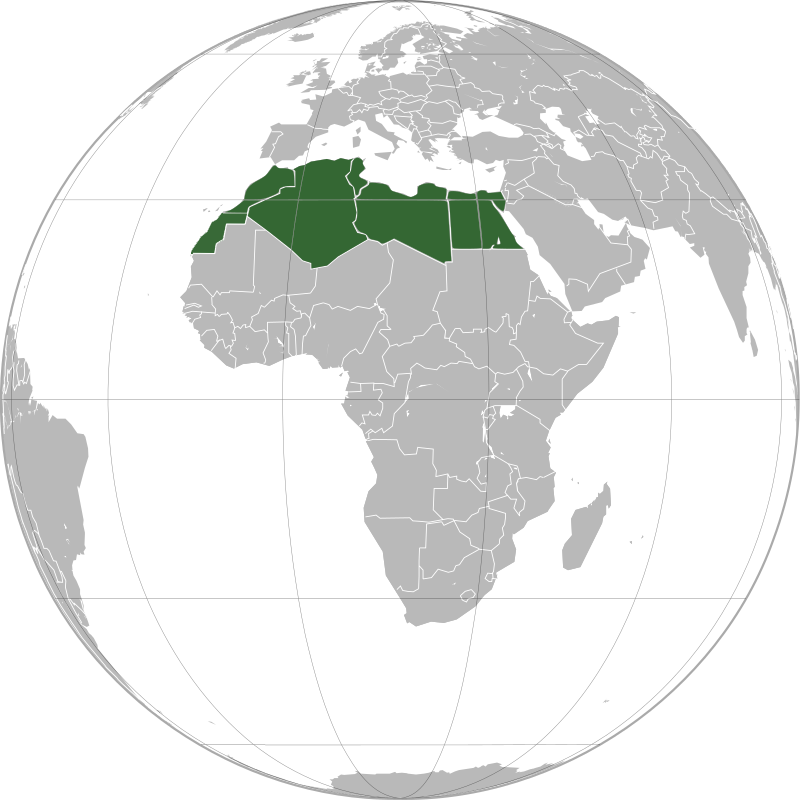
Northern Africa

Note:

- "Modern" is defined as post-WWI period, from 1918 until today.
- "North Africa" has a definition approximately that of the Arab term Maghreb, in addition to Egypt
- "Conflict" is defined as a separate 100+ casualty incident.
- In all cases conflicts are listed by total deaths, including subconflicts (specified below).

== List of conflicts ==
Indicates conflict is ongoing

Date	Conflict	Location	Casualties
1919	Egyptian Revolution of 1919	Egypt	800–3,000
1920–1926	Rif War	Republic of the Rif	40,000–46,400
1940–1943	Mediterranean, Middle East and African theatres of World War II	Algeria, Egypt, Libya, Morocco, Tunisia	900,000
1945	1945 Tripoli pogrom	British Tripolitania	140
1946	Egyptian Student Riots	Egypt	48
1952	Egyptian Revolution of 1952	Egypt	1,000
1952–1954	Tunisian War of Independence	Tunisia	2,500
1955–1972	First Sudanese Civil War	Sudan	500,000
1954–1962	Algerian War of Independence	Algeria	400,000–1,500,000
1957–1958	Ifni War	Morocco, Spanish West Africa	8,400
1958–1959	1958 Rif riots	Morocco	~4000
1961	Bizerte crisis	Tunisia	654
1961–1964	First Tuareg rebellion	Mali, Niger	
1963–1964	Sand War	Morocco, Algeria	339
1963–1965	Socialist Forces Front Kabyle rebellion	Algeria	400
1965–1979	Civil war in Chad	Chad	500+
1970–present	Western Sahara conflict^{[b]}	Mauritania, Morocco, Sahrawi Arab Democratic Republic	14,000–21,000
1977	Libyan–Egyptian War	Egypt, Libya	500
1978–1987	Chadian–Libyan conflict	Libya, Chad	8,500
1979–1982	Civil conflict in Chad	Chad	
1982–2002	Chadian Civil War	Chad	37,500
1983–2005	Second Sudanese Civil War	Sudan	600,000–2,500,000
1983–1984	Tunisian bread riots	Tunisia	150
1986	Bombing of Libya (1986)	Libya	100
1986	1986 Egyptian Conscription Riot	Egypt	107
1987	Executions by Abu Nidal's organization	Libya	150–160
1990–1995	Tuareg Rebellion (1990–1995)^{[c]}	Mali, Niger	650-1,500
1992–2000	Terrorism in Egypt	Egypt	1,300–2,000
1992–2002	Algerian Civil War	Algeria	100,000–200,000
2001–2002	Black Spring (Kabylie)	Algeria	123
2002–present	Insurgency in the Maghreb	Morocco, Algeria, Mauritania, Niger, Mali	6,000
2003–2020	War in Darfur	Sudan	100,000–330,000
2005–2010	Civil war in Chad (2005–2010)	Chad, Sudan	1,140
2007–2009	Tuareg Rebellion (2007–2009)	Mali, Niger	350–1,330
2009–present	Sudanese nomadic conflicts	Sudan, South Sudan	3,000–3,500
2010–2011	Tunisian Revolution	Tunisia	338
2011–2020	Sudan–SPLM-N conflict	Sudan	1,500
2011–2014	Egyptian Crisis (2011–2014)	Egypt	4,686–4,687^{[d]}
2011–present	Libyan Crisis (2011–present)	Libya	40,000+^{[e]}
2011–2013	2011–2013 Sudanese protests	Sudan	200+
2012–present	Northern Mali conflict	Mali	2,000+

== Casualties breakdown ==
North African Campaign (WWII) – combined figure ~430,000 killed:

- Western Desert Campaign – 50,000 casualties
- Battle of Cape Bon – 900+ casualties
- Raid on Alexandria (1941) – 8 casualties
- Action off Cape Bougaroun – 27 killed
- Mers al-Kbir – 1,299 killed
- Operation Torch – 1,825 killed
- Tunisia campaign – ~376,000 killed

Western Sahara conflict (1970–present) combined casualty figure 14,000–21,000+:

- Western Sahara War – 7,000 Moroccan, Mauritianian and French soldiers killed; 4,000 Sahrawi People's Liberation Army soldiers killed; 3,000 civilians killed
- Second Sahrawi Intifada – 1 killed
- Gdeim Izik protest camp – 18–36 killed
- 2011 Sahrawi protests – 1 killed
- Western Saharan clashes (2020–present) - 66 killed

Tuareg rebellion (1990–1995) combined casualties at least 650–1,500:

- Tchin-Tabaradene massacre – 650–1,500 civilians killed

Egyptian Crisis (2011–2014) combined casualty figure 4,686–4,687:

- 2011 Egyptian Revolution – 846 killed
- Aftermath of the Egyptian Revolution – 300 killed
- Timeline of the Egyptian Crisis under Mohamed Morsi – 127–128 killed
- Post-coup unrest in Egypt (2013–2014) – 3,143 killed
- Insurgency in Egypt (2013–present) – 570 killed

Libyan Crisis (2011–present) combined casualty figure 40,000+:

- First Libyan Civil War – 25,000–30,000 killed
- Factional violence in Libya (2011–2014) – over 1,000 killed
- Second Libyan Civil War – thousands killed

== See also ==
- List of conflicts in Africa
- List of modern conflicts in the Middle East
