= Western Sahara conflict =

Ongoing armed conflict in North Africa

- Part of the Decolonisation of Africa
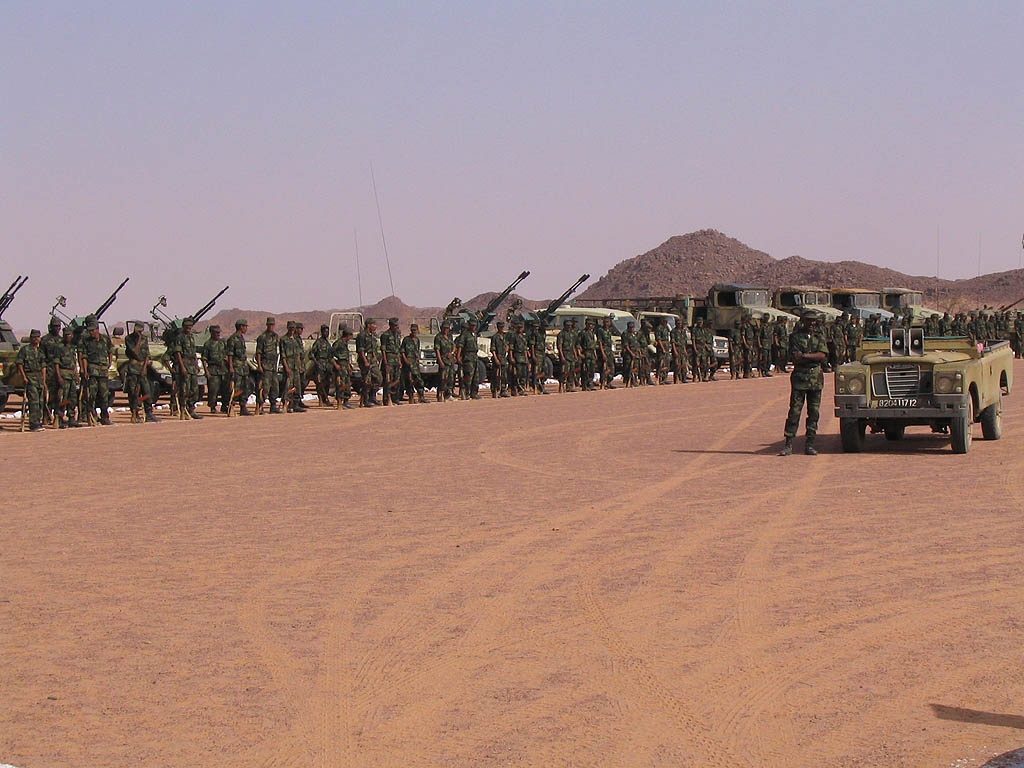
- Gathering of Sahrawi troops, near Tifariti (Western Sahara), celebrating the 32nd anniversary of the Polisario Front (2005)
Date	17 June 1970 – present (56 years, 4 months, 3 weeks and 6 days)
Location	Western Sahara
Status	Ongoing: Zemla Intifada (1970); Sahrawi insurgency (1973–1976); Invasion and occupation of Western Sahara (1975); Western Sahara War (1975–1991); Annexation of Western Sahara by Morocco and Mauritania; Mauritanian withdrawal (1979); First Sahrawi Intifada (1999–2004); Second Sahrawi Intifada (2005); Moroccan Western Sahara Wall built by Morocco; Protests erupt against Morocco in Western Sahara (2011); End of ceasefire (2020)

Belligerents
Francoist Spain (1970–1975); France (1977–1978); Morocco; Mauritania (1975–1979)	Sahrawi Republic; Algeria

Commanders and leaders
(Morocco) Mohammed VI; (Morocco) Fatima Ezzahra El Mansouri; (Morocco) Abdellatif Loudiyi; (Morocco) Mohammed Berrid; Former commanders: (Morocco) Hassan II #; (Morocco) Ahmed Laraki; (Morocco) Mohammed Karim Lamrani; (Morocco) Ahmed Osman; (Morocco) Maati Bouabid; (Morocco) Azzeddine Laraki; (Morocco) Abdellatif Filali; (Morocco) Abderrahmane Youssoufi; (Morocco) Driss Jettou; (Morocco) Abbas El Fassi; (Morocco) Abdelilah Benkirane; (Morocco) Saadeddine Othmani; (Morocco) Aziz Akhannouch; (Morocco) Ahmed Dlimi #; (Morocco) Abdelhak Kadiri; (Morocco) Abdelaziz Bennani; (Morocco) Bouchaib Arroub; (Morocco) Abdelfattah Louarak; (Spain) Francisco Franco #; (Mauritania) Mokhtar Ould Daddah; (Mauritania) Mustafa Ould Salek; (France) Valéry Giscard d'Estaing	(Sahrawi Arab Democratic Republic) Brahim Ghali (2016–present); (Sahrawi Arab Democratic Republic) Mohamed Abdelaziz # (1976–2016); (Sahrawi Arab Democratic Republic) El-Ouali Mustapha Sayed † (1976); (Sahrawi Arab Democratic Republic) Lahbib Ayoub (until 2002); (Algeria) Houari Boumediène # (1970–78)

Strength
(Spain) 3,000 troops (1973); (Morocco) 30,000 (1976); 150,000 (1988); (Mauritania) 3,000–5,000 (1976); 18,000 (1978)	5,000 (1976)

Casualties and losses
Unknown; 2,155–2,300 captured; (Mauritania) 2,000 soldiers killed	Unknown
- Total: 14,000–21,000 killed overall; 40,000 (1976), 80,000 (1977) refugees

The Western Sahara conflict is an ongoing conflict between the Sahrawi Arab Democratic Republic (SADR) and the Kingdom of Morocco. The conflict originated from an insurgency by the Polisario Front against Spanish colonial forces from 1973 to 1975 and the subsequent Western Sahara War against Morocco between 1975 and 1991. Today the conflict is dominated by unarmed civil campaigns of the Polisario Front and their self-proclaimed SADR state to gain fully recognized independence for Western Sahara.

The conflict escalated after the withdrawal of Spain from the Spanish Sahara in accordance with the Madrid Accords. Beginning in 1975, the Polisario Front, backed and supported by Algeria, waged a 16-year-long war for independence against Mauritania and Morocco. In February 1976, the Polisario Front declared the establishment of the Sahrawi Arab Democratic Republic, which was not admitted into the United Nations, but won limited recognition by a number of other states. Following the annexation of Western Sahara by Morocco and Mauritania in 1976, and the Polisario Front's declaration of independence, the UN addressed the conflict via a resolution reaffirming the right to self-determination of the Sahrawi people. In 1977, France intervened as the conflict reached its peak intensity. In 1979, Mauritania withdrew from the conflict and territories, leading to a stalemate through most of the 1980s. The Polisario Front and the Moroccan government reached a cease-fire agreement after several more engagements between 1989 and 1991. At the time, most of the Western Sahara remained under Moroccan control, while the Polisario controlled some 30% of the territory in its capacity as the Sahrawi Arab Democratic Republic. At present, these borders are largely unchanged.

Despite multiple peace initiatives through the 1990s and early 2000s, the conflict reemerged as the "Independence Intifada" in 2005; a series of disturbances, demonstrations and riots, which broke out in May 2005 in the Moroccan-held portions of Western Sahara, and lasted until November of that same year. In late 2010, protests over social and economic conditions erupted in the Gdeim Izik refugee camp in Western Sahara. While the protests were initially peaceful, they were later marked by clashes between civilians and security forces, resulting in dozens of casualties on both sides. Another series of protests began on 26 February 2011, as a reaction to the failure of police to prevent anti-Sahrawi looting in the city of Dakhla, Western Sahara; protests soon spread throughout the territory. Though sporadic demonstrations continue, the movement had largely subsided by May 2011.

To date, large parts of Western Sahara are controlled by the Moroccan government and known as the Southern Provinces, whereas some 30% of the Western Sahara territory remains controlled by the Sahrawi Arab Democratic Republic (SADR), the Polisario state with limited international recognition. The questions of mutual recognition, establishment of a possible Sahrawi state and the large numbers of Sahrawi refugees displaced by the conflict are among the key issues of the ongoing Western Sahara peace process.

== History ==
=== Spanish Sahara ===
In 1884, Spain claimed a protectorate over the coast from Cape Bojador to Cape Blanc. Later, the Spanish extended their area of control. In 1958, Spain merged the previously separate districts of Saguia el-Hamra (in the north) and Río de Oro (in the south) to form the province of Spanish Sahara.

Raids and rebellions by the indigenous Sahrawi population kept the Spanish forces out of much of the Spanish-claimed territory for a long time. Ma al-Aynayn the Saharan pro-Moroccan caïd of Tindouf and Smara named by the Moroccan sultan started an uprising against the French in 1910 in response to French attempts to expand their influence and control in North-West Africa. Ma al-Aynayn died in October 1910, and his son El Hiba succeeded him. El Hiba's forces were defeated during a failed campaign to conquer Marrakesh, and in retaliation French colonial forces destroyed the holy city of Smara in 1913. The city was promptly rebuilt, and Sahrawi resistance continued for the following twenty years. The rebellious territory was finally subdued in 1934, after joint Spanish and French forces destroyed Smara for a second time. In 1956, the Ifni War, initiated by the Moroccan Army of Liberation, marked renewed conflict in the region; after two years of war, the Spanish forces regained control, again with French aid. However, unrest lingered among the region's population, and in 1967 the Harakat Tahrir arose to challenge Spanish rule peacefully. After the events of the Zemla Intifada in 1970, when Spanish police forcibly disbanded the organization and "disappeared" its founder, Muhammad Bassiri, Sahrawi nationalism again swung towards militarism.

=== Polisario Front ===
The group was preceded by an earlier separatist group called Movement for the Liberation of Saguia el Hamra and Wadi el Dhahab. In 1971, a group of young Sahrawi students in the universities of Morocco began organizing what came to be known as The Embryonic Movement for the Liberation of Saguia el-Hamra and Rio de Oro. After attempting in vain to gain backing from several Arab governments, including both Algeria and Morocco itself, the movement only succeeded in obtaining support from Libya and Mauritania. As a result of this ambivalence, the movement eventually relocated to Spanish-controlled Western Sahara to start an armed rebellion. Women in Western Sahara are prominent members of the Polisario Front as soldiers and activists.

A UN mission in June 1975 declared that there was "overwhelming consensus" in support of Sahrawi independence and that the Polisario front was the most powerful political force in country. The group established a close relationship with Algeria in 1975. In 1976, Algeria called the Moroccan takeover of Western Sahara a "slow, murderous" invasion.

== Conflict ==
=== Beginnings of armed struggle ===
The Polisario Front was formally constituted on 10 May 1973 in the Mauritanian city of Zouirate, with the express intention of militarily forcing an end to Spanish colonization. Its first Secretary General was El-Ouali Mustapha Sayed, who led an armed insurgency against Spanish colonization. On 20 May he led the Khanga raid, the Polisario's first armed action, in which a Spanish post manned by a team of Tropas Nomadas (Sahrawi-staffed auxiliary forces) was overrun and a cache of rifles seized. The Polisario gradually gained control over large swaths of the Western Saharan desert, and its power grew steadily after early 1975 when the Tropas Nomadas began deserting en masse to the Polisario Front, bringing their weapons and training with them. At this point, the maximum extent of the Polisario Front's manpower included perhaps 800 men, but they were backed by a larger network of supporters. The 1975 United Nations visiting mission to Spanish Sahara, headed by Simeon Aké, concluded that Sahrawi support for independence (as opposed to Spanish rule or integration with a neighboring country) amounted to an "overwhelming consensus" and that the Polisario Front was by far the most powerful political force in the country.

=== Western Sahara War ===
The Western Sahara War was an armed conflict, lasting from 1975 to 1991, fought primarily between the Polisario Front and Morocco. The conflict erupted after the withdrawal of Spain from the Spanish Sahara in accordance with the Madrid Accords, by which it agreed to give administrative control of the territory to Morocco and Mauritania. The Polisario Front, backed by Algeria and Libya, desiring instead the establishment an independent Sahrawi state in the territory, fought both Mauritania and Morocco in quick succession, in an attempt to drive their forces out of the region. In 1979, Mauritania withdrew its forces from the disputed territory, and the Polisario Front and Morocco reached a ceasefire agreement in 1991. The war resulted in somewhere between 14,000 and 21,000 casualties between both sides.. Some 40,000–80,000 Sahrawi refugees were displaced as a result of the conflict; at present, most still reside in various Sahrawi refugee camps throughout the Tindouf province of Algeria.

=== First Sahrawi Intifada ===
The First Sahrawi Intifada began in 1999 and lasted until 2004, transforming into the Independence Intifada in 2005. The First Sahrawi Intifada formed a part of the wider and still ongoing Western Sahara conflict.

=== Independence Intifada ===
The Independence Intifada or the Second Sahrawi Intifada (intifada is Arabic for "uprising") and also May Intifada is a Sahrawi activist term for a series of disturbances, demonstrations and riots which broke out in May 2005 in the Moroccan-controlled parts of Western Sahara. During the events one civilian was killed and hundreds wounded.

=== Gdeim Izik and Arab Spring protests ===
The Gdeim Izik protest camp was established in Western Sahara on 9 October 2010 and lasted into November, with related incidents occurring in the aftermath of its dismantlement on 8 November 2010. According to Human Rights Watch, the Moroccan security forces moved to dismantle the Gdeim Izik tent camp. Approximately 6,500 tents Sahrawis had erected in early October to protest their social and economic conditions in Moroccan-controlled Western Sahara. While protests were initially peaceful, they were later marked by clashes between civilians and security forces. Eleven security officers and at least two civilians were killed, by official count. Many public and private buildings and vehicles were burned in the city.

In 2011, new protests erupted again on 26 February, as a reaction to the failure of police to prevent anti-Sahrawi looting and rioting in the city of Dakhla, Western Sahara, and blossomed into protests across the territory. These protests are considered the Western Saharan branch of the Arab Spring series of popular demonstrations and uprisings. Despite an initial outburst of support, the 2011 protests largely subsided on their own by May 2011.

=== End of ceasefire ===
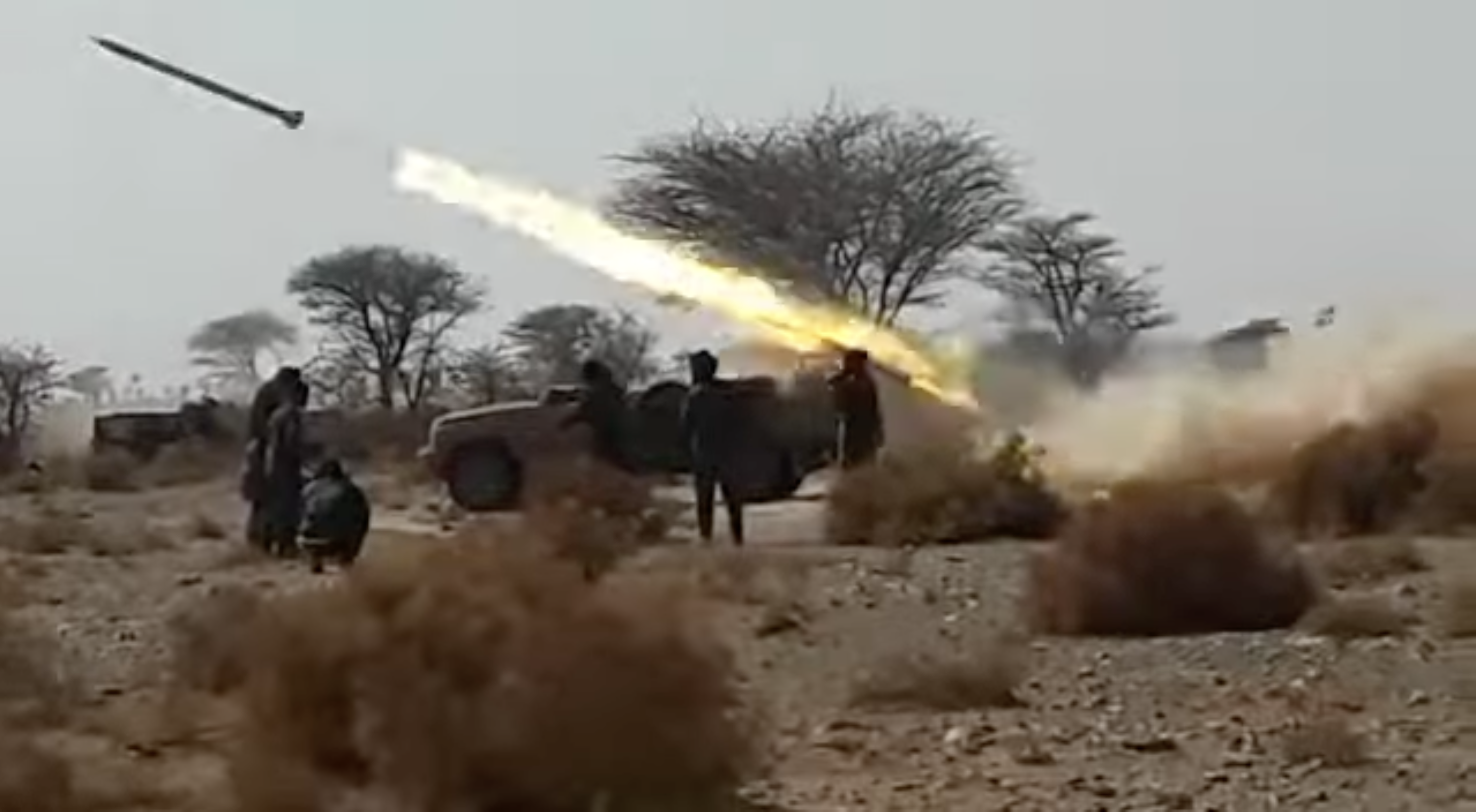
Shelling attack launched by the Sahrawi People's Liberation Army (2021).

On 14 November 2020, SADR president Brahim Ghali announced that he had signed a decree bringing the 29 year old ceasefire to an end, citing an incident two days prior in which the Moroccan army forcibly entered a crossing within the buffer zone that was being blocked by protesters—acts which the SADR considered a declaration of war. The SADR claims the Moroccan-built road is illegal, as it was built after the 1991 United Nations-brokered truce. Morocco, however, claims that it will still abide by the ceasefire and alleges that the army was simply trying to re-open the road to traffic. The Sahara Press Service later said that Polisario fighters had attacked Moroccan positions along different parts of the frontline, which stretches hundreds of miles across the desert. The Moroccan government has not yet commented on these claims.

== Foreign actors ==
=== Algeria ===
Algeria sees itself as an "important actor" in the conflict, and officially supports the right of the Sahrawi people to self-determination. The efforts invested by Algeria in the Western Sahara conflict, especially at the level of its international relations, are comparable to the ones of an involved party such as Morocco.

Morocco's position is that Algeria is part of the conflict and uses the Sahara issue for geopolitical interests that date from the Cold War, claiming that this country in its official communication to the United Nations "presents itself sometimes as 'a concerned party,' other times as an 'important actor,' or as a 'party' in the settlement of the dispute". The United Nations has only ever officially considered Morocco and the Polisario Front parties to the conflict, however acknowledges that other interests may also be involved.

Although the United Nations officially considers Morocco and the Polisario Front as the main parties to the conflict, former UN Secretary-General Mr. Kofi Annan viewed Algeria as a stakeholder in the Western Sahara conflict and has invited Algeria, "to engage as a party in these discussions and to negotiate, under the auspices of my Kofi Annan's Personal Envoy". In an interview with the Public Broadcasting Service, in August 2004, James Baker, former personal envoy of the United Nations Secretary to Western Sahara, identified Morocco and Algeria as being both the "two chief protagonists" of the conflict. Some third parties have called for both Morocco and Algeria to negotiate directly to find a solution for the conflict. Since 2018, negotiations led by the UN, have included Geneva roundtables gathered by Personal Envoy Horst Köhler. This involved delegations from Morocco, the Polisario Front, Algeria, and Mauritania. While Algeria participated in the discussions, it maintained its position as an observer, instead of being directly involved in the conflict. The initial roundtable was held on 5–6 December 2018, followed by a second session on 21–22 March 2019.

The refugee camps are located in Algeria and the country has armed, trained, and financed the Polisario for more than thirty years. More than two thousand Moroccan prisoners of war were previously detained on Algerian soil in Polisario camps, but all POWs have since been released.

In response to the Green March and the ongoing disputed status of Western Sahara, Algeria has expropriated the property of and forcibly expelled tens of thousands of Moroccan civilians since 1975. This remains a source of much tension between the two countries.

Even though Algeria has no official claim to Western Sahara, some experts see that the Sahara conflict represents a domestic political issue for the country. Stressing the role played by Algerian officers in allegedly interrogating and torturing the Moroccan POWs, France Libertés states in its report on The Conditions of Detentions of the Moroccan POWs Detained in Tindouf (Algeria) that "the involvement of Algeria in the conflict is well known". In March 2003 Khaled Nezzar, an Algerian retired general, referred to the conflict as being an issue only between Morocco and Algeria.

In January and February 1976, there were direct battles in Amgala between the armies of these two countries. Morocco claims to have captured "dozens of Algerian officers and non-commissioned officers and soldiers" during these confrontations, but has released them to Algerian authorities.

=== Libya ===
Libya under Muammar Gaddafi (1976–1984) backed the SADR against Morocco.

=== Spain ===
In 2011, Spanish Foreign Minister Trinidad Jiménez called for a U.N. committee to evaluate the security situation in the Polisario-controlled refugee camps in Tindouf (Algeria) and probe possible corruption in the distribution of international aid there. The statement by Jiménez came two days after two Spanish aid workers and one Italian were kidnapped by suspected al-Qaeda members in Tindouf, which is under the control of Polisario Front, which seeks the independence of Western Sahara from Morocco.

=== Arab League ===
Efforts to gain support in the Arab World for the idea of a Greater Morocco did not receive much support despite efforts in the early 1960s to enlist the Arab League for its cause. Morocco's expansionist ambitions caused strains, including a temporary rupture of relations with Tunisia. The Moroccans have been more successful regarding the Western Sahara. Unlike the Organization of African Unity which has strongly backed Western Sahara's right to self-determination, the Arab League has shown little interest in the area.

=== Moroccan claims ===
Morocco has argued that the Polisario Front receives support from Hezbollah, Iran, and al-Qaida. There is no third-party substantiation of these claims.

=== Palestine ===
In 1979, PFLP Secretary-General George Habash visited Sahrawi refugee camps and also met with Brahim Ghali assuring PFLP's support to Western Sahara's cause. Other Palestinian factions have taken different stances; for example Hamas has maintained close ties with the Moroccan Justice and Development Party (JDP) and has also banned activities of a Palestinian committee of solidarity with the Sahrawi people in Gaza since 2016.

=== France ===
France has supported the Moroccan position in the conflict.

=== Saudi Arabia ===
Saudi Arabia has been one of the main backers of Morocco against the SADR.

=== African consulates ===
In March 2020 Liberia opened a consulate for Morocco in the city of Dakhla, becoming the 10th African country to establish a diplomatic mission to Morocco in Western Sahara effectively recognizing the Moroccan mission in the region. The opening of the consulate was condemned by international representatives of both the Polisario Front and Algeria.

=== European Union ===
Members of European Parliament passed the Sustainable Fisheries Partnership Agreement (SFPA) in February 2019 which established an agreement for European Fishing vessels to fish in Moroccan territory and laid out plans for a transition towards a sustainable fishing model. Although the Polisario Front was not involved in the negotiations, the SFPA explicitly allows for European Vessels to fish in the disputed coast of the Western Sahara territory. The NGO Human Rights Watch penned a letter to European Members of Parliament seeking a vote against the proposition, arguing that Morocco has no legal basis to make agreements regarding a disputed territory and is thus illegal under international law. While the text of the agreement claimed that the fisheries will have no impact on the ongoing conflict, the agreement was denounced by various Saharawi groups. After the passing of the agreement a petition signed by leading Saharawi activist organizations in the region was penned to the EU condemning the decision, and the Polisario Front announced it will challenge the vote in the European Court of Justice stating it was in clear violation of international law. This move galvanized Morocco who then passed a law in January 2020 extending its recognized borders across Western Saharan waters.

=== United States ===
The United States have generally been supportive of Morocco's position.

The Obama administration disassociated itself from the Moroccan autonomy plan in 2009, however, reversing the Bush-backed support of the Moroccan plan, and returning to a pre-Bush position, wherein the option of an independent Western Sahara is on the table again.

In April 2013, the United States proposed that MINURSO monitor human rights (as all the other UN mission since 1991) in Western Sahara, a move that Morocco strongly opposed, cancelling the annual African Lion military exercises with U.S. Army troops. Also in mid-April, United States Ambassador to Morocco Samuel L. Kaplan declared during a conference in Casablanca that the Moroccan autonomy plan "can't be the only basis in these negotiations", referring to the UN sponsored talks between the Polisario Front and Morocco.

On 10 December 2020, President Donald Trump announced that the United States would officially recognize Morocco's claims over Western Sahara, in exchange for Morocco agreeing to normalize relations with Israel.

On 4 December 2020, the United States has recognized Moroccan sovereignty over the entire Western Sahara territory and has reaffirmed its support for Morocco's autonomy proposal as the only basis for a just and lasting solution to the dispute over the Western Sahara territory. The United States has stated that it believes that an independent Sahrawi State is not a realistic option for resolving the conflict and that genuine autonomy under Moroccan sovereignty is the only feasible solution.

== Peace process ==
=== Ceasefire ===
The ceasefire ending hostilities was officially signed in 1991. Further attempts have since been made to resolve the conflict, but no lasting resolution has been achieved to date. The ceasefire was upheld until 13 November 2020 when the Moroccan army entered into the demilitarized town of Guerguerat, and the Saharawi authorities responded by declaring that the ceasefire was broken and the SPLA armed forces attacked Moroccan army positions along the Moroccan Western Sahara Wall.

=== Referendum and Houston agreement ===
The referendum, originally scheduled for 1992, was intended to give the local population of Western Sahara the option between independence or affirming integration with Morocco, but it quickly stalled. In 1997, the Houston Agreement attempted to revive the proposal for a referendum, but likewise has not met with success. As of 2010, negotiations over the terms of any potential referendum have not resulted in any substantive action. At the heart of the dispute lies the question of who qualifies as a potential voter; the Polisario has insisted on only allowing those found on the 1974 Spanish Census lists (see below) to vote, while Morocco has insisted that the census was flawed by evasion and sought the inclusion of members of Sahrawi tribes which escape from Spanish invasion to the north of Morocco by the 19th century. Consequently, both sides blame each other for the stalling of the referendum, and little progress is likely to be made in the near future.

Efforts by the UN special envoys to find common ground between both parties did not succeed. By 1999 the UN had identified about 85,000 voters, with nearly half of them in the Moroccan-controlled parts of Western Sahara or Southern Morocco, and the others scattered between the Tindouf refugee camps, Mauritania and other locations throughout the world. The Polisario Front accepted this voter list, as it had done with the previous list presented by the UN (both of them originally based on the Spanish census of 1974), but Morocco refused. As rejected voter candidates began a mass-appeals procedure, the Moroccan government insisted that each application be scrutinized individually. Continuing disputes between the two factions once more brought the process to a halt.

According to a NATO delegation MINURSO election observers stated in 1999 that "if the number of voters does not rise significantly the odds were slightly on the SADR side". By 2001, the process had reached a stalemate, and the UN Secretary-General asked the parties for the first time to explore other solutions. Indeed, shortly after the Houston Agreement (1997), Morocco officially declared that it was "no longer necessary" to include an option of independence on the ballot, offering instead autonomy. Erik Jensen, who played an administrative role in MINURSO, wrote that neither side would agree to a voter registration in which they believed they were destined to lose.

=== Baker plan ===
The Baker Plan (formally, Peace Plan for Self-Determination of the People of Western Sahara) was a United Nations initiative led by James Baker to grant self-determination to Western Sahara, and was formulated in the year 2000. It was intended to replace the Settlement Plan of 1991 and the Houston Agreement of 1997, which had effectively failed to make any lasting improvement. Since early 2005, the UN Secretary-General has not referred to the plan in his reports, and by now it seems largely dead. No replacement plan exists, however, and worries persist that the political vacuum will result in renewed fighting. Morocco continues to propose autonomy for the territory as the solution to the conflict, while the Polisario Front insists on nothing other than complete independence.

=== Moroccan initiative and Manhasset negotiations ===
In 2006 the Moroccan Royal Advisory Council for Saharan Affairs (CORCAS) proposed a plan for the autonomy of Western Sahara and made visits to a number of countries to explain and gather support for their proposal. Citing the Spanish approach to regional autonomy, the Moroccan government plans to model any future agreement after the cases of the Canary Islands, Basque Country, Andalusia or Catalonia. The plan was presented to the UN Security Council in April 2007, and has received the backing of both the United States of America and France.

On 30 April 2007, the United Nations Security Council passed Resolution 1754, which both urged the involved parties to "enter into direct negotiations without preconditions and in good faith." and extended the MINURSO mission until 31 October 2007. As a result of the passage of this resolution, the parties involved met in Manhasset, New York to once again try and settle the dispute. The talks between the Moroccan government and the Polisario Front were considered the first direct negotiations in seven years between the two parties, and hailed as a landmark in the peace process. Also present at the negotiations were the neighboring countries of Algeria and Mauritania, a nod to the role they play in the ongoing conflict. The first round of talks took place on 18–19 June 2007, during which both parties agreed to resume talks on 10–11 August. After another inconclusive round of talks, the parties finally, on 8–9 January 2008, agreed on "the need to move into a more intensive and substantive phase of negotiations". An additional round of talks was held from 18 to 19 March 2008, but once again no major agreement was reached. The negotiations were supervised by Peter van Walsum, UN Secretary General Ban Ki-moon's personal envoy for Western Sahara. To date, all negotiations have failed to resolve the dispute.

=== Resumption of peace talks ===
In 2018 the United Nations Security Council announced that peace talks regarding the Western Sahara territory would resume and delegates of the Polisario Front, Morocco, Algeria, and Mauritania would all be present.

In April 2020, the Polisario Front publicly condemned the state of the on-going peace talks stating that its inaction legitimized the encroachment of Morocco into the territory. The statement reiterated the Polisario Front's request that the UN organize a free referendum within Western Sahara on their self-governing status. Currently the position of United Nations envoy to Western Sahara is empty and the Security Council is actively seeking a replacement.

On 6 October 2021, United Nations Secretary‑General, António Guterres, announced the appointment of Staffan de Mistura as his Personal Envoy for Western Sahara. On 13 January 2022, De Mistura commenced a round of discussions starting with Morocco's Foreign Minister, Nasser Bourita. On 15 January 2022, de Mistura, met with Polisario's head of political organization, Khatri Addouh, in Shahid Al Hafed.

In October 2025, the United Nations Security Council referenced Morocco's Autonomy Proposal as a basis for negotiations "with a view to achieving a just, lasting and mutually acceptable resolution to the dispute, consistent with the UN Charter" and welcomed "any constructive suggestions by the parties in response to the Autonomy Proposal". The resolution recognised that "genuine autonomy could represent a most feasible outcome" and encouraged the parties to submit ideas to support "a final mutually acceptable solution".

== Current situation ==
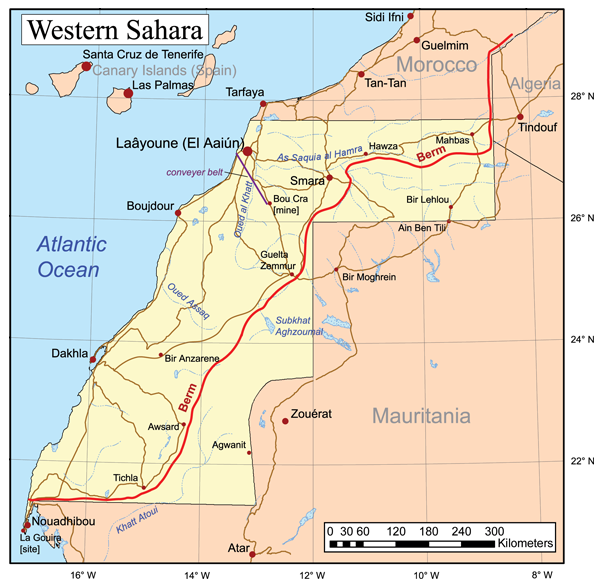
Map of Western Sahara

=== Polisario-controlled areas ===
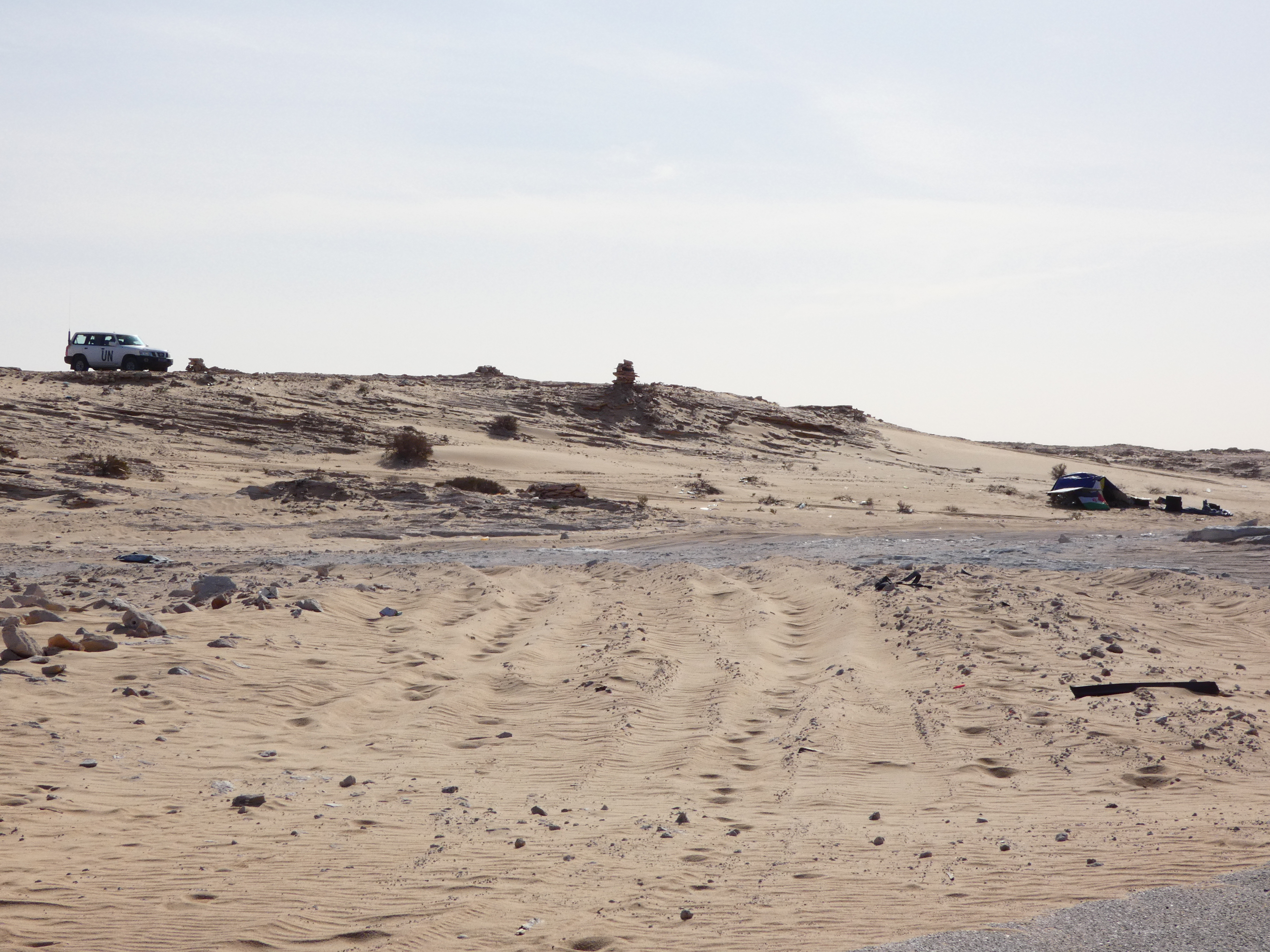
Left a car of MINURSO, right a post of the Frente polisario in 2017 in southern Western Sahara

The Polisario controls about 30% of the Western Sahara territory, as the Sahrawi Arab Democratic Republic (SADR), and claim sovereignty over the entire territory of Western Sahara. SADR was proclaimed by the Polisario Front on 27 February 1976, in Bir Lehlu, Western Sahara. Polisario calls the territories under its control the Liberated Territories or the Free Zone, while Morocco controls and administers the rest of the disputed territory and calls these lands its Southern Provinces. The SADR government considers the Moroccan-held territory to be occupied territory, while Morocco views the much smaller SADR-held territory as a buffer zone.

In addition, the Polisario Front has a full autonomous control of the Sahrawi refugee camps. The refugee camps were set up in the Tindouf Province, Algeria in 1975–76 for the benefit of Sahrawi refugees fleeing from Moroccan forces during the Western Sahara War. With most refugees still living in the camps, the refugee situation is among the most protracted worldwide. Most affairs and camp life organization is run by the refugees themselves, with little outside interference. Women have been "responsible for much of the administration of the camps."

=== Moroccan Wall ===
The Western Sahara Berm, also known as the Moroccan Wall, is an approximately 2,700 km-long defensive structure consisting primarily of sand running through Western Sahara and the southeastern portion of Morocco. It acts as a separation barrier between the Moroccan-controlled areas and the Polisario-controlled section of the territory (the SADR). According to maps from MINURSO or the UNHCR, part of the wall extends several kilometers into internationally recognized Mauritanian territory. According to Pascal Bongard, program director at Geneva Call, between five and ten million land mines have been laid in the areas around the wall.

As early as 1979, the idea of a defensive wall has been an obvious one for the Moroccan authorities. Constructed in six stages, from 1980 to 1987, five 'breaches' along the wall allow Moroccan troops the right of pursuit. The Polisario call the Berm the "wall of shame" while Morocco calls it a "defensive wall", "wall of sand" or "security wall".

=== Human rights ===
The Western Sahara conflict has resulted in severe human rights abuses, most notably the aerial bombardments with napalm and white phosphorus of the Sahrawi refugee camps, the exodus of tens of thousands of Sahrawi civilians from the country, and the forced expropriation and expulsion of tens of thousands of Moroccan expatriate civilians by the Algerian government in reaction to the Green March. The conflict has witnessed numerous violations of human rights and serious breaches of the Geneva convention on the part of all involved parties; the Polisario Front, the Moroccan government and the Algerian government among them.

=== Media censorship ===
Several international human rights organizations have accused the Moroccan government of imposing a media blackout in the region by targeting protestors and journalists. A report by French non-profit Reporters Without Borders (RSF) which tracks the suppression of journalism around the world reported on a systematic targeting of journalists within Western Sahara and argued that the blocking of foreign media access to the region has made it difficult to receive accurate and consistent reporting from inside the disputed territory.

In 2019 Amnesty International called for an investigation into a violent crackdown on protestors that took place on 19 July, in the city of Laayoune. The protests began as celebrations for Algeria's win in the 2019 Africa Cup of Nations, and eventually escalated into demonstrations for Sahrawi self-determination and clashes with Moroccan security forces. Footage from the clashes shows security forces using rocks, tear gas and live ammunition to disperse protestors. The clashes led to the arrest of dozens of protestors and one death.

Human Rights Watch has also been critical of the treatment of journalists during this conflict. In 2019 they accused the government of using Article 381 of Morocco's penal code to restrict freedom of the press. Article 381 restricts citizens from claiming a profession without meeting the necessary qualifications. Human Rights Watch called on the Moroccan government to amend the article to ensure it did not apply to journalists. On 4 December 2018 Moroccan forces arrested Nezha El Khalidi under Article 381 for live-streaming a Sahrawi protest and subsequently failing to meet the qualifications of a journalist. Spanish news agency Europa Press later criticized Moroccan authorities for expelling international observers from the public trail.

in June 2019, a video of Moroccan authorities violently dragging and beating prominent Sahrawi journalist Walid Al-Batal circulated across the internet. The video inspired condemnation from international rights groups who called for an investigation to be made and for Al-Batal to be released. Moroccan authorities rebutted the condemnation saying Al-Batal had crashed into a police car and resisted arrest, however these claims were disputed in an investigation on the incident published by The Washington Post. Al-Batal was sentenced to six years in prison.

The Polisario Front has also been accused of suppressing media freedoms within its territories. In July 2019 the Polisario Front arrested three Saharawi activists within the refugee camps for criticizing the Polisario Front's governance in Facebook Posts. Human Rights Watch called for the release of the political prisoners reporting that they had been held in harsh conditions and tortured to sign confessions, a direct violation of international law.

In the 2020 World Press Freedom Rankings reported on the treatment of journalists and independent media outlets in Morocco and Western Sahara rating it 133rd out of 180 countries. The country received a low score of 42.88 out of 100 citing the continued "judicial harassment" of the media.

== See also ==
- List of modern conflicts in North Africa
- Mohammed VI of Morocco
