= Sahrawis for Peace Movement =

Sahrawi political movement

Sahrawis for Peace Movement Movimiento Saharauis por la Paz
- Abbreviation: MSP
- Founded: April 2020

Sahrawis for Peace Movement (MSP) is a Sahrawi political movement founded in April 2020 by former members of the Polisario Front. It emerged as an alternative initiative within Sahrawi political debate on possible approaches to resolving the Western Sahara conflict.

== History ==
The movement was formally established on 22 April 2020 following a founding congress held online. Its creation involved former leaders and members of the Polisario Front who had expressed disagreements with the organization’s political strategy and internal functioning, at a time when the United Nations–led political process was widely viewed as stalled.

The MSP has been criticized by the Polisario Front and other pro-independence Sahrawi groups, which have questioned its representativeness and accused its leadership of holding positions close to those of Morocco.

Spanish media have also reported that Spain’s National Intelligence Centre (CNI) has linked the movement to Moroccan interests, citing alleged connections with that country’s intelligence services. The movement has rejected these allegations and has denied any organizational relationship with the Moroccan government or its intelligence services.

== Leadership ==
The MSP is led by Hach Ahmed Bericalla, a former representative of the Polisario Front in Spain and a former diplomatic official of the organization. After leaving the Polisario Front, Bericalla promoted the creation of the movement and was appointed secretary-general during its founding congress.

== Positions ==
The movement advocates a negotiated political solution to the Western Sahara conflict and rejects the use of violence as a means of achieving political objectives. It has emphasized dialogue, reconciliation among Sahrawis, and the need to improve the social and economic conditions of populations affected by the conflict.
