= 2011 Western Saharan protests =

2011 protests in Western Sahara

- Part of the Arab Spring and Western Sahara conflict
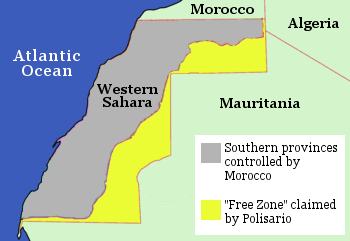
- Locator map of the Western Sahara with zones of de facto control
- Date: 25 February 2011 – May 2011 (2 months, 3 weeks and 1 day)
- Location: Western Sahara, with some incidents in southern Morocco
- Caused by: Discrimination, lack of self-determination, police brutality
- Methods: Civil disobedience, civil resistance, demonstrations, hunger strikes, protest camps, sit-ins, rioting
- Result: No visible changes

Parties
(Sahrawi Arab Democratic Republic) Sahrawi activists	Government of Morocco: General Directorate for National Security

Casualties and losses
- 1 killed, hundreds injured

The 2011 Western Saharan protests began on 25 February 2011 as a reaction to the failure of police to prevent anti-Sahrawi looting in the city of Dakhla, Western Sahara, and blossomed into protests across the territory. They were related to the Gdeim Izik protest camp in Western Sahara established the previous fall, which had resulted in violence between Sahrawi activists and Moroccan security forces and supporters. The protests also purportedly drew inspiration from the Arab Spring and successful revolts in Tunisia and Egypt, although the Arab Spring proper did not reach Western Sahara.

No significant protests were reported beyond May 2011, though international media coverage of Western Sahara is incomplete at best. There is renewed calls for peaceful protests from the Polisario Front.

== Background ==
The Gdeim Izik protest camp was a protest camp in Western Sahara established on 9 October 2010 and lasting into November, with related incidents occurring in the aftermath of its dismantlement on 8 November. While protests were initially peaceful, they were later marked by clashes between civilians and security forces.

== Timeline ==
=== Dakhla riots ===
On 25 February 2011, clashes were reported in Dakhla, the second largest city of Western Sahara. The unrest started late that night after the "Sea & Desert" Dakhla music festival concerts when, according to Sahrawi sources, "hundreds of Moroccan youths armed with sticks, swords, and Molotov cocktails attacked and looted Sahrawi houses, burning their cars".

The next day, hundreds of protesters gathered on the city center, protesting against police inaction on the previous night. They attacked government buildings, banks and shops using stones and gas cylinders, without police intervention. The music festival was then suspended. On the night, riots started again without police presence. On Friday, police were deployed in the streets to prevent new protests.

According to Mayor Hamid Shabar, "Separatist elements tried to take advantage of a quarrel that occurred among some youths late last Friday night/early Saturday morning in order to disrupt the peaceful atmosphere that this area enjoys." Official Moroccan press agency (MAP) reported that two civilians were intentionally run over by a four-wheel drive vehicle driven by protesters, and that 14 people were injured.

According to a Radio France International reporter, at least 100 people were injured, but many were afraid to go to the hospital for treatment.

=== Laayoune sit-ins ===
On 2 March, a group of about 500 people, comprising old workers of Bu Craa, fishermen, vocational education student graduates, members of the dialogue committee of the Gdeim Izik camp and families of political prisoners, made a sit-in in front of the Mining and Energy Ministry in Laayoune; they asked for the release of all prisoners of conscience. The Moroccan security forces intervened then and dispersed the demonstration.

According to the Polisario, between 13 and 68 people were injured during the intervention of the Police, including three people carrying Spanish citizenship.

On 8 April, families of "political prisoners" held a new protest in the Moroccan-administered city in a bid to draw attention to the alleged poor treatment of Sahrawi detainees and call upon Moroccan authorities for their release, a Sahrawi human rights group said. The group also claimed that though police and intelligence officers kept a close watch on the vigil, protesters were nonviolent and no clashes erupted. Similar to major days of demonstration in other Arab states experiencing concurrent protests, the vigil was held on a Friday, though it was unclear if this was intentional on the part of protest organizers.

Later in the month, peaceful protests in Laayoune became tri-weekly events, taking place on Mondays, Wednesdays, and Fridays, accompanying an "indefinite" sit-in held by unemployed university graduates outside of the Moroccan Ministry of Labour building in the city that started 20 April, according to several Sahrawi interest groups who spoke to media in mid-May. These groups also claimed other protests were being held in solidarity with Laayoune's activists in several more cities and towns in Western Sahara. However, these reports have not been independently verified.

=== May activism ===
A sit-in at the family home of a Sahrawi boy allegedly killed by Moroccan police was dispersed on 19 May, with 30 protesters left injured by security officers, pro-Sahrawi media reported. A handful of activists in Smara also started a sit-in and hunger strike to protest the suspension of their wages for visiting Polisario-administered refugee camps in the Algerian Sahara.

Protests were also reportedly held in Guelmim and Assa in southern Morocco proper to protest the death and arrest of several Sahrawi youth activists in late April, though Sahrawi sources claiming knowledge of these events did not specify when they took place and their reports could not be immediately verified by independent media or observers.

== Connection to regional events ==
Media reported in February 2011 that Sahrawis were closely watching the Arab Spring, the popularly dubbed wave of pro-democracy, anti-government protests throughout North Africa and the Middle East that started in December 2010, and celebrated the downfall of Egyptian President Hosni Mubarak in a popular revolution. Some Sahrawis called for organization in protest camps to replicate the events of the Egyptian uprising, though opinion was reportedly divided on whether they believed they could join forces with a protest movement in Morocco proper. According to afrol News, the initial protest in Dakhla appeared to be an isolated reaction to the alleged violence of the night before, though more organized demonstrations had apparently spread to El Aaiun and possibly throughout the territory by March and April.

While Foreign Policy reported in April that the Arab Spring seemed to have not had much effect in Western Sahara, with the international community not reacting strongly to the 2010 Sahrawi protests and the Moroccan security clampdown in early 2011, Polisario Front official and president of the partially recognized Sahrawi Arab Democratic Republic Mohamed Abdelaziz said in early April, "Like our brothers and sisters in Tunisia, Egypt, Libya and Bahrain, the Saharawi people just want a vote to freely decide their own future. It worked in South Sudan. It will work in Western Sahara too."

== See also ==
- List of protests in the 21st century
