= Western Sahara autonomy proposal =

Political initiative in Morocco

The Western Sahara autonomy proposal is an initiative proposed by Morocco since 2007 to establish a Sahara Autonomous Region as a possible solution to the Western Sahara conflict. In 2006, the Moroccan Royal Advisory Council for Saharan Affairs (CORCAS) proposed a plan for the autonomy of Western Sahara and made visits to a number of countries to explain the proposal. The Spanish approach to regional autonomy has been named as a possible model for Western Saharan autonomy, mentioning specifically the cases of the Canary Islands, the Basque Country, Andalusia, and Catalonia. The plan was presented to the UN Security Council in April 2007 and received the backing of the United States and France. This initiative constituted the main ground for the Moroccan proposal at the Manhasset negotiations.

The proposal was following the two failed proposals of the Baker Plan, which insisted on an independence referendum for Western Sahara after five years of autonomy; the plan was rejected by Morocco. A proposal was also published by Polisario to the UN on 10 April 2007, a day before the Moroccan proposal. The UN Security Council unanimously voted for Resolution 1754 on 30 April 2007 calling for talks of both parties, appreciating the proposal of Morocco and taking note of Polisario's proposal. Based on the proposal, there were four UN-sponsored peace talks between delegations of Polisario and Morocco on 18–19 June 2007, 10–11 August 2007, 7–9 January 2008, and 18–19 March 2008, all of which were held in Manhasset, New York, though they ended without a breakthrough.

After years of diplomatic inaction, a new international effort emerged in 2024. A UN envoy has proposed dividing the disputed territory between Morocco and the Pro-Independent Western Sahara, though the Polisario said the plan fails to "enshrine" the Sahrawi people's right for self-determination.

In October 2025, the United Nations Security Council adopted Resolution 2797 supporting Morocco's autonomy plan, describing genuine autonomy under Moroccan sovereignty as potentially the most feasible solution to the conflict. The resolution urged the parties to resume negotiations on that basis.

== History ==
Western Sahara was a Spanish colony until 1975. A war erupted between those countries and the Sahrawi national liberation movement, the Polisario Front, which proclaimed the Sahrawi Arab Democratic Republic (SADR) with a government in exile in Tindouf, Algeria. Mauritania withdrew in 1979, and Morocco eventually secured control of most of the territory, including all the major cities and natural resources. Polisario was formed in 1973 to fight for the rights of the Sahrawi people. Polisario attacked Moroccan positions many times and have retaliated. Continued war was waged between Polisario and Morocco over prominence in the region, with Polisario being backed by Algeria and Morocco being backed by the United States, France, and Saudi Arabia.

=== Interim wars ===
Morocco started building a massive wall to reduce the attacks and military activity. During November to December 1987, a United Nations peace mission arrived to assess the military and political impact of the wall. They sought a face-to-face meeting with Polisario and Morocco to arrive at a ceasefire and initiate proceedings for a referendum. They had different meetings with Morocco, Algeria and Polisario and proposed a resolution which was passed unopposed. During the time, Algeria, which had been a long-time ally of Polisario, held secret meetings with Morocco at the foreign ministry level. By May 1988, both countries announced that diplomatic relations between the countries would be restored. During July 1988, Moroccan King Hassan expressed his support for a referendum, but declined to name Western Sahara an independent state, but a special administrative region. He also denied meeting with Polisario. In spite of the UN's continued effort, the denial introduced criticism of Morocco's positions by Polisario. King Hassan agreed to meet representatives from SADR. During 1989, Algeria claimed that it would continue to support SADR amidst growing concern of Algeria breaking links with SADR. King Hassan's elongated delay frustrated SADR and they started an attack. During the first week of October 1989, Polisario started attacks on Moroccan positions in Guelta-Zemmour, which forced Moroccan troops 25 kilometers inside the defensive wall. The group also claimed that they secured the 1st Light Security Group of the 4th and 5th Rapid Intervention Force of Morocco. They also attacked Moroccan positions in the North towards Hauza on October 11. Following the attacks King Hassan called off the second meeting with SADR representatives.

=== Baker Plan ===
The fighting continued until 1 September 1991 when a UN mission brokered peace a ceasefire in the region. There have been various proposals by both the parties in the United Nations. James Baker, an American diplomat in the region worked out a couple of settlement plans, called Baker Plan after 1997. In the first plan, he proposed autonomy to the region with foreign affairs and defense managed by Morocco. The plan was rejected by Polisario, indicating that any proposal without independence could not be accepted. They also argued that the count of natives should be based on the census of 1975 and not based on migrants from Morocco in the interim period. The second proposal called for a referendum after five years of autonomy. The plan was accepted by Morocco initially, but later rejected quoting that any plan with proposal of independence could not be accepted. The plan was rejected by Morocco and Baker left the position in 2004.

== Proposal ==
Moroccan-backed advisory council on Western Sahara (CORCAS) submitted a proposal to the United Nations in April 2006 that would grant autonomy to the people of Western Sahara. As per the plan, the Sahrawis would run their government under Moroccan sovereignty. It also indicated that Morocco will control defense and foreign affairs.

The Moroccan authorities indicated that the failure of the proposal would increase Islamic fundamental ideas and terrorism in the region around the Sahel. Hamid Chabar, the Moroccan representative of the United Nations Mission for the Referendum in Western Sahara quoted that "There are a lot of young people in the Sahel who are leaning towards radical Islam, with groups such as the Salafist Group for Preaching and Combat gaining ground". The claims were denied by Polisario which stated that it never supported terrorism.

The autonomy proposal was rejected by the front in February 2004 soon as it was proposed, while Morocco sought the backing of the United States to take it forward. A proposal was also published by Polisario to the UN on 10 April 2007, a day before the Moroccan proposal. The UN Security Council unanimously voted for Resolution 1754 on 30 April 2007, calling for talks of both parties, appreciating the proposal of Morocco and taking note of Polisario's proposal. Based on the proposal, there were four UN-sponsored peace talks between the delegation of Polisario and Morocco 18–19 June 2007, 10–11 August 2007, 7–9 January 2008, and 7–9 January 2008, all of which were held in New York City.

In a 2007 letter to President George W. Bush, 173 members of the US Congress endorsed the plan. In a letter to President Obama in 2009, 233 US congressmen endorsed the plan. In 2010, a letter to Secretary of State Clinton backing the Moroccan plan for autonomy, was signed by 54 Senators.

On 19 March 2022, the Spanish and Moroccan press suggested the president of the Spanish Government had provisionally accepted this proposal, although parliamentary ratification was not assured.

In October 2025, the United Nations Security Council referenced Morocco's autonomy proposal as a basis for negotiations "with a view to achieving a just, lasting and mutually acceptable resolution to the dispute, consistent with the UN Charter" and welcomed "any constructive suggestions by the parties in response to the Autonomy Proposal". The resolution recognised that "genuine autonomy could represent a most feasible outcome" and encouraged the parties to submit ideas to support "a final mutually acceptable solution".

== Proposed Sahara Autonomous Region ==
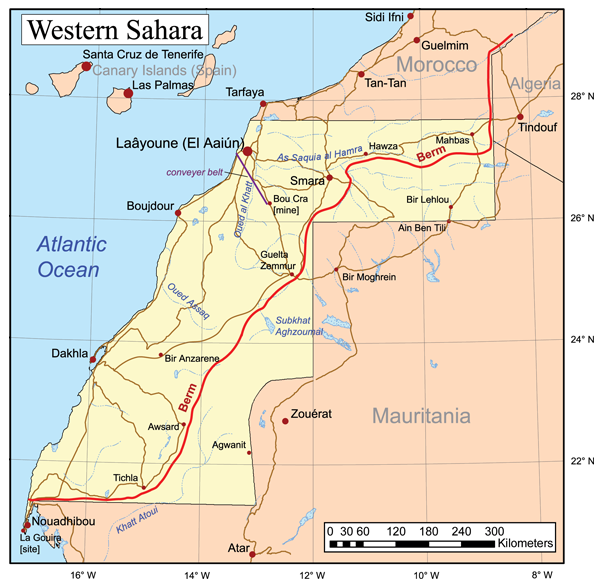
Map of Western Sahara, which would encompass the proposed Sahara Autonomous Region

Morocco has proposed autonomy for Western Sahara through the establishment of a Sahara Autonomous Region.

The "Moroccan Initiative for Negotiating an Autonomy Statute for the Sahara Region" defines the division of powers between the Government of Morocco and the Sahara Autonomous Region and contains provisions to establish legislative and executive organs for the region.

=== Competencies ===
The Government of Morocco would retain the following competencies

- national security, defence and territorial integrity;
- foreign relations;
- the judiciary;
- religious rights and freedoms;
- currency;
- national symbols including the flag and national anthem.

The Sahara Autonomous Region would have competency over

- the local police force and jurisdictions;
- the regional budget and taxation;
- economic policy including economic development, regional planning, investment, trade, industry, tourism and agriculture;
- social policy including housing, education, health, employment, sports, social welfare and social security;
- infrastructure including water, hydraulic facilities, electricity, public works and transportation;
- cultural affairs;
- the environment
- cooperation with foreign regional governments.

=== Institutions ===
The Parliament of the Sahara Autonomous Region would include directly elected members and appointed members representing Saharawi tribes.

The Regional Cabinet would be led by the Head of Government of the Sahara Autonomous Region, appointed by the King of Morocco on the advice of the regional Parliament.

== International reaction ==
=== Support ===
Rank	Country	Date	Remarks	Ref.
1	United States	2020-12-10	On 10 December 2020, US President Donald Trump proclaimed that the United States recognized Moroccan sovereignty over Western Sahara.	
2	Spain	2022-03-18	"Spain considers the Moroccan autonomy initiative presented in 2007, as the most serious, realistic, and credible basis for resolving the dispute." Sanchez further described the extensive Moroccan efforts to work within the UN's framework to find a peaceful solution to the decades-old conflict.	
3	France	2022-03-22	France has reiterated its support to the Moroccan autonomy plan as a "serious and credible basis for discussions" for the resolution of the dispute over the Moroccan Sahara.	
4	Guatemala	2022-09-23	"Guatemala reiterated its clear position on the regional dispute over the Moroccan Sahara, considering that autonomy under Moroccan sovereignty is the solution to this dispute and announces the decision to open a consulate in the city of Dakhla to take advantage of its economic potential and its openness to the rest of the African continent", said Guatemalan Foreign Minister Mario Bucaro Flores.	
5	Somalia	2022-09-23	Foreign Minister Mahmoud Abdi Hassan's call for cooperation follows years of Somali continuous support for Morocco's sovereignty over Western Sahara which was translated on multiple occasions into concrete actions such as opening a consulate in Dakhla.	
6	Israel	2023-07-17	In July 2023, Israel officially recognized Moroccan sovereignty over Western Sahara.	
7	Kenya	2025-05-26	In a joint statement issued after talks between the two countries' foreign ministers in Rabat, Kenya said it views the Moroccan plan as the only credible and realistic solution and the sole sustainable approach.	
8	United Kingdom	2025-06-01	In June 2025, UK Foreign Secretary David Lammy stated that Morocco's plan for autonomy in Western Sahara represented "the most credible, viable and pragmatic" solution to the conflict.	
9	Ghana	2025-06-06	In June 2025, Ghanaian foreign minister Samuel Okudzeto Ablakwa stated that the autonomy plan is "the only realistic and sustainable basis for a mutually agreed solution".	
10	Portugal	2025-07-23	Portugal announced in July 2025 their support for the proposal, with Foreign Minister Paulo Rangel saying that the plan has a "serious and credible basis" to ensure regional prosperity.	
11	Belgium	2025-10-23	Autonomy under Moroccan sovereignty "is the most adequate, serious, credible and realistic basis to reach a political solution" to the Western Sahara issue, Belgium said in the joint declaration signed in Brussels by Moroccan foreign minister Nasser Bourita and Belgian foreign minister and deputy prime minister Maxime Prévot.	
12	Netherlands	2025-12-05	The Netherlands affirms that genuine autonomy under Moroccan sovereignty is the most feasible solution. The Netherlands fully supports the efforts of the Secretary-General and his Personal Envoy to facilitate and conduct negotiations based on the autonomy plan proposed by Morocco in order to achieve a just, lasting, and mutually acceptable settlement.	
13	Sweden	2026-01-19	Sweden expresses support for Morocco's autonomy plan, in light of the recently adopted Security Council Resolution 2797, as a credible basis for negotiations to reach a mutually accepted, sustainable and just political solution in accordance with the UN Charter and which respects the right of the Sahrawi people to self-determination.	
_	European Union	2026-01-29	The European side restated the EU's commitment to the resolution of the dispute in Western Sahara and welcomed the adoption of UN Security Council Resolution 2797 (2025), which expresses full support for the Secretary-General and his Personal Envoy in facilitating and conducting negotiations, taking as a basis Morocco's autonomy proposal, with a view to achieving a just, lasting and mutually acceptable resolution of the dispute, consistent with the United Nations Charter, and welcomes any constructive suggestion by the parties in response to the autonomy proposal, and which calls upon the parties to engage in discussions without preconditions, taking as a basis Morocco's autonomy proposal, with a view to achieving a final and mutually acceptable political solution that provides for the self-determination of the people of Western Sahara, recognises that genuine autonomy could represent a most feasible outcome and encourages the parties to submit ideas to support a final mutually acceptable solution. In this context, the EU welcomed Morocco's willingness to engage in good faith with all parties concerned in order to clarify the arrangements under this autonomy plan and explain what shape autonomy under Moroccan sovereignty would take.	
14	Switzerland	2026-04-24	On the question of the Western Sahara, Mr Cassis reiterated Switzerland's support for the key role of the UN in achieving a just, lasting and mutually acceptable political solution. In this regard, Switzerland welcomes the adoption of Security Council Resolution 2797, which affirms that genuine autonomy under Moroccan sovereignty could be one of the most feasible solutions, and reiterates the importance of respecting the right to self-determination.	
15	Canada	2026-04-28	Acknowledging the importance of the issue of Western Sahara to Morocco, Minister Anand noted the adoption of UN Security Council resolution 2797 on 31 October 2025. She affirmed Canada's recognition of Morocco's autonomy plan for Western Sahara as basis for a mutually acceptable solution and as a serious and credible initiative in achieving a just and lasting settlement of the conflict. In this context, the Minister emphasized the need to reach a lasting, just and mutually acceptable political settlement in accordance with the principles of the UN Charter and relevant Security Council resolutions.	
16	Germany	2026-04-30	Germany reaffirmed support for the UN-led negotiation process regarding Western Sahara, and that it views Morocco's autonomy proposal as a serious and credible basis for negotiations, expressing readiness to assist the UN Secretary-General's Personal Envoy in clarifying how autonomy under Moroccan sovereignty would function.	
17	Japan	2026-05-08	Regarding Western Sahara, Japan welcomed the adoption of United Nations Security Council Resolution 2797, on 31 October 2025, which endorsed Morocco's autonomy proposal as basis for a just, lasting, and mutually acceptable solution to the dispute and affirmed that genuine autonomy under Moroccan sovereignty could constitute a most feasible solution. Japan expressed its support for the Secretary-General of the United Nations and his Personal Envoy in facilitating and conducting negotiations taking as basis Morocco's autonomy proposal with a view to achieving a just, lasting, and mutually acceptable resolution to the dispute. Japan called upon the parties to engage in these discussions without preconditions, taking as basis Morocco's autonomy Proposal, with a view to achieving a final and mutually acceptable political solution, and recognized that genuine autonomy could represent a most feasible outcome. On this occasion, Minister Motegi reiterated that Japan stands ready to act taking into account its position and the current progress of the situation, including at the diplomatic and economic levels.	
18	Colombia	2026-08-10	Colombia derecognized the Sahrawi Republic and recognized Moroccan sovereignty over Western Sahara, stating that the decision "fully respects international law, the United Nations Charter, and the framework proposed by Security Council Resolution 2797 (2025) on Western Sahara."	
19	Chile	2026-09-21	During a bilateral meeting between the foreign ministers of both countries in New York City on the sidelines of the 81st UN General Assembly, Chile recognized Moroccan sovereignty over Western Sahara and declared that the autonomy proposal is a "just, lasting, and mutually acceptable political solution".	
20	Panama	2026-09-21	Panama recognized Morocco's sovereignty over Western Sahara and supports the autonomy proposal.	
21	Mali	2026-09-23	Malian Foreign Minister Abdoulaye Diop (diplomat) reiterated his country's recognition of Western Sahara and its support for the autonomy proposal at the UN General Assembly meeting in New York City.	
22	Mauritius	2026-09-24	Foreign Affairs Minister Dhananjay Ramful described the autonomy plan as "the most credible solution."	
22	Peru	2026-09-24	Peru recognized Moroccan sovereignty over Western Sahara, supported the autonomy proposal as "a just, lasting and acceptable political solution for all parties" and announced it would open a consulate in Dakhla.	
23	Senegal	2026-10-03	Senegalese Foreign Minister welcomed the growing support for the autonomy plan.	
24	Burkina Faso	2026-10-03	Burkina Faso Foreign Minister Karamoko Jean-Marie Traoréreaffirmed his support for Morocco's autonomy plan.	
25	United Arab Emirates	2026-10-03	United Arab Emirates Minister of State Khalifa bin Shaheen Al Marar reiterated his support for Morocco's autonomy plan.	
