= Manhasset negotiations =

2007–2008 talks between Morocco and the Sahrawi Polisario Front

The Manhasset negotiations (also known as Manhasset I, II, III and IV) were a series of talks that took place in four rounds in 2007–2008 in Manhasset, New York, between the Moroccan government and the representatives of the Sahrawi liberation movement, the Polisario Front, to resolve the Western Sahara conflict. They were considered the first direct negotiations in seven years between the two parties. Also present at the negotiations were the neighboring countries of Algeria and Mauritania.

The negotiations were a result of the United Nations Security Council Resolution 1754 of April 30, 2007 which urged both parties to "enter into direct negotiations without preconditions and in good faith". The resolution also stipulated the United Nations Mission for the Referendum in Western Sahara (MINURSO) mission extension until October 31, 2007.

The first round of talks took place on June 18–19, 2007 during which both parties agreed to resume talks on August 10–11. The second round ended with no breakthroughs, but parties agreed again to meet for another round. During the last round which took place between January 8 and 9, 2008, parties agreed on "the need to move into a more intensive and substantive phase of negotiations". A fourth round of talks was held from 18 March to 19 March 2008. The negotiations were being supervised by Peter van Walsum, UN secretary general Ban Ki-moon's personal envoy for Western Sahara.

== Background ==
The Manhasset rounds can be considered as the third attempt to reach a peaceful solution for the Western Sahara conflict. In 1991, a cease-fire agreement was concluded, which planned for a self-determination referendum (between integration to Morocco and independence as the SADR) in 1992. Because of disagreements over who should be allowed to vote, the referendum was repeatedly postponed. Morocco had brought large numbers of illegal settlers into the territory to outweigh the indigenous vote. Polisario insisted on the 1991 agreement's use of a Spanish census, taken immediately before the Moroccan occupation in 1975, as the basis of voter registration. Morocco, for its part, argued that these people were in fact Sahrawis, and that no vote could take place without them.

In 1997, after US-backed mediation, Morocco and the Polisario Front went through what is known as the Houston Agreement which restarted the referendum process. The UN's MINURSO mission, tasked with keeping the peace and organizing the vote on independence, concluded its pre-referendum voter registration in 1999, with a preliminary list of approximately 85,000 voters. Morocco protested the exclusion of large numbers of people it had claimed were of Western Saharan descent, who had been refused voting rights after interviews by MINURSO on-site inspection teams, and subsequently refused to accept the survey. When the kingdom launched some 130,000 individual appeals, UN officials admitted that the process had again entered a deadlock.

Starting in 2000, there were new attempts to salvage the peace process, like the Baker Plan (Plans I and II); again with forceful US backing. These documents both involved full voting rights for all persons resident in the territory, including those Polisario had referred to as "settlers", irrespective of what MINURSO's voter identification commission had arrived at. The first Baker plan was circulated as a draft, and energetically supported by Morocco, but after Polisario voiced equally strong opposition, it was discarded by the Security Council. In contrast, the latter, more detailed version was sponsored by a UN Security Council resolution (SCR 1495) in the summer of 2003, and thereafter cautiously accepted by Polisario, allegedly after strong Algerian pressure. However, it was categorically refused by Morocco on the grounds that it included independence as a ballot option; after the arrival of Mohammed VI of Morocco to the throne, in 1999, Morocco had reneged on its 1991 and 1997 agreements on a vote on independence. Polisario argued that Morocco had thus broken a main condition of the 1991 cease-fire agreement, which had wholly hinged on the independence referendum, but despite this, it did not resume fighting.

Another deadlock ensued, during which Morocco made it known that it was readying a proposal for autonomy under Moroccan sovereignty. Polisario agreed to enter autonomy as a third option on the referendum ballot, but refused to discuss any referendum that did not allow for the possibility of independence, arguing that such a referendum could not constitute self-determination in the legal sense of the term.

== Delegations ==
=== Morocco ===
The only member of the Moroccan delegation absent at Manhasset II-IV was Fouad Ali El Himma, the former Delegate Minister to the Interior. The participants were:

- Chakib Benmoussa, Interior Minister and lead negotiator,
- Taieb Fassi Fihri, Foreign Minister,
- Khalihenna Ould Errachid, Chairman of CORCAS,
- Yassine Mansouri, head of Morocco's intelligence (DGED),
- Mohamed Saleh Tamek, then Wali (governor) of the Oued Ed-Dahab-Lagouira region and cousin of Ali Salem Tamek.
- CORCAS Secretary General Maoulainine Khallihenna.

Other top-level government officials from the Southern Provinces were also part of the delegation.

=== Polisario Front ===
- Mahfoud Ali Beiba, President of the Sahrawi National Council and Head of the Polisario delegation
- Bachir Radhi Segaiar, an adviser to Polisario leader Mohammed Abdelaziz
- Ahmed Boukhari, Polisario representative at the UN
- Brahim Ghali
- Mohamed Khadad
- Sidi M. Omar

=== Algeria ===
- Abdallah Baali, Ambassador, adviser at the Foreign Affairs Ministry
- Youcef Yousfi, Algerian Ambassador to the UN

=== Mauritania ===
- Sidi Mohamed Ould Boubacar, Ambassador to Spain
- Abderrahim Ould Hadrami, Ambassador to the UN
- Abdelhafid Hemmaz, adviser at the Foreign Ministry
