= Emmanuel Tawil =

French lawyer and academic

- Occupation: Professor of Law
- Known for: public service law, law and religious, Ecclesiastical law, public law.

Academic background
- Education: Aix-Marseille University; University of Fribourg; University of Strasbourg

Academic work
- Discipline: Law
- Sub-discipline: Public law Constitutional law Civil liberties

Emmanuel Tawil is a French lawyer and academic, associate professor at the University of Paris II Panthéon-Assas. As a lawyer, he defended the families of the victims during the trial of the Gdeim Izik protest camp.

== Training ==
He holds two doctorates, one in canon law in Strasbourg in 2003, one in public law in Aix-Marseille in 2006 and a degree in theology in Friborg in 2010. He did his post-doctorate at the EPHE (École Pratique des Hautes Études – School for Advanced Studies).

He is a lecturer in Paris II and qualified as a professor in February 2018. He teaches at the Catholic Institute of Lyon and the Catholic Institute of Paris where he directed the degree in law and political science. He has been a corresponding member of the Pontifical Committee for Historical Sciences since 2014 and a member of the Council for Canonical Questions of the Conference of Bishops of France since 2012.

He has participated in numerous symposiums especially in Rome and UC Berkeley.

== Professional activities ==
=== Lawyer ===
His legal activities led him to defend the families of the victims of the events of November 8, 2010 in Laayoune. On that occasion he asserted that Gdim Izik's trial "is not a political trial" and that he was perfectly in accordance with the rules of fair trial. He also criticizes the Court of Justice of the European Union (CJEU) for acting as a means of putting pressure on Morocco. He opposes the prohibition of the veil at university and wishes the Alsace-Moselle regime cult to be preserved

=== Academic ===
As an academic, he specializes in public law – in particular religious law and international relations – and has published several books on it. He is also interested in secularism, whose instrumentalization he deplores, and in the relations between The Holy See and other States. He makes the "positive secularism" mentioned by Benedict XVI one of the major contributions of his magisterium

He explains that the churches' right of asylum was restricted by Charlemagne before being abolished in 1539 by Francis I. If previously churches enjoyed genuine immunity from public powers, now the reference to "right of asylum" has disappeared from the code of Canon law, so it would be necessary to speak of reception in churches and not of asylum

In 2014, he was appointed member of the Consultative Commission of Religions by the Minister of Social Affairs and Health. He is appointed alongside Yves Gaudemet or Sébastien Fath, among the "personalities chosen for their competence and known for their work, their activities, their knowledge of the social protection problems of ministers of religions and members of religious congregations and religious communities of various faiths and of questions relating to the legal status of religions and problems of religious sociology". Regarding paedophilia cases, Emmanuel Tawil considers that the sexual abuse scandal in the Archdiocese of Boston marked a turning point and that today the Church cooperates with the civil authorities and is not in a logic of secrecy or Omertà.

== Publications ==
- Norme religieuse et droit français, PU Aix-Marseille, 2005, 322 p.
- Droit des cultes. Personnes, activités, biens et structures, Juris Associations, 2005, 640 p.
- Du gallicanisme administratif à la liberté religieuse, Presses Universitaires d'Aix-Marseille, 2009, 250 p.
- Laïcité de l'État & Liberté de l'Église, Artège Editions, 2013, 160 p.
- Justice et religion : La laïcité à l'épreuve des faits, Presses Universitaires de France, 2016, 248 p.
- France & Saint-Siège. Accords diplomatiques en vigueur, Cerf, 2017, 200 p.
- Cultes et congrégations, Dalloz, 2019, 464 p.

== Distinctions ==
Emmanuel Tawil is:

- Knight of the National Order of Merit (France)
- Commander of the Equestrian Order of the Holy Sepulchre of Jerusalem
- Knight of the Order of St. Sylvester
- Member of the Society of Men of Letters of France

The Academy of Moral and Political Sciences awarded him the Gallet Prize in 2016 for his book "Justice et religion". Secularism in the test of facts.
