= People's Voice (Scottish pro-independence group) =

Scottish political group

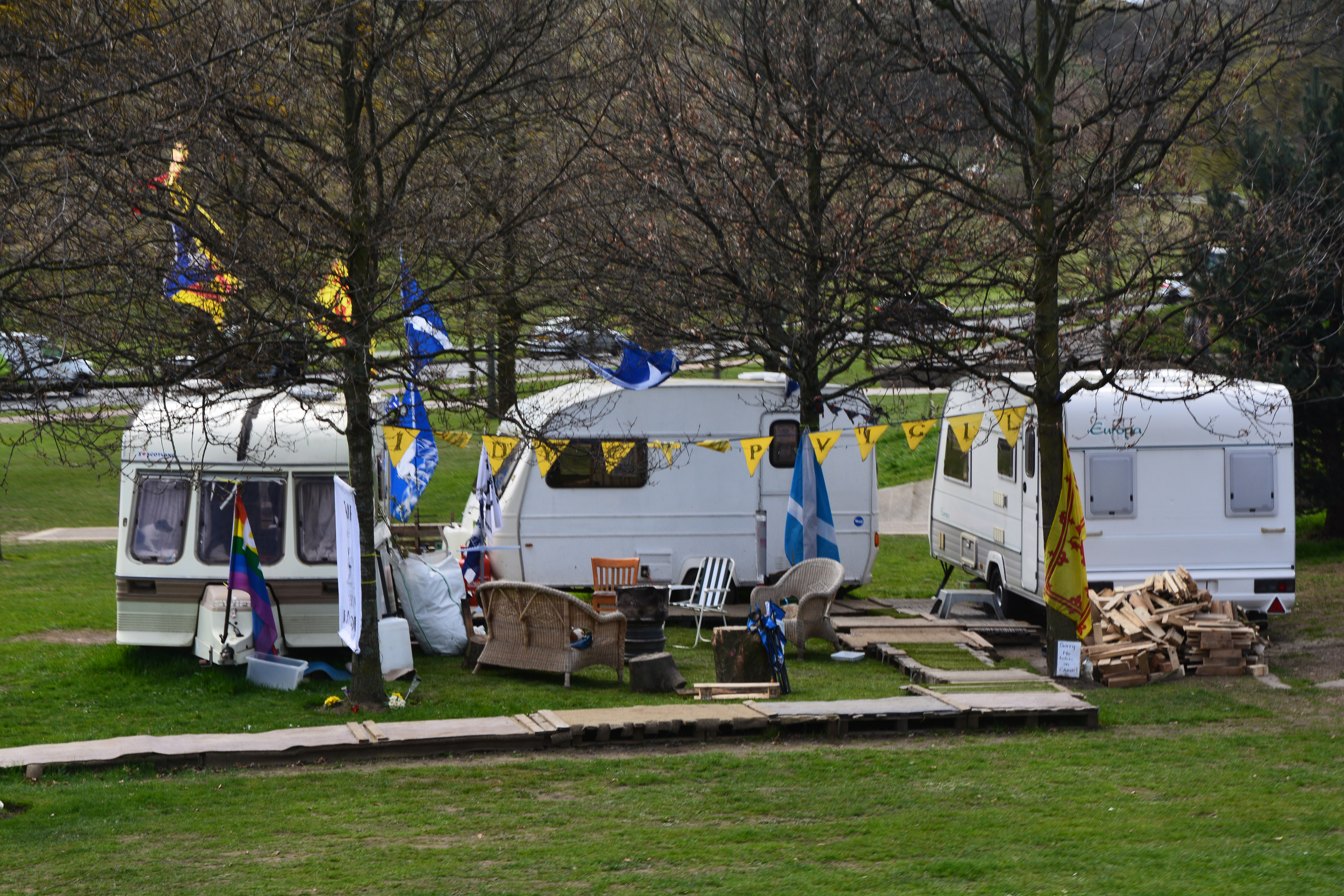
The Holyrood camp in April 2016

People's Voice is a Scottish pro-independence group. They organised the 2015 IndyCamp Live protest camp at Holyrood.

People's Voice called for a second referendum on Scottish independence and described their camp as a continuation of the Democracy for Scotland vigil.

The Scottish Parliament clerk and chief executive Paul Grice objected to the camp on the grounds that its presence at Holyrood infringes on the neutrality of parliament as well as preventing others from using the space, and was set up on the grounds without permission. In a letter to members of the Scottish parliamentary estate, Grice also said that legal advice was being sought on how to remove the camp. On 8 December 2015, Sheriff officers issued the campers with a notice ordering them to leave within 48 hours. The campers have stated that they will not leave. On 10 December, the Scottish parliament began legal action to evict the campers. In July 2016, Lord Turnbull ruled that the eviction of the campers would not breach their human rights.
