= Protest camp =

Physical encampment set up by activists

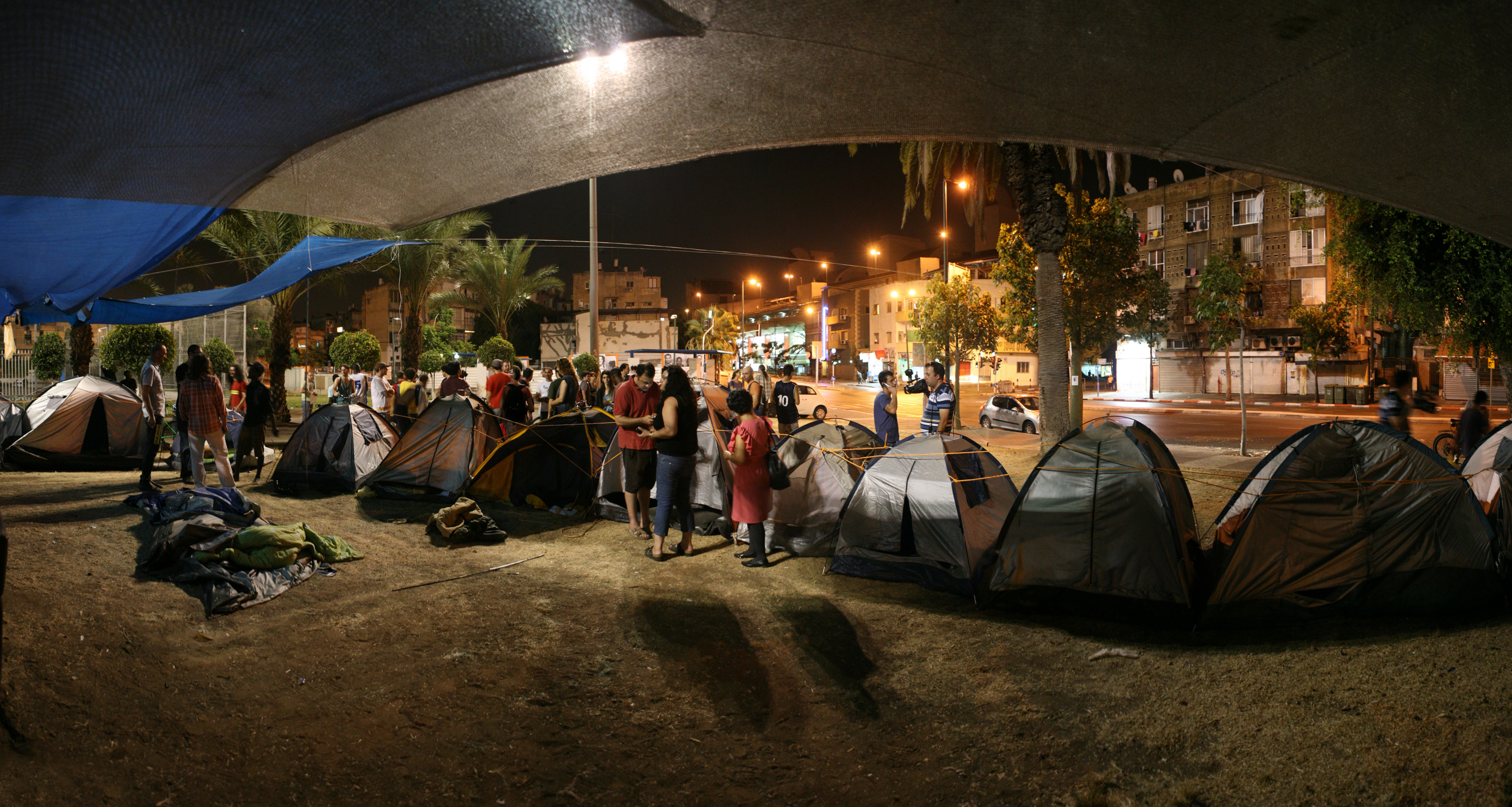
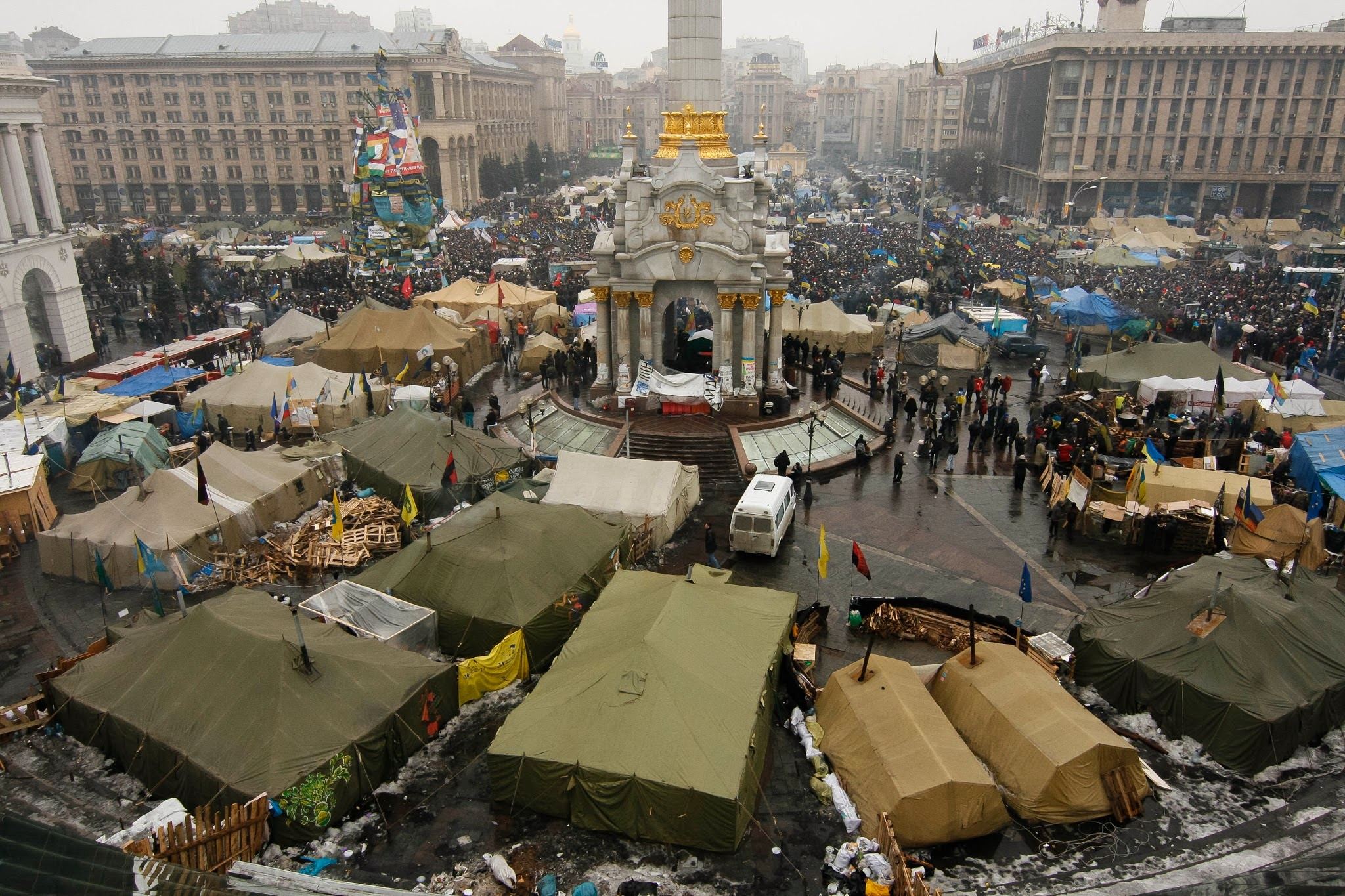
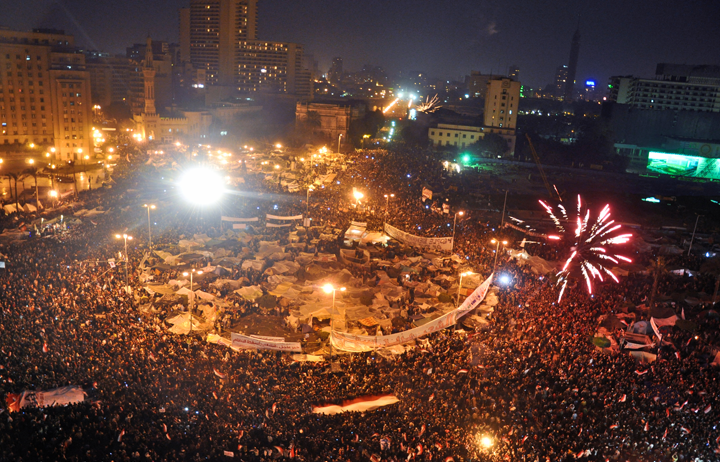
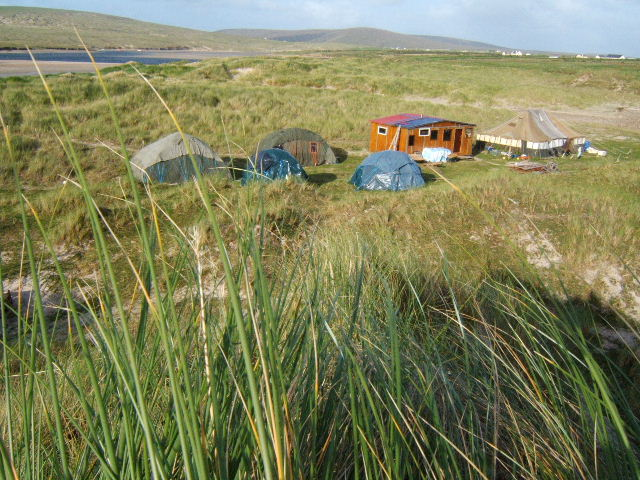
Clockwise from upper left: Protest encampment in southern Tel Aviv during the 2011 Israeli social justice protests, Independence Square during the Euromaidan protests on 9 February 2014, Rossport Solidarity Camp, and Tahrir Square during the 2011 Egyptian revolution on 11 February

A protest camp or protest encampment (or just encampment) is a physical camp that is set up by activists, to either provide a base for protest, or to delay, obstruct or prevent the focus of their protest by physically blocking it with the camp. A protest camp may also have a symbolic or reproductive component where 'protest campers' try and recreate their desired worlds through the enactment of protest camp infrastructures (such as communal kitchens, child care, environmentally friendly composting toilet or use of grey water systems) or through the modes of organising and governance (e.g. direct democracy).

Camping on and/or occupying land has a long history which can be traced back to nomadic cultures as well as the 17th century Diggers. However, the use of protest camps as a contemporary form of protest can be linked back to the US civil rights movement of the 1960s and, specifically, "Resurrection City", a protest camp held in May 1968 in Washington, D.C. as part of the Poor People's Campaign. In the United Kingdom publicity around the 1982 Greenham Common Women's Peace Camp in England put protest camps in the public imagination. Since then the practice of protest camping has and continues to be used by many social movements around the world.

== See also ==
- Camp for Climate Action
- People's Voice (Scottish pro-independence group)
- Gdeim Izik protest camp
- Occupation (protest)
- Occupy movement
- Peace camp
- Poor People's Campaign
- Rossport Solidarity Camp
