= Abu Nidal Organization internal executions =

Executions within the Abu Nidal Organization

- Part of Palestinian political violence
- Location: Syria; Lebanon; Libya
- Date: 1987–1988
- Deaths: ~150 to ~600
- Perpetrators: Abu Nidal; Mustafa Ibrahim Sanduqa; Isam Maraqa; Sulaiman Samrin; Mustafa Awad

The Abu Nidal Organization internal executions were the mass executions of members of the Abu Nidal Organization and their families by Abu Nidal and key associates during 1987–1988. The executions took place at a number of locations in Syria, Lebanon and Libya. The number of people executed – mostly Palestinians – is estimated between 150 and 600.

== Executions within the organization ==
According to ANO members who were able to escape, recruits were buried alive, fed through a tube forced into their mouths, then finally killed by a bullet fired down the tube. Some had their genitals placed in skillets of boiling-hot oil.—Duane 'Dewey' Clarridge

The Abu Nidal Organization (ANO)'s official newspaper Filastin al-Thawra regularly carried stories announcing the execution of traitors within the movement. Each new recruit of the ANO was given several days to write his entire life story by hand – including names and addresses of family members, friends, and lovers – and was then required to sign a paper agreeing to his execution if anything was found to be untrue. Every so often, the recruit would be asked to rewrite the whole story. Any discrepancies were taken as evidence that he was a spy and he would be made to write it out again, often after days of being beaten and nights spent forced to sleep standing up.

=== 1987 events ===
By 1987, Abu Nidal had turned the full force of his paranoia and terror tactics inwards on the ANO itself. Members were routinely tortured by the "Committee for Revolutionary Justice" until they confessed to betrayal and disloyalty. Men would be hanged naked for hours and whipped until they lost consciousness, then revived with salt or chili powder rubbed into their wounds. A naked prisoner would be forced into a car tire with his legs and backside in the air, then whipped, wounded, and salted. Plastic melted under a flame would be dripped onto prisoners' skin. According to recruits who were able to escape, prisoners' genitals would be placed in skillets of boiling-hot oil and fried while the men were held down. Between interrogations, prisoners would be confined alone in tiny cells, bound hand and foot. If the cells were full, a prisoner might be buried alive, with a steel pipe in his mouth to allow him to breathe. Water would be poured into it occasionally. When word came that Abu Nidal wanted the prisoner executed, a bullet would be fired down the tube instead, then the pipe removed and the hole filled in.

==== Perpetrators ====
In one year from 1987 to 1988, around 600 were killed, between a third and a half of the membership of the ANO. Abu Nidal had the elderly wife of a veteran member, Al-Hajj Abu Musa, thrown in jail and killed on a charge of lesbianism. The killings were mostly the work of four men: Mustafa Ibrahim Sanduqa of the Justice Committee; Isam Maraqa, Abu Nidal's deputy, who was married to his wife's niece; Sulaiman Samrin, also known as Dr. Ghassan al-Ali, the ANO's first secretary; and Mustafa Awad, also known as Alaa, the head of the Intelligence Directorate. Most of the decisions to kill, said Abu Dawud, a long-time member of the ANO, were taken by Abu Nidal "in the middle of the night, after he [had] knocked back a whole bottle of whiskey".
