= Peter van Walsum =

Dutch diplomat (1934–2019)

A. Peter van Walsum

Permanent representative of the Netherlands to the United Nations
- In office July 2005 – August 2008

Personal details
- Born: 25 June 1934 Rotterdam, Netherlands
- Died: 4 December 2019 (aged 85) The Hague, Netherlands

A. Peter van Walsum (25 June 1934 – 4 December 2019) was a Dutch diplomat. He served as the permanent representative of the Netherlands to the United Nations and the United Nations Secretary-General's Personal Envoy for Western Sahara. He was appointed to the position by United Nations Secretary-General Kofi Annan in July 2005 and left the position in September 2008 when his mandate expired.

Van Walsum was born in Rotterdam. He earned a degree in law from the University of Utrecht in 1959, going on to serve in the Dutch Military from 1960 to 1962 before joining the Civil Emergency Planning section of the Ministry of General Affairs from 1962 to 1963.

He went on to serve in the Dutch Ministry of Foreign Affairs for almost forty years. His overseas posts included the Permanent Mission to the North Atlantic Treaty Organization (NATO) in Paris, the embassies in Bucharest, New Delhi, London, Bangkok, Bonn, and the Permanent Mission to the European Commission in Brussels.

After joining his country's Permanent Mission to the United Nations in New York, he became the Dutch representative on the Security Council in 1999 and Chairman of the Iraq Sanctions Committee in 2000. After his retirement, he gave an extensive interview to Radio Netherlands about his career and his work at the Security Council.

Peter van Walsum died in The Hague on 4 December 2019. He was married with four children.
