= Baker Plan =

2000 UN-proposed solution to the Western Sahara conflict

The Baker Plan is a United Nations initiative to grant self-determination to Western Sahara initially proposed by UN special envoy James Baker in 2000. It was intended to replace the Settlement Plan of 1991, which was further detailed in the Houston Agreement of 1997.

== Background ==
Western Sahara's administration by Morocco since 1975 is challenged by Polisario guerillas living in exile in neighbouring Algeria. Since 1991, a ceasefire has been in place, accepted by both parties with the understanding that the UN would organize a referendum on independence. The 1991 referendum plan was stalled, however, due to disagreements on voter eligibility. Morocco demanded the inclusion of all people now living in the territory, including all Moroccan settlers. Following the 1975 Green March, the Moroccan state has sponsored settlement schemes enticing thousands of Moroccans to move into the Moroccan-occupied part of Western Sahara (80% of the territory). By 2015, it was estimated that Moroccan settlers made up at least two-thirds of the 500,000 inhabitants.

The Polisario Front insisted on inclusion of only found in the 1974 final Spanish census and their descendants; the 1974 census had been mentioned as the basis of voter lists in the 1991 agreement. Specialized Minurso identification teams eventually found in favor of some 80,000 voters deemed to be indigenous to the territory. That number corresponded quite closely to the Spanish census of 75,000 persons, which caused Morocco to launch appeals against the voter list on behalf of over 100,000 rejected applicants from the Moroccan side. This stalled the process, and by the late 1990s, Morocco had begun declaring the referendum a "dead option."

== Baker I ==
The first draft of the plan, called Baker I or the Framework Agreement on the Status of Western Sahara, was circulated by the UN special envoy James Baker in 2000, but never presented formally to the Security Council. Although based on Baker's proposals, it was drafted by a Morocco-sponsored legal team. It offered the people of Western Sahara autonomy within the Moroccan state. Except for defense and foreign policy, all other decisions would be the responsibility of local government. Morocco accepted the plan, but the Polisario rejected it.

== Baker II ==
The second version (the Peace Plan for Self-determination of the People of Western Sahara, informally known as Baker II) envisioned Saharan self-rule under a Western Sahara Authority for a period of five years, with a referendum on independence to follow. In this referendum, the entire present-day population of Western Sahara would participate, including people who had migrated from or been settled by Morocco post-1975, something which Polisario had so far refused. On the other hand, a provision that the interim local government (the Western Sahara Authority) would be elected only by a restricted voters' list (those identified as original inhabitants of the territory by MINURSO) alienated Morocco.

After Morocco had voiced early objections to Baker II, the Polisario front reluctantly accepted the plan as a basis for negotiations. In July 2003, the UN Security Council endorsed the plan, something that it had not done with Baker's first draft, and unanimously called for the parties to implement it. Morocco, however, then rejected the plan, saying that it would no longer agree to any referendum that included independence as an option.

== Status of the Baker Plan ==
After not being able to seek agreement on the Baker II plan, James Baker resigned in protest, the second UN envoy to Western Sahara to do so. He indicated that given the irreconcilable positions of the parties and the Security Council's refusal to enforcing a solution over the objections of either party, there no longer appeared to be a feasible way to implement the 1991 Settlement Plan or to reach another compromise solution. While the Polisario, anxious to have a strong mediator with US backing in charge of the UN process, deplored his resignation, Moroccan officials viewed it in a positive light; foreign minister Benaissa publicly called the resignation a result of "the tenacity of Moroccan diplomacy".

Since early 2005, the UN Secretary General has not referred to the plan in his reports, and by now it seems largely shelved. No replacement plan exists, however worries persist that the political vacuum will result in renewed fighting. Morocco proposed its own autonomy proposal in 2007 as a possible solution to the Western Sahara conflict.

== See also ==
- Western Sahara Autonomy Proposal
