= Houston Agreement =

1997 UN-brokered agreement on Western Sahara

The Houston Agreement was the result of negotiations between the Polisario Front and Morocco on the organization of a referendum, which would constitute an expression of self-determination for the people of Western Sahara, possibly leading to full independence or integration within Morocco. The talks were conducted during 1997 in Houston, United States, under the auspices of United Nations representative James Baker, using the framework of the 1991 Settlement Plan. The agreement was supposed to lead to a referendum in 1998, after it had been prevented from taking place in 1992 as originally envisioned.

The Baker Accord was signed at Baker Institute of Public Policy at Rice University under the aegis of United Nations Security Council between 14th and 16 September 1997. in Houston and came to be known as Houston Accord. Both the parties signed the final document listing out all agreements, and was documented as UN doc. S/1997/742 par 4-13. It was the first time in the peace process that any agreement was signed between the rival parties. Morocco wanted to augment the voter list based on the census taken during the Spanish time of 1970s, while Polisario rejected the proposal, leading to the prevention of referendum of the accord.

== Background ==
The portions of Western Sahara was a Spanish Colony until 1975. It was the last colonial province in Africa. A war erupted between the combined forces of Morocco and Mauritania against the Sahrawi national liberation movement, the Polisario Front, which proclaimed the Sahrawi Arab Democratic Republic (SADR) with a government in exile in Tindouf, Algeria. Mauritania withdrew in 1979, and Morocco eventually secured control of most of the territory, including all the major cities and natural resources. Polisario was formed in 1973 to defend the rights of the Sahrawis. Polisario attacked Moroccan positions many times and have retaliated. Continued war was waged between Polisario and Morocco over prominence in the region backed by Algeria for Polisario and US, France and Saudi Arabia for Morocco.

In spite of UN's continued effort, there were mutual attacks between Morocco and Polisario. During 1989, Algeria claimed that it would continue to support SADR amidst growing concern of Algeria breaking links with SADR. King Hassan's elongated delay frustrated SADR and they started an attack.

== Baker Plan ==
The fighting continued till 1 September 1991 when a UN mission brokered peace a ceasefire in the region. There have been various proposals by both the parties in the United Nations. James A. Baker, a diplomat in the region worked out a couple of settlement plans, called Baker Plan after 1997. In the first plan, he proposed autonomy to the region with foreign affairs and defense managed by Morocco. The plan was rejected by Polisario and Algeria indicating that any proposal without independence could not be accepted. They also argued that the count of natives should be based on the census of 1975 and not based on migrants from Morocco in the interim period. The second proposal called for a referendum after five years of autonomy. The plan was accepted by Morocco initially and it was to be sealed in Houston.

== The Accord ==
Baker convened the first direct talks between Morocco and Polisario in Lisbon on 23 June 1997. The one voter identification plan suggested by Baker was agreed by both parties in the second round of talks in London. The parties also agreed to make provisions of troop withdrawal. The third round of talks in Lisbon on 29 and 30 August brought out issues of political prisoners, and code of conduct of referendum. The final round of talks, which was held at Baker Institute of Public Policy at Rice University in Houston between 14th and 16 September 1997 and came to be known as Houston Accord. Both the parties signed the final document listing out all agreements, and was documented as UN doc. S/1997/742 par 4-13. It was the first time in the peace process that any agreement was signed between the rival parties. Both the parties, published a timetable of action items, with the major one being voter identification. Morocco wanted to augment the voter list based on the census taken during the Spanish time of 1970s, while Polisario rejected the proposal, leading to the prevention of referendum of the accord. The plan was rejected by Morocco later and Baker left the position in 2004.
