= Gdeim Izik protest camp =

Protest camp in Western Sahara

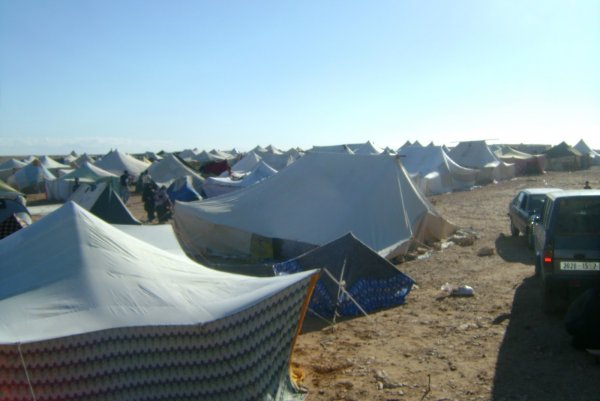
- The Gdeim Izik protest camp in late October 2010.
- Date: 9 October – 8 November 2010
- Location: El Aaiún, Western Sahara
- Caused by: Discrimination of local citizens, Poverty, Human rights abuses
- Methods: Demonstrations, protest camp, rioting

Parties
(Western Sahara) Sahrawi protestors	Government of Morocco: General Directorate for National Security

Casualties and losses
3 Sahrawi civilians dead (Moroccan claim) 36 Sahrawi civilians dead (Polisario claim) 1200 Sahrawi protestors injured	11 Moroccan police officers dead (Moroccan claim) 173 Moroccan officials injured

The Gdeim Izik protest camp (also spelled Gdayam Izik) was a protest camp in Western Sahara, established on 9 October 2010 and lasting into November that year, with related incidents occurring in the aftermath of its dismantlement on 8 November. The primary focus of the protests was against "ongoing discrimination, poverty and human rights abuses against local citizens".

While protests were initially peaceful, they were later marked by clashes between Sahrawi civilians and Moroccan security forces. Some referred to the protests as the Third Sahrawi Intifada, following the First and the Second Sahrawi Intifadas.

Political activist Noam Chomsky has suggested that the month-long protest encampment at Gdeim Izik constituted the start of the Arab Spring, while most sources consider the self-immolation of Mohamed Bouazizi in Tunisia on 17 December 2010 to be the actual start.

== Events ==
The protest started on the night of 9 October 2010, when a group of Sahrawis erected the protest camp 12 km. south-east of El Aaiún, the administrative capital of the Moroccan-administered Southern Provinces in the disputed territory. The number of protesters increased rapidly in the first weeks from a few hundred khaimas (traditional tents) to several thousand coming from other towns of Western Sahara and southern Morocco.

By the first week of November, the Gdeim Izik protest camp's population was estimated at around 5,000. The primary objective of the camp was to protest against "ongoing discrimination, poverty and human rights abuses against local citizens", but later some protesters also demanded independence for Western Sahara.

On 24 October, a vehicle trying to enter the camp was fired upon by Moroccan Army forces. As a result, 14-year-old Nayem Elgarhi died and other passengers were injured. According to the Moroccan Interior ministry, a bullet was fired from the vehicle forcing the security forces to return fire, with a final toll of one dead and three injured. However, according to the Polisario front, there were no weapons in the vehicle. According to SADR's Occupied Territories and Communities Abroad Ministry, while the youths were bringing food, water and medicines to the protest camp, they were chased by the security forces since they fled El Aaiún. Elgarhi's family denounced the boy's secret burial, demanding a trial for the officers who shot him.

=== Dismantlement ===
On the early morning of 8 November, the protest camp was dismantled by Moroccan police forces, with 3,000 arrests. According to the Moroccan Interior Ministry, no firearms were used and the civilians on the camp were deployed "as human shields". Confronting them was a group of young protesters that used stones, knives and propane tanks.

== Further riots ==
The riots later expanded to El Aaiun and other towns like Smara and El Marsa. In El Aaiun, protesters took to the streets in the morning, as there were no communications with the protest camp and they had no information about their relatives and friends in the camp. The protesters, some waving SADR's flag, were joined by the residents of the camp who were reaching the city in attacking government buildings, banks, cars and shops, and clashing with the police forces. In the afternoon, with the return of the forces deployed in Gdeim Izik, pro-Moroccan protesters demonstrated in the city.

== International reactions ==
=== International organizations ===
- African Union: The president of the African Union Commission, Jean Ping, expressed on a statement issued on 10 November, expressing his great concern about the events of El Aaiún, and the results of the Moroccan use of force against the hitherto peaceful Sahrawi camp, saying, "Forcible measures taken by Moroccan authorities to dismantle the camp and disband the protesters have regrettably resulted in the loss of lives and the destruction of property". Finally, the African Union called upon Morocco's government to refrain from the use of force, and follow the path of discussion as the only productive means to resolve the crisis.
- European Union: On 25 November, the European Parliament approved a resolution about the events in Western Sahara. The text expressed great concern about the deterioration of the situation on the territory, and strongly condemned the violent incidents in Gdeim Izik and El Aaiún, calling the parties to remain calm and deploring the loss of lives. The resolution also called the UN to make an independent international inquiry to clarify the events, while regretting the attacks on the freedom of press by the Moroccan authorities and insisting on the implementation of a human rights monitoring mechanism by the UN.
- United Nations: On 17 November, the United Nations Security Council condemned the violence during the dismantlement of the camp. On October 2, 2023, the UN calls in a note to release Sahrawi independence demonstrators, members of the so-called Gdeim Izik group, who had been found guilty of the murder of members of the Moroccan security forces during the dismantling of the camp. Gdeim Izik by Moroccan courts in 2013, and imprisoned since.

=== Countries ===
- Algeria: The president of the National Consultive Commission for the Promotion and Protection of Human Rights, Farouk Ksentini, qualified the attack on Gdeim Izik by the Moroccan forces as "a genocide and a crime against humanity committed by an aggressive country", and asked the international community to force Morocco to "recognize its crimes".
- Colombia: The Human Rights Commission of the Chamber of Representatives of Colombia condemned "the violence exercised by the Moroccan forces against the Sahrawi civilian population, women, child and the elderly people.", expressing their solidarity with the Sahrawi victims, exhorting the Government of Colombia to reject the attacks on a helpless people and asking Morocco to stop aggressions and to respect the right on self-determination of the Sahrawi people. Finally, the commission reminded the violation of the Right of Information, and criticized the "fearlessness" of the international community on the violation of human rights.
- Cuba: The Cuban National Assembly of People's Power condemned the attack by Moroccan military forces against the Sahrawi protest camp, considering it a treacherous crime committed against peaceful protesters, who were demanding the end of the occupation of the Sahrawi territory and the Moroccan domination. The Cuban parliament rejected the Moroccan aggression and demanded the United Nations Security Council exercise its influence to stop the actions.
- El Salvador: During a meeting at the chancellery with Hash Ahmed, the Latin America minister of the SADR, the Salvadoran Foreign Affairs minister, Hugo Martínez, expressed his solidarity with the victims of the events in El Aaiún, reaffirming that El Salvador supported the dialogue process and negotiation between the parts.
- France: French Foreign Affairs minister, Bernard Kouchner, qualified on 9 November the events on Western Sahara as "very serious" and as an "emergency problem". He also regretted the expulsion from Morocco of French communist deputy Jean-Paul Lecoq, who was trying to reach El Aaiún. "It is not permissible that an elected representative of the nation had been expelled from the territory of a friendly country" he added.
- Ireland: Irish Foreign Affairs minister, Micheál Martin, expressed on 9 November deep concern about reports concerning the Sahrawi protest camp. The minister pointed that "it was notable that the demands of those who established the protest camp centered on equal rights and treatment for the Saharawi people, rather than the issues of sovereignty or the status of the territory". He regretted the deaths, violence and the excessive reaction of the Moroccan security forces to what had been a peaceful protest on the part of Saharawi activists. Finally, he called both sides to act responsibly and avoid deterioration of the situation.
- Italy: On 9 November, Italian Foreign Affairs minister, Franco Frattini, said that "we are extremely concerned about the death and injuries of several individuals during the clashes". He also expressed "sympathy and closeness" to the families of the victims, called the parts to continue with the negotiations at the UN, and to maintain calm and moderation to avoid confrontations that would cause more civilian casualties and bloodshed.
- Mexico: The Senate of Mexico expressed its "profound sorrow and energetic indignation" for the events in which some Sahrawi citizens lost their lives, and expressed condolences to their families, exhorting the government to expose clearly their posture about the issue. "The Senate of the Republic condemns the events occurred in the Gdeim Izik camp of El Aaiún, and exhorts the Foreign Relations Secretary to encourage the implementation of tools to investigate and act accordingly for what happened in that camp, to preserve International humanitarian law and peace in W. Sahara".
- Nicaragua: The Government of Nicaragua regretted the violent events on the Sahrawi camp of El Aaiún, and condemned the "illegal and disproportionate use of force by military units of the Kingdom of Morocco". The Foreign Affairs ministry finally stated "We regret and condemn these events, while reiterating our solidarity and appreciation for the brotherly people and government of the Sahrawi Arab Democratic Republic".
- Panama: The Foreign Relations ministry of Panama expressed their grave concerns about the regrettable acts of violence and confrontation in W. Sahara and transmitted profound condolences to the irreparable loss of valuable human lives, several people injured and numerous damages caused by the clashes between Moroccan security forces and Sahrawi civilians. It also called the parts to respect human rights, avoid escalation of violence and propitiate an ambient dialogue.
- South Africa: The Government of South Africa said they have "learnt with shock about the heavy-handed manner in which the Moroccan security forces broke up a protest at a camp in El Aaiún in the occupied territory of the Western Sahara on November 8, 2010" according to a 12 November, statement by the Department of International Relations & Cooperation. The South African government urged the parties to hasten these talks so that a solution to the Western Sahara conflict could be found, based on and in conformity with, the provisions of the United Nations Charter and the Constitutive Act of the African Union, especially the principle of the sanctity of colonial borders in Africa and the right of the peoples of former colonial territories to self-determination. On 20 November, during the presentation of credentials of Joseph Kotane as ambassador of South Africa to the Sahrawi republic, he expressed the strong support of the South African government and people with the Sahrawi government and people, strongly condemning the atrocities committed by Morocco. The diplomatic finally stated that "Western Sahara is the last colony in Africa subjected to colonialism and all African countries have moral and legal responsibility to support the government and people of Western Sahara to achieve their independence and freedom from this colonial oppression".

== Aftermath ==
According to Moroccan authorities, the dismantlement of the Gdeim Izik camp and the posterior protests resulted in 11 deaths and 159 wounded among the security forces and 2 civilian deaths among protesters (one of them, Babi Hamadi Buyema, who was carrying Spanish citizenship, was reported dead after being repeatedly run-over by a police car).

According to the Polisario Front, 36 Sahrawis were killed, 723 wounded, and 163 were arrested.

=== Governmental changes ===
On 26 November, Mohammed VI made several changes of walis (civil governors), including Mohamed Jelmouss. The former wali of El Aaiún was appointed governor of the Doukkala-Abda region, but was dismissed from that post soon after. He was replaced by Khalid Dkhil, member of the CORCAS and son of a mayor of Dakhla during Spanish colonization era, marking the first time that a Sahrawi was appointed governor of the Laayoune-Bojador region.

=== Smara youth clashes ===
On 29 November, clashes between Moroccan and Sahrawi students at the Moulay Rachid high school resulted in at least 29 injured, according to SADR's Ministry of Occupied Territories and Communities Abroad, while sources in the town affirm that 36 had been treated at the Smara regional hospital.

=== Trials ===
A group of mainly young Sahrawis were arrested after the protests and were accused of the murder of the 11 Moroccan auxiliary Forces killed before the dismantlement of the camp. They were tried in a military court and 25 of them received heavy jail sentences. Some reported being tortured by the Moroccan DST.

List of the Gdeim Izik trial prisoners:

1. Enaâma Asfari: Sentenced on 17 February 2013 to 30 years
2. Ahmed Sbaï: sentenced on 17 February 2013 to life imprisonment
3. Cheikh Banga: sentenced on 17 February 2013 to 30 years
4. Khadda El Bachir: sentenced on 17 February 2013 to 20 years
5. Mohamed Tahlil: sentenced on 17 February 2013 to 20 years
6. Hassan Dah: sentenced on 17 February 2013 to 30 years
7. Mohamed Lamine Haddi: sentenced on 17 February 2013 to 25 years
8. Abdallah Lakhfaouni: sentenced on 17 February 2013 to life imprisonment
9. Abdallah Toubali: sentenced on 17 February 2013 to 25 years
10. Elhoucine Ezzaoui: sentenced on 17 February 2013 to 25 years
11. Deich Eddaf: sentenced on 17 February 2013 to 25 years
12. Abderrahmane Zayou: Freed on 17 February 2013
13. Mohamed Bourial: sentenced on 17 February 2013 to 30 years
14. Abdeljalil Laâroussi: sentenced on 17 February 2013 to life in prison.
15. Mohamed Elbachir Boutinguiza: sentenced on 17 February 2013 to life in prison.
16. Taki Elmachdoufi: Freed on 17 February 2013)
17. Mohamed El Ayoubi: Freed on 17 February 2013)
18. Sidi Abdallah Abman: sentenced on 17 February 2013 to life in prison
19. Brahim Ismaïli: sentenced on 17 February 2013 to life in prison
20. Mohamed Mbarek Lefkir: sentenced on 17 February 2013 to 25 years
21. Babait Mohamed Khouna: sentenced on 17 February 2013 to 25 years
22. Sid Ahmed Lamjayed: sentenced on 17 February 2013 to life in prison
23. Mohamed Bani: sentenced on 17 February 2013 to life in prison
24. El Bakai Laarabi: sentenced on 17 February 2013 to 25 years
25. Mbarek Daoudi: Arrested on 28 September 2013; waiting military trial in Rabat.

== Legacy ==
Poets Hadjatu Aliat Swelm and Hossein Moulud have written about life at the protest camp.

== See also ==
- Western Sahara
- La Badil (No Other Choice)
- Emmanuel Tawil
