= List of United Nations resolutions concerning Western Sahara =

United Nations documents related to decolonization of Spanish Sahara, the Western Sahara conflict, Moroccan military occupation, Sahrawi refugees, and the establishment of MINURSO.

== Security Council Resolutions ==
No.	Title	Date	Vote	Concerns
377	The situation concerning Western Sahara: letter dated 18 October 1975 from the Permanent Representative of Spain to the United Nations addressed to the President of the Security Council (S/11851)	22 October 1975	Adopted by consensus	Decolonization of Spanish Sahara and efforts toward a peaceful resolution
1108		1997	Unanimous	MINURSO mandate in Western Sahara
1238		14 May 1999	Unanimous	Extension of MINURSO mandate until 14 September 1999
1292		2000	Unanimous	MINURSO mandate in Western Sahara
1301		2000	Unanimous	MINURSO mandate in Western Sahara
1308		2000	Unanimous	MINURSO mandate in Western Sahara
1309		2000	Unanimous	MINURSO mandate in Western Sahara
1324		30 October 2000	Unanimous	Extension of MINURSO mandate until 28 February 2001
1463		30 January 2003	Unanimous	Extension of MINURSO mandate until 30 January 2003
1495		31 July 2003	Unanimous	Extension of MINURSO mandate until 31 October 2003
1541		29 April 2004	Unanimous	Extension of MINURSO mandate until 31 October 2004.
1598		28 April 2005	Unanimous	Extension of MINURSO mandate until 31 October 2005.
1634		28 October 2005	Unanimous	Extension of MINURSO mandate until 30 April 2006
1675		28 April 2006	Unanimous	Extension of MINURSO mandate until 31 October 2006.
1720		31 October 2006	Unanimous	Extension of MINURSO mandate until 30 April 2007
1754		30 April 2007	Unanimous	Extension of MINURSO mandate until 31 October 2007
1783		31 October 2007	Unanimous	Extension of MINURSO mandate until 30 April 2008
1813		30 April 2008	Unanimous	Extension of MINURSO mandate until 30 April 2009
1871		30 April 2009	Unanimous	Extension of MINURSO mandate until 30 April 2010
1920		30 April 2010	Unanimous	Extension of MINURSO mandate until 30 April 2011
1979		27 April 2011	Unanimous	Extension of MINURSO mandate until 30 April 2012.
2044		24 April 2012	Unanimous	Extension of MINURSO mandate until 24 April 2013.
2099		25 April 2013	Unanimous	Extension of MINURSO mandate until 30 April 2014
2152		29 April 2014	Unanimous	Extension of MINURSO mandate until 30 April 2015
2218		28 April 2015	Unanimous	Extension of MINURSO mandate until 30 April 2016
2285		29 April 2016	10-2-3 (against: Uruguay and Venezuela; Russia and 2 others abstained)	Extension of MINURSO mandate until 30 April 2017
2531		28 April 2017	Unanimous	Extension of MINURSO mandate until 30 April 2018
2414		27 April 2018	Unanimous	Extension of MINURSO mandate until 31 April 2018
2440		31 October 2018	Unanimous	Extension of MINURSO mandate until 30 April 2019
2468		30 April 2019	Unanimous	Extension of MINURSO mandate until 31 October 2019
2494		30 October 2019	Unanimous	Extension of MINURSO mandate until 31 October 2020
2548		30 October 2020	Unanimous	Extension of MINURSO mandate until 31 October 2021
2602		29 October 2021	Russia and Tunisia abstained	Extension of MINURSO mandate until 31 October 2022
2654		27 October 2022	Kenya and Russia abstained	Extension of MINURSO mandate until 31 October 2023
2703		30 October 2023	Mozambique and Russia abstained	Extension of MINURSO mandate until 31 October 2024
2756		31 October 2024	Mozambique and Russia abstained. Algeria did not participate.	Extension of MINURSO mandate until 31 October 2025
2797		31 October 2025	China, Pakistan and Russian Federation abstained. Algeria did not participate.	"full support for the Secretary-General and his Personal Envoy in facilitating and conducting negotiations taking as basis Morocco's Autonomy Proposal with a view to achieving a just, lasting and mutually acceptable resolution to the dispute, consistent with the UN Charter", Extension of MINURSO mandate until 31 October 2026

== General Assembly Resolution ==
No.	Title	Date	Vote
34/37	Question of Western Sahara	21 November 1979	for: 85, against: 6, abstained: 41
35/19	Question of Western Sahara	11 November 1980	for: 88, against: 8, abstained: 43 (non-recorded)

== See also ==
- Political status of Western Sahara
- United Nations General Assembly Resolution
- United Nations Security Council Resolution
