= United Nations Security Council Resolution 2285 =

UN Security Council Resolution 2285
- Date: 29 April 2016
- Meeting no.: 7,684
- Code: S/RES/2285 (Document)
- Subject: The situation concerning Western Sahara
- Voting summary: 10 voted for; 2 voted against; 3 abstained
- Result: Adopted

Security Council composition
- Permanent members: China; France; Russia; United Kingdom; United States
- Non-permanent members: Angola; Egypt; Japan; Malaysia; New Zealand; Senegal; Spain; Ukraine; Uruguay; Venezuela

United Nations Security Council resolution 2285, adopted on 29 April 2016, after recalling and reaffirming previous resolutions regarding Western Sahara.

== Effect ==
The resolution recalled previous support for the efforts of the Secretary-General to implement resolutions 1754 (2007), 1783 (2007), 1813 (2008), 1871 (2009), 1920 (2010), 1979 (2011), 2044 (2012), 2099 (2013), 2152 (2014), and 2218 (2015), the Council extended the mandate of the United Nations Mission for the Referendum in Western Sahara (MINURSO) until 30 April 2017.

The resolution emphasized the urgent need for MINURSO to return to full functionality, following flooding in Tindouf in October 2015, as well as a breakdown in communication between the Polisario Front and the Government of Morocco.

== Vote ==
This vote was controversial. Uruguay and Venezuela both rejected the proposal, while Angola, New Zealand, and Russia abstained. China, Egypt, France, Japan, Malaysia, Senegal, Spain, Ukraine, the United Kingdom, and the United States all voted in favor of the proposal.

Gerard van Bohemen, speaking on the behalf of New Zealand, said that the reason for the country to abstain from the vote was due to a belief that the resolution failed to address the reality of the situation in Western Sahara.

Rafael Ramírez, speaking on the behalf of Venezuela, said that the reason for the country to vote against the resolution was due to a lack of transparency in the mission. He also mentioned efforts on the behalf of the Moroccan government to interfere with the diplomatic work of the ambassador to the region. He mentioned the expulsion of the civilian element of MUNURSO from the region by the Moroccan government, as well as the inability of the Security Council to address the expulsion.

== See also ==
- History of Western Sahara
- List of United Nations Security Council Resolutions 2201-2300 (2015–2016)
- Sahrawi Arab Democratic Republic
- Wall (Western Sahara)
