= Sahrawi Arab Democratic Republic–Spain relations =

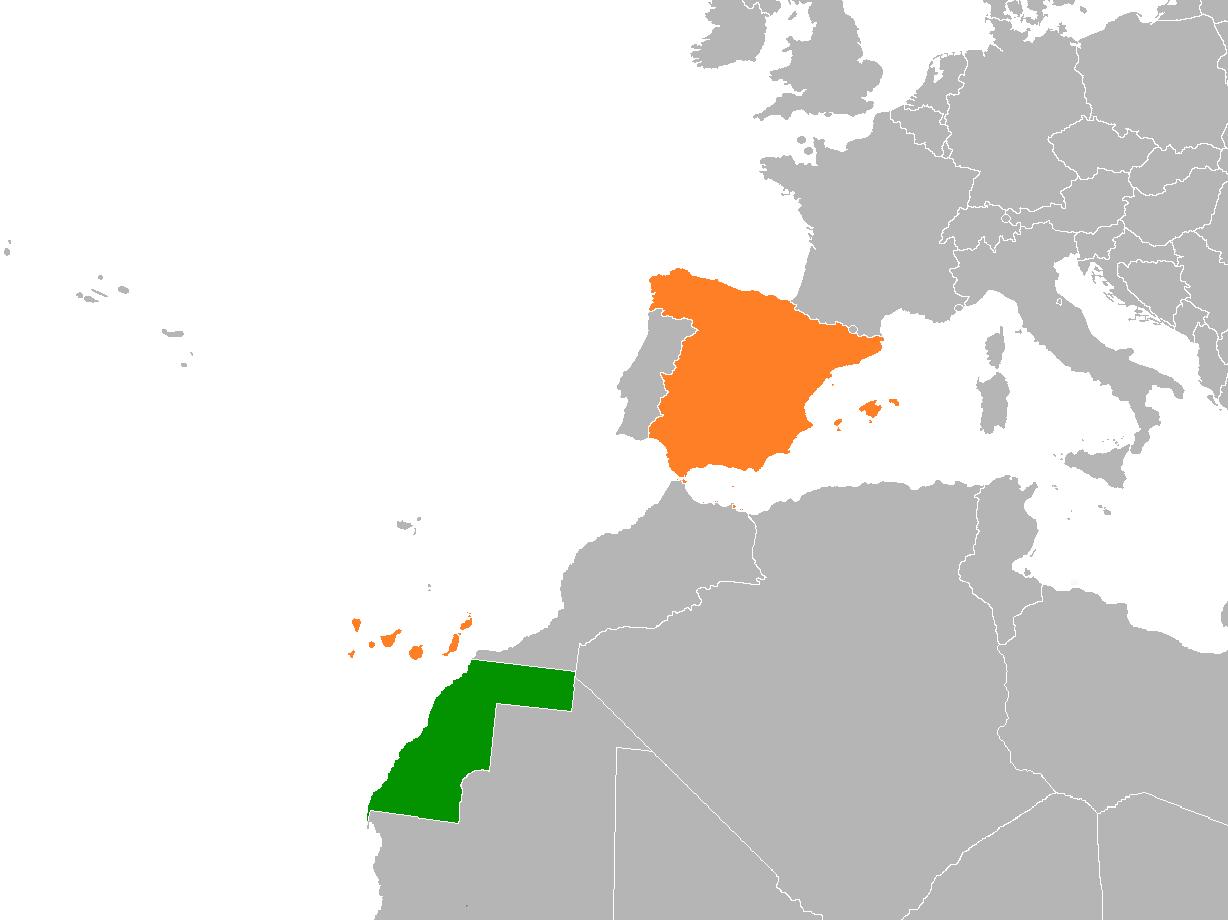

- Sahrawi Arab Democratic Republic: Spain

Sahrawi Arab Democratic Republic–Spain relations are the current and historical relations between the Sahrawi Arab Democratic Republic (also known as Western Sahara) and the Kingdom of Spain.

== History ==
=== Spanish colonization ===
Spanish merchants began arriving to present day Western Sahara as early as the late 1400s. During the Scramble for Africa Spain began occupying land in Western Sahara which was then granted to Spain by the Berlin Conference which allowed Spain to occupy territory from Ras Nouadhibou (Cape Blanc) to Cape Bojador. In 1884, Emilio Bonelli, head of the Spanish Society of Africanists and Colonists (Sociedad Española de Africanistas y Colonistas) traveled to Río de Oro and signed treaties with the coastal peoples. Since then, Spain claimed the coastal portions of the territory and tried to claim more inland territory, however, they were hindered by French claims in Mauritania and by partisan belonging to Ma al-'Aynayn. By 1934, Spain occupied the Western Sahara towns of Smara and La Güera and occupied the two territories of Río de Oro and Saguia el-Hamra.

=== Spanish withdrawal ===
In 1956, Morocco obtained independence from France and immediately laid claim to the territories of Río de Oro and Saguia el-Hamra in 1957. After Morocco claimed the land, Spanish troops succeeded in repelling Moroccan military incursions into the territories. In 1958, Spain united the territories of Río de Oro and Saguia el-Hamra into one and named it "Spanish Sahara". For several decades, Spain's control of the territory became very difficult, especially with Mauritania obtaining its independence in 1960 and claiming Spanish Sahara (Western Sahara) for itself and the fact that phosphate deposits were discovered at Bucraa.

In 1970, a political group was established, calling itself the Polisario Front and made up of mainly native Sahrawi people. In 1974, Spain agreed to hold a referendum on self-determination for Spanish Sahara as originally mandated by the United Nations in 1966, however, the United Nations asked Spain to defer to the International Court of Justice to see if Morocco and Mauritania had claim to the land. In 1974, “The Court's conclusion was that the materials and information presented to it did not establish any tie of territorial sovereignty between the territory of Western Sahara and the Kingdom of Morocco or the Mauritanian entity."

In 1975, Spain agreed to partition part of the territory to Morocco and to Mauritania after it was agreed at the Madrid Accords, however, international protest erupted as it went against the right for Self-determination and the United Nations General Assembly Resolution 1514 (Declaration on the Granting of Independence to Colonial Countries and Peoples). In November 1975, while Generalissimo Francisco Franco was in his last illness, over 350,000 Moroccans and 20,000 Moroccan troops held the "Green March" into Spanish Sahara to force Spain to hand over the disputed territory. After Spanish withdrawal from Western Sahara, the Western Sahara War began. In 1976 the Polisario Front declared a government-in-exile and named their country the "Sahrawi Arab Democratic Republic" (SADR).

=== Post withdrawal ===
Since 1975, official governmental relations between Spain and the exiled-government in Algeria of the Polisario Front are nearly non-existent. Since 1997, there have been several United Nations resolutions concerning Western Sahara. In April 1991, the United Nations adopted United Nations Mission for the Referendum in Western Sahara (MINURSO). In 2003, Spain, as a non-permanent member of the United Nations Security Council voted in favor for United Nations Security Council Resolution 1463 and United Nations Security Council Resolution 1495 to extend the mandate of the United Nations Mission for the Referendum in Western Sahara (MINURSO).

For several years, Secretary General of the Polisario Front and President of the Sahrawi Arab Democratic Republic, Mohamed Abdelaziz, paid numerous visits to Spain advocating for SADR independence. In 1992, Mohamed Abdelaziz met with Spanish Prime Minister Felipe González. President Abdelaziz also met with Prime Minister José Luis Rodríguez Zapatero in November 2004. In March 2017, Spanish Foreign Minister Alfonso Dastis affirmed Spain's support to a solution for the Sahrawi people.

== Spanish assistance ==
Although there are no official relations between Spain and the Sahrawi Arab Democratic Republic; the Spanish government, through the Spanish Agency for International Development Cooperation, donates monetary and humanitarian assistance to Sahrawi refugee camps based in Tindouf Province of Algeria. In 2010, the Spanish aid agency donated US$12 million to the World Food Programme in the camps and 200,000 Euros for flood relief which affected the camps in 2015. Humanitarian and development projects are provided also by Asociación Amal Esperanza, Cádiz, and others humanitarian NGO.

== Partner non-governmental organizations ==
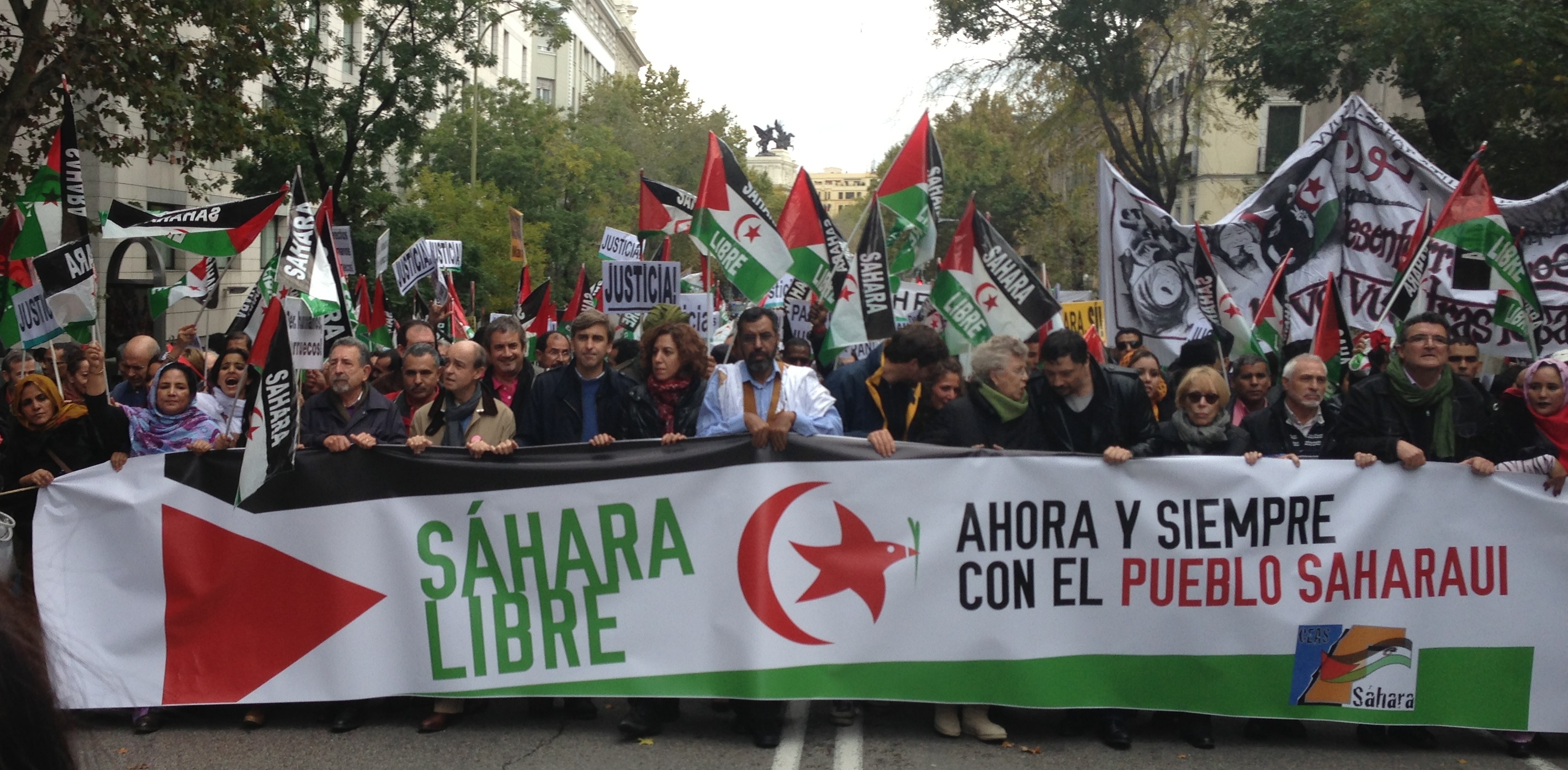
Demonstration in support of the independence of Western Sahara in Madrid; 2012

In Spain, many organizations for support of Sahrawi cause were established. There are Asociación Amigos del Pueblo Saharaui-Alcobendas, Asociación Granadina de Amistad con la RASD, Asociaciones de Amigos del Sahara de Valladolid, Cantabria por el Sáhara, Um-Draiga, Amigos del Sahara Libre, Sadicum, CEAS-Sahara, Solidariedade Galega co o Pobo Saharaui, Bir Lehlu, Federació ACAPS, YALAH, Federación Provincial de Cádiz de Asociaciones Solidarias con el Sahara, and many others. They inform civil society about the problems of the Sahrawi people, they organise a variety of activities, including petitions and Sahrawi support demonstrations.

== Diplomatic mission ==
- The Sahrawi Arab Democratic Republic has a network of delegations of the Polisario Front in place of an embassy pending Spanish recognition. There is a delegation per every autonomous community, together with a central delegation in Madrid.

== See also ==
- Foreign relations of the Sahrawi Arab Democratic Republic
- Foreign relations of Spain
- International recognition of the Sahrawi Arab Democratic Republic
- Political status of Western Sahara
- Sahrawi people
