= United Nations Security Council Resolution 1979 =

UN Security Council Resolution 1979
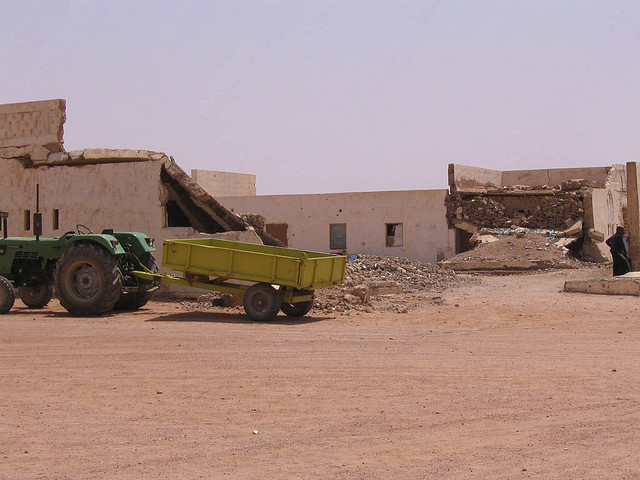
- Bomb damage in the town of Tifariti from the Western Sahara conflict
- Date: 27 April 2011
- Meeting no.: 6,523
- Code: S/RES/1979 (Document)
- Subject: The situation concerning Western Sahara
- Voting summary: 15 voted for; None voted against; None abstained
- Result: Adopted

Security Council composition
- Permanent members: China; France; Russia; United Kingdom; United States
- Non-permanent members: Bosnia–Herzegovina; Brazil; Colombia; Germany; Gabon; India; Lebanon; Nigeria; Portugal; South Africa

United Nations Security Council Resolution 1979, adopted unanimously on April 27, 2011, after reaffirming all previous resolutions on the Western Sahara including 1754 (2007), 1783 (2007), 1813 (2008), 1871 (2009) and 1920 (2010), the Council discussed prospects for a settlement of the dispute and extended the mandate of the United Nations Mission for the Referendum in Western Sahara (MINURSO) until April 30, 2012.

The resolution did not include a monitoring mechanism for human rights in the mandate of MINURSO, amid disagreements among diplomats. The Security Council was criticised by some nations including South Africa and Nigeria of hypocrisy–where MINURSO would be the only United Nations peacekeeping mission without a human rights mandate. However, it did mention human rights for the first time. Both Morocco and the Polisario Front welcomed the resolution; Morocco praised it for recognizing Morocco's offer of autonomy to Western Sahara, while the Polisario Front noted the increased use of human rights language in the text.

== Resolution ==
=== Observations ===
The Security Council reaffirmed its commitment in assisting Morocco and the Polisario Front for a lasting, mutually acceptable solution which provides for self-determination for the people of Western Sahara. In this regard, full co-operation was required from the concerned parties and neighbouring states in the region with the United Nations. It noted proposals submitted to the Secretary-General Ban Ki-moon by both parties and invited them to demonstrate their political will to resolve the conflict. At the same time, several rounds of negotiations were also recognised, and stressed the need for both sides to adhere to their obligations, particularly as there was an increase in violations of previous agreements.

The preamble of the resolution also stressed the importance of improving the human rights situation in Western Sahara and the refugee camps in Tindouf, Algeria. It welcomed the establishment of a human rights council in Morocco and the implementation of a refugee protection programme by the United Nations High Commissioner for Refugees (UNHCR) in co-ordination with the Polisario Front. The resolution anticipated family visits by land and by air, with full co-operation from the UNHCR.

Meanwhile, the Council determined that the status quo was unacceptable, and welcomed the commitment of both sides to continue negotiations for the benefit of the people in the territory.

== Acts ==
Both parties were urged to adhere to the military agreements reached with MINURSO regarding a ceasefire. The parties were called upon to continue to show political will and continue unconditional negotiations under the auspices of the Secretary-General, and the commitment of Morocco and the Polisario Front to hold talks in preparation for a fifth round of negotiations was welcomed by the Council. Assistance was from other countries was invited in this regard, including funding for confidence-building measures such as family visits.

Finally, the Secretary-General was requested to keep the Council regularly informed on progress made during the negotiations and reflect on difficulties facing MINURSO. He was also required to make sure both parties complied with MINURSO with regards to the United Nations sexual exploitation and abuse policy and for troop-contributing countries to ensure full accountability.

== See also ==
- History of Western Sahara
- Legal status of Western Sahara
- List of United Nations Security Council Resolutions 1901 to 2000 (2009–2011)
- Sahrawi Arab Democratic Republic
- Wall (Western Sahara)
