= United Nations Security Council Resolution 1920 =

UN Security Council Resolution 1920
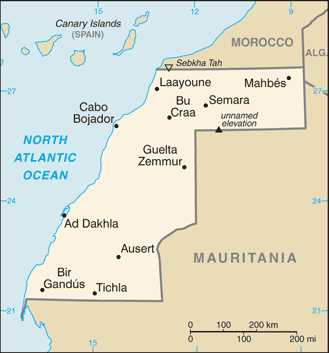
- Western Sahara
- Date: 30 April 2010
- Meeting no.: 6,305
- Code: S/RES/1920 (Document)
- Subject: The situation concerning Western Sahara
- Voting summary: 15 voted for; None voted against; None abstained
- Result: Adopted

Security Council composition
- Permanent members: China; France; Russia; United Kingdom; United States
- Non-permanent members: Austria; Bosnia–Herzegovina; Brazil; Gabon; Japan; Lebanon; Mexico; Nigeria; Turkey; Uganda

United Nations Security Council Resolution 1920, adopted unanimously on April 30, 2010, after reaffirming all previous resolutions on the Western Sahara including 1754 (2007), 1783 (2007), 1813 (2008) and 1871 (2009), the Council discussed prospects for a settlement of the dispute and extended the mandate of the United Nations Mission for the Referendum in Western Sahara (MINURSO) until April 30, 2011.

The Security Council reaffirmed its commitment in assisting Morocco and the Polisario Front for a lasting, mutually acceptable solution which provides for self-determination for the people of Western Sahara. In this regard, full co-operation was required from the concerned parties and neighbouring states in the region with the United Nations. It noted proposals submitted to the Secretary-General Ban Ki-moon by both parties and invited them to demonstrate their political will to resolve the conflict. At the same time, several rounds of negotiations were also recognised, and stressed the need for both sides to adhere to their obligations to make progress on the "human dimension" of the conflict.

The resolution anticipated family visits by land and by air, with full co-operation with the United Nations High Commissioner for Refugees. It was recognised that the status quo was unacceptable, and welcomed the commitment of both sides to continue negotiations for the benefit of the people in the territory.

Both parties were then urged to adhere to the military agreements reached with MINURSO regarding a ceasefire. The parties were called upon to continue to show political will and continue unconditional negotiations under the auspices of the Secretary-General. Assistance was from other countries was invited in this regard, including funding for confidence-building measures such as family visits.

Finally, the Secretary-General was requested to keep the Council regularly informed on progress made during the negotiations, providing a report before the end of MINURSO's mandate period, set at April 30, 2011. He was also required to make sure both parties complied with MINURSO with regard to the United Nations sexual exploitation and abuse policy and for troop-contributing countries to ensure full accountability.

The resolution avoided mention of human rights, due to disagreements over its use in resolutions by some members of the council. Austria, Mexico, Nigeria, Uganda, the United Kingdom and United States supported its inclusion while China did not. Other members of the council, such as Mexico and Nigeria, were concerned that only a small number of Council members were involved in consultations regarding the resolution and the absence of a mention of Resolution 690 (1991) which formed MINURSO's original mandate. Both Morocco and the Polisario Front welcomed the adoption of Resolution 1920 as a basis for further negotiations, but disputed the issue of human rights in the territory.

== See also ==
- History of Western Sahara
- Legal status of Western Sahara
- List of United Nations Security Council Resolutions 1901 to 2000 (2009–2011)
- Sahrawi Arab Democratic Republic
- Wall (Western Sahara)
