= United Nations Security Council Resolution 1720 =

UN Security Council Resolution 1720
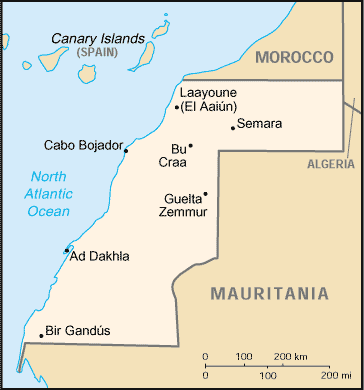
- Western Sahara
- Date: 31 October 2006
- Meeting no.: 5,560
- Code: S/RES/1720 (Document)
- Subject: The situation concerning Western Sahara
- Voting summary: 15 voted for; None voted against; None abstained
- Result: Adopted

Security Council composition
- Permanent members: China; France; Russia; United Kingdom; United States
- Non-permanent members: Argentina; Rep. of the Congo; Denmark; Ghana; Greece; Japan; Peru; Qatar; Slovakia; Tanzania

United Nations Security Council Resolution 1720 was a resolution adopted unanimously on October 31, 2006, after recalling all previous resolutions on the situation in Western Sahara, including resolutions 1495 (2003), 1541 (2004) and 1675 (2006). With this, the Council extended the mandate of the United Nations Mission for the Referendum in Western Sahara (MINURSO) for six months until April 30, 2007.

Of the fifteen members of the Security Council, 14 approved a draft resolution that included a provision expressing concern about Moroccan human rights abuses in the occupied territory; only France objected, and thus the paragraph was omitted from the final text. The United States had suggested wrapping up the mission during discussions prior to the adoption of Resolution 1720.

== Resolution ==
=== Observations ===
The Security Council reaffirmed the need for a durable and mutual solution to the Western Sahara problem, which would provide for the self-determination of the people of the territory. Both Morocco, the Polisario Front and regional states were urged to co-operate with the United Nations to end the political impasse and reach a solution to the long-running dispute.

=== Acts ===
All parties were called upon to respect military agreements reached with MINURSO regarding a ceasefire. Member States were called upon to consider contributing towards confidence-building measures to facilitate greater person-to-person contact, such as family visits. The mandate of MINURSO was extended and the Secretary-General Kofi Annan instructed to report on the situation in Western Sahara. Furthermore, he was also instructed to ensure greater compliance with the zero-tolerance sexual exploitation policy among MINURSO personnel.

== See also ==
- Free Zone (region)
- Legal status of Western Sahara
- List of United Nations Security Council Resolutions 1701 to 1800 (2006–2008)
- Moroccan Wall
- Sahrawi Arab Democratic Republic
