= United Nations Security Council Resolution 1675 =

UN Security Council Resolution 1675
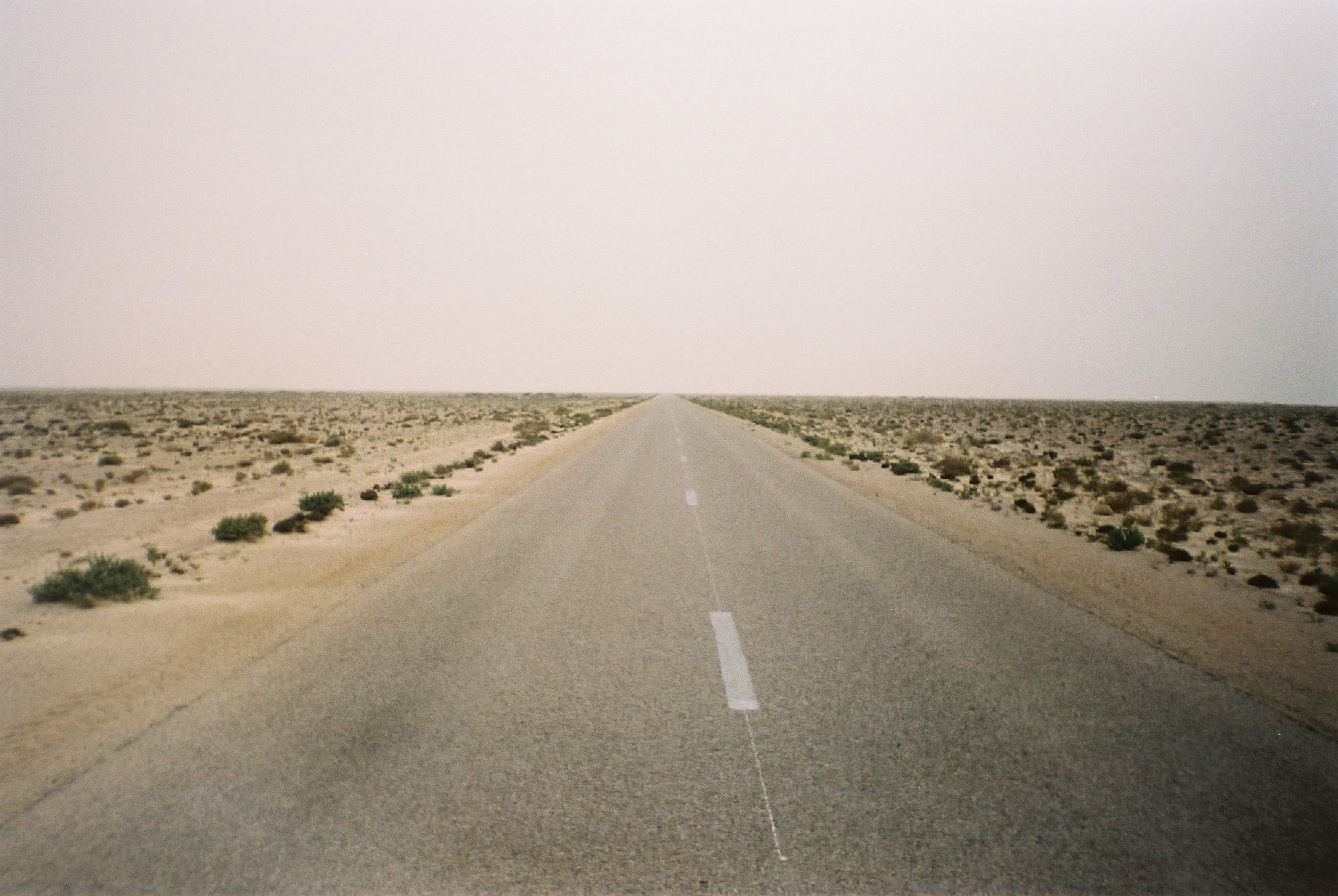
- Open road in Western Sahara
- Date: 28 April 2006
- Meeting no.: 5,431
- Code: S/RES/1675 (Document)
- Subject: The situation concerning Western Sahara
- Voting summary: 15 voted for; None voted against; None abstained
- Result: Adopted

Security Council composition
- Permanent members: China; France; Russia; United Kingdom; United States
- Non-permanent members: Argentina; Rep. of the Congo; Denmark; Ghana; Greece; Japan; Peru; Qatar; Slovakia; Tanzania

United Nations Security Council Resolution 1675, adopted unanimously on April 28, 2006, after recalling all previous resolutions on the situation in Western Sahara, including resolutions 1495 (2003), 1541 (2004) and 1634 (2005), the Council extended the mandate of the United Nations Mission for the Referendum in Western Sahara (MINURSO) until October 31, 2006.

== Resolution ==
=== Observations ===
The Security Council reaffirmed the need for a durable and mutual solution to the Western Sahara problem, which would provide for the self-determination of the people of the territory. Both Morocco, the Polisario Front and regional states were urged to co-operate with the United Nations to end the political impasse and reach a solution to the long-running dispute.

=== Acts ===
All parties were called upon to respect military agreements reached with MINURSO regarding a ceasefire. Member States were called upon to consider contributing towards confidence-building measures to facilitate greater person-to-person contact, such as family visits. The mandate of MINURSO was extended and the Secretary-General Kofi Annan instructed to report on the situation in Western Sahara. Furthermore, he was also instructed to ensure greater compliance with the zero-tolerance sexual exploitation policy among MINURSO personnel.

== See also ==
- Free Zone (region)
- Legal status of Western Sahara
- List of United Nations Security Council Resolutions 1601 to 1700 (2005–2006)
- Moroccan Wall
- Sahrawi Arab Democratic Republic
