= United Nations Security Council Resolution 1634 =

UN Security Council Resolution 1634
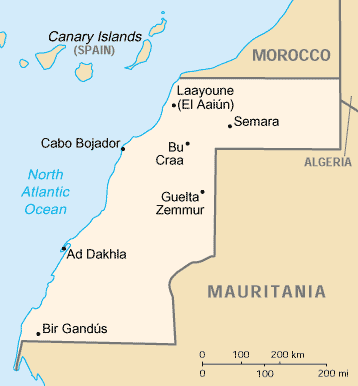
- Western Sahara
- Date: 28 October 2005
- Meeting no.: 5,295
- Code: S/RES/1634 (Document)
- Subject: The situation concerning Western Sahara
- Voting summary: 15 voted for; None voted against; None abstained
- Result: Adopted

Security Council composition
- Permanent members: China; France; Russia; United Kingdom; United States
- Non-permanent members: Algeria; Argentina; Benin; Brazil; Denmark; Greece; Japan; Philippines; Romania; Tanzania

United Nations Security Council Resolution 1634, adopted unanimously on 28 October 2005, after recalling all previous resolutions on the situation in Western Sahara, including resolutions 1495 (2003), 1541 (2004) and 1598 (2005), the Council extended the mandate of the United Nations Mission for the Referendum in Western Sahara (MINURSO) until 30 April 2006.

The resolution marked the 28th extension of MINURSO's mandate.

== Resolution ==
=== Observations ===
The Security Council reaffirmed the need for a durable and mutual solution to the Western Sahara problem, which would provide for the self-determination of the people of the territory. Both Morocco, the Polisario Front and regional states were urged to co-operate with the United Nations to end the political impasse and reach a solution to the long-running dispute.

The Council noted the release of 404 Moroccan prisoners of war in accordance with international humanitarian law while it, along with Morocco, had to co-operate with the International Committee of the Red Cross to determine the fate of persons missing since the start of the conflict. The appointment of Peter van Walsum as Personal Envoy of the Secretary-General for Western Sahara was welcomed.

=== Acts ===
All parties were called upon to respect military agreements reached with MINURSO. Member States were called upon to consider contributing towards confidence-building measures to facilitate greater person-to-person contact, such as family visits. The mandate of MINURSO was extended and the Secretary-General Kofi Annan instructed to report on the situation in Western Sahara and for the Personal Envoy to provide a briefing within three months on progress made in the territory.

== See also ==
- Baker Plan
- Free Zone (region)
- Political status of Western Sahara
- List of United Nations Security Council Resolutions 1601 to 1700 (2005–2006)
- Moroccan Wall
- Sahrawi Arab Democratic Republic
