= Alexander Ivanko =

Russian journalist and UN diplomat

Alexander Sergeyevich Ivanko (Russian: Александр Сергеевич Иванько born March 7, 1962, in Moscow) is an international civil servant, currently serving as the United Nations Mission for the Referendum in Western Sahara and head of the United Nations Mission for the Referendum in Western Sahara.

== Biography ==
Ivanko was born on March 7, 1962, in Moscow. His father, Sergey Sergeyevich Ivanko, was a Soviet journalist and diplomat. Alexander graduated from the Faculty of Journalism, Moscow State University in 1984.

== Journalism career ==
He began his career as a journalist with the newspaper Izvestia, where he worked from 1984 to 1994, covering significant events such as the war in Afghanistan in 1989. From 1992 to 1994, he worked for the newspaper We/Mi, a joint project with the Hearst corporation.

== Work in international institutions ==
Since 1994, Ivanko has worked for the UN, starting as a member of the UNPROFOR mission in Bosnia and Herzegovina, and later serving as the UN spokesperson in the same country. From 2006 to 2009, he was Director of Public Information for the UNMIK mission, and then Chief of Staff for the MINURSO mission until 2021.

== Appointment as Special Representative ==
In August 2021, the UN Secretary-General, António Guterres, appointed Ivanko as the Special Representative for Western Sahara.
