= United Nations Security Council Resolution 1754 =

UN Security Council Resolution 1754
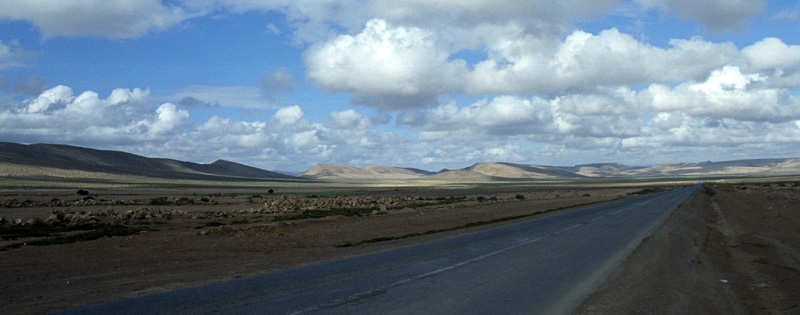
- Western Sahara
- Date: 30 April 2007
- Meeting no.: 5,669
- Code: S/RES/1754 (Document)
- Subject: The situation concerning Western Sahara
- Voting summary: 15 voted for; None voted against; None abstained
- Result: Adopted

Security Council composition
- Permanent members: China; France; Russia; United Kingdom; United States
- Non-permanent members: Belgium; Rep. of the Congo; Ghana; Indonesia; Italy; Panama; Peru; Qatar; Slovakia; South Africa

United Nations Security Council Resolution 1754, adopted unanimously on April 30, 2007, after recalling all previous resolutions on the situation in Western Sahara, the Council extended the mandate of the United Nations Mission for the Referendum in Western Sahara (MINURSO) for six months until October 31, 2007.

== Resolution ==
=== Observations ===
The Security Council reaffirmed the need for a durable and mutual solution to the Western Sahara problem, which would provide for the self-determination of the people of the territory. Both Morocco, the Polisario Front and regional states were urged to co-operate with the United Nations to end the political impasse and reach a solution to the long-running dispute.

The preamble of the resolution also welcomed "serious and credible" efforts by Morocco to resolve the dispute, and also a proposal presented by the Polisario Front.

=== Acts ===
All parties were called upon to respect military agreements reached with MINURSO regarding a ceasefire, and to enter into negotiations without preconditions. Member States were called upon to consider contributing towards confidence-building measures to facilitate greater person-to-person contact, such as family visits.

The mandate of MINURSO was extended and the Secretary-General Ban Ki-moon instructed to report on the situation in Western Sahara by June 30, 2007. Furthermore, he was also instructed to ensure greater compliance with the zero-tolerance sexual exploitation policy among MINURSO personnel.

== See also ==
- Free Zone (region)
- List of United Nations resolutions concerning Western Sahara
- Legal status of Western Sahara
- List of United Nations Security Council Resolutions 1701 to 1800 (2006–2008)
- Manhasset negotiations
- Moroccan Wall
- Sahrawi Arab Democratic Republic
