= United Nations Security Council Resolution 2152 =

UN Security Council Resolution 2152
- Date: 29 April 2014
- Voting summary: 15 voted for; None voted against; None abstained
- Result: Adopted

Security Council composition
- Permanent members: China; France; Russia; United Kingdom; United States
- Non-permanent members: Argentina; Australia; Chad; Chile; Jordan; South Korea; Lithuania; Luxembourg; Nigeria; Rwanda

United Nations Security Council Resolution 2152 was adopted in 2014. It concerns the "extension of the mandate of the UN mission for the Referendum in Western Sahara (MINURSO) until 30 April 2015." It was adopted unanimously.

== See also ==
- List of United Nations Security Council resolutions 2101 to 2200
