= United Nations Security Council Resolution 2099 =

UN Security Council Resolution 2099
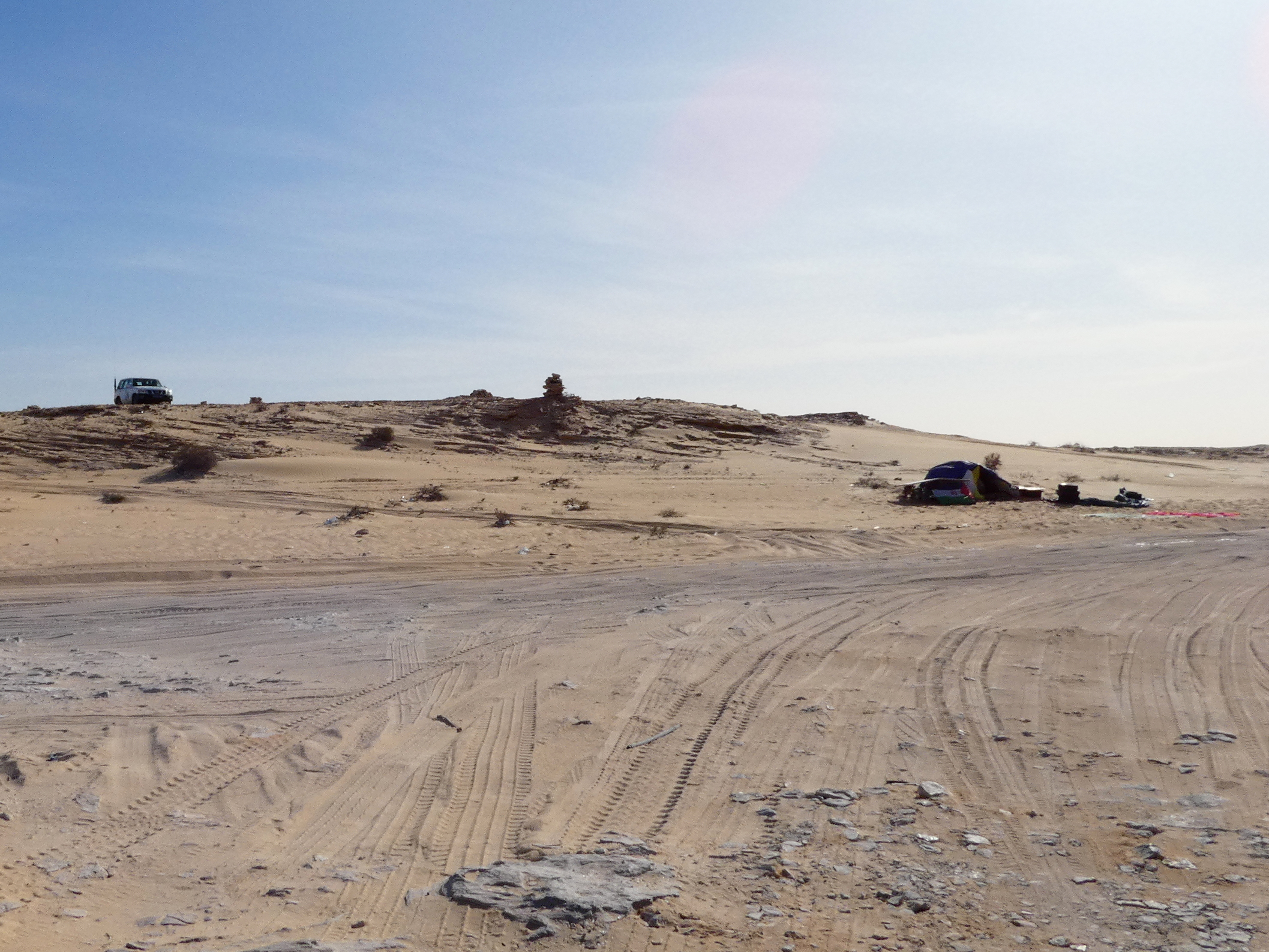
- UN patrol in the Western Sahara
- Date: 25 April 2013
- Meeting no.: 6951
- Code: S/RES/2099 (Document)
- Voting summary: 15 voted for; None voted against; None abstained
- Result: Adopted

Security Council composition
- Permanent members: China; France; Russia; United Kingdom; United States
- Non-permanent members: Argentina; Australia; Azerbaijan; Guatemala; South Korea; Luxembourg; Morocco; Pakistan; Rwanda; Togo

United Nations Security Council resolution 2099 was adopted in 2013.

== See also ==
- List of United Nations Security Council Resolutions 2101 to 2200 (2013–2015)
