= United Nations Security Council Resolution 1813 =

UN Security Council Resolution 1813
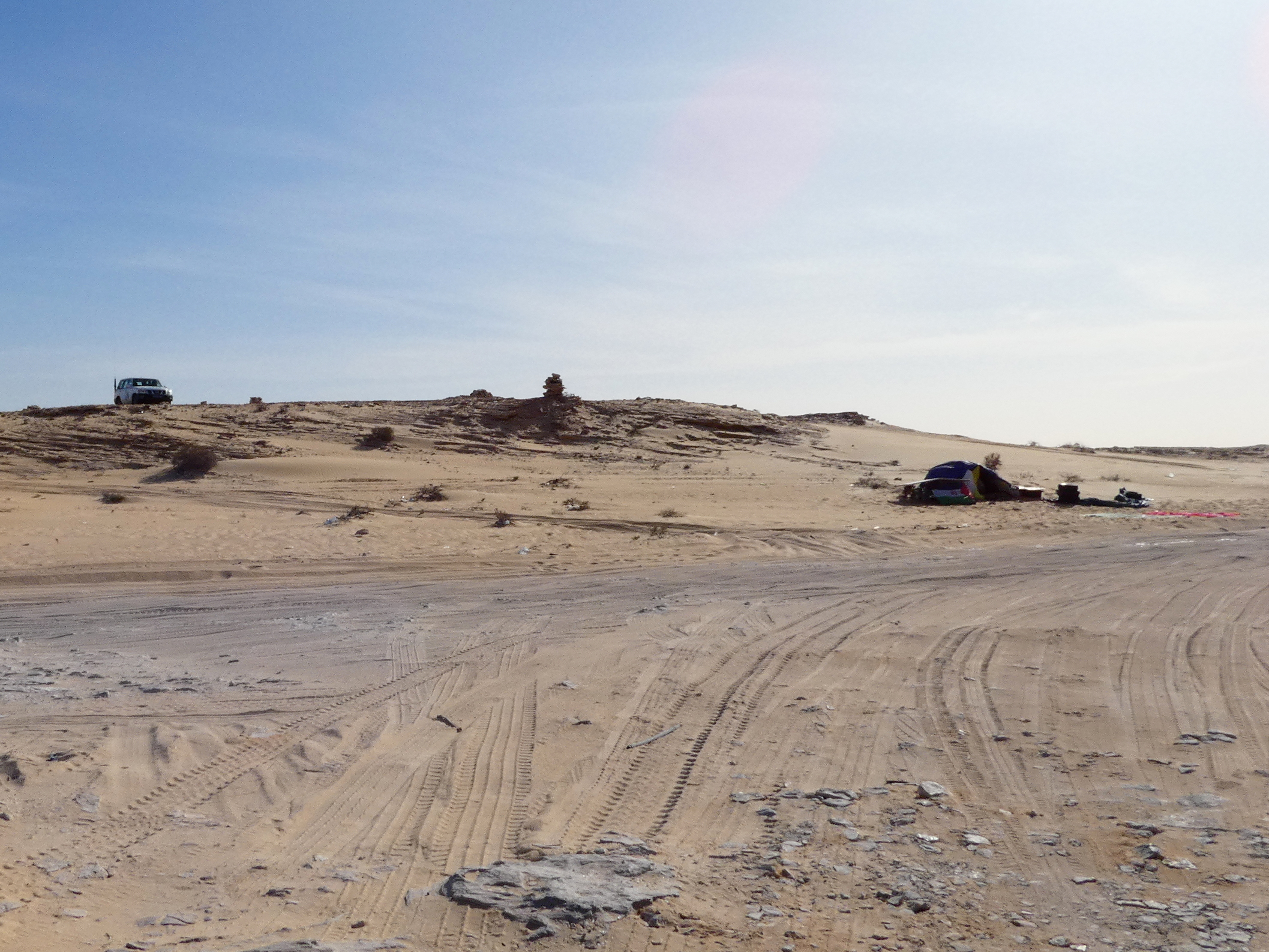
- UN patrol in the Western Sahara
- Date: 30 April 2008
- Meeting no.: 5,884
- Code: S/RES/1813 (Document)
- Subject: The situation concerning Western Sahara
- Voting summary: 15 voted for; None voted against; None abstained
- Result: Adopted

Security Council composition
- Permanent members: China; France; Russia; United Kingdom; United States
- Non-permanent members: Burkina Faso; Belgium; Costa Rica; Croatia; Indonesia; Italy; Libya; Panama; South Africa; Vietnam

United Nations Security Council Resolution 1813 was unanimously adopted on 30 April 2008.

== Resolution ==
Following extensive consultations, the Security Council this evening extended the mandate of the United Nations Mission for the Referendum in Western Sahara (MINURSO) for one year, until 30 April 2009.

In unanimously adopting resolution 1813 (2008), the Council reaffirmed its commitment to assist the parties to achieve a just, lasting and mutually acceptable political solution, which would provide for the self-determination of the people of Western Sahara.

Parties were called on to continue negotiations – under the Secretary-General's auspices – with a view to achieving a just, lasting and mutually acceptable political solution in the context of arrangements consistent with the principles and purposes of the Charter of the United Nations.

Member States were urged to provide voluntary contributions to fund measures allowing for increased contact between separated family members, especially family visits, as well as for other confidence-building measures that might be agreed between the parties.

The Council reiterated its call for cooperation between parties and States of the region, while taking note of the Moroccan proposal presented on 11 April 2007 to the Secretary-General and welcoming serious and credible Moroccan efforts to move the process forward towards resolution. The Council also noted the proposal presented by the Popular Front for the Liberation of Saguia el-Hamra and Rio de Oro (Polisario Front) to the Secretary-General on 10 April 2007.

The Council welcomed the agreement of the parties expressed in the Communiqué of the Personal Envoy of the Secretary-General for Western Sahara of 18 March 2008 to explore the establishment of family visits by land, which would be in addition to the existing program by air, and encouraging them to do so in cooperation with the United Nations High Commissioner for Refugees.

== See also ==
- List of United Nations Security Council Resolutions 1801 to 1900 (2008–2009)
