= United Nations Security Council Resolution 1871 =

UN Security Council Resolution 1871
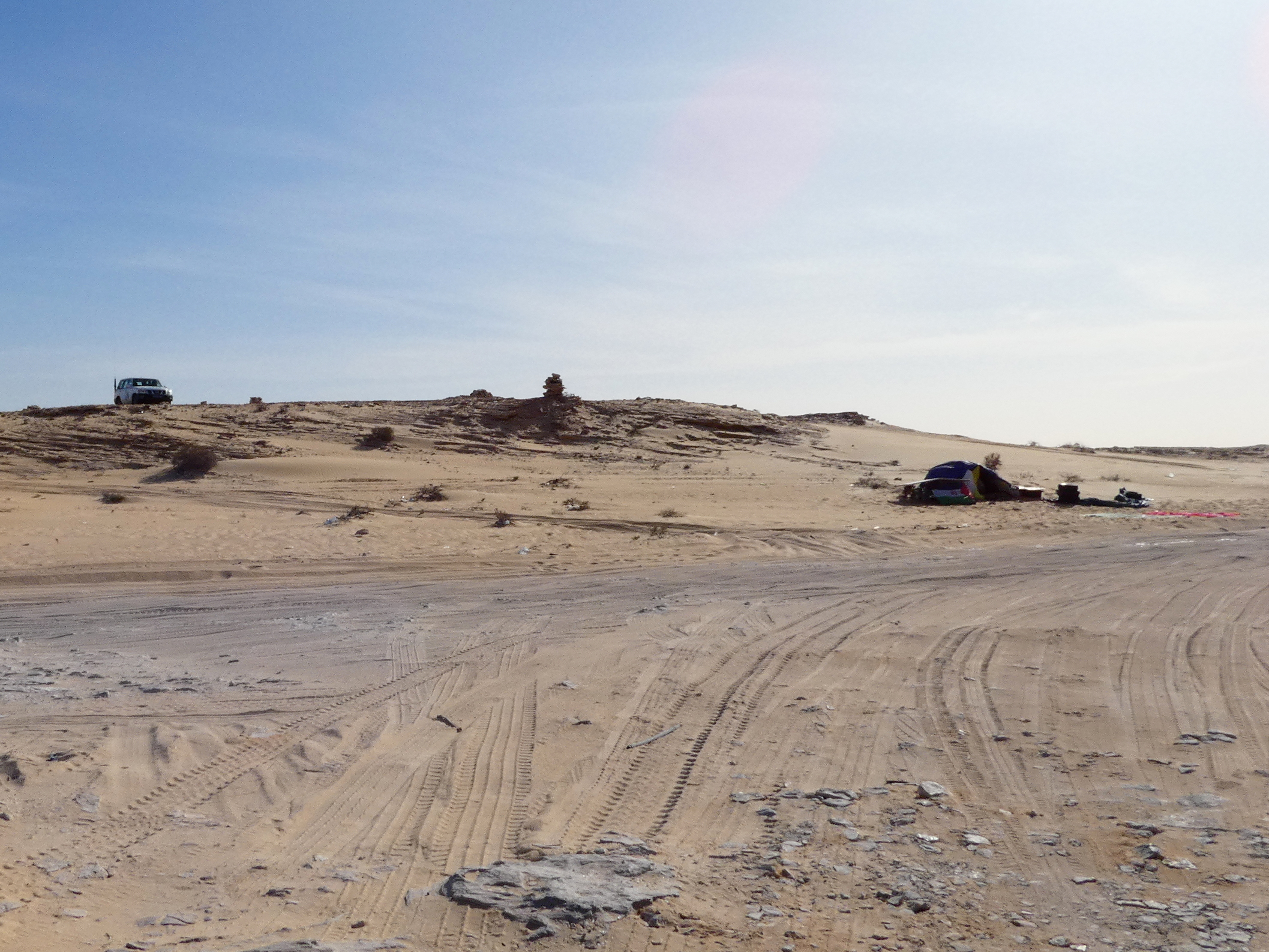
- UN patrol in the Western Sahara
- Date: 30 April 2009
- Meeting no.: 6,117
- Code: S/RES/1871 (Document)
- Subject: The situation concerning Western Sahara
- Voting summary: 15 voted for; None voted against; None abstained
- Result: Adopted

Security Council composition
- Permanent members: China; France; Russia; United Kingdom; United States
- Non-permanent members: Austria; Burkina Faso; Costa Rica; Croatia; Japan; Libya; Mexico; Turkey; Uganda; Vietnam

United Nations Security Council Resolution 1871, which extended the mandate of the United Nations Mission for the Referendum in Western Sahara (MINURSO) by one year, was unanimously adopted on 30 April 2009.

== Resolution ==
The Security Council extended the mandate of the United Nations Mission for the Referendum in Western Sahara (MINURSO) by one year, until 30 April 2010.

Unanimously adopting resolution 1871 (2009), as orally amended, the Council called upon the parties to continue negotiations under the auspices of the Secretary-General without preconditions and in good faith, with a view to achieving a just, lasting and mutually acceptable political solution, which would provide for the self-determination of the people of Western Sahara in the context of arrangements consistent with the principles and purposes of the Charter of the United Nations.

The Council welcomed the parties’ agreement with the Personal Envoy's suggestion to hold small, informal talks in preparation for a fifth round of negotiations, recalling its endorsement of the previous report's recommendation that realism and a spirit of compromise by the parties were essential to achieve progress in negotiations. It called upon the parties to continue to work in an atmosphere propitious for dialogue in order to enter into a more intensive and substantive phase of negotiations.

After adoption, speakers expressed satisfaction with the unanimity of the vote, which sent a message to the parties that progress in negotiations should be made. In that regard, they expressed support for the Special Envoy's proposal to hold small, informal talks before a fifth round of negotiations in Manhasset would begin.

Some speakers emphasized the importance of respect for human rights and welcomed in that regard preambular paragraphs 7 and 8, as orally amended. The representative of Costa Rica, however, emphasizing that political will to reach results was the foundation of mediation, which must be based on absolute respect for the United Nations Charter and for human rights, expressed regret that his proposal to ask for a report on the efforts of the High Commissioner of Human Rights in Western Sahara had not been reflected in the text. That proposal was based on the Secretary-General's recommendations in his last two reports.

== See also ==
- List of United Nations Security Council Resolutions 1801 to 1900 (2008–2009)
