= United Nations Security Council Resolution 1783 =

UN Security Council Resolution 1783
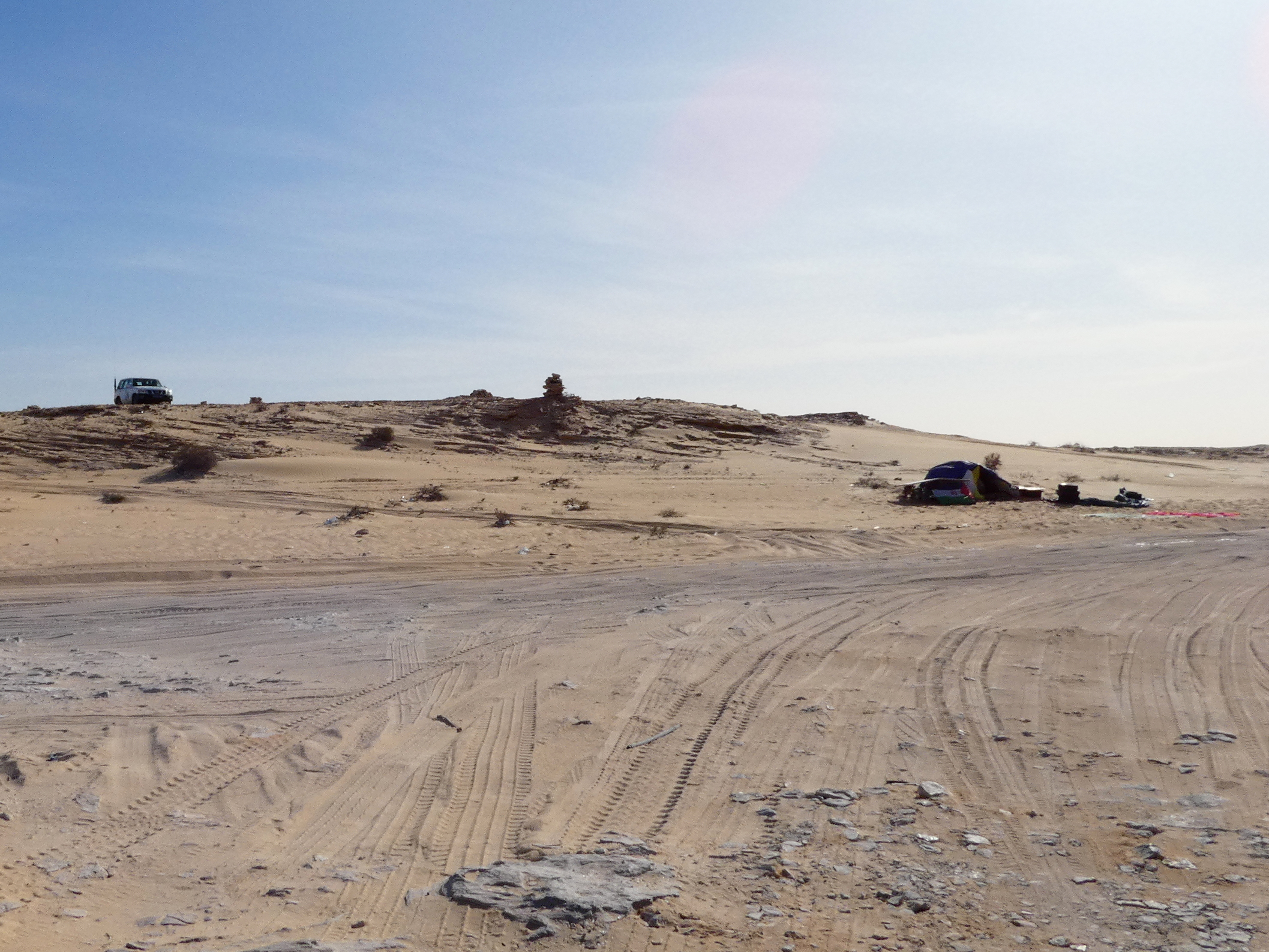
- UN patrol in the Western Sahara
- Date: 31 October 2007
- Meeting no.: 5,773
- Code: S/RES/1783 (Document)
- Subject: The situation concerning Western Sahara
- Voting summary: 15 voted for; None voted against; None abstained
- Result: Adopted

Security Council composition
- Permanent members: China; France; Russia; United Kingdom; United States
- Non-permanent members: Belgium; Rep. of the Congo; Ghana; Indonesia; Italy; Panama; Peru; Qatar; Slovakia; South Africa

United Nations Security Council Resolution 1783 was unanimously adopted on 31 October 2007.

== Resolution ==
The Security Council extended the mandate of the United Nations Mission for the Referendum in Western Sahara (MINURSO) for six months, until 30 April 2008.

In the unanimously adopted resolution 1783 (2007), the Council, taking note of the two rounds of negotiations held under the auspices of the Secretary-General and welcoming progress made by the parties to enter into direct negotiations, called upon the parties to continue those negotiations without preconditions and in good faith with a view to achieving a just, lasting and mutually acceptable political solution, which would provide for the self-determination of the people of Western Sahara in the context of arrangements consistent with the principles and purposes of the Charter of the United Nations.

The Council invited Member States to lend appropriate assistance to the talks, and called on them to consider voluntary contributions to fund confidence-building measures that would allow for increased contact between separated family members, as well as for other such measures that might be agreed between the parties.

Before the vote, the representative of South Africa expressed his disappointment that the resolution made no mention of human rights violations in Western Sahara, despite the Secretary-General's call on the parties to remain engaged in a constructive dialogue with the Office of the High Commissioner for Human Rights, with a view to ensuring respect for the human rights of the Western Saharan people. The Council, which was very vocal about human rights violations in other parts of the world, had decided to remain silent in the case of the Western Sahara. That “double standard” meant the Council decisions were often not taken seriously.

== See also ==
- List of United Nations Security Council Resolutions 1701 to 1800 (2006–2008)
