= United Nations Security Council Resolution 1495 =

UN Security Council Resolution 1495
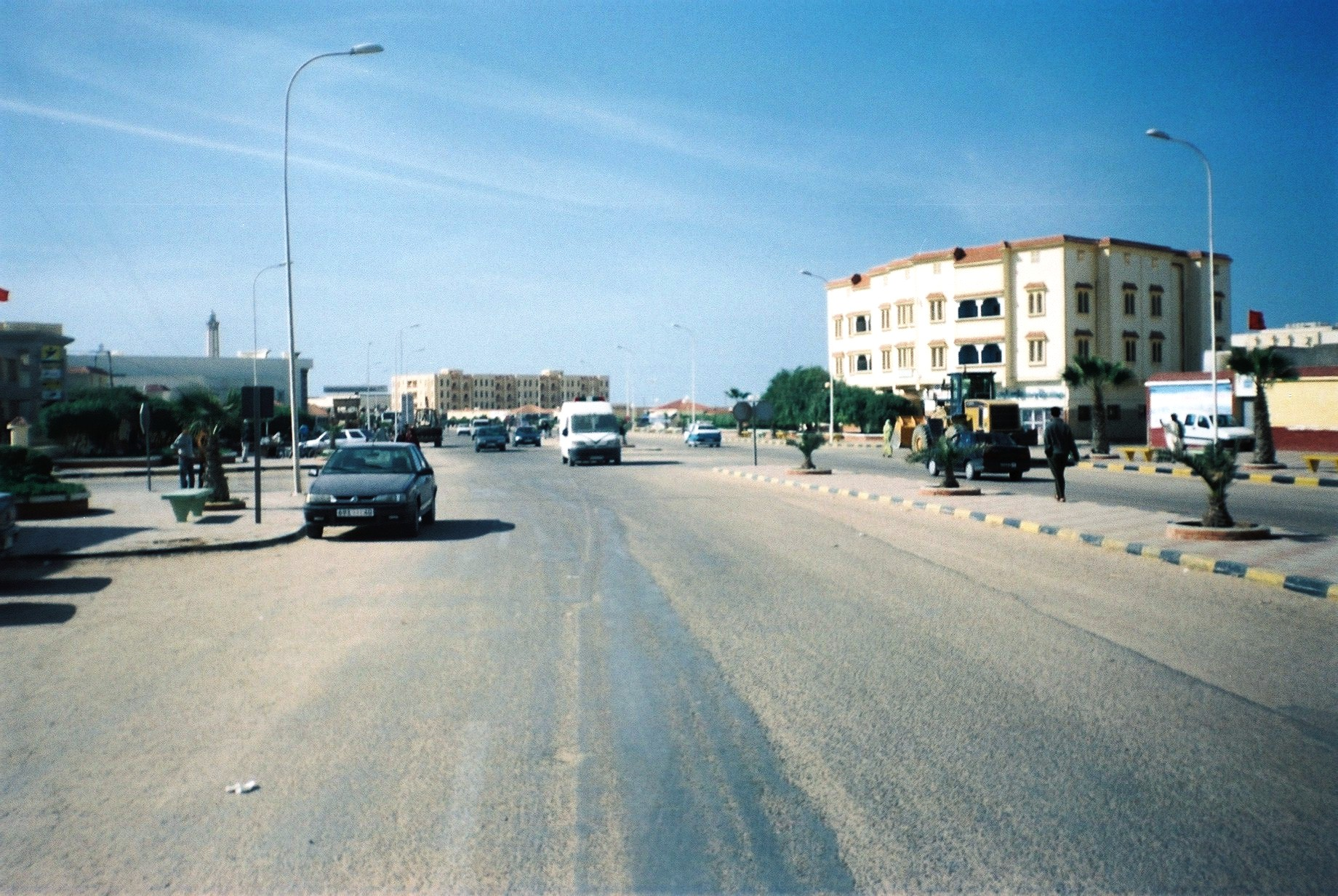
- Boujdour in Western Sahara
- Date: 31 July 2003
- Meeting no.: 4,801
- Code: S/RES/1495 (Document)
- Subject: The situation concerning Western Sahara
- Voting summary: 15 voted for; None voted against; None abstained
- Result: Adopted

Security Council composition
- Permanent members: China; France; Russia; United Kingdom; United States
- Non-permanent members: Angola; Bulgaria; Chile; Cameroon; Germany; Guinea; Mexico; Pakistan; Spain; Syria

United Nations Security Council resolution 1495, adopted unanimously on 31 July 2003, after recalling all previous resolutions on the situation in Western Sahara, particularly Resolution 1429 (2002), the Council extended the mandate of the United Nations Mission for the Referendum in Western Sahara (MINURSO) until 31 October 2003 and supported the Baker Plan put forth by James Baker III, who was at that time the Special Representative for Western Sahara of the Secretary-General Kofi Annan, as a replacement of the 1991 Settlement Plan. The resolution, adopted after significant changes to the original draft, was welcomed by the Polisario Front, which supported the Baker Plan, but not by Morocco, which resisted it.

== Resolution ==
=== Observations ===
The Security Council was concerned at the lack of progress towards a political solution to the dispute between Morocco and the Polisario Front, which remained a potential source of instability to the Maghreb region. It reaffirmed its commitment to assist the parties in achieving a durable solution which will provide for the self-determination of the people of Western Sahara. The parties were commended for their respect of the ceasefire and MINURSO's efforts were also praised.

=== Acts ===
Acting under Chapter VI of the United Nations Charter, the Council supported the Baker Plan as the "optimum political solution" to the dispute and called upon both parties to work towards the acceptance and implementation of the plan. Furthermore, the parties and states in the region were asked to co-operate with the Secretary-General and his Personal Envoy.

The resolution called upon the Polisario Front to release all remaining prisoners of war under international humanitarian law and for both parties to co-operate with the International Committee of the Red Cross to resolve the issue of persons unaccounted for since the start of the conflict. The parties were urged to implement confidence-building measures with the United Nations High Commissioner for Refugees (UNHCR) and for the international community to support the UNHCR and World Food Programme in overcoming the deteriorating food situation among refugees.

Finally, the Secretary-General was asked to provide an assessment of the situation before 31 October 2003.

== See also ==
- Free Zone (region)
- Political status of Western Sahara
- List of United Nations Security Council Resolutions 1401 to 1500 (2002–2003)
- Sahrawi Arab Democratic Republic
- Moroccan Western Sahara Wall
