= Political status of Western Sahara =

Western Sahara, formerly the colony of Spanish Sahara, is a disputed territory claimed by both the Kingdom of Morocco and the Polisario Front (Popular Front for the Liberation of Saguia el-Hamra and Río de Oro), which is an independence movement based in Tindouf. The annexation of Western Sahara by Morocco took place in two stages, in 1976 and 1979, and is considered illegal under international law.

Western Sahara is listed by the United Nations (UN) as a non-decolonized territory and is thus included in the United Nations list of non-self-governing territories, which regards Spain as the de jure administering state. Under international law, Western Sahara is not a legal part of Morocco, and it remains under the international laws of military occupation.

== Background ==
Since the Madrid Accords of 1975, most of Western Sahara has been occupied by Morocco as the Southern Provinces. The smallest and least resourced section, the Liberated Territories, is administered by the Polisario Front as the Sahrawi Arab Democratic Republic (SADR). Mauritania administers the western half of the Ras Nouadhibou Peninsula. An UN-monitored cease-fire has been in effect since September 1991.

No other country than the United States, Israel and Paraguay has ever recognized Morocco's unilateral annexation of Western Sahara; however, certain countries have recognized that Morocco exerts de facto control of the region. Overall, the annexation has not garnered as much attention in the international community as many other disputed annexations (e.g. the Russian annexation of Crimea).

In order to resolve the sovereignty issue, the UN has attempted to hold a referendum through the United Nations Mission for the Referendum in Western Sahara (MINURSO), and is holding direct talks between the Kingdom of Morocco and the Polisario Front. The UN recognizes neither Moroccan nor SADR sovereignty over Western Sahara.

Moroccan settlers currently make up more than two thirds of the 500,000 inhabitants of Western Sahara. Under international law, Morocco's transfer of its own civilians into occupied territory is in direct violation of Article 49 of the Fourth Geneva Convention (cf. Israeli and Turkish settlers).

== Positions of the main parties ==
=== Kingdom of Morocco ===
The official position of the Kingdom of Morocco since 1963 is that all of Western Sahara is an integral part of the kingdom. The Moroccan government refers to Western Sahara only as "Moroccan Sahara", the "Saharan provinces", or the "Southern Provinces".

According to the Moroccan government, in 1958 the Moroccan Army of Liberation fought Spanish colonizers and almost liberated what was then Spanish Sahara. The fathers of many of the Polisario leaders were among the veterans of the Moroccan Southern Army, for example the father of Polisario leader Mohammed Abdelaziz. Morocco is supported in this view by a number of former Polisario founders and leaders. The Polisario Front is considered by Morocco to be a Moroccan separatist movement, referring to the Moroccan origins of most of its founding members.

On 22 January 2020, Morocco's House of Representatives voted unanimously to add Western Sahara waters to the Moroccan maritime borders.

=== Polisario Front and the Sahrawi Arab Democratic Republic ===
The Polisario Front, mainly backed by Algeria, is described by itself and its supporters as a national liberation movement that opposes Moroccan control of Western Sahara, whilst it is considered by Morocco and supporters of Morocco's claims over Western Sahara to be a separatist organization. It began as a movement of students who felt torn between the divergent Spanish and Moroccan influences on the country. The original goal of the Polisario, which was to end Spanish colonialism in the region, was achieved, but their neighbors, Morocco and Mauritania, seized sovereignty of the region, which the Polisario felt was entitled to self-determination and eventually independence. The Polisario engaged in guerrilla warfare with the Moroccan and Mauritanian forces. It evacuated the Sahrawi population to the Tindouf refugee camps due to Royal Moroccan Air Force bombing of the refugee camps on Sahrawi land with napalm and white phosphorus. The Polisario Front has called for the self-determination of the people of Western Sahara to be decided through a referendum. Although the SADR is not recognized as a state by the UN, the Polisario is considered a direct participant in the conflict and as the legitimate representative of the Sahrawi people, recognized by the United Nations since 1979.

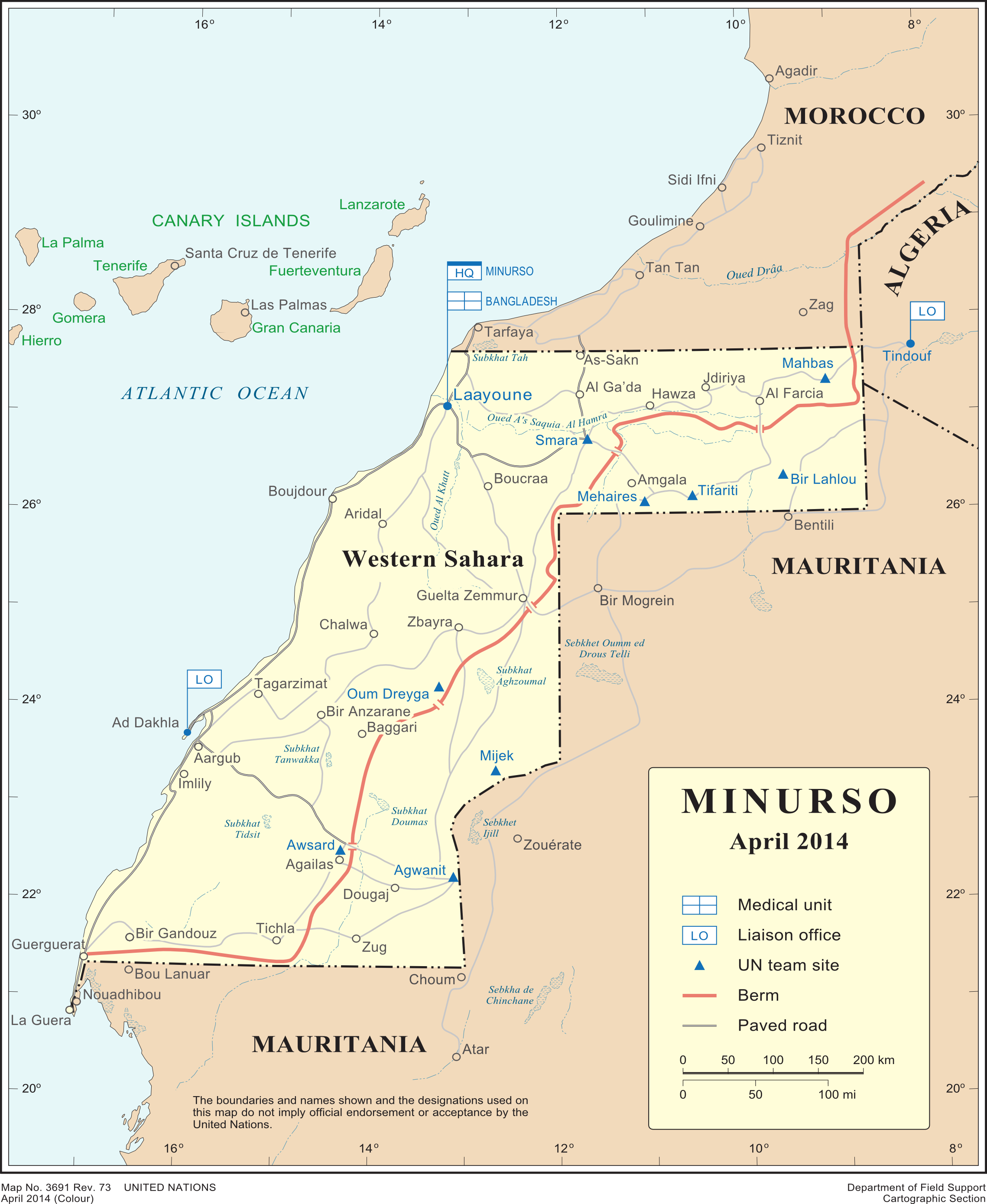
Polisario-held territory east of the Moroccan Wall (red)

The Polisario Front argues that Morocco's position is due to economic interests (fishing, phosphate mining, and the potential for oil reserves) and political reasons (stability of the king's position and the governing elite in Morocco, deployment of most of the Moroccan Army in Western Sahara instead of in Morocco). The Polisario Front proclaimed the Sahrawi Arab Democratic Republic in Bir Lehlou (Western Sahara), on 27 February 1976.

=== Mauritania ===
Claims on Western Sahara had proliferated since the 1960s, fueled by Mauritanian President Moktar Ould Daddah. Before Mauritania signed the Madrid Accords and after the withdrawal of the last Spanish forces, in late 1975, the Mauritanian Army invaded the southern part of Western Sahara, while the Moroccan Army did the same in the north.

In April 1976, Mauritania and Morocco partitioned the country into three parts, Mauritania getting the southern one, which was named Tiris al-Gharbiyya. Mauritania waged four years of war against Polisario guerrillas, conducting raids on Nouakchott, attacks on the Zouerate mine train and a coup d'état that deposed Ould Daddah. Mauritania finally withdrew in the summer of 1979, after signing the Algiers Agreement with the Polisario Front, recognizing the right of self-determination for the Sahrawi people, and renouncing any claims on Western Sahara. The Moroccan Army immediately took control of the former Mauritanian territory.

Mauritania recognized the Sahrawi Arab Democratic Republic on 27 February 1984.

=== Algeria ===
Algeria has supported the independence of the whole of Western Sahara since 1975, when Spanish forces and settlers withdrew from the area. It is one of the few countries to do so in the Arab League. It has provided aid to the 'Polisario Front'. Algeria's role became indirect, through political and military support for the Polisario Front. Algeria recognized the Sahrawi Arab Democratic Republic on 6 March 1976. Its involvement in Western Sahara independence movement has interrupted the development of Algerian-Morocco diplomatic relations, which were restored in 1988.

=== United Nations ===
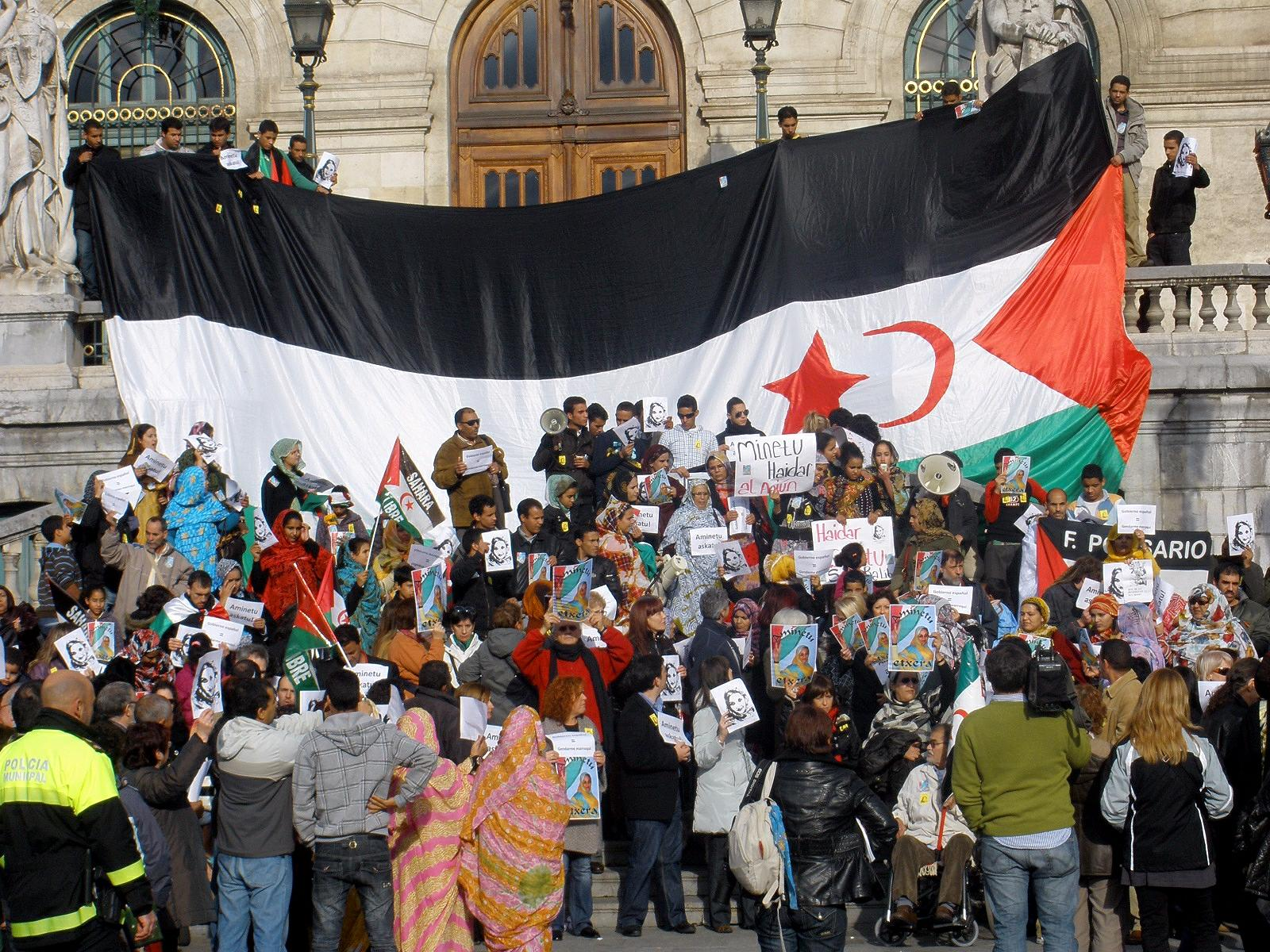
A demonstration in Bilbao for the independence of Western Sahara.

Western Sahara is on the United Nations list of non-self-governing territories. The UN has been involved since 1988 in trying to find a solution to the conflict through self-determination. In 1988, the Kingdom of Morocco and the Polisario Front agreed to settle the dispute through a referendum under the auspices of the UN that would allow the people of Western Sahara to choose between independence or integration with Morocco. In 1991, the parties agreed upon the Settlement Plan, contingent on the referendum being held the following year, but due to disputes over voter qualification, the vote was not held. In the following years, the UN argued for negotiations between Morocco and the Polisario Front to resolve the deadlock, culminating in the Manhasset negotiations in 2007–2008.

As of 2020, the mandate for MINURSO has been extended 47 times and it maintains its presence in the country, but has yet to fulfill its mission by organizing a referendum.

== Positions of other states ==
Some states are supportive of the "right of self-determination of the Sahrawi people", including the option of autonomy under Moroccan sovereignty. Some states have changed their opinion frequently or have given separate announcements of support for both Morocco and the Polisario Front/SADR (Egypt, Italy, Lesotho, Russia, Rwanda, Yemen, etc.).

Some of the states announcing support of the "right of self-determination" currently recognize the Sahrawi Arab Democratic Republic. Not all of the states that have terminated diplomatic relations with or withdrawn recognition of the SADR have announced their support for the Moroccan claims.

The majority of United Nations member states have not announced any position.

=== States supporting Polisario and the SADR on Western Sahara ===
#	State	Notes	International membership	References
1	Algeria		African Union member Arab League member	
2	Angola		African Union member	
3	Belize			
4	Botswana		African Union member	
5	Cambodia		ASEAN member	
6	Cuba			
7	Ethiopia		African Union member	
8	Iran			
9	Laos		ASEAN member	
10	Lesotho		African Union member	
11	Libya		African Union member Arab League member	
12	Mauritania		African Union member Arab League member	
13	Mauritius	Supports Morocco's autonomy proposal	African Union member	
14	Mexico			
15	Mozambique		African Union member	
16	Namibia		African Union member	
17	Nicaragua			
18	Nigeria		African Union member	
19	North Korea			
20	Rwanda		African Union member	
21	South Africa		African Union member	
—	South Ossetia	Partially recognized state (4 UN members)		
22	South Sudan		African Union member	
23	Syria	The new transitional government of Syria expelled the diplomatic corpus of the SADR from Damascus in 2024. Meanwhile, it supported Morocco`s autonomy proposal.	Arab League member	
24	Tanzania		African Union member	
25	Timor-Leste			
26	Trinidad and Tobago			
27	Uganda		African Union member	
28	Uruguay			
29	Vanuatu			
30	Venezuela			
31	Vietnam		ASEAN member	
32	Zimbabwe		African Union member	

=== States supporting Morocco's autonomy proposal ===
States that have recognised Western Sahara as part of the Kingdom of Morocco through official announcement.
States that have withdrawn, frozen or suspended their recognition of the SADR.

#	State	Notes (Note: Major regional organization members.)	Diplomatic mission (Note: The dates when countries had consulates in either Dakhla or Laayoune, Western Sahara.)	References
1	Antigua and Barbuda			
2	Azerbaijan			
3	Bahrain	Arab League member	14 December 2020	
4	Belgium	(European Union) EU member	23 October 2025	
5	Bolivia		24 February 2026	
6	Burkina Faso	African Union member	23 October 2020	
7	Burundi	African Union member	28 February 2020	
8	Cape Verde	African Union member		
9	Central African Republic	African Union member	23 January 2020	
9	Chile			
10	Colombia			
11	Comoros	African Union member Arab League member	18 December 2019	
12	Democratic Republic of the Congo	African Union member	19 December 2020	
13	Djibouti	African Union member Arab League member	28 February 2020	
14	Dominica			
15	Equatorial Guinea	African Union member	23 October 2020	
16	Eswatini	African Union member	27 October 2020	
17	Finland	(European Union) EU member		
18	France	(European Union) EU member		
19	Gabon	African Union member	17 January 2020	
20	Gambia	African Union member	7 January 2020	
21	Ghana	African Union member		
22	Grenada			
23	Guatemala			
24	Guinea	African Union member	17 January 2020	
25	Guinea-Bissau	African Union member	23 October 2020	
26	Haiti		12 December 2020	
27	Hungary	(European Union) EU member		
28	Israel			
29	Ivory Coast	African Union member	18 February 2020	
30	Jordan	Arab League member	4 March 2021	
31	Kenya	African Union member		
32	Kiribati			
33	Kuwait	Arab League member		
34	Liberia	African Union member	12 March 2020	
35	Malawi	African Union member	29 July 2021	
36	Maldives			
37	Mali	African Union member		
38	Netherlands	(European Union) EU member		
39	Oman	Arab League member		
40	Panama			
41	Papua New Guinea			
42	Paraguay			
43	Peru			
44	Qatar	Arab League member		
45	Romania	(European Union) EU member		
46	Saint Lucia			
47	São Tomé and Príncipe	African Union member	23 January 2020	
48	Saudi Arabia	Arab League member		
49	Senegal	African Union member	5 April 2021	
50	Serbia			
51	Sierra Leone	African Union member	1 September 2021	
52	Somalia	African Union member Arab League member		
53	Spain	(European Union) EU member		
54	Suriname		30 May 2022	
55	Togo	African Union member	9 June 2022	
56	United Arab Emirates	Arab League member	4 November 2020	
57	United Kingdom			
58	United States			
59	Zambia	African Union member	27 October 2020	

=== Position of United Nations Security Council permanent members ===
France

France claims neutrality on the Western Sahara issue, despite its military involvement in the Western Sahara War on the side of Morocco and Mauritania (see Operation Lamantin). In 2009 and 2010, France used the threat of its veto power to block the establishment of Human Rights monitoring by the MINURSO in Western Sahara. France has been a major backer of the Moroccan autonomy proposal and in the EU negotiated the concession of the advanced status to Morocco.

On 30 July 2024, coinciding with the 25th anniversary of Throne Day (Morocco), French President Emmanuel Macron sent a letter to King Mohammed VI of Morocco clarifying France's new position on the Western Sahara. He stated that he "considers that the present and future of Western Sahara lie within the framework of Moroccan sovereignty..." He further affirmed France's support for Morocco's autonomy plan stating, "our support for the autonomy plan proposed by Morocco in 2007 is clear and unwavering," adding that the plan "constitutes now the only basis to achieve a just, lasting, and negotiated political solution, in accordance with United Nations Security Council resolutions."

This speech marked a notable change of French diplomatic stance towards the Sahara issue. Previously, France argued that Morocco’s plan for autonomy was a “serious and credible” basis for discussion, but not the only one on the table -- acknowledging the equally valued Baker I and Baker II plans, and the 2007 Polisario Counter-Proposal. Now, however, President Macron stresses Morocco's 2007 Plan as the 'best' one moving forward.

Macron emphasized France's support for Morocco's efforts to promote economic and social development in the region. From 28 to 30 October 2024, Macron conducted his three-day state visit to Morocco's capital accompanied by a delegation of French ministers and business leaders. Notable cabinet members present included French Interior Minister Bruno Retailleau, Economy Minister Antoine Armand and Culture Minister Rachida Dati – herself of Moroccan origin. On the first day, the King and Macron jointly chaired the signing ceremony of 22 key deals between the nations, addressing: railway, aviation, education, and sustainable energy/infrastructure.

On 29 October 2024, in an address to the Moroccan Parliament, Macron said French companies "will support the development" of the Sahara, pledging "investments and sustainable support initiatives to benefit local populations." This includes French-sponsored projects and initiatives in Dakhla, Western Sahara and the Guelmim-Oued Noun region—more broadly—amounting to 10 billion euros ($10.8 billion). As part of the objective "to accelerate" partnerships between France and Morocco, MGH Energy, a French company focused on decarbonizing transportation by air and sea, also plans to partner with a Moroccan gas retailer to produce fuel near Dakhla. In an effort to begin its first phase of operations by 2030, the company said it planned to invest 4.8 billion euros ($5.2 billion). 2030 also aligns with when Morocco hopes its Atlantic Ocean port under construction in Dakhla will open, stimulating an unprecedented flow of exports from Morocco and its neighbors in West Africa.

United States

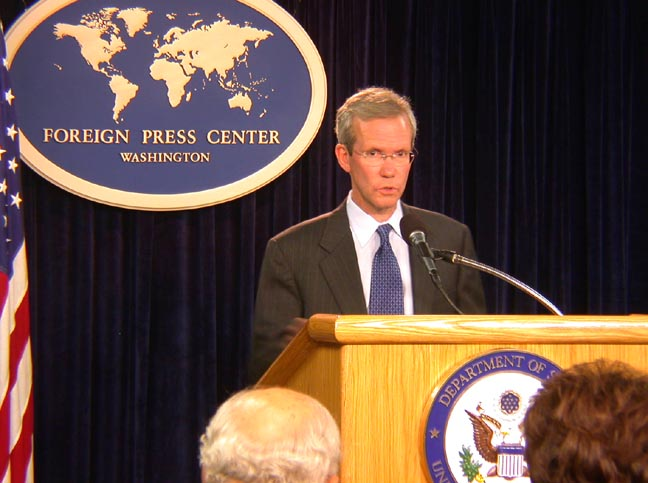
Photo of Former Assistant Secretary of State, David Welch (2005–2008) who in 2007 expressed strong support for Morocco and its autonomy plan in the conflict over Western Sahara, calling the plan a "serious and credible" solution.

The Obama administration disassociated itself from the Moroccan autonomy plan in 2009, however, reversing the Bush-backed support of the Moroccan plan, and returning to a pre-Bush position, wherein the option of an independent Western Sahara is on the table again.

In April 2009, 229 members of the U.S. House of Representatives, a clear majority and more than 50 more than the number who signed the letter in 2007, called on President Obama to support Morocco's autonomy plan and to assist in drawing the conflict to a close. The signers included Democratic Majority Leader Steny Hoyer and Republican Minority Leader John Boehner. In addition to acknowledging that Western Sahara has become a recruiting post for radical Islamists, the letter affirmed that the conflict is "the single greatest obstacle impending the security and cooperation necessary to combat" terrorism in the Maghreb. The letter referenced UN Security Council Resolution 1813 (2008), and encouraged President Obama to follow the policy set by President Clinton and followed by President Bush. The congressmen expressed concerns about Western Sahara's viability. They referenced a UN fact-finding mission to Western Sahara which confirmed the State Department's view that the Polisario proposal, which ultimately stands for independence, would lead to a non-viable state. In closing, the letter stated, "We remain convinced that the U.S. position, favoring autonomy for Western Sahara under Moroccan sovereignty is the only feasible solution. We urge you to both sustain this longstanding policy, and to make clear, in both words and actions, that the United States will work to ensure that the UN process continues to support this framework as the only realistic compromise that can bring this unfortunate and longstanding conflict to an end."

Commenting on a 2004 free trade agreement with Morocco, US Trade Representative Robert Zoellick stated in a letter to Congressman Joe Pitts in response to his questioning, "the United States and many other countries do not recognize Moroccan sovereignty over Western Sahara and have consistently urged the parties to work with the United Nations to resolve the conflict by peaceful means. The Free Trade Agreement will not include Western Sahara."

In April 2013, the United States proposed that MINURSO monitored human rights (as all the other UN mission since 1991) in Western Sahara, a move that Morocco strongly opposed, cancelling the annual African Lion military exercises with U.S. Army troops. Also in mid-April, United States Ambassador to Morocco Samuel L. Kaplan declared during a conference in Casablanca that the Moroccan autonomy plan "can't be the only basis in these negotiations", referring to the UN sponsored talks between the Polisario Front and Morocco.

On 10 December 2020, President Donald Trump announced that the United States would officially recognize Morocco's claims over Western Sahara, as a result of Morocco agreeing to normalize relations with Israel. In April 2021, the Biden administration stated that they would not reverse the decision. In November 2021, Antony Blinken said that the Biden administration "[continues] to view Morocco’s autonomy plan as serious, credible, and realistic, and one potential approach to satisfy the aspirations of the people of Western Sahara".

In October 2025, Steve Witkoff told CBS's 60 Minutes that the United States was working on Algeria and Morocco and predicted a peace deal within 60 days, while Jared Kushner, interviewed alongside him, said that mere miscommunication often stalls diplomatic efforts, and that there was hope for Moroccan-Algerian normalization. Algerian Foreign Minister Ahmed Attaf later, however, denied that any negotiations were underway, saying bilateral dialogue with Morocco was not on the agenda. In July 2026, Morocco named the Tiznit–Dakhla Expressway the "Donald J. Trump Highway." The roughly 655-mile (1,055 km), $1 billion road runs through Guelmim, Tan-Tan, and Laâyoune into the Western Sahara. In a message dated 2 July 2026, King Mohammed VI cited Trump's 2020 recognition as the reason for the naming, and Trump thanked him on Truth Social on 26 July 2026. The highway has been described as a key component of the king's plans to assert control over the region, with its naming underscoring the US President's support for Morocco.

United Kingdom

In 2007, it was noted that the UK Foreign and Commonwealth Office (FCO) treated the status of Western Sahara as 'undetermined', and that its lack of reference to the partition and the existence of the Polisario-held areas suggested a tacit acceptance of Morocco as the administering power in the entire territory.

On 1 June 2025, during a joint press conference in Rabat, UK Foreign Secretary David Lammy stated that the United Kingdom would change its position to support Morocco's plan of limited autonomy for Western Sahara, calling it "the most credible, viable and pragmatic" solution to the conflict.

=== States which have not announced any position ===
The following states and entities have not announced any position:

- Americas: Argentina, Bahamas
- Africa: Eritrea, Tunisia
- Europe: Andorra, Armenia, Bulgaria, Belarus, Czech Republic, Estonia, Georgia, Latvia, Liechtenstein, Lithuania, Luxembourg, Malta, Monaco, Moldova, Montenegro, San Marino, Switzerland, Vatican City
- Asia: Bangladesh, Bhutan, Brunei, People's Republic of China (UNSC-P5), Indonesia, Japan, Kazakhstan, Kyrgyzstan, Malaysia, Mongolia, Myanmar, Nepal, Pakistan, Palestine, Philippines, Singapore, Tajikistan, Thailand, Turkey, Turkmenistan, Uzbekistan
- Oceania: Australia, Marshall Islands, Micronesia, New Zealand, Niue, Palau, Samoa, Tonga
- Others: Abkhazia, Republic of China (Taiwan), Kosovo, Somaliland, Transnistria
- Sovereign Military Order of Malta

== Positions of international organizations ==
Organization	Membership	Position
African Union (Formerly OAU)	22 February 1982	The Sahrawi Arab Democratic Republic is a fully recognized AU founding member. The African Union supports the right of self-determination of the Sahrawi people.
Andean Community of Nations	26 October 2011 (Observer)	The Sahrawi Arab Democratic Republic is an Observer member in the framework of the Andean Parliament.
Arab League	Not a member.	The Arab League supports "the integrity of the Moroccan territorial sovereignty" without specifying a position on a solution to the conflict.
Arab Maghreb Union	Not a member.	The Arab Maghreb Union has not made a unanimous statement about its position on the conflict between Morocco and the Polisario Front.
Caribbean Community (CARICOM)	Not a member.	The CARICOM supports the right of the Western Sahara people's to self-determination, consistent with the principles and purposes of the Charter of the United Nations.
Community of Latin American and Caribbean States	Not a member.	The CELAC supports efforts by all parties to achieve a just, lasting and mutually acceptable political solution that would provide for the right of self-determination for the inhabitants.
European Union	Not a member.	The EU supports the efforts by the Secretary General of the United Nations and his Personal Envoy to find a just, lasting and mutually acceptable political solution which will allow the self-determination of the people of Western Sahara as provided for in the resolutions of the United Nations.
Non-Aligned Movement	Not a member.	The NAM supports the right of the Western Sahara people's to self-determination, consistent with the principles and purposes of the Charter of the United Nations and General Assembly resolution 1514 (XV) of 14 December 1960.
Organisation of Islamic Cooperation	Not a member.	The OIC supports the achievement of a just, lasting and mutually acceptable political solution that would provide for the self-determination of the people of Western Sahara consistent with relevant resolutions.
Rio Group	Not a member.	The Rio Group supports the resolutions adopted by the UN to achieve a just, lasting and mutually acceptable solution that leads to the self-determination of the people of Western Sahara, in the context of compatible accords with the principles of the UN charter and the Resolution 1514 (XV) of the General Assembly and other pertinent resolutions.
Union of South American Nations	Not a member.	The UNASUR supports for the achievement of a just, lasting and mutually acceptable political solution that would provide for the self-determination of the people of Western Sahara consistent with relevant resolutions.
United Nations	Not a member.	The UN does not recognize Moroccan claims, as Western Sahara remains in its list of non-self-governing territories since 1963. It has approved more than 100 resolutions supporting the right of self-determination of the Sahrawi people. The Security Council has argued for direct negotiations between Morocco and the Polisario Front.

The SADR is also a member of the Asian-African Strategic Partnership, formed at the 2005 Asian-African Conference, over Moroccan objections to SADR participation.

In 2006, the SADR participated in a conference of the Permanent Conference of Political Parties of the Latin American and the Caribbean.

African Union

On 22 February 1982, the SADR secured membership in the Organisation of African Unity.

In 1984, Morocco withdrew from the AU's predecessor, the Organization of African Unity (OAU), in protest of the group's recognition of the Sahrawi Arab Democratic Republic (SADR).

The African Union (formerly the OAU) has given the Sahrawi Arab Democratic Republic full recognition, and accepted it as a member state (which has led Morocco to leave the union). Mohamed Abdelaziz, president of the SADR, has been Vice-president of the OUA in 1985, and of the AU in 2002.

In 2016, King Mohammed VI of Morocco declared his country's intention to become a member of the African Union. On the same day, twenty-eight African countries or about 52% of the 54 UN recognized member states of the African Union signed a petition to expel the Sahrawi Arab Democratic Republic from the African Union. At the same time, AU Commission Chairwoman Nkosazana Dlamini-Zuma reaffirmed the AU's support for Western Sahara's independence.

European Union

The European Union supports the right of self-determination of the Sahrawi people (the MINURSO UN-sponsored referendum), but does not recognize the Polisario Front. Over practical issues such as fishing in the EEZ the EU deals with Morocco as the country currently exercising "jurisdiction, but not sovereignty" over Western Sahara territory. In addition, members of the EFTA trade bloc have made statements excluding Western Sahara from the Moroccan-EFTA free trade agreement. In December 2016, the European Court of Justice reaffirmed in Council v Front populaire pour la libération de la saguia-el-hamra et du rio de oro (Front Polisario) that Morocco has no basis for sovereignty over Western Sahara and that trade deals with Morocco cannot apply to the occupied territory.

United Nations

Since 1966, the United Nations request for the celebration of a referendum for enabling the "indigenous population" to exercise freely their right to self-determination. Since 1979, the United Nations has recognized the Polisario Front as the representative of the people of Western Sahara, and considered Morocco as an occupying force.

Former United Nations Secretary-General Kofi Annan stressed, in his last report on Western Sahara, to the Security Council:

"The Security Council would not be able to invite parties to negotiate about Western Saharan autonomy under Moroccan sovereignty, for such wording would imply recognition of Moroccan sovereignty over Western Sahara, which was out of the question as long as no States Member of the United Nations had recognized that sovereignty".

== See also ==
- Foreign relations of Morocco
- Foreign relations of the Sahrawi Arab Democratic Republic
- List of states with limited recognition
- Polisario Front
