= United Nations Mission for the Referendum in Western Sahara =

United Nations peacekeeping mission in Western Sahara

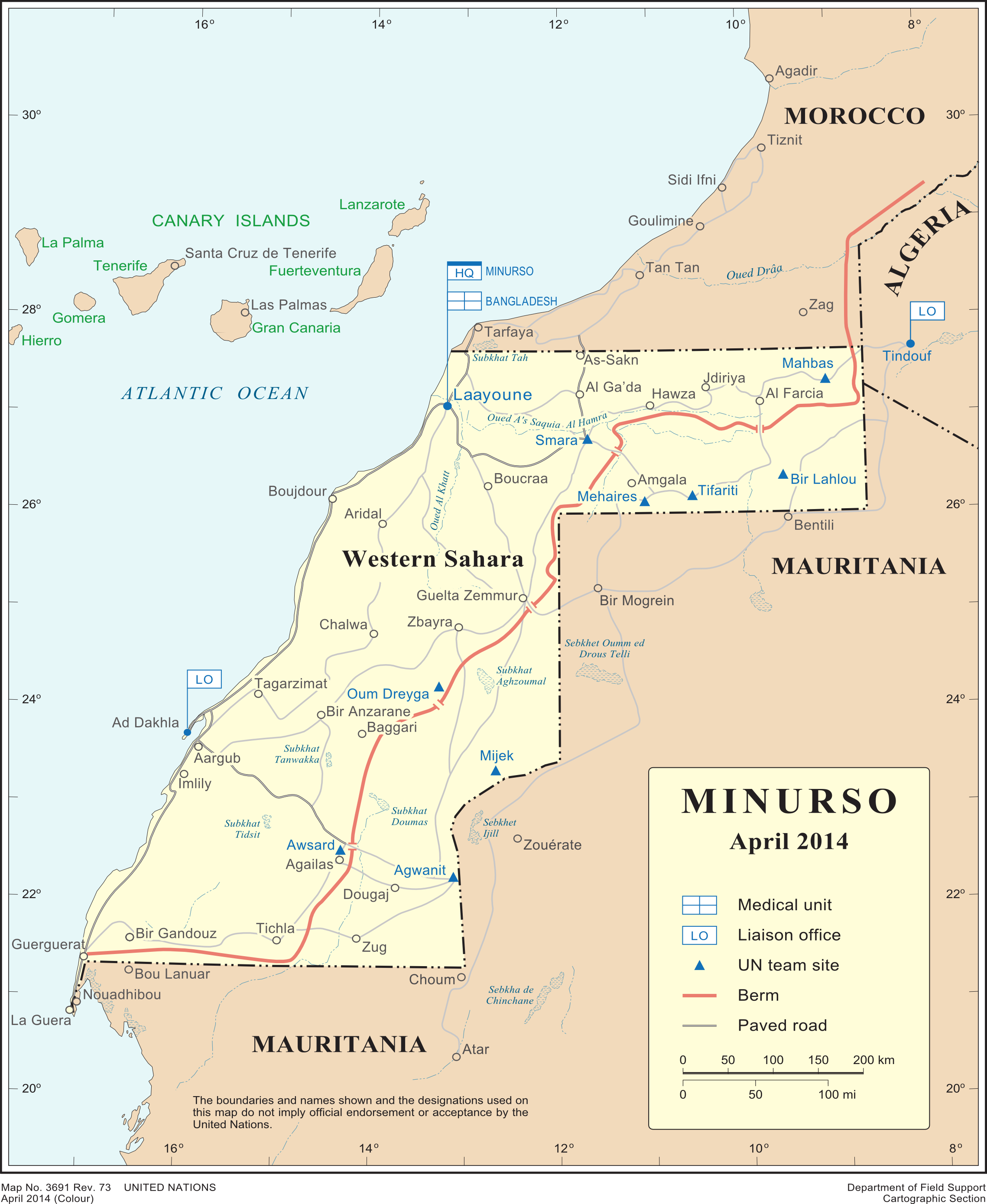
- Location of Western Sahara in North Africa
- Abbreviation: MINURSO
- Formation: 24 April 1991
- Dissolved: 1 November 2026
- Type: Peacekeeping Mission
- Legal status: Inactive (since 31 October 2026)
- Headquarters: Laayoune
- Parent organization: United Nations Security Council
- Website: minurso.unmissions.org

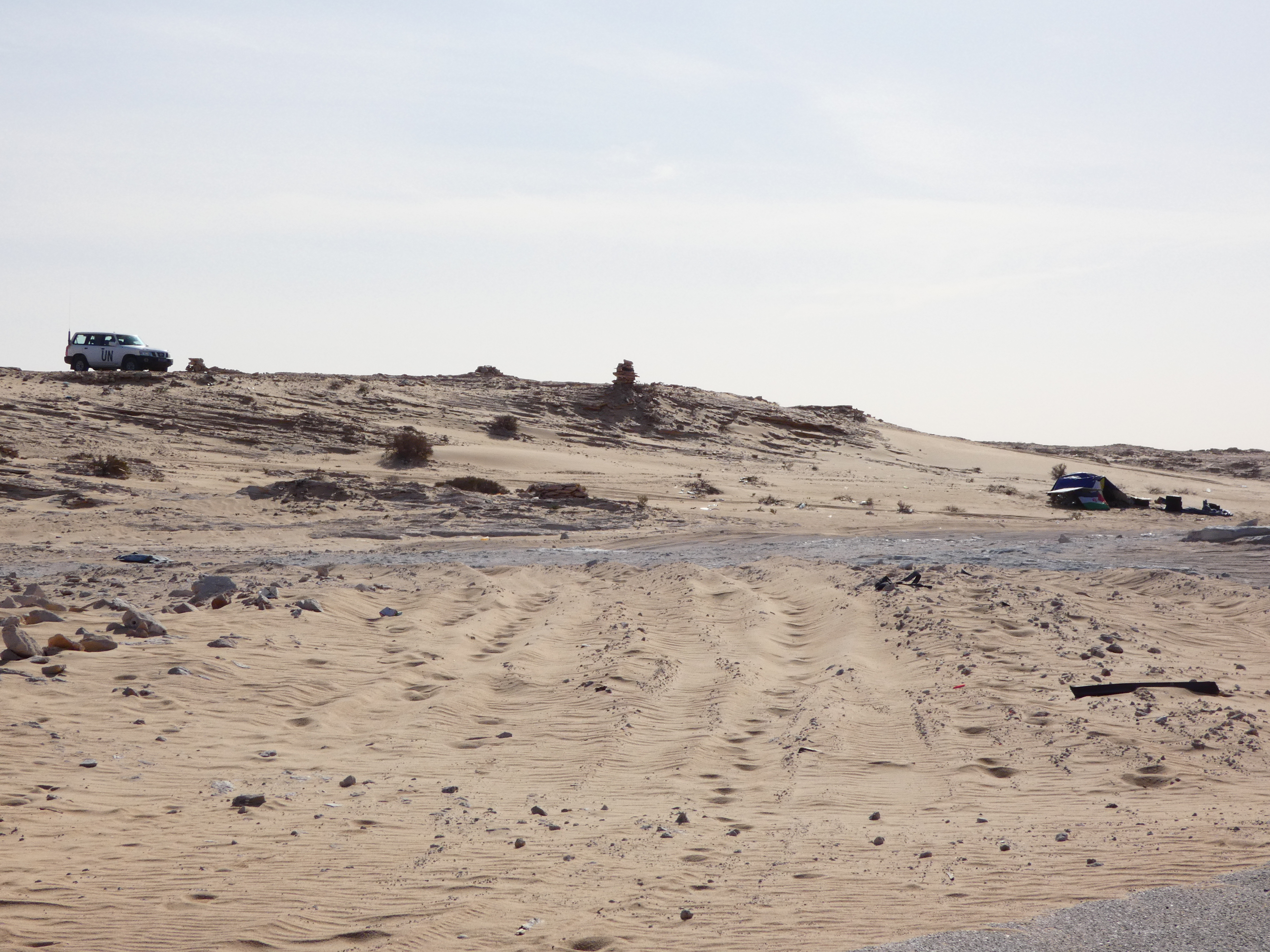
Left a car of MINURSO, right a post of the Frente polisario in 2017 in southern Western Sahara

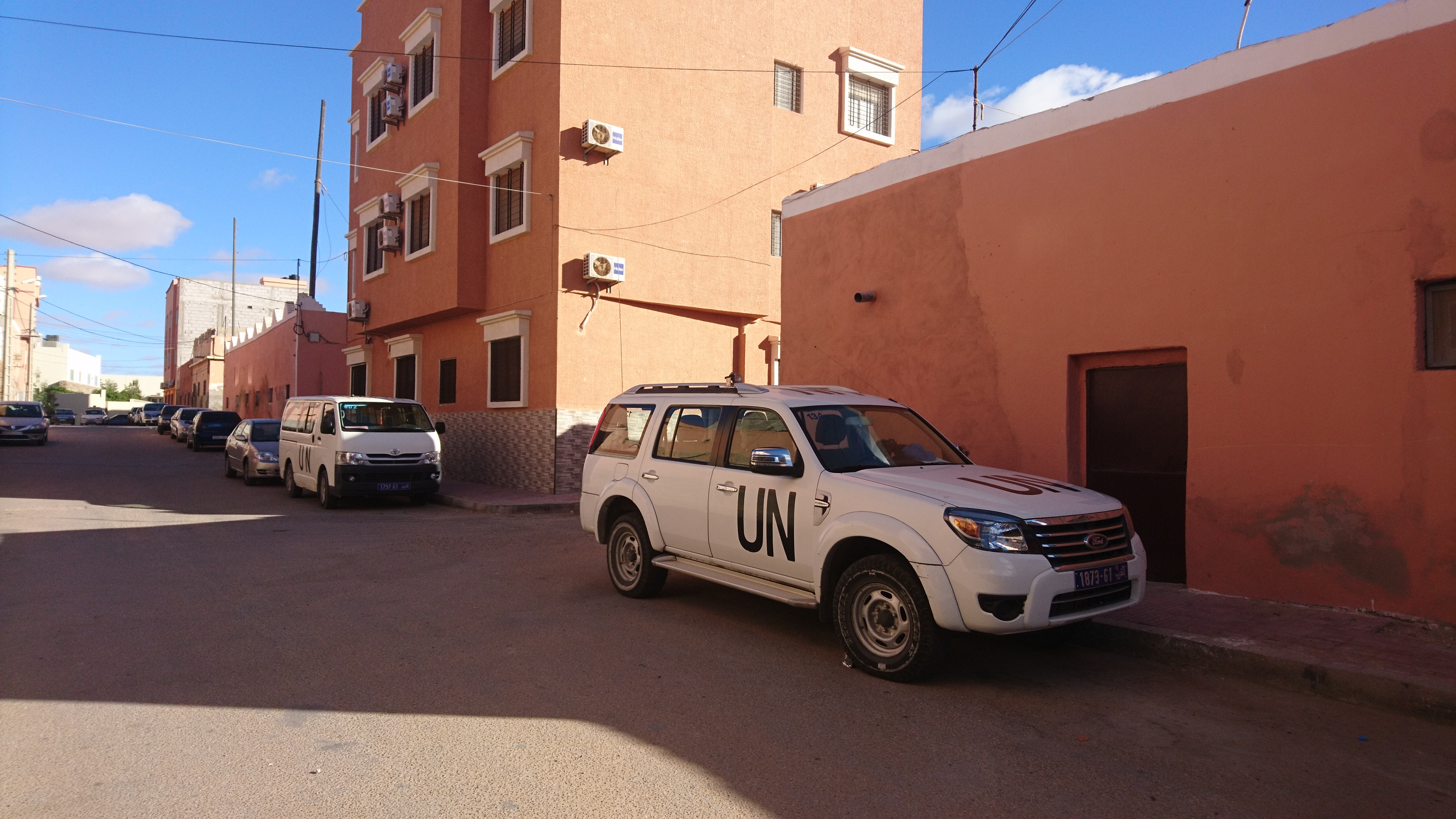
MINURSO cars in Laayoune.

The United Nations Mission for the Referendum in Western Sahara (Arabic: بعثة الأمم المتحدة لتنظيم استفتاء في الصحراء الغربية; French: Mission des Nations Unies pour l'Organisation d'un Référendum au Sahara Occidental; Spanish: Misión de las Naciones Unidas para la Organización de un Referéndum en el Sáhara Occidental; MINURSO) was a United Nations peacekeeping mission in Western Sahara, established in 1991 under United Nations Security Council Resolution 690 as part of the Settlement Plan, which had paved way for a cease-fire in the conflict between Morocco and the Polisario Front (representing the Sahrawi Arab Democratic Republic) over the contested territory of Western Sahara (formerly Spanish Sahara).

MINURSO's mission was to monitor the cease-fire and to organize and conduct a referendum in accordance with the Settlement Plan, which would enable the Sahrawi people of Western Sahara to choose between integration with Morocco and independence. This was intended to constitute a Sahrawi exercise of self-determination, and thus complete Western Sahara's still-unfinished process of decolonization (Western Sahara is the last major territory remaining on the UN's list of non-decolonized territories.)

MINURSO ceased operations on 1 November 2026, following the Security Council's failure to agree a mandate extension.

== Mandate ==
According to the United Nations, MINURSO was "originally mandated in accordance with the settlement plan to:

- monitor the ceasefire;
- verify the reduction of Moroccan troops in the Territory;
- monitor the confinement of Moroccan and Frente Polisario troops to designated locations;
- take steps with the parties to ensure the release of all Western Saharan political prisoners or detainees;
- oversee the exchange of prisoners of war, to be implemented by International Committee of the Red Cross, (ICRC);
- repatriate the refugees of Western Sahara, a task to be carried out by the United Nations High Commissioner for Refugees (UNHCR);
- identify and register qualified voters;
- organise and ensure a free and fair referendum and proclaim the results;
- reduce the threat of unexploded ordnances and mines."

== Plans ==
The independence referendum was originally scheduled for 1992, but conflicts over voter eligibility prevented it from being held. Both sides blamed each other for stalling the process. In 1997, the Houston Agreement was supposed to restart the process, but again failed. In 2003, the Baker Plan was launched to replace the Settlement Plan, but while accepted by the Polisario and unanimously endorsed by the United Nations Security Council, it was rejected by Morocco. Morocco insisted that all inhabitants of the territory should be eligible to vote in the referendum. Following the 1975 Green March, the Moroccan state has sponsored settlement schemes enticing thousands of Moroccans to move into the Moroccan-occupied part of Western Sahara (80% of the territory). By 2015, it was estimated that Moroccan settlers made up at least two thirds of the 500,000 inhabitants.

Presently, there is no plan for holding the referendum, and the viability of the cease-fire is coming into question.

== Extensions ==
The MINURSO mandate has been extended 47 times since 1991. In October 2006 the Security Council passed a resolution extending the mandate of MINURSO to April 2007. A provision decrying human rights abuses by Morocco in Western Sahara had the backing of 14 members of the Security Council, but was deleted due to French objections.

In April 2007 the resolution extending the mandate to October took "note of the Moroccan proposal presented on 11 April 2007 to the Secretary-General and welcoming serious and credible Moroccan efforts to move the process forward towards resolution" and also took "note of the Polisario Front proposal presented on 10 April 2007 to the Secretary-General". The representative of South Africa took exception to the way that one proposal was held more worthy than the other as well as the lack of participation outside the Group of Friends in the drafting of the resolution.

The October 2007 resolution extending the mandate to April 2008 contained the same preferential wording in its description of the two proposals. The representative of South Africa commented on this again, and regretted the fact that the resolution "considered" rather than "welcomed" the report on the situation by the Secretary-General—"presumably because [it] dared to raise the issue of the human rights violations against the Saharawi people", and quoted the warning in the report about there being no mandate to address the issue of human rights.

The April 2008 resolution extended the mandate for a full year to April 2009. Before the vote, the representative of Costa Rica expressed his "concern at the manner in which the draft resolution on which we are about to vote was negotiated" and a "difficulty in understanding the absolute refusal to include" references to human rights. MINURSO's budget was roughly 60 million dollars per year.

In 2026 the Security Council failed to renew the mission's mandate. King Mohammad VI of Morocco welcomed the mission's end, while UN Secretary-General António Guterres feared that it may lead to hostilities.

== Bases ==
There were two sets of teams, those in the Moroccan-controlled portion west of the berm and those in the Sahrawi-controlled region and refugee camps to the east and in Algeria. The camps west of the berm were located in Mahbes, Smara, Umm Dreiga and Auserd. The eastern camps included Bir Lehlou, Tifariti, Mehaires, Mijek, and Agwanit. There was also a liaison office in Tindouf which serves as a communication channel with POLISARIO leadership.

== Composition ==
As of 30 June 2018, MINURSO had a total of 220 uniformed personnel, including 19 contingent troops, 193 experts on mission, 7 staff officers, and 1 police officer, supported by 227 civilian personnel, and 16 UN volunteers. Major troop contributors are Bangladesh, Egypt, and Pakistan. Armed contingents patrol the no man's land that borders the Moroccan Wall, to safeguard the cease-fire.

- Special Representative of the Secretary-General and Chief of Mission: Alexander Ivanko (Russia)
- Force Commander: Major general Jawwad Ahmed Qazi ( Pakistan)
- Chief of Mission Support: Veneranda Mukandoli-Jefferson (Rwanda)
- Chief of Staff: Nick Birnback (United States)
- Head of Liaison Office, Tindouf: Yusef Jedian (Palestine)

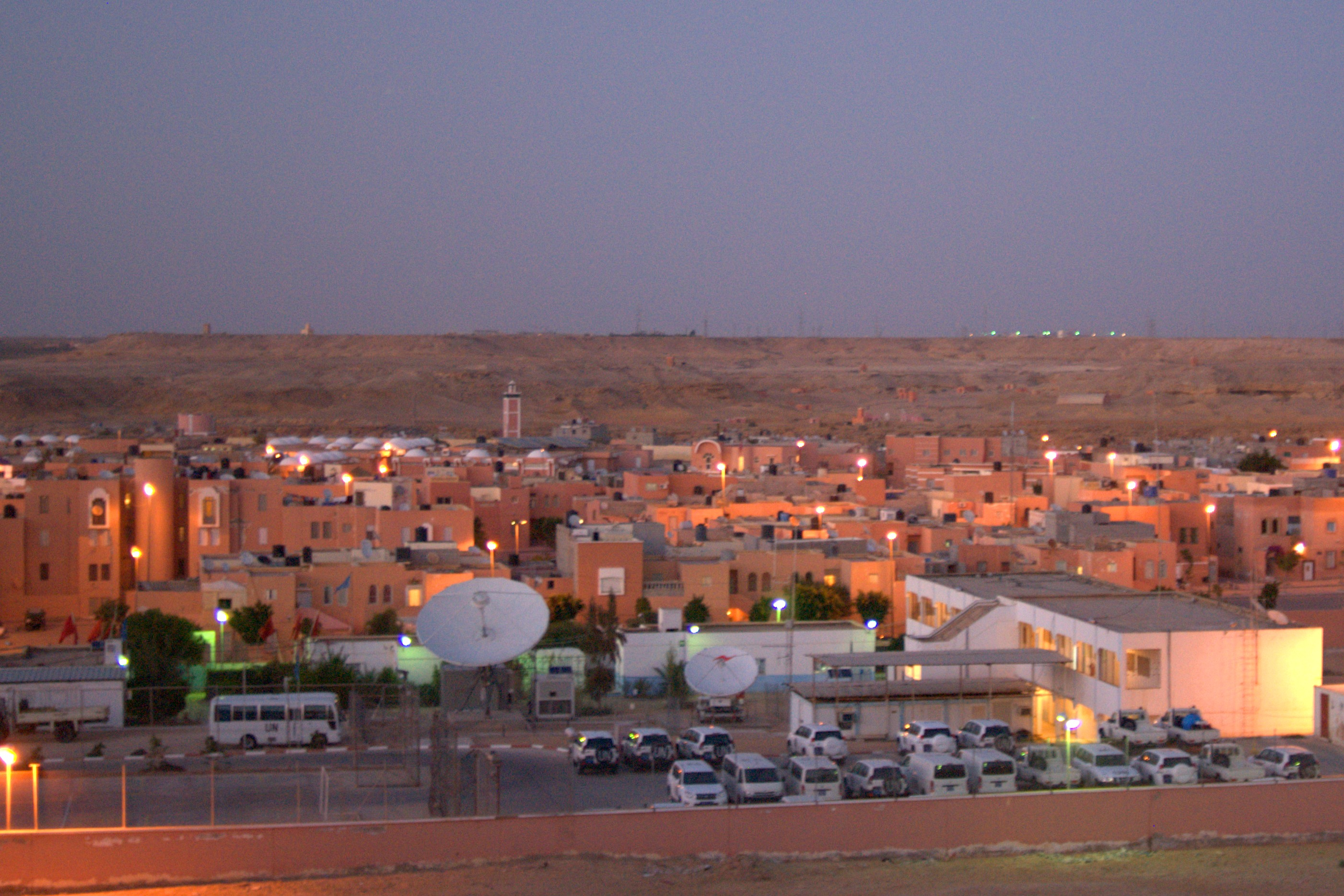
MINURSO headquarters in El Aaiun, Western Sahara, June 2, 2012. Several Moroccan flags are displayed at the entrance of the compound, in contrast with MINURSO bases in the POLISARIO Liberated Territories, where only the UN flag is displayed.

Other personnel:

State	Contingent Troops	Experts on Mission	Staff Officers	Police	Total
Argentina	0	3	0	0	3
Austria	0	5	0	0	5
Bangladesh	19	8	0	0	27
Belgium	0	7	0	0	7
Bhutan	0	2	0	0	2
Brazil	0	10	0	0	10
China	0	12	0	0	12
Croatia	0	7	0	0	7
Djibouti	0	2	0	0	2
Dominican Republic	0	0	0	2	2
Ecuador	0	4	0	0	4
Egypt	0	19	0	0	19
El Salvador	0	1	0	0	1
France	0	2	0	0	2
Germany	0	1	0	0	1
Ghana	0	8	7	0	15
Guinea	0	4	0	0	4
Honduras	0	12	0	0	12
Hungary	0	6	0	0	6
India	0	3	0	0	3
Indonesia	0	3	0	0	3
Ireland	0	3	0	0	3
Italy	0	2	0	0	2
Japan	0	2	0	0	2
Jordan	0	2	0	0	2
Kazakhstan	0	5	0	0	5
Malawi	0	3	0	0	3
Malaysia	0	5	0	0	5
Mexico	0	4	0	0	4
Mongolia	0	1	0	0	1
Nepal	0	6	0	0	6
Nigeria	0	6	0	0	6
Pakistan	0	11	0	0	11
Philippines	0	2	0	2	4
Poland	0	0	1	0	1
Portugal	0	0	0	1	1
Russia	0	15	0	0	15
South Korea	0	4	0	0	4
Sri Lanka	0	4	0	0	4
Sweden	0	2	0	0	2
Switzerland	0	2	0	0	2
Togo	0	2	0	0	2
United Nations	19	200	8	5	232

There have been a total of 16 fatalities in MINURSO: six military personnel, a police officer, a military observer, three international civilian personnel, and five local civilian personnel.

== Criticism ==
MINURSO was the only UN peacekeeping mission established since 1978 to be operating without the capacity to monitor human rights. Although Resolution 1979 of the UN Security Council recommends the establishment of one, this never happened. In 1995, MINURSO's inability or unwillingness to act against perceived Moroccan manipulation of the process, and abuse of Sahrawi civilians, caused its former deputy chairman Frank Ruddy to deliver a strong attack on the organization; he has since kept up his critique of what he argues is an economically costly and politically corrupt process. Criticism was voiced against the UN Security Council for not establishing a program of human rights (as MINURSO is the only UN mission in the world who has no mandate on them) monitoring for Western Sahara and the Sahrawi population, despite serious reports of numerous abuses. This possibility has been denied by France with its veto power on the Security Council. In April 2016, Uruguay and Venezuela expressed their dissatisfaction with this state of affairs by taking the rare step of voting against a Security Council Resolution reauthorizing MINURSO, United Nations Security Council Resolution 2285, from which Russia and two other powers abstained.

Over a two-year period, mostly 2006–07, MINURSO personnel vandalized archaeological sites by spraying graffiti over prehistoric rock paintings and engravings in the Free Zone (POLISARIO-controlled parts of Western Sahara). There are also accusations of looting of prehistorical paintings by individuals from the UN on some of those sites.

In May 2010, the Polisario Front suspended contacts with the MINURSO, because of the failure to implement the self-determination referendum, and accused the force of "...turning into a protector shield of a colonial fact, the occupation of the Western Sahara by Morocco".

== See also ==
- Special Representative of the Secretary-General for Western Sahara
- Foreign relations of the Sahrawi Arab Democratic Republic
- History of Western Sahara
- Politics of Western Sahara
- United Nations Security Council Resolution 1720
- United Nations Security Council Resolution 2285
