= United Nations Security Council Resolution 1349 =

UN Security Council Resolution 1349
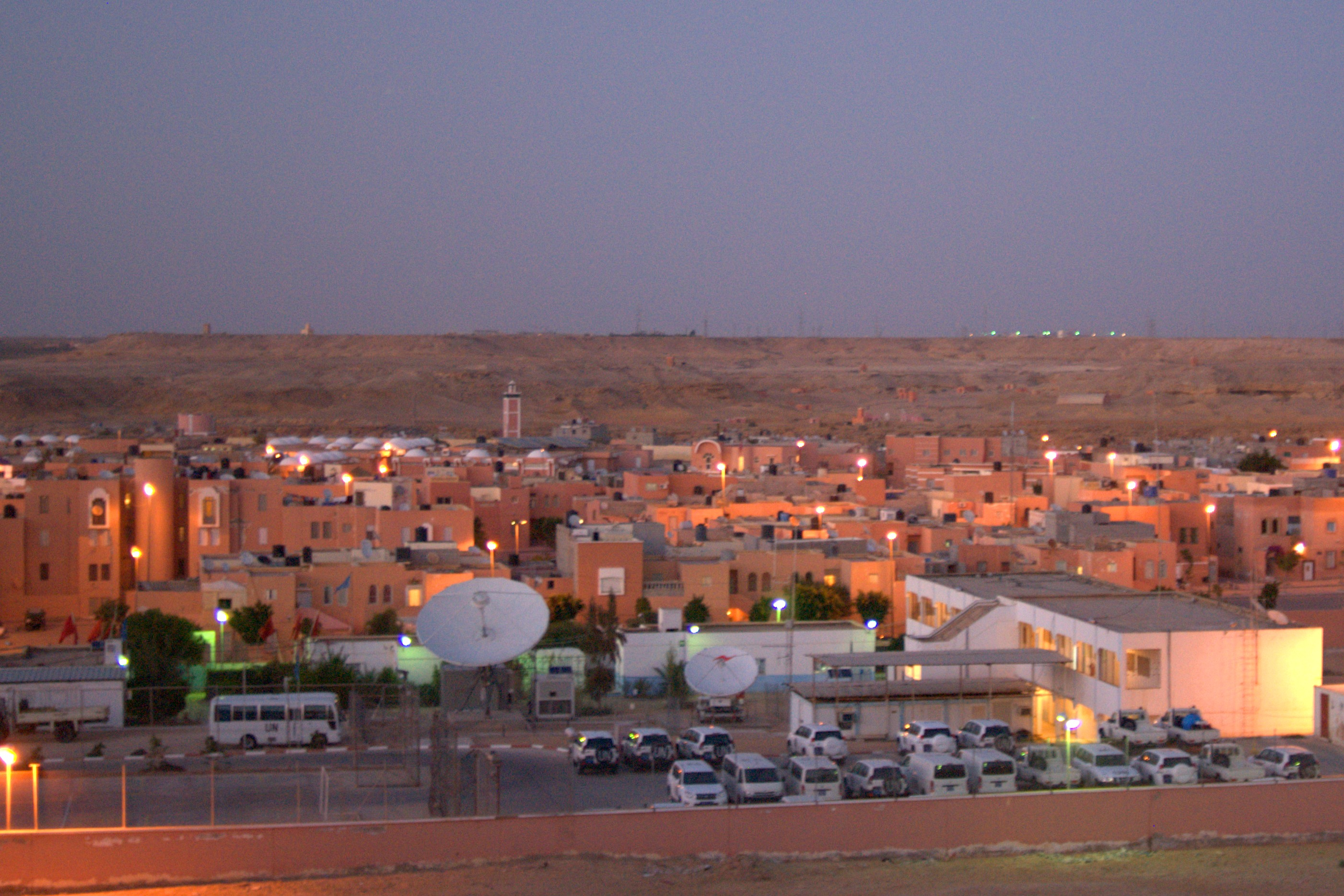
- MINURSO headquarters in 2012
- Date: 27 April 2001
- Meeting no.: 4,315
- Code: S/RES/1349 (Document)
- Subject: The situation concerning Western Sahara
- Voting summary: 15 voted for; None voted against; None abstained
- Result: Adopted

Security Council composition
- Permanent members: China; France; Russia; United Kingdom; United States
- Non-permanent members: Bangladesh; Colombia; Ireland; Jamaica; Mali; Mauritius; Norway; Singapore; Tunisia; Ukraine

United Nations Security Council resolution 1349, adopted unanimously on 27 April 2001, after recalling all previous resolutions on Western Sahara, in particular resolutions 1108 (1997), 1292 (2000), 1301 (2000), 1309 (2000), 1324 (2000) and 1342 (2001), the Council extended the mandate of the United Nations Mission for the Referendum in Western Sahara (MINURSO) until 30 June 2001.

The Security Council reiterated its support for efforts by MINURSO and the United Nations and agreements adopted by Morocco and the Polisario Front to hold a free and fair referendum on self-determination for the people of Western Sahara. As with previous resolutions, the Council noted that fundamental differences remained between the parties on some aspects concerning the implementation of the Settlement Plan.

The mandate of MINURSO was extended on the condition that remaining differences between the parties would be resolved to reach a mutually acceptable solution. At the end of its mandate on 30 June 2001, the Secretary-General Kofi Annan was required to submit a report on the situation.

== See also ==
- Free Zone (region)
- Political status of Western Sahara
- List of United Nations Security Council Resolutions 1301 to 1400 (2000–2002)
- Sahrawi Arab Democratic Republic
- Moroccan Western Sahara Wall
