= United Nations Security Council Resolution 1342 =

UN Security Council Resolution 1342
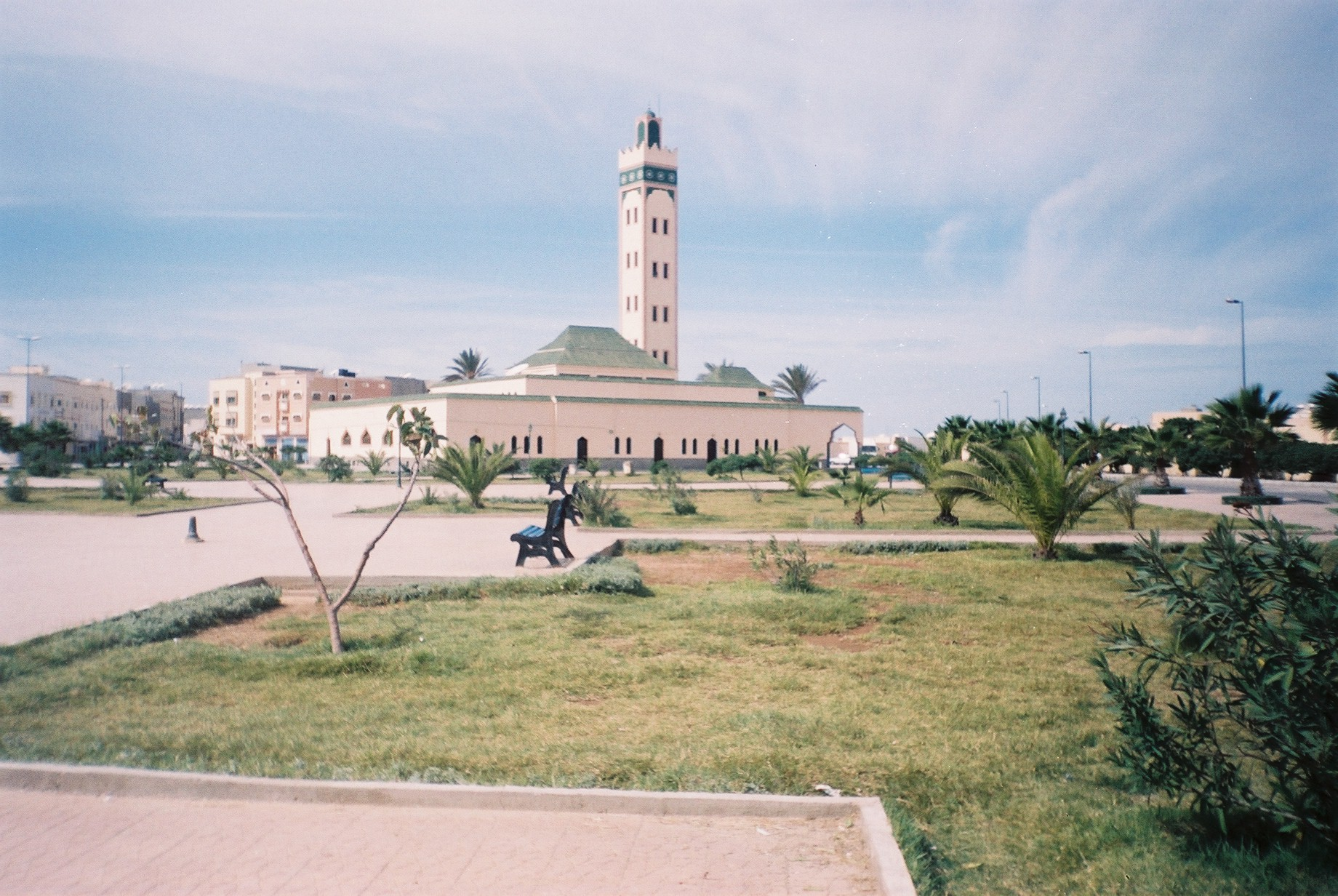
- Dakhla in Western Sahara (photo: Radosław Botev)
- Date: 27 February 2001
- Meeting no.: 4,284
- Code: S/RES/1342 (Document)
- Subject: The situation concerning Western Sahara
- Voting summary: 15 voted for; None voted against; None abstained
- Result: Adopted

Security Council composition
- Permanent members: China; France; Russia; United Kingdom; United States
- Non-permanent members: Bangladesh; Colombia; Ireland; Jamaica; Mali; Mauritius; Norway; Singapore; Tunisia; Ukraine

United Nations Security Council resolution 1342 was adopted unanimously on 27 February 2001. After recalling all previous resolutions on Western Sahara, in particular resolutions 1108 (in 1997), 1292, 1301, 1309 and 1324 (all in 2000), the Council extended the mandate of the United Nations Mission for the Referendum in Western Sahara (MINURSO) until 30 April 2001.

The Security Council reiterated its support for efforts by MINURSO and the United Nations, as well as agreements adopted by Morocco and the Polisario Front, to hold a free and fair referendum on self-determination for the people of Western Sahara. As with previous resolutions, the Council noted that fundamental differences remained between the parties on some aspects concerning the implementation of the Settlement Plan.

The mandate of MINURSO was extended on the condition that remaining differences between the parties would be resolved to reach a mutually acceptable solution. At the end of its mandate on 30 April 2001, the Secretary-General Kofi Annan was required to submit a report on the situation.

== See also ==
- Free Zone (region)
- History of Western Sahara
- Political status of Western Sahara
- List of United Nations Security Council Resolutions 1301 to 1400 (2000–2002)
- Sahrawi Arab Democratic Republic
- Moroccan Western Sahara Wall
