= United Nations Security Council Resolution 1324 =

UN Security Council Resolution 1324
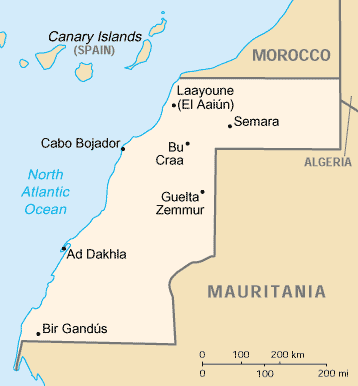
- Western Sahara
- Date: 30 October 2000
- Meeting no.: 4,211
- Code: S/RES/1324 (Document)
- Subject: The situation concerning Western Sahara
- Voting summary: 15 voted for; None voted against; None abstained
- Result: Adopted

Security Council composition
- Permanent members: China; France; Russia; United Kingdom; United States
- Non-permanent members: Argentina; Bangladesh; Canada; Jamaica; Malaysia; Mali; Namibia; Netherlands; Tunisia; Ukraine

United Nations Security Council resolution 1324, adopted unanimously on 30 October 2000, after recalling all previous resolutions on the question of the Western Sahara, in particular resolutions 1108 (1997), 1292 (2000), 1301 (2000), 1308 (2000), and 1309 (2000), the Council extended the mandate of the United Nations Mission for the Referendum in Western Sahara (MINURSO) until 28 February 2001.

The Security Council welcomed the efforts of the Secretary-General's Personal Envoy James Baker and MINURSO to implement the Settlement Plan and agreements adopted by Morocco and the Polisario Front to hold a free and fair referendum on self-determination for the people of Western Sahara. At the same time it noted that fundamental differences between the parties still remained.

The mandate of MINURSO was extended in order to resolve areas of disagreement and find a mutually acceptable solution. The Secretary-General, Kofi Annan was requested to provide an assessment of the situation before the end of MINURSO's mandate on 28 February 2001.

== See also ==
- Free Zone (region)
- History of Western Sahara
- Political status of Western Sahara
- List of United Nations Security Council Resolutions 1301 to 1400 (2000–2002)
- Sahrawi Arab Democratic Republic
- Moroccan Western Sahara Wall
- List of United Nations resolutions concerning Western Sahara
