= Sinking of ROKS Cheonan =

2010 North–South Korea conflict

Coordinates: 37°55′45″N 124°36′02″E

- Part of the Korean conflict
- Four photos show damage to ROKS Cheonan — clockwise from upper left: (1) a damaged stack; (2) front portion (port side) showing the break point; (3) a large fragment is lifted from the sea; (4) water pressure marks on the hull bottom.
Date	26 March 2010
Location	Near Baengnyeong Island, Yellow Sea
Result	Sinking of ROKS Cheonan by North Korean mini-submarine (alleged by South Korea): South Korean-led investigation concluded that Cheonan was sunk by North Korean mini-submarine; North Korea denies involvement

Belligerents
South Korea	North Korea (presumed)

Commanders and leaders
Choi Won-il	Unknown

Units involved
Republic of Korea Navy	Korean People's Navy

Strength
1 Pohang-class corvette	1 Yono-class submarine

Casualties and losses
46 killed 58 wounded ROKS Cheonan sunk	None

Sinking of ROKS Cheonan
- Date: 26 March 2010
- Time: 21:22 Korea Standard Time
- Participants: Republic of Korea Navy (ROK); Korean People's Navy (DPRK)
- Property damage: 1 ROKN corvette sunk, 46 personnel killed, 58 personnel wounded
- Inquiries: International investigation convened by ROK government, Russian Navy investigation
- Charges: ROK-convened (JIG) investigation concludes that DPRK sank the corvette using a midget submarine-launched torpedo. Investigation results are disputed. North Korea denies involvement.

- Sinking of ROKS Cheonan
- Hangul: 천안함 피격 사건
- Hanja: 天安艦被擊事件
- RR: Cheonanham pigyeok sageon
- MR: Ch'ŏnanham p'igyŏk sakŏn

The Sinking of ROKS Cheonan occurred on 26 March 2010, when Cheonan, a Pohang-class corvette of South Korea, carrying 104 personnel, sank off the country's west coast near Baengnyeong Island in the Yellow Sea, killing 46 seamen. The cause of the sinking is disputed.

A South Korean-led official investigation carried out by a team of international experts from South Korea, the United States, the United Kingdom, Canada, Australia, and Sweden presented a summary of its investigation on 20 May 2010, concluding that the warship had been sunk by a North Korean torpedo fired by a midget submarine. The conclusions of the report resulted in significant controversy within South Korea. Following the sinking, South Korea imposed sanctions against North Korea, known as the May 24 measures.

North Korea denied that it was responsible for the sinking. North Korea's further offer to aid an open investigation was disregarded. China dismissed the official scenario presented by South Korea and the United States as lacking in credibility. The results of an investigation by the Russian Navy were not made public. The United Nations Security Council made a Presidential Statement condemning the attack but without identifying the attacker.

== Background ==
The location of the sinking.

Baengnyeong Island is a South Korean island in the Yellow Sea, off the Ongjin peninsula in North Korea. It lies less than 10 miles (16 km) from the North Korean coast, and is over 100 miles (160 km) from the South Korean mainland. The island is to the south and west of the Northern Limit Line, the de facto maritime boundary dividing South Korea (ROK) from North Korea (DPRK).

The area is the site of considerable tension between the two states; although it was provided in the armistice agreement for the stalemate of the Korean War that the islands themselves belonged to the South, the sea boundary was not covered by the armistice, and the sea is claimed by the North.

The situation is further complicated by the presence of a rich fishing ground used by DPRK and Chinese fishing vessels, and there have been numerous clashes over the years between naval vessels from both sides attempting to police what both sides regard as their territorial waters. These have been referred to as "crab wars".

=== History of ship sinkings on both sides ===
In late May 2010, Bruce Cumings, a University of Chicago expert on Korean affairs, commented that the sinking should be regarded as part of long-running tensions in a naval no-man's land. He noted a confrontation in November 2009 in which several North Korean sailors died, and an incident in 1999 when 30 North Koreans were killed and 70 wounded when their ship sank.

In both incidents, the North Koreans were the first to open fire. In the 1999 incident the South Koreans escalated matters by initiating a campaign of boat 'bumping' in order to stop what the South saw as a violation of its maritime borders. Considering these previous incidents, Cumings said that the Cheonan sinking was "ripped out of context, the context of a continuing war that has never ended."

=== Military concerns ===
General Walter L. Sharp, Commander of the South Korea-U.S. Combined Forces Command at the time had, on 24 March, testified before the US House Appropriations Committee, in part, on the need to strengthen the ROK-U.S. alliance, the need for on-site advanced training of the Air Force, the need to improve the quality of life and provide tour normalization for troops serving one-year tours, planned relocation of bases, and the scheduled 2012 transition of Operational Control (OPCON) to ROK. He also warned of the possibility that North Korea could "even launch an attack on the ROK."

== Sinking of Cheonan ==
Thermal image of Cheonan sinking

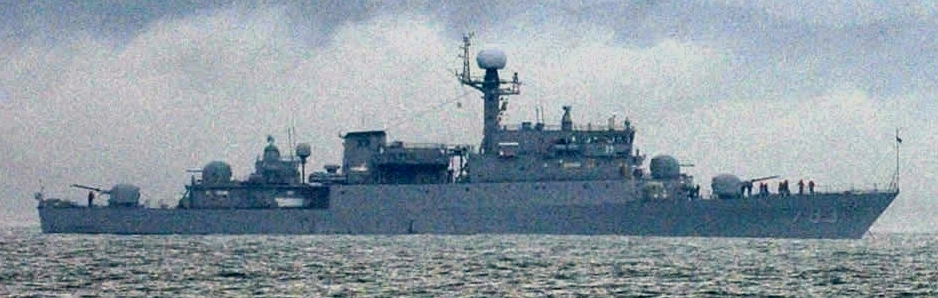
Another Pohang-class corvette, Sinsung

On the night of the sinking, the U.S. and South Korean navies were engaged in joint anti-submarine warfare exercises 75 miles (121 km) away. This was part of the annual Key Resolve/Foal Eagle war exercise, described as "one of the world's largest simulated exercises", involving many U.S. and South Korean warships.

On Friday, 26 March 2010, an explosion was reported to have occurred near Cheonan, a Pohang-class corvette, near the stern of the ship at 9:22 pm local time (12:22 pm GMT/UTC). This caused the ship to break in half five minutes afterward, sinking at approximately 9:30 pm about 1 nautical mile (1.9 km) off the south-west coast of Baengnyeong Island.

Some initial reports suggested that the ship was hit by a North Korean torpedo, and that the South Korean vessel had returned fire. However, the South Korean Ministry of Defense stressed in the first press briefings after the sinking that there was "no indication of North Korean involvement". Cheonan was operating its active sonar at the time, which did not detect any nearby submarine. Several theories have subsequently been put forth by various agencies as to the cause of the sinking. Early reports also suggested that South Korean navy units had shot at an unidentified ship heading towards North Korea, but a defense official later said that this target may have been a flock of birds misidentified on radar.

The ship had a crew of 104 men at the time of sinking, and 58 crewmembers, including all 7 officers on board were rescued by 11:13 pm local time. The remaining 46 crew died.

The stern of Cheonan settled on its left side in 130-metre (430 ft) deep water, close to the coordinates at which the hull broke up, whereas the bow section took longer to sink, before settling, overturned, in water 20 metres (66 ft) deep, 6.4 kilometres (3.5 nmi) away, with a small part of the hull remaining visible.

== Rescue efforts ==
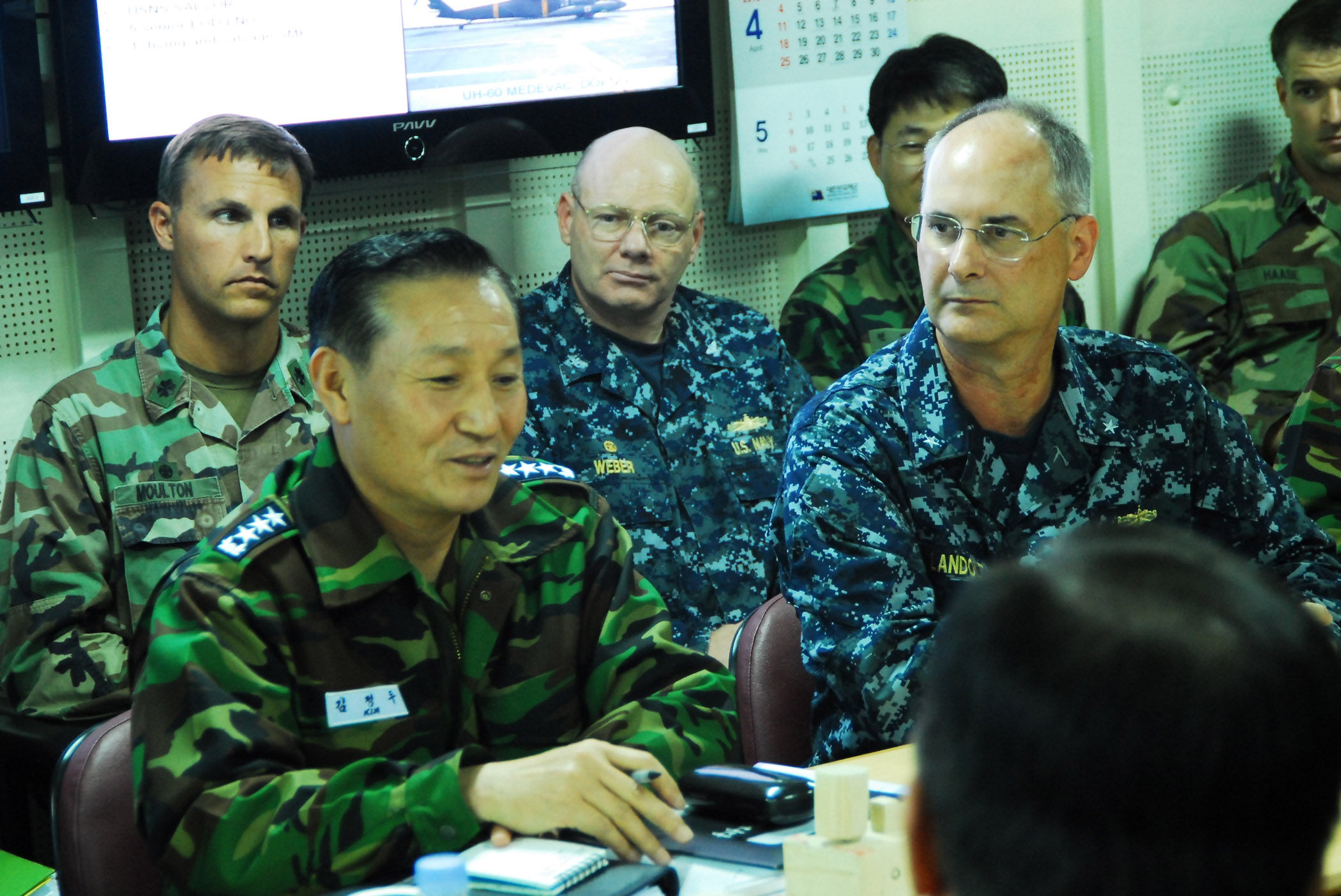
Vice Admiral Kim Jung-du, commander for the Republic of Korea Navy salvage efforts, and Rear Admiral Richard Landolt, on scene commander of U.S. support to South Korean salvage efforts, discuss salvage operations aboard the ROKS Dokdo

Initially six South Korean navy and two South Korean coast guard ships assisted in the rescue as well as aircraft from the Republic of Korea Air Force. It was reported on March 27 that hopes of finding the 46 missing crew alive were fading. Survival time in the water was estimated at two hours and large waves were hampering rescue attempts. After the sinking, President Lee Myung-bak said that recovery of survivors was the main priority. Air was pumped into the ship to keep any survivors alive.

Over 24 military vessels were involved over the course of the search-and-rescue effort, including four U.S. Navy vessels: USNS Salvor, USS Harpers Ferry, USS Curtis Wilbur, and USS Shiloh.

On 30 March 2010 it was reported that one South Korean naval diver (ROKN UDT/SEAL CWO Han Ju-ho) had died after losing consciousness while searching for survivors, and another had been hospitalised.

On 3 April 2010, South Korean officials said that a private fishing boat involved in the rescue operations had collided with a Cambodian freighter, sinking the fishing boat and killing at least two people, with seven reported missing. The same day, the Joint Chiefs of Staff of South Korea said that the body of one of the 46 missing sailors had been found.

Later on 3 April 2010 South Korea called off the rescue operation for the missing sailors, after families of the sailors asked for the operation to be suspended for fear of further casualties among the rescue divers. The military's focus then shifted towards salvage operations, which were predicted to take up to a month to complete.

== Recovery ==
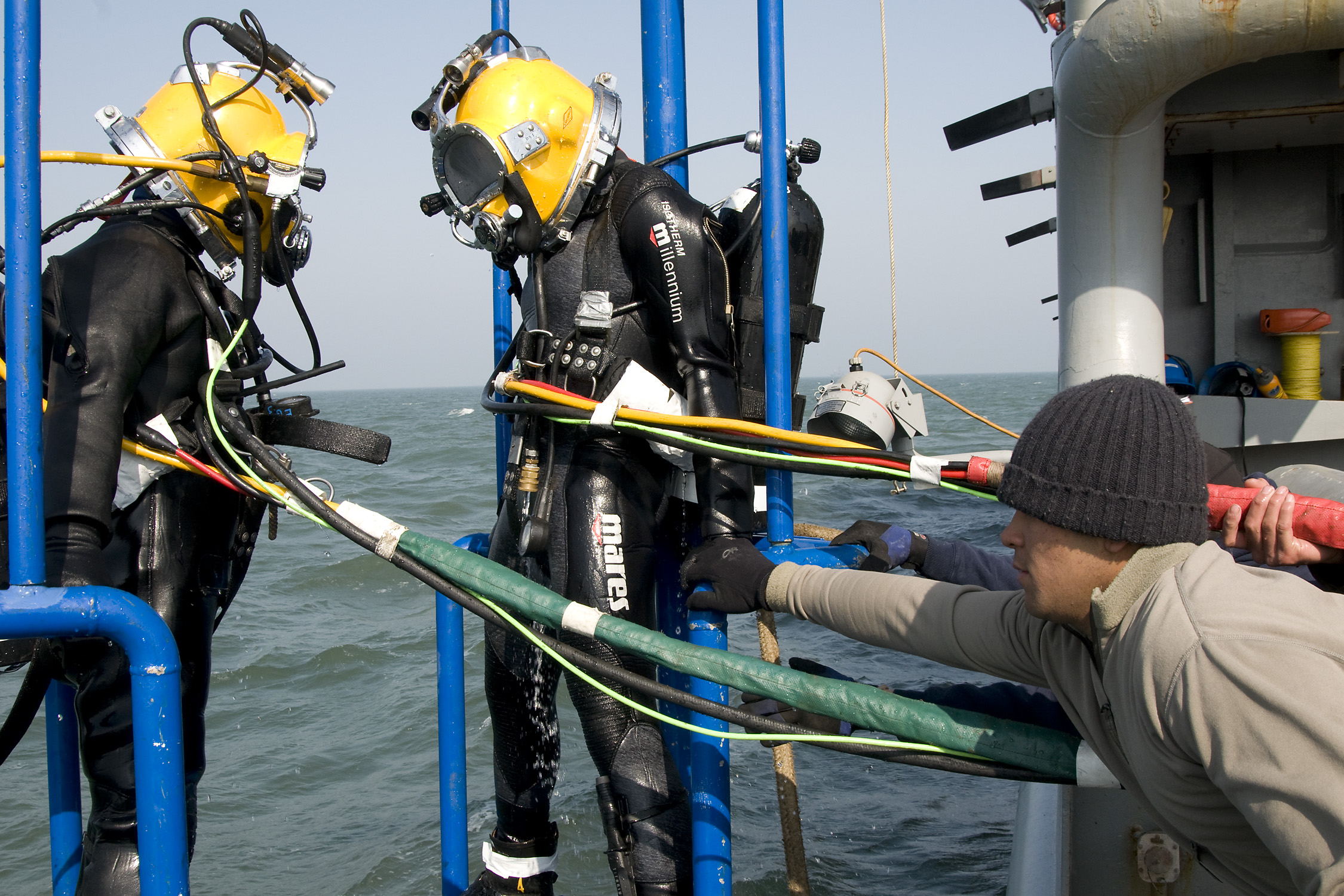
A South Korean and U.S. diver during the recovery phase

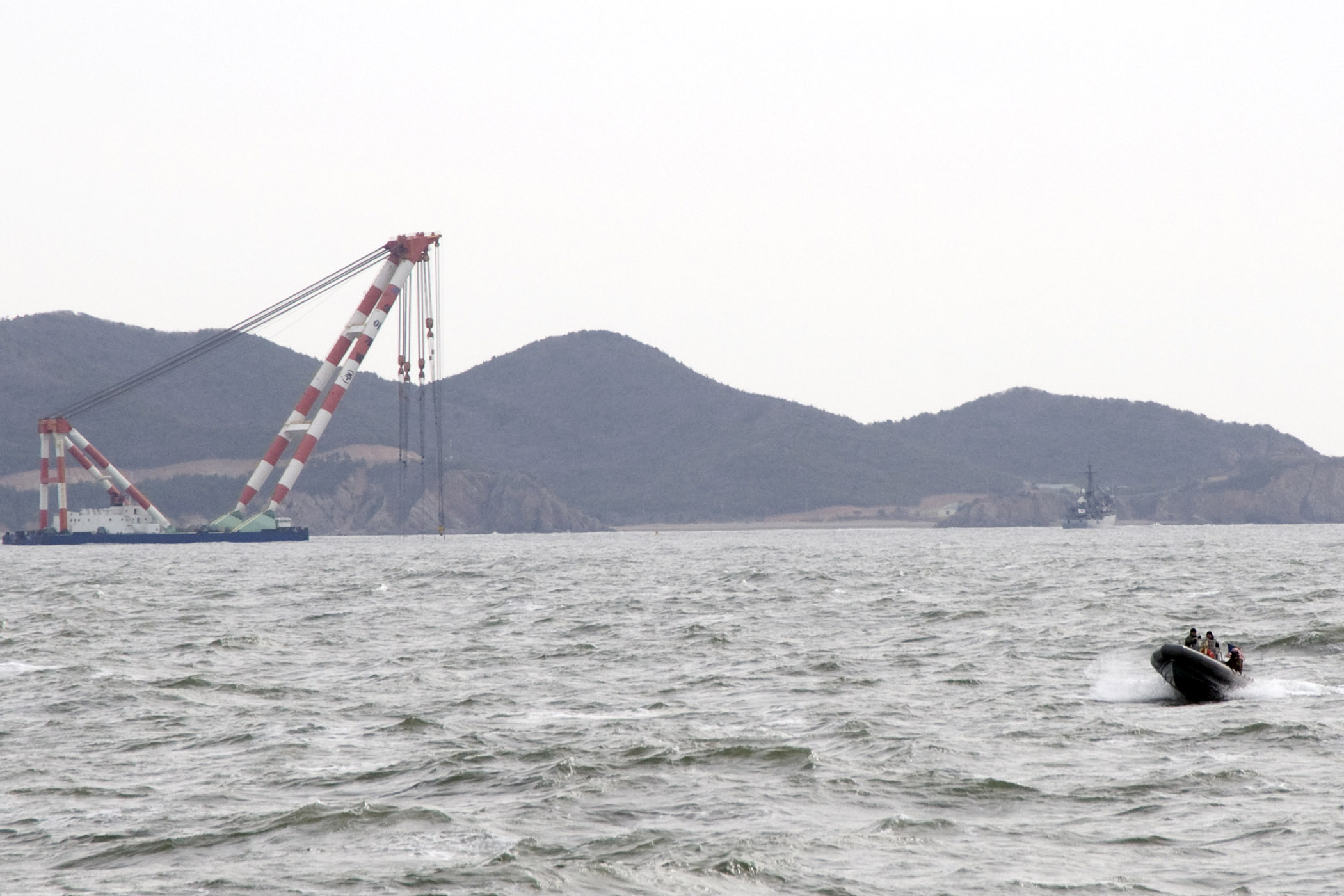
The first, stern section, recovery site

On 15 April 2010, the stern section of the ship was winched from the seabed by a large floating crane, drained of water and placed on a barge for transportation to the Pyongtaek navy base. On 23 April 2010, the stack was recovered, and on 24 April the bow portion was raised. The salvaged parts were taken to Pyongtaek navy base for an investigation into the cause of the sinking by both South Korean and foreign experts.

The bodies of 40 personnel out of 46 who went down with the ship were recovered. Their bodies were laid to rest at the Daejeon National Cemetery.

== Cause of sinking ==
=== Investigation ===
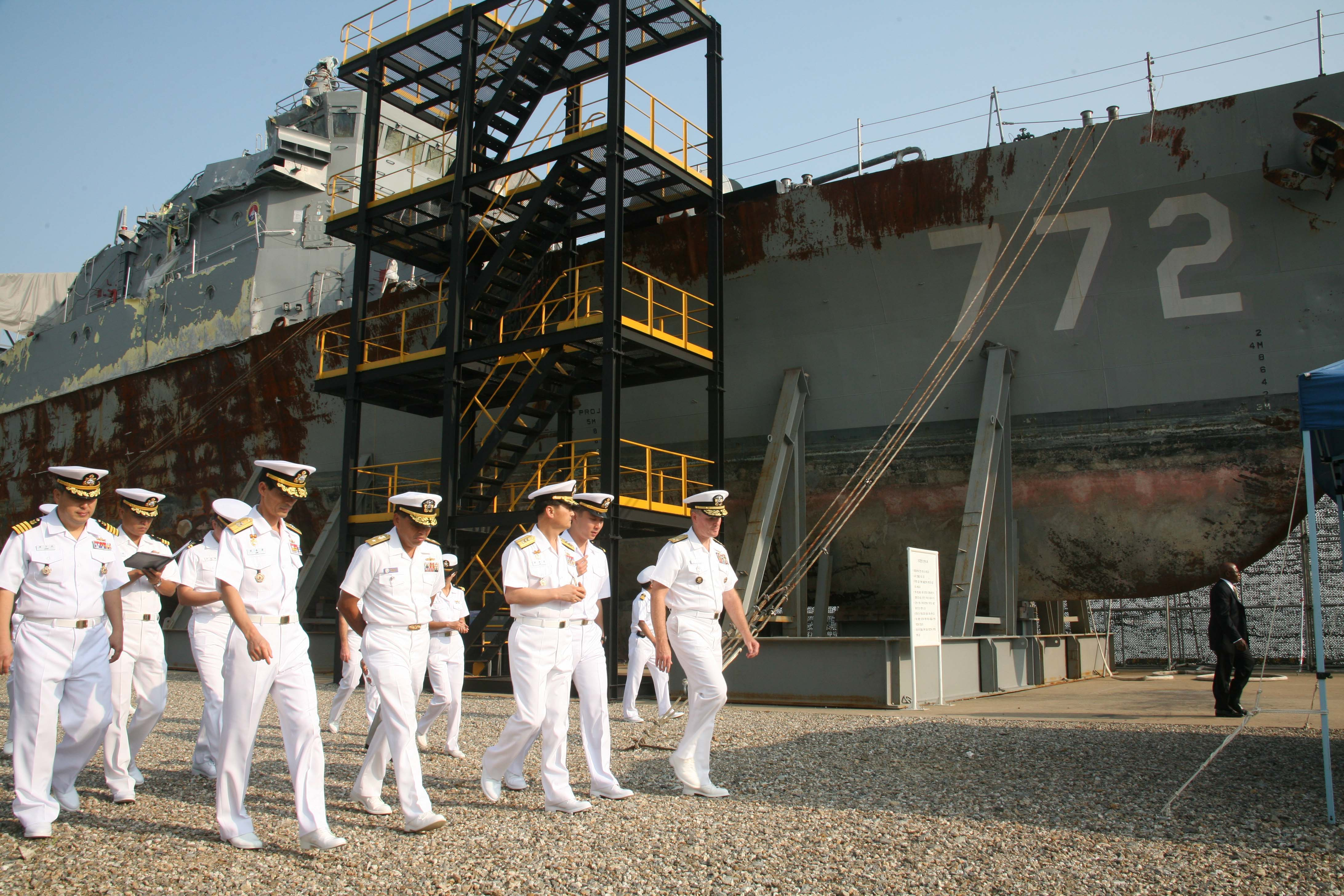
South Korean and U.S. Navy admirals inspecting the wreckage of Cheonan at Pyeongtaek on 13 September 2010.

After raising the ship, South Korea and the United States formed a joint investigative team to discover the cause of the sinking. Later South Korea announced that it intended to form an international group to investigate the sinking including Canada, Britain, Sweden and Australia.

On 16 April 2010, Yoon Duk-yong, co-chairman of the investigation team, said "In an initial examination of Cheonan's stern, South Korean and U.S. investigators found no traces showing that the hull had been hit directly by a torpedo. Instead, we've found traces proving that a powerful explosion caused possibly by a torpedo had occurred underwater. The explosion might have created a bubble jet that eventually generated an enormous shock wave and caused the ship to break in two." Traces of an explosive chemical substance used in torpedoes, RDX, were later found in May 2010.

The Washington Post reported on 19 May 2010, that a team of investigators from Sweden, Australia, Britain, and the United States had concluded that a North Korean torpedo sank the ship. The team found that the torpedo used was identical to a North Korean torpedo previously captured by South Korea. On 25 April 2010, the investigative team announced that the cause of the sinking was a non-contact underwater explosion.

On 7 May 2010, a government official said that a team of South Korean civilian and military experts had found traces of RDX, a high explosive more powerful than TNT and used in torpedoes. On 19 May 2010, the discovery of a fragment of metal containing a serial number similar to one on a North Korean torpedo salvaged by South Korea in 2003 was announced.

In their summary for the United Nations Security Council, the investigation group was described as the "Joint Civilian-Military Investigation Group of the Republic of Korea with the participation of international experts from Australia, Sweden, the United Kingdom and the United States, and the Multinational Combined Intelligence Task Force, comprising the Republic of Korea, Australia, Canada, the United Kingdom and the United States," which consisted of "25 experts from 10 top Korean expert agencies, 22 military experts, 3 experts recommended by the National Assembly, and 24 foreign experts constituting 4 support teams".

=== Joint Civilian-Military Investigation Group (JIG) report ===
==== Summary ====
On 20 May the South Korean-led investigation group released a summary of their report in which they concluded that the sinking of the warship was the result of a North Korean torpedo attack, commenting that "The evidence points overwhelmingly to the conclusion that the torpedo was fired by a North Korean submarine." The inquiry also alleged that a group of small submarines, escorted by a support ship, departed from a North Korean naval base a few days before the sinking. The specific weapon used was alleged to be a North Korean manufactured CHT-02D torpedo, of which substantial parts were recovered. The torpedo utilizes acoustic/wake homing and passive acoustic tracking methods.

According to the Chosun Ilbo, South Korean investigators told their journalists that they believe that one or two North Korean submarines, a Yono-class submarine and the other a Sang-O-class submarine, departed a naval base at Cape Bipagot accompanied by a support ship on 23 March 2010. One of the submarines, according to the report, detoured around to the west side of Baengnyeong Island, arriving on 25 March 2010. There, it waited about 30 metres (98 ft) under the ocean's surface in waters 40 to 50 metres (130 to 160 ft) deep for Cheonan to pass by.

Investigators were reported to believe that the submarine fired the torpedo from about 3 km (1.9 mi) away, timed for a period when tidal forces in the area were slow. The North Korean vessel returned to port on 28 March 2010. Such detailed information on the North Korean submarine movements, and attack position, was not in the official summary or final report.

Simulations indicated that 250 kg (550 lb) of TNT equivalent explosive at 6 to 9 metres (20 to 30 ft) depth, 3 metres (9.8 ft) to the port of the center line, would result in the damage seen to Cheonan.

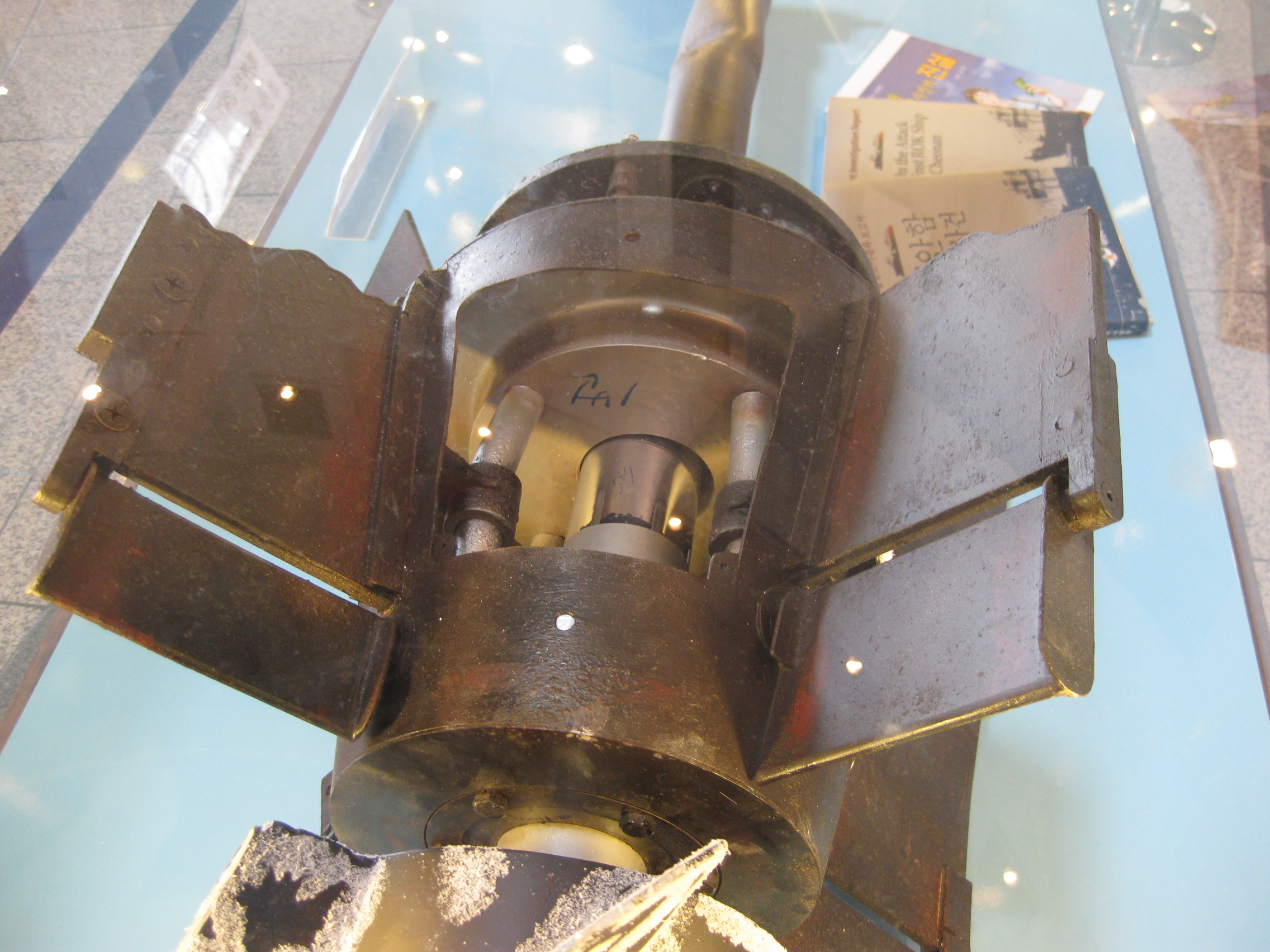
CHT-02D torpedo propulsion section showing 1번 marking

The torpedo parts recovered at the site of the explosion by a dredging ship on 15 May which include the 5×5 bladed contra-rotating propellers, propulsion motor and a steering section, was claimed to match the schematics of the CHT-02D torpedo included in introductory brochures provided to foreign countries by North Korea for export purposes. An incorrect, though similar, torpedo schematic had by mistake been shown at the televised RIG briefing for comparison with the recovered parts. The correct schematic has never been made public.

At the end of the propulsion section, markings in Korean script reading "1번" (romanized: 1beon, translated: no. 1) were discovered. Some critics have pointed out that these markings are inconsistent with North Korean practices, as the character "번" is not commonly used there, with "호" (romanized: ho) being used in its place instead. This is corroborated by the fact that another North Korean torpedo obtained seven years earlier was indeed marked using the "호" character. Others have refuted that a yet-different captured North Korean torpedo did use the "번" character, and Lee Kwang Soo, a former North Korean submarine helmsman living in the South Korea since his capture during the 1996 Gangneung submarine infiltration incident, has also confirmed that the "번" character is "a normal thing in North Korea" and that it is used "for the repair of parts". Russian and Chinese torpedoes are marked in their respective languages.

The full report had not been released to the public at the time, though the South Korean legislature was provided with a five-page synopsis of the report.

==== Full report ====
A draft copy of the report was obtained by Time magazine in early August 2010, before the final report was released. According to Time, the report assessed in detail ten possible alternative scenarios, with extensive discussion and explanation of why those ten were not possible. It finally settled on the eleventh explanation, which was a North Korean attack, which it said was a "high possibility."

In support of this conclusion, the report says that witnesses had reported seeing flashes of light or sounds of an explosion, as well as that the US Navy analysis of the wreck concluded that a torpedo containing 250 kilograms of explosives had collided with Cheonan six to nine meters below the waterline. Damage to the hull supported this conclusion, while inconsistent with what would be expected if the ship had run aground or had been hit with a missile.

On 13 September 2010, the full report was released. It concluded that Cheonan had been sunk due to a torpedo explosion, which, while not having contacted the ship, exploded several meters from the hull of the ship and caused a shockwave and bubble effect of sufficient strength to severely damage and sink the ship.

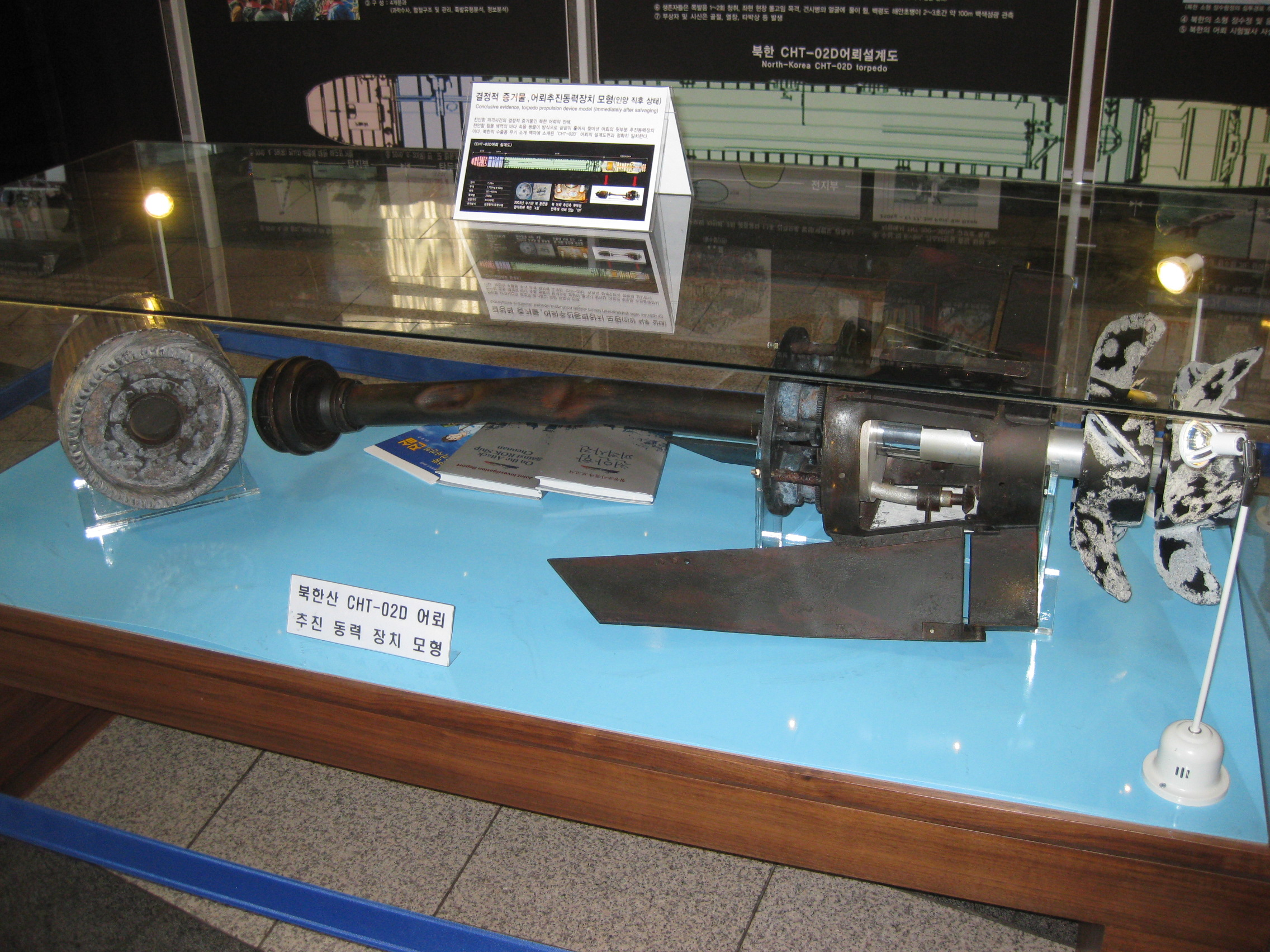
CHT-02D torpedo wreckage on display at the War Memorial of Korea, 23 March 2011

=== South Korean opinions ===
According to a survey conducted by Seoul National University's Institute for Peace and Unification Studies, less than one third of South Koreans trust the findings of the multinational panel. A later survey by the JoongAng Ilbo newspaper in 2011 found that 68 percent of South Koreans trusted the government's report that Cheonan was sunk by a North Korean submersible.

Lee Jung Hee, a lawmaker with the opposition Democratic Labor Party, was sued for defamation by seven people at South Korea's Joint Chiefs of Staff. Lee said during a speech in the national assembly that while the Defense Ministry had said there was no feed from a thermal observation device showing the moment the warship's stern and bow split apart, such a video did exist. Prosecutors then questioned Shin Sang-cheol, who served on the panel that investigated the incident and also runs Seoprise, over his assertion that Cheonan sank in an accident and that the evidence linking the North to the torpedo was tampered with.

The Defense Ministry asked the National Assembly to eject Shin from the panel for "arousing public mistrust." Shin stated that he doubted the official conclusion on the sinking, saying that when he looked at the dead sailors' bodies, they bore no signs of an explosion. Shin wrote a letter addressed to US Secretary of State Hillary Clinton showing the evidence for his contention that the ship ran aground and then collided with another vessel.

=== Russian Navy experts assessment ===
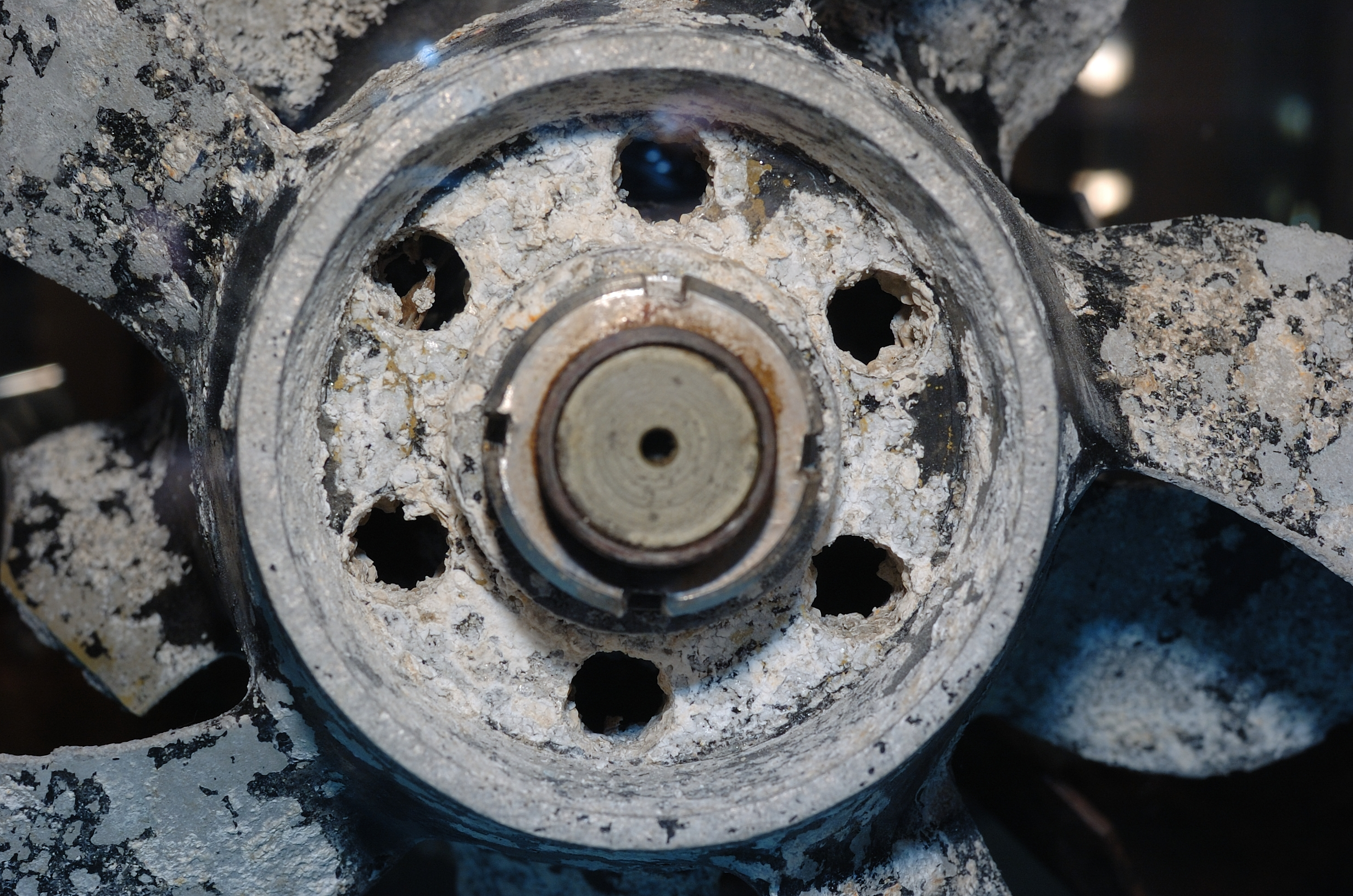
Rear of the torpedo, with a clamshell fragment inside one of screw hub holes

Near the end of May a team of Russian Navy submarine and torpedo experts visited South Korea to conduct an assessment of the South Korean led investigation. The team returned to Russia with samples for further physical-chemical analysis. No official statement on the assessment has been made. It was claimed that the assessment concluded Cheonan was not sunk by a North Korean bubble jet torpedo, but did not come to any firm conclusion about the cause of the sinking. An Indian newspaper The Hindu quoted a Russian Navy source stating that "after examining the available evidence and the ship wreckage Russian experts came to the conclusion that a number of arguments produced by the international investigation in favour of the DPRK's involvement in the corvette sinking were not weighty enough".

On 27 July 2010, The Hankyoreh published what it claimed was a detailed summary of the Russian Navy expert team's analysis. According to The Hankyoreh, the Russian investigators concluded that Cheonan touched the sea floor and damaged one of its propellers prior to a non-contact explosion, possibly caused by setting off a mine while the ship was trying to maneuver into deeper water. Visual examination of the torpedo parts South Korea found purportedly indicated that it had been in the water for more than six months. On the following day South Korean officials responded with "a full-scale refutation".

On 3 August 2010 Russian UN ambassador Vitaly Churkin stated that his country's investigative report's conclusions into the sinking would not be made public. Withholding the investigation results was seen as insensitive by South Korea, but avoided political damage to a number of states.

=== Chinese statements ===
During talks between the American and Chinese governments in late May 2010, Chinese officials were reported by Yoichi Shimatsu, a commentator for the Chinese state-run CCTV-9, to have stated that the sinking of Cheonan had been as a result of an American rising mine, which was moored to the seabed and propels itself into a ship detected by sound or magnetics, planted during anti-submarine exercises that were conducted by the South Korean and US navies shortly before the sinking. To back up their statements, the Chinese said that North Korean submarines such as the one believed to have sunk Cheonan were incapable of moving undetected within South Korean waters, and a rising mine would have damaged the ship by splitting the hull, as was done to Cheonan, rather than simply holing the vessel as a conventional torpedo does. A conventional torpedo traveling at 40–50 knots (74–93 km/h; 46–58 mph) would also be completely destroyed upon impact, which was stated to contradict the torpedo parts found later.

=== Other international research ===
A separate investigation conducted by scientists at the University of Manitoba yielded results that conflict with the official investigation's findings. According to the leader of the investigation, residue on the hull of the ship that was claimed to have been aluminum oxide, which is a byproduct of explosions such as that of a torpedo, had a far higher ratio of oxygen to aluminum, leading the researchers to conclude that "we cannot say that the substance adhering to the Cheonan was the explosion byproduct of aluminum oxide." The South Korean Ministry of Defense issued a rebuttal to the findings, saying, "The detonation of explosives containing aluminum occurs within hundreds of thousandths of a second under high temperatures of more than 3,000 degrees Celsius and high pressures of more than 200,000 atm, and most of it becomes noncrystalline aluminum oxide."

A report published online by Nature on 8 July 2010 noted several instances of groups or individuals disagreeing with the official report. The article also notes the rebuttal of those disagreements by analysts and government officials, with one analyst arguing that the sinking was "consistent with North Korea's behaviour in the past."

In 2013, an academic paper was published analysing the available seismic data. It calculated that the seismic data recorded would be accounted for by a 136 kg (300 lb) TNT-equivalent charge, similar to the explosive yield of land control mines which had been abandoned in the vicinity. In 2014, an academic paper was published analysing the spectra of the seismic signals and hydroacoustic reverberation waves generated. The paper found it doubtful that the vibrations of the water column were caused by an underwater explosion, instead finding that the recorded seismic spectra were consistent with the natural vibration frequencies of a large submarine with a length of around 113 metres (371 ft). This raised the possibility that the sinking was caused by a collision with a large submarine, rather than an explosion.

== Reaction ==
=== South Korea ===
South Korean President Lee Myung-bak convened an emergency meeting of the Joint Chiefs of Staff. Orders were given to the military to concentrate on rescuing the survivors. In Seoul, police were put on alert. At the time, a spokesman for the South Korean military stated that there was no evidence that North Korea had been involved in the incident. A large group of relatives of the missing sailors protested outside the navy base at Pyeongtaek over the lack of information provided to them.

On 28 March relatives were taken to the site of the sunken vessel. Some relatives stated that survivors had claimed that the Cheonan had been in a poor state of repair. The Korean media have raised the issue of why the sister ship Sokcho, which was operating nearby, did not come to the rescue of the sinking ship but instead fired shots at radar images which were later confirmed to be migratory birds.

On 5 April 2010, President Lee Myung-bak visited Baengnyeong Island. He reiterated that it was risky to speculate over the cause, and the joint military and civilian investigation team would determine the cause. He said, "We have to find the cause in a way that satisfies not only our people but also the international community". The president of South Korea had mourned the victims and said that he will respond "resolutely" to the sinking without yet laying blame for its cause.

On 24 May Lee Myung-bak said the South would "resort to measures of self-defense in case of further military provocation of the Democratic People's Republic of Korea." He also supported readopting the official description of the North as the "main enemy."

South Korea pursued measures from the United Nations Security Council after the incident, although the language used in the country's statements towards such measures became progressively weaker. In announcements made soon after the sinking, the government said that any draft presented by South Korea would explicitly state that North Korea was responsible for the incident, but by early July, the language had been reduced to only referring to "those responsible," in response to concerns from Russia.

==== Diplomatic ====
Since the incident, the South Korean government has been reluctant to engage in further diplomacy with North Korea over disputes such as North Korea's nuclear weapons program. In response to a request by China, in April 2011 South Korea agreed to talks, but South Korean government officials commented that an apology from North Korea for the sinking would probably be necessary to facilitate any significant progress in the dialogues.

==== Military ====
On 2 May it was reported that South Korea's naval minister vowed "retaliation" against those responsible. Admiral Kim Sung-chan, at a publicly televised funeral for Cheonan's dead crew members in Pyeongtaek, stated that, "We will not sit back and watch whoever caused this pain for our people. We will hunt them down and make them pay a bigger price."

On 4 May President Lee proposed "extensive reformations" for the South Korean military regarding the sinking incident. After the official report was released South Korea has said that it will take strong countermeasures against the North.

==== Societal ====
Writing in The New York Times, Korea scholar Brian Reynolds Myers stated that there was not much anger or outrage among ordinary South Koreans over the sinking. He stated that due to the inherently ethnic nature of Korean nationalism, there was no major uproar over the incident in South Korean society because of ethnic solidarity with North Koreans that many South Koreans feel, which Myers said overruled patriotism towards South Korea in many cases involving North Korea.

==== Trade ====
On 24 May 2010, South Korea announced it would stop nearly all its trade with North Korea as a result of the official report blaming North Korea for the sinking. South Korea also announced it would prohibit North Korean vessels from using its shipping channels. According to the New York Times, the trade embargoes were "the most serious action" South Korea could take short of military action. The United States openly supported South Korea's decision. The embargo is expected to cost the North Korean economy roughly $200 million a year. The decision to cease trade was followed up with the United States and South Korea announcing they would conduct joint naval exercises in response to the sinking.

==== Psychological warfare ====
The South Korean military announced that it would resume psychological warfare directed at North Korea. This would include both loudspeaker and FM radio propaganda broadcasts across the Korean Demilitarized Zone (DMZ). Daily NK, a South Korean-based news website, has claimed that a North Korean commander has stated, "If South Korea establishes new psychological warfare services, we will fire against them in order to eliminate them".

South Korea began propaganda broadcasts into North Korea by radio on 25 May. North Korea responded by putting its troops on high alert, and severed most remaining ties and communications with South Korea in response to what it called a "smear campaign" by Seoul. South Korean military propaganda FM broadcasts were resumed at 18:00 (local time) starting with the song "HuH" by K-pop band 4minute.

As part of the propaganda broadcasts, South Korea reinstalled loudspeakers at eleven places along the DMZ. There was originally a plan to also use electronic signs, although due to cost, the plan was reportedly being reconsidered. On 13 June, South Korean media announced that the South Korean Defense Minister, Kim Tae-young, had said that anti-North Korea broadcasts were planned to resume.

==== Suppressing internal dissent ====
Discourse over the events leading to the sinking of Cheonan was tightly controlled by the South Korean government in the months after the incident. On 8 May 2010, a former senior presidential secretary who served under Roh Moo-hyun, Park Seon-won, was charged with libel by South Korea's Defense Minister, Kim Tae-young, over comments he made during a 22 April interview on MBC radio asking for greater disclosure from the military and government. Park Seon-won's response to the charge was: "I asked for the disclosure of information for a transparent and impartial investigation into the cause of the Cheonan sinking;" he added that "the libel suit seeks to silence public suspicion over the incident."

South Korea's Minister of Public Administration and Security, Maeng Hyung-kyu, announced on 20 May 2010 that the government was stepping up efforts to prosecute people who spread "groundless rumors" over the internet: "Anyone who makes false reports or articles about the incident could seriously damage national security. We will not let these be the basis of any risks the nation faces." Moreover, he announced the government would step up efforts to prevent "illegal gatherings" regarding the sinking of Cheonan.

A South Korean military oversight board, the Board of Inspection and Audit, has accused senior South Korean naval leaders of lying and hiding information. Said the board, "Military officers deliberately left out or distorted key information in their report to senior officials and the public because they wanted to avoid being held to account for being unprepared."

In 2013, a documentary film named Project Cheonan Ship was released in South Korea about the sinking, including a number of possible alternative causes for the sinking. Members and relatives of the South Korean navy sought a court injunction to block the film's release on the basis that the film distorted the facts. The injunction was denied in court, however, a major cinema chain, Megabox, withdrew the film after warnings from conservative groups that they planned to picket showings of the film.

=== North Korea ===
North Korea's Korean Central News Agency (KCNA) released an official response to the investigation on 28 May 2010 stating that part of a torpedo doing so much damage to a ship would not survive:

Besides, the assertion that the screw shaft and engine remained undamaged and unchanged in shape is also a laughing shock. Even U.S. and British members of the international investigation team, which had blindly backed the South Korean regime in its 'investigation', were perplexed at the exhibit in a glass box.

On 17 April 2010, it was reported that North Korea officially denied having had anything to do with the sinking. An article from KCNA entitled "Military Commentator Denies Involvement in Ship Sinking" stated that the event was an accident.

... we have so far regarded the accident as a regretful accident that should not happen in the light of the fact that many missing persons and most of rescued members of the crew are fellow countrymen forced to live a tiresome life in the puppet army.

On 21 May 2010, North Korea offered to send their own investigative team to review the evidence compiled by South Korea, and the Hankyoreh quoted Kim Yeon-chul, professor of unification studies at Inje University, commenting on the offer: "It is unprecedented in the history of inter-Korean relations for North Korea to propose sending an investigation team in response to an issue that has been deemed a 'military provocation by North Korea,'"and thus "The Cheonan situation has entered a new phase."

According to the New Zealand-based news website, Stuff, North Korea also warned of a wide range of hostile reactions to any move by South Korea to hold it accountable for the sinking.

If the South puppet group comes out with 'response' and 'retaliation', we will respond strongly with ruthless punishment including the total shutdown of North-South ties, abrogation of the North-South agreement on non-aggression and abolition of all North-South cooperation projects.

On 25 May, North Korea released a list of measures in response to South Korea's sanctions. This included the cutting of all ties and communications, except for the Kaesong Industrial Region. They would revert to a wartime footing in regard to South Korea and disallow any South Korean ships or aircraft to enter the territory of North Korea.

On 27 May, North Korea announced that it would scrap an agreement aimed at preventing accidental naval clashes with South Korea. It also announced that any South Korean vessel found crossing the disputed maritime border would be immediately attacked.

On 28 May, KCNA stated that "it is the United States that is behind the case of Cheonan. The investigation was steered by the U.S. from its very outset." It also accused the United States of manipulating the investigation and named the administration of US President Barack Obama directly of using the case for "escalating instability in the Asia-Pacific region, containing big powers and emerging unchallenged in the region."

On 29 May, North Korea warned the United Nations to be wary of evidence presented in the international investigation, likening the case to the claims of weapons of mass destruction that the United States used to justify its war against Iraq in 2003 and stated that "the U.S. is seriously mistaken if it thinks it can occupy the Korean Peninsula just as it did Iraq with sheer lies." The North Korea foreign minister warned the United Nations Security Council of risks of being "misused". It also accused the United States of joining South Korea in putting "China into an awkward position and keep hold on Japan and South Korea as its servants."

High ranking North Korean military officials denounced the international investigation and said North Korea does not have the type of submarines that supposedly carried out the attack. They also dismissed claims regarding writings on the torpedo and clarified that "when we put serial numbers on weapons, we engrave them with machines." South Korea's Yonhap News Agency quoted South Korean officials as saying that North Korea has about ten of the Yono-class submarine.

On 2 November, KCNA published a detailed rebuttal of the South Korean joint investigative team report.

The Rodong Sinmun claimed that the "probability of a torpedo attack on (the) Cheonan Warship" was 0%.

=== International ===
When the official report on the sinking was released on 20 May there was widespread international condemnation of North Korea's actions. China was one of few exceptions, simply terming the incident "unfortunate" and "urged stability on the peninsula". This was speculated to be China's concern for instability in the Korean Peninsula. Researchers at the Stockholm International Peace Research Institute, drawing on interviews with Chinese officials and foreign policy experts, later argued that there existed an "inability of the top leadership to reach a consensus on how to react" to the issue, contributing to its comparatively restrained response.

On 14 June 2010, South Korea presented the results of its investigation to United Nations Security Council members. In a subsequent meeting with council members North Korea stated that it had nothing to do with the incident. On 9 July 2010 the United Nations Security Council made a Presidential Statement condemning the attack but without identifying the attacker. China had resisted U.S. calls for a tougher line against North Korea.

== Later reports ==
In December 2012, the South Korean Yonhap News Agency reported that a man who previously worked in the North Korean cabinet, who defected to the south in 2011, claimed that the crew of the North Korean submarine which sank Cheonan had been honored by the North Korean government. The defector, known by the alias "Ahn Cheol-nam", stated that the captain, co-captain, engineer, and boatswain of the mini-sub which sank Cheonan had been awarded "Hero of the DPRK" in October 2010.

== Literature ==
- McGlynn, John; Politics in Command: The "International" Investigation into the Sinking of the Cheonan and the Risk of a New Korean War; Asia-Pacific Journal: Japan Focus, Vol. 8, Iss. 24, Art. 3372

== See also ==
- Bombardment of Yeonpyeong
- Korean Air Flight 858
- Korean War
- List of border incidents involving North Korea
- Gulf of Tonkin incident
- USS Maine sinking
