= ROKS Cheonan (PCC-772) =

Pohang-class corvette

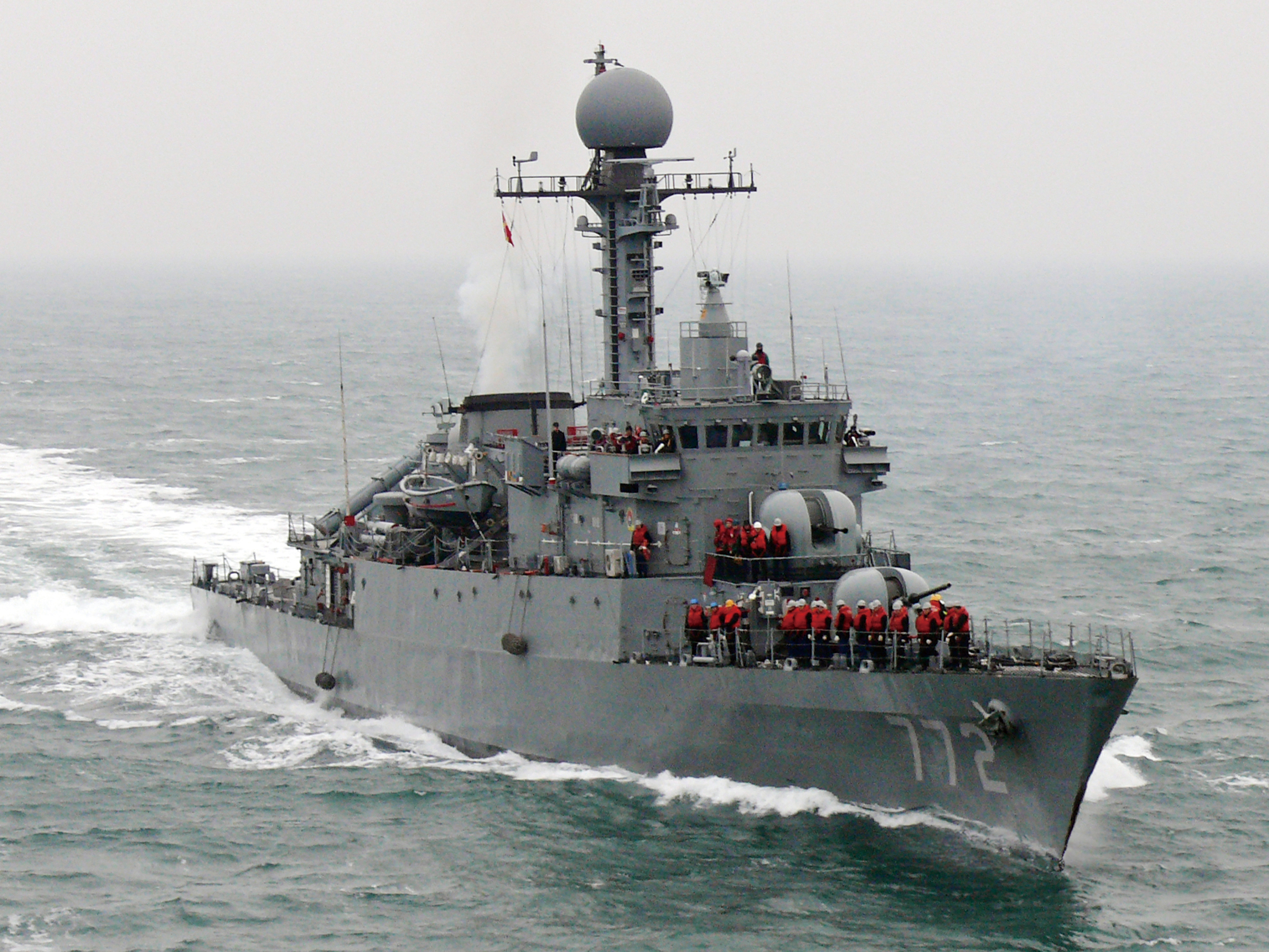
- Cheonan underway at sea in March 2010, three days before being sunk by a torpedo from a North Korean submarine.

History

South Korea
- Name: ROKS Cheonan (天安/천안)
- Namesake: Cheonan
- Builder: Korea Tacoma Marine Ind., Ltd.; Masan, South Korea
- Launched: January 1989
- Commissioned: 1989
- Identification: Pennant number PCC-772
- Fate: Sunk on 26 March 2010 at 37°55′45″N 124°36′02″E
- Status: Salvaged in April 2010. Now a memorial/museum ship in Pyeongtaek.

General characteristics
- Class & type: Pohang-class corvette
- Displacement: 1,200 tonnes
- Length: 88 m (289 ft)
- Draft: 2.9 m (9 ft 6 in)
- Propulsion: CODOG unit
- Speed: Maximum 32 knots (59 km/h); Cruising 15 knots (28 km/h)
- Range: 4,000 nautical miles (7,400 km)
- Crew: 104
- Armament: 4 × Harpoon missiles; 2 × OTO Melara(76mm)/62 compact cannon; 2 × Breda 40mm/70 cannon; 6 × Mark 46 torpedoes; 12 × Mark 9 depth charges

ROKS Cheonan (PCC-772) was a Pohang-class corvette of the Republic of Korea Navy (ROKN), commissioned in 1989. On 26 March 2010, she broke in two following an explosion and sank near the sea border with North Korea, killing 46 sailors. An investigation conducted by an international team of experts from South Korea, United States, United Kingdom, Canada, Australia, and Sweden concluded that Cheonan was sunk by a torpedo launched by a North Korean Yeono-class midget submarine.

== History ==
=== Service history ===
Cheonan was launched in November 1989 from Korea Tacoma Marine Ind., Ltd., Masan, South Korea. The ship's primary mission was coastal patrol, with an emphasis on anti-submarine operations. Cheonan was one of the ships involved in the First Battle of Yeonpyeong in 1999. It is also known that the ship suffered slight damage on the stern in the First Battle of Yeonpyeong. The ship had been scheduled for decommissioning in 2019.

=== Sinking, recovery and aftermath ===
==== Sinking ====
On 26 March 2010, an explosion occurred near the rear of Cheonan, causing the ship to break in two. The cause of this explosion was not immediately determined.

The 1,200-tonne ship started sinking at 21:20 local time (12:20 UTC) about 1 nautical mile (1.9 km) off the south-west coast of Baengnyeong Island in the Yellow Sea. The island is located on the South Korean (ROK) side of the Northern Limit Line, the de facto boundary dividing South from North Korea (DPRK). The ship had a crew of 104 men at the time of sinking, and a total of 58 crew were rescued. Another 46 crew were unaccounted for. Cheonan's captain, Commander Choi Won-il, said that the ship broke into two and the stern sank within five minutes after the explosion and while he was still assessing the situation. On 17 April 2010, North Korea denied any involvement in the sinking of Cheonan.

Baengnyeong Island (red)

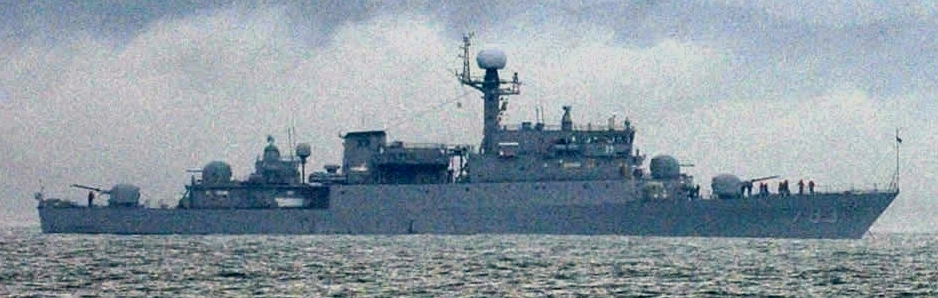
Sinseong, a sister ship of Cheonan

==== Rescue efforts ====
Initially six South Korean navy and two South Korean coast guard ships assisted in the rescue as well as aircraft from the South Korean air force. It was reported on March 27 that hopes of finding the 46 missing crew alive were fading. Survival time in the water was estimated at around two hours and large waves were hampering rescue attempts. The ship sank in 45 meter deep waters with a small portion of the overturned hull still visible above water. It was expected that it would take up to 20 days to salvage the ship.

During the course of the search and rescue effort over 24 military vessels were involved, including at least three US Navy vessels, USNS Salvor, USS Harpers Ferry, and USS Shiloh.

On 30 March 2010 it was reported that one South Korean naval diver (ROKN UDT/SEAL CWO Han Ju-ho) had died after losing consciousness whilst searching for survivors and another had been hospitalised.

On 3 April 2010, South Korean officials said that a private fishing boat involved in the rescue operations had collided with a Cambodian freighter, sinking the fishing boat and killing at least two people, with seven reported missing. The same day, the Joint Chiefs of Staff of South Korea said that one body of the 46 missing sailors had been found.

Later, on 3 April 2010, South Korea called off the rescue operation for the missing sailors, after families of the sailors asked for the operation to be suspended for fear of further casualties among the rescue divers. The military's focus then shifted towards salvage operations, which were predicted to take up to a month to complete.

==== Recovery ====
On 15 April 2010, the stern section of the ship was winched from the seabed by a large floating crane, drained of water and placed on a barge for transportation to the Pyongtaek navy base. The same crane raised the bow portion of Cheonan on 24 April 2010. The salvaged parts of the ship were taken to Pyongtaek navy base for an investigation into the cause of the sinking by both South Korean and foreign experts. The unsalvaged parts were left to break apart.

==== Cause of sinking ====
On 25 April 2010, South Korea's defense minister, Kim Tae-Young, said that the most likely cause of the explosion that sank Cheonan was a torpedo; his statements were the first time that a South Korean official publicly cited such a cause. Kim said that "A bubble jet caused by a heavy torpedo is thought to be the most likely thing to be blamed, but various other possibilities are also under review." A bubble jet is caused by an underwater explosion which changes the pressure of water, and whose force can cause a ship to break apart. The bubble jet theory was supported by one of the investigators into the incident, who had said that there was no evidence that an explosion had occurred in contact with a ship, and that a non-contact explosion had most likely broken the ship in half.

On 20 May 2010, a South Korean-led international commission investigating the sinking of Cheonan presented its findings, stating that the ship was sunk by a North Korean torpedo attack. The torpedo parts recovered at the site of the explosion by a dredging ship on 15 May, which include 5x5 bladed contra-rotating propellers, propulsion motor and a steering section, were claimed to perfectly match the schematics of the CHT-02D torpedo included in introductory brochures provided to foreign countries by North Korea for export purposes. The markings in Hangul, which read "1번" (or No. 1 in English), found inside the end of the propulsion section were said to have been consistent with markings on a previously obtained North Korean torpedo. However, some (The Hankyoreh) have pointed out without the proper reason that in the North, "호" (pronounced "ho") is most often used rather than "번"; and that a North Korean torpedo found seven years ago bears the marking "4호". Russian and Chinese torpedoes are marked in their respective languages. The CHT-02D torpedo manufactured by North Korea utilizes acoustic/wake homing and passive acoustic tracking methods. However, an expert at a South Korean missile manufacturer disagreed with the idea that the submarine alleged by ROK authorities to have shot the torpedo actually has the capability: "Sango class submarines are known to be used by North Korean commandos in infiltrating areas or laying mines, but they apparently do not have an advanced system to guide homing weapons. If a smaller class submarine was involved, there is a bigger question mark."

One member of the investigative team, Shin Sang-cheol, who would be summoned on charges of spreading unsubstantiated rumors, publicly expressed doubts by saying "The magnified photo of the evidence showed that the marking was written on the rusted surface. If it were the North who marked it, the marking should have been written on a smooth surface." The Ministry of Defense had earlier tried to remove Shin from the investigative team, saying that "He is not qualified to work as part of the investigation team, as he has been spreading malicious rumors, as well as lacks expertise and has been insincere in his participation in the probe."

On 13 September 2010, the final report was issued by JIG which concluded that, "The Cheonan was split and sunk due to a shockwave and bubble effect generated by the underwater explosion of a torpedo. The detonation location was three meters to port from the center of the gas turbine room and at a depth of 6-9 meters..."

North Korea denied that it was responsible for the sinking. China dismissed the official scenario presented by South Korea and the United States as not credible. An investigation by the Russian Navy was not made public. On 9 July 2010, the United Nations Security Council made a Presidential Statement condemning the attack but without identifying the attacker.

==== Museum ship ====
ROKS Cheonan is now a museum ship at the Pyeongtaek Naval Base. She is stationed near the patrol boat ROKS PKM 357 that was sunk in the Second Battle of Yeonpyeong.

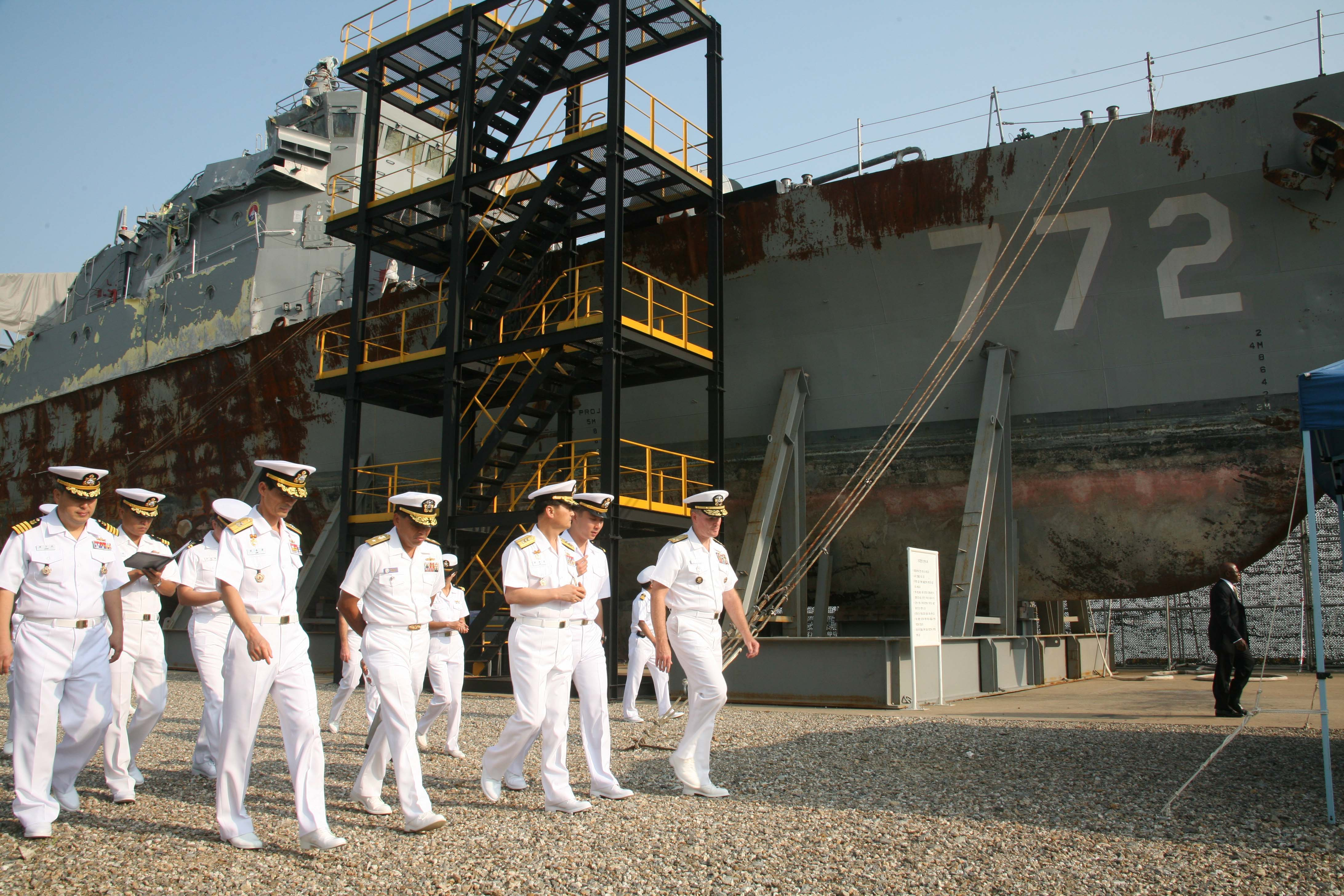

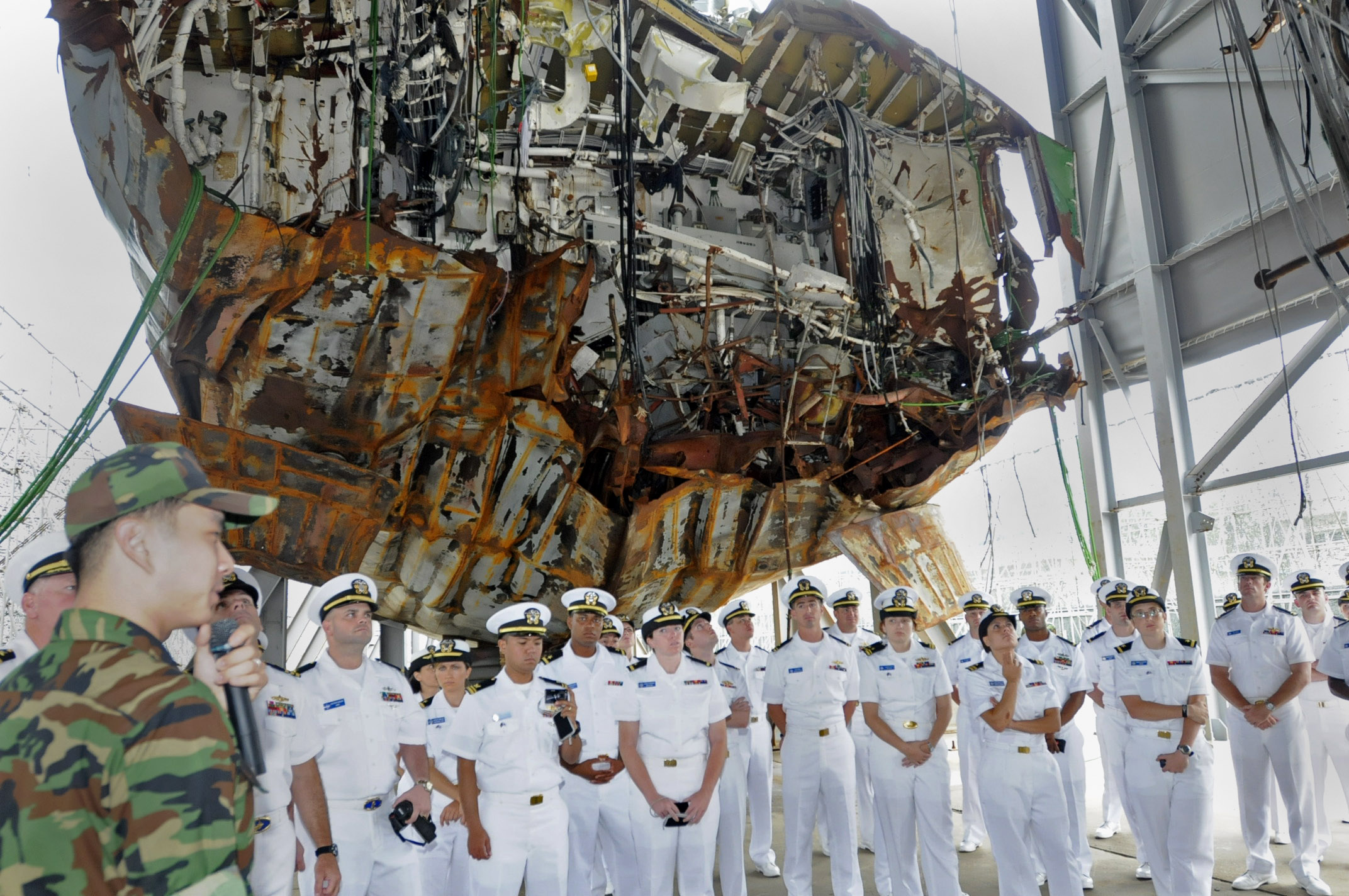

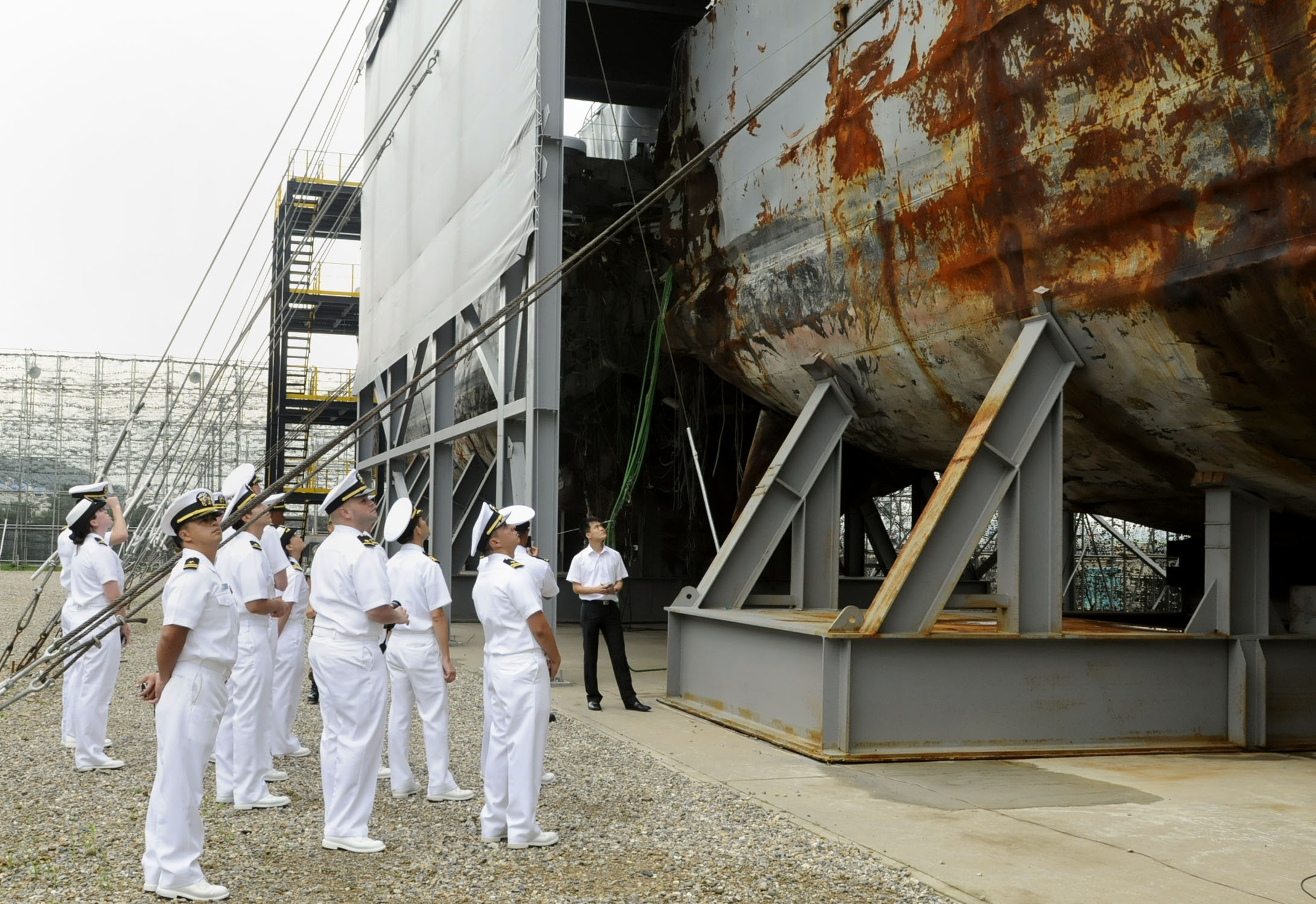

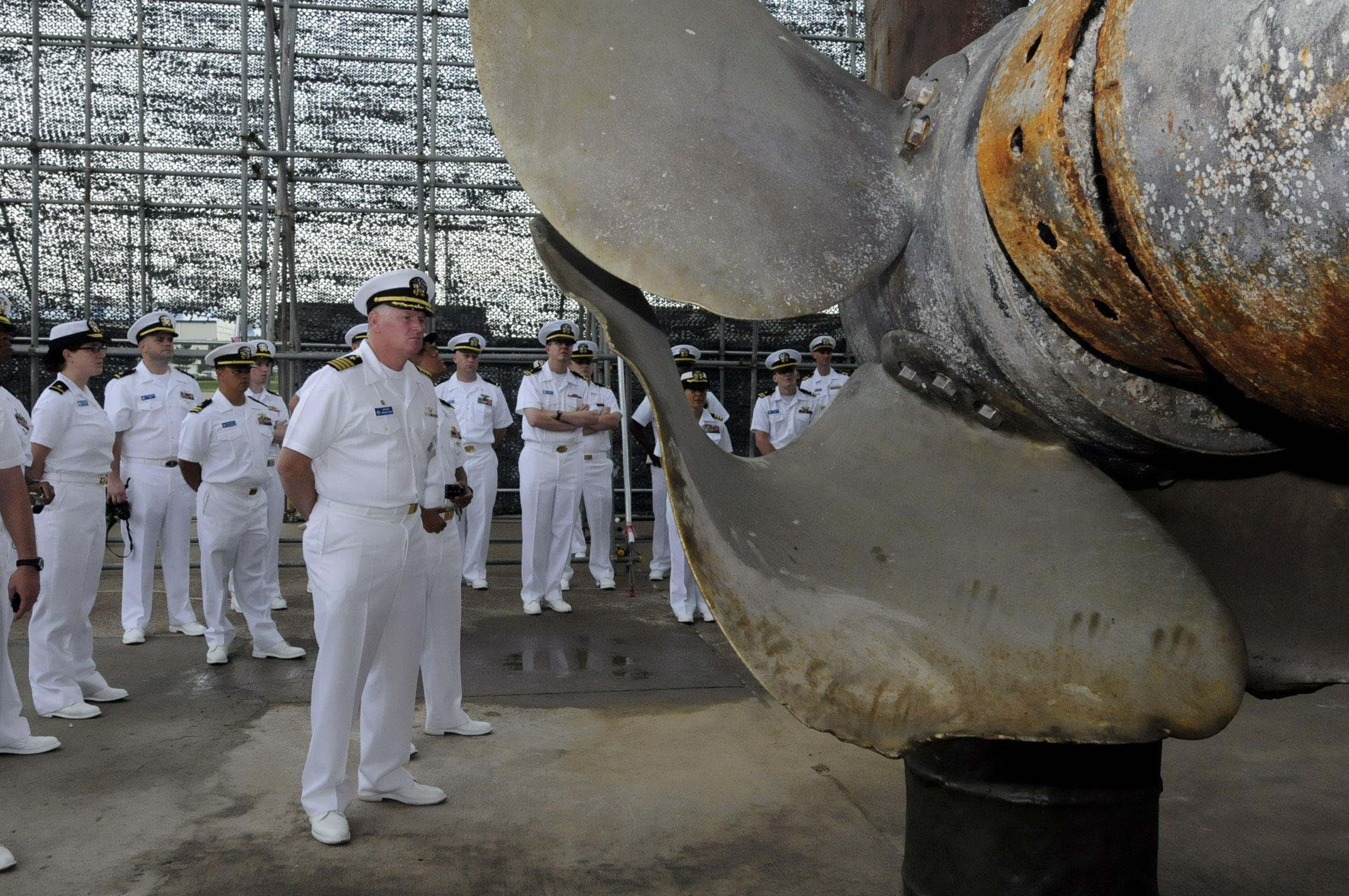

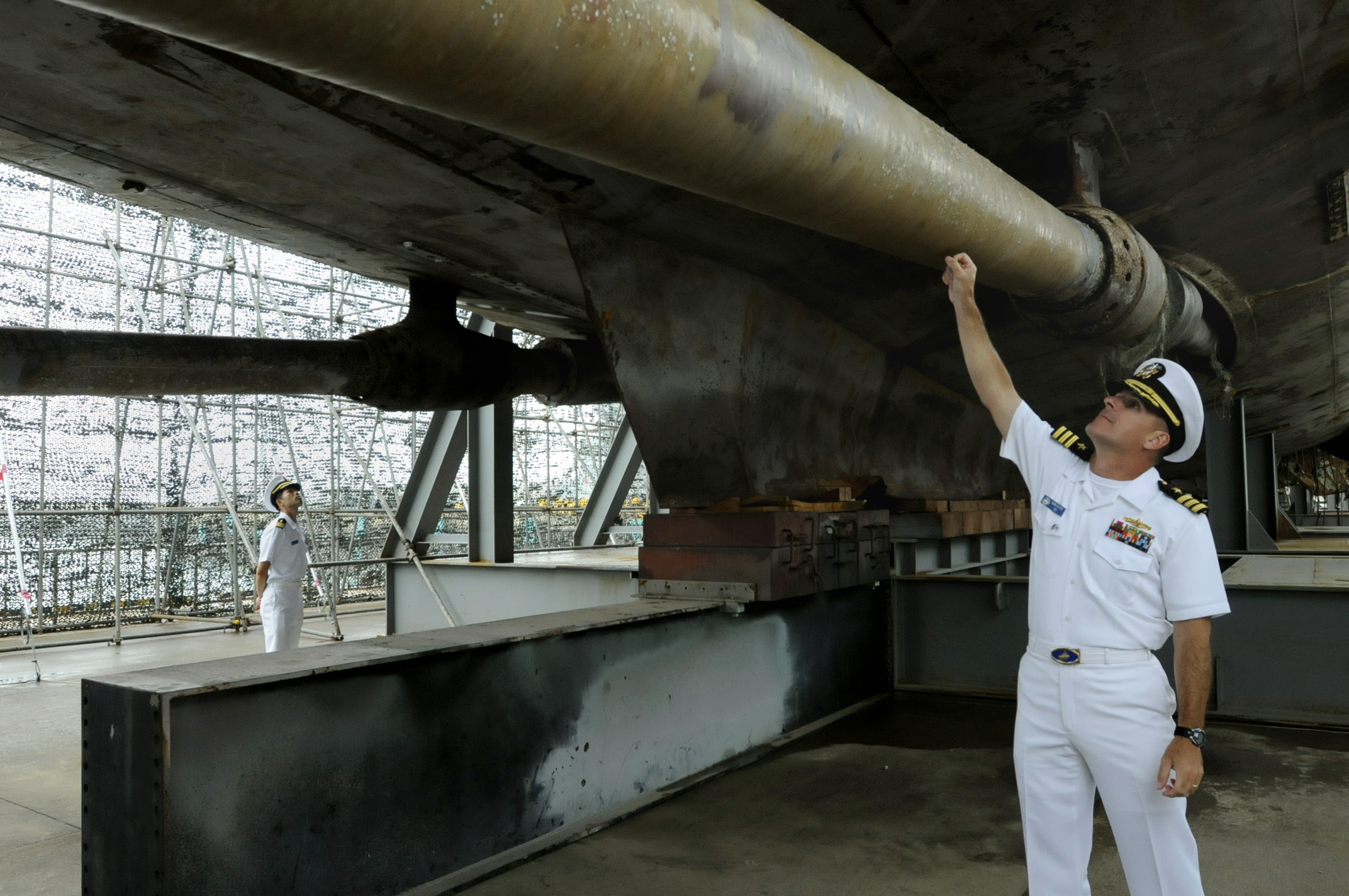

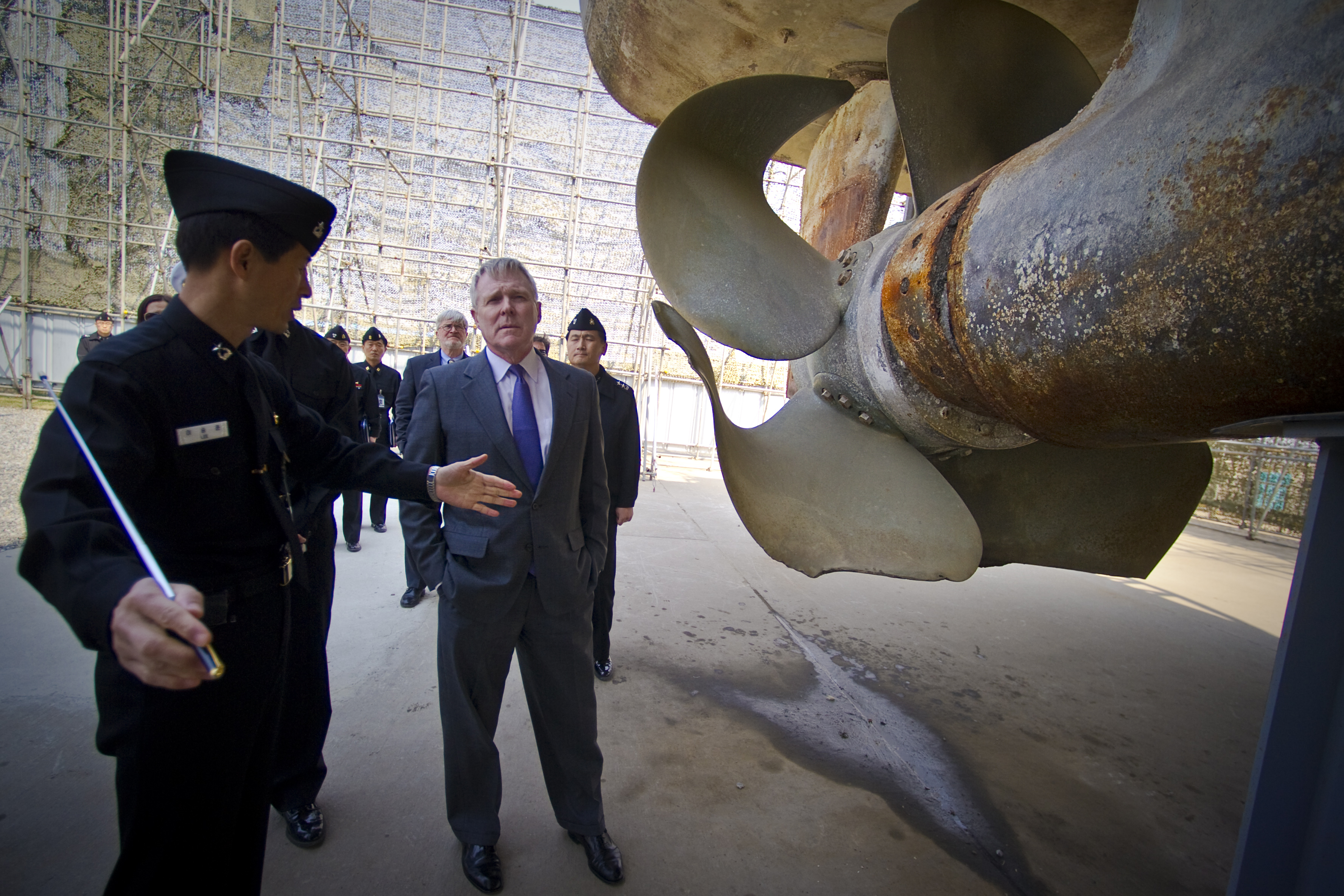

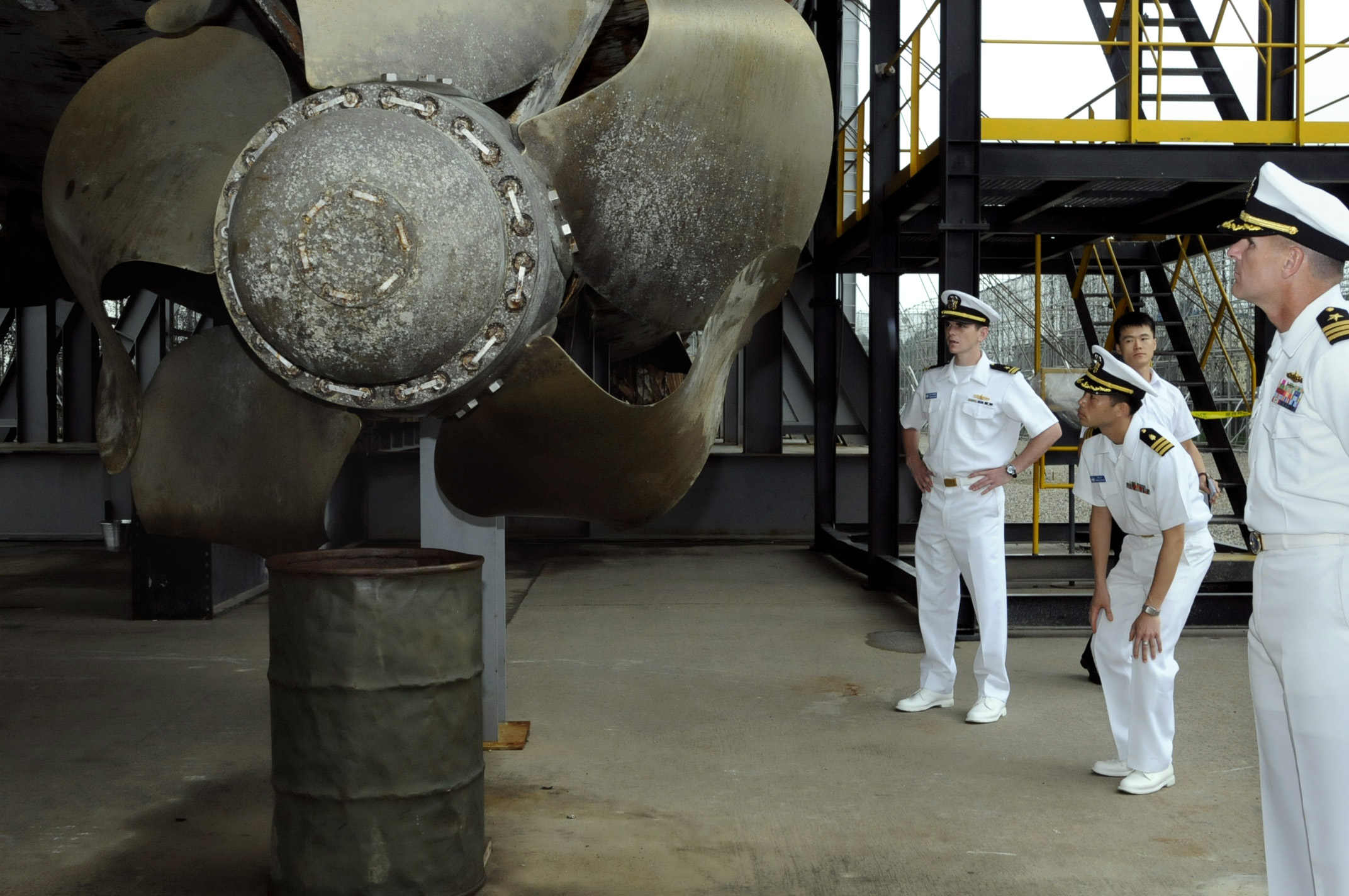

== Design ==
=== Armament ===
The ship's armament consisted of:

- Boeing RGM-84 Harpoon missiles
- Two Otobreda 76 mm/62 compact guns (OTO Melara)
- Two Bofors 40 mm/70 guns
- Six 12.75 in (324 mm) Mark 46 torpedoes
- Twelve Mark 9 depth charges

=== Propulsion ===
Cheonan was powered by a pair of MTU engines, which produced a total of 6,260 horsepower (4.67 MW). These engines powered two propellers, which could move the ship at a top speed of 30 knots (35 mph).
