= United Nations Security Council Resolution 1309 =

UN Security Council Resolution 1309
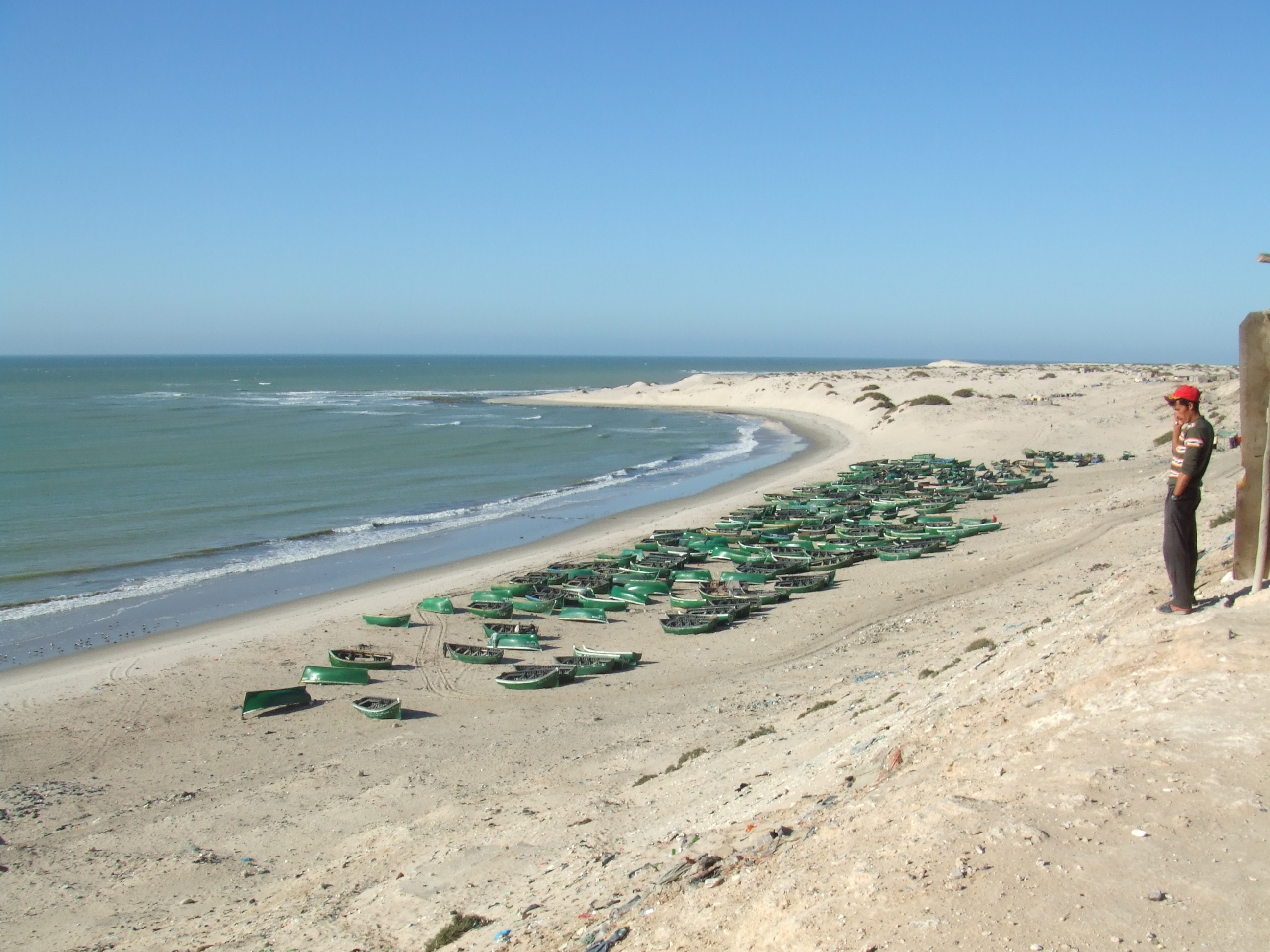
- Western Sahara coast
- Date: 25 July 2000
- Meeting no.: 4,175
- Code: S/RES/1309 (Document)
- Subject: The situation concerning Western Sahara
- Voting summary: 15 voted for; None voted against; None abstained
- Result: Adopted

Security Council composition
- Permanent members: China; France; Russia; United Kingdom; United States
- Non-permanent members: Argentina; Bangladesh; Canada; Jamaica; Malaysia; Mali; Namibia; Netherlands; Tunisia; Ukraine

United Nations Security Council resolution 1309, adopted unanimously on 25 July 2000, after recalling all previous resolutions on the question of the Western Sahara, in particular resolutions 1108 (1997), 1292 (2000), 1301 (2000) and 1308 (2000), the Council extended the mandate of the United Nations Mission for the Referendum in Western Sahara (MINURSO) until 31 October 2000.

The Security Council reiterated its support for MINURSO to implement the Settlement Plan and agreements by the parties to hold a referendum on self-determination for the people of Western Sahara. It noted that fundamental differences remained between Morocco and the Polisario Front over interpretations of the main provisions of the Settlement Plan, and regretted that no progress was made at meeting in June 2000 held in London.

The mandate of MINURSO was extended on the expectation that would meet under the auspicies of the Secretary-General's Personal Envoy for further discussions to resolve the areas of disagreement. The Secretary-General was asked to provide an assessment of the situation before the end of MINURSO's mandate.

== See also ==
- Free Zone (region)
- History of Western Sahara
- Political status of Western Sahara
- List of United Nations Security Council Resolutions 1301 to 1400 (2000–2002)
- Sahrawi Arab Democratic Republic
- Moroccan Western Sahara Wall
