= United Nations Security Council Resolution 1301 =

UN Security Council Resolution 1301
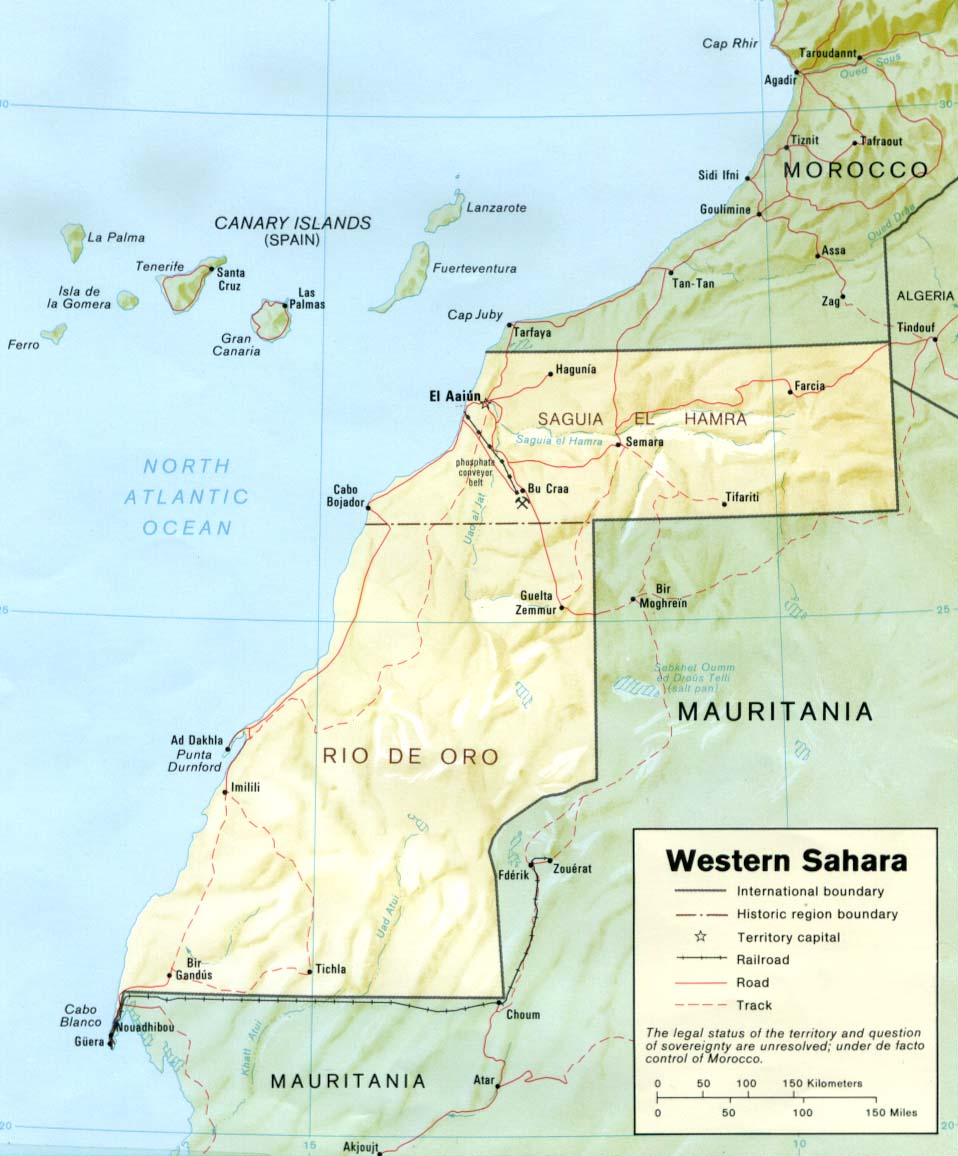
- Western Sahara
- Date: 31 May 2000
- Meeting no.: 4,149
- Code: S/RES/1301 (Document)
- Subject: The situation concerning Western Sahara
- Voting summary: 12 voted for; 1 voted against; 2 abstained
- Result: Adopted

Security Council composition
- Permanent members: China; France; Russia; United Kingdom; United States
- Non-permanent members: Argentina; Bangladesh; Canada; Jamaica; Malaysia; Mali; Namibia; Netherlands; Tunisia; Ukraine

United Nations Security Council resolution 1301, adopted on 31 May 2000, after recalling all previous resolutions on the question of the Western Sahara, in particular resolutions 1108 (1997) and 1292 (2000), the Council extended the mandate of the United Nations Mission for the Referendum in Western Sahara (MINURSO) until 31 July 2000.

The resolution began by welcoming efforts to sensitise United Nations personnel in peacekeeping operations in the prevention and control of HIV/AIDS and other diseases. The Council supported efforts by MINURSO to implement the Settlement Plan and agreements to hold a free and fair referendum on self-determination for the people of Western Sahara. Fundamental differences between Morocco and the Polisario Front had yet to be resolved.

MINURSO's mandate was extended on the condition that both parties would submit proposals to be agreed upon in order to resolve problems relating to the implementation of the settlement plan and an overall durable solution concerning the political status of Western Sahara. The Secretary-General Kofi Annan was requested to provide an assessment of the situation before 31 July 2000.

Resolution 1301, sponsored by France, Russia, the United Kingdom and United States, was adopted by 12 votes in favour and one against (Namibia) and two abstentions from Jamaica and Mali. Explaining their votes, the representative of Namibia said it could not support a departure from the provisions of the Settlement Plan and the inalienable right of the people to self-determination and independence, though it would support MINURSO's extension; the Jamaican representative stated that the resolution should have merely been technical as the referendum would not take place any time soon which the council had not addressed, and political considerations and other alternative proposals should have been left to a later resolution; and the representative of Mali supported the Settlement Plan and agreed that the referendum would not take place soon, but preferred the adoption of a Presidential Statement commending the Secretary-General's Personal Envoy.

== See also ==
- Free Zone (region)
- History of Western Sahara
- Legal status of Western Sahara
- List of United Nations Security Council Resolutions 1301 to 1400 (2000–2002)
- Sahrawi Arab Democratic Republic
- Wall (Western Sahara)
