= May 24 measures =

South Korean sanctions against North Korea

The May 24 measures, also called 5.24 (Korean: 5·24조치), are the sanctions imposed on May 24, 2010, by South Korea, against North Korea preventing economic relations with North Korea, implemented in response to the sinking of the ROKS Cheonan on 26 March 2010 that resulted in the death of 46 sailors. In October 2018, the South Korean government was considering lifting the May 24 measures against North Korea, though United States president Donald Trump expressed displeasure at the move.

== Background ==
After the ROKS Cheonan sinking on 26 March 2010, a South Korean investigation concluded that the ship had been sunk by North Korea using a torpedo.

The May 24 measures were intended to address North Korean responsibility for the sinking and to normalize the relationship between South and North Korea.

The main sanctions are:

- banning visits by South Koreans to North Korea
- halting all north–south trade
- prohibiting business expansion by South Koreans in the north
- halting all aid projects
- prohibiting North Korean ships from sailing in South Korean waters

== Reactions ==
The Democratic Party of Korea has argued that the May 24 measures prevent NK-SK relations from progressing.

On 25 May 2015, North Korean state media condemned the sanctions, saying "the May 24 step remains a cancer-like entity, blocking the improved relations between the north and the south, spoiling the national concord and unity and escalating the confrontation and tension."

On 24 May 2017, presidential special advisor Chung-in Moon suggested the measures could be removed, saying "In order for the newly launched administration to take the initiative in inter-Korean relations, it needs to recognize the limitations of the May 24 measures and to resolve these in a forward-looking manner."
