= Yono-class submarine =

North Korean Navy midget submarines

Class overview
- Name: Yono class
- Builders: Yukdaeso-ri Naval Shipyards
- Operators: Korean People's Navy Islamic Republic of Iran Navy
- Preceded by: Yugo class
- In service: 1965–present
- In commission: 10
- Building: 36
- Completed: 36
- Active: <36 (most in reserve)

General characteristics
- Type: Midget submarine
- Displacement: 120 tons submerged; 76–95 tons surfaced
- Length: 20–22 m (65 ft 7 in – 72 ft 2 in)
- Beam: 2.75 m (9 ft 0 in)
- Draught: 1.6 m (5 ft 3 in)
- Propulsion: Single-shaft MTU diesel engine with electric drive
- Speed: 10–11 knots (19–20 km/h; 12–13 mph) surfaced; 4–8 knots (7.4–14.8 km/h; 4.6–9.2 mph) submerged
- Range: 550 nmi (1,020 km; 630 mi) surfaced; 50 nmi (93 km; 58 mi) submerged
- Complement: 2 + 6 or 7 special forces personnel
- Armament: 2 × 533 mm (21 in) torpedo tubes; Mines

The Yono-class submarine is a class of North Korean midget submarines, produced for domestic use as well as for export. Also referred to as the Yeono class, these submarines displace 130 tons, significantly less than North Korea's larger 1,800-ton Romeo-class submarines. As of May 2010, North Korea is reported to operate ten of these submarines. North Korea has exported 14 submarines of Yono-class to Iran along established manufacturing facilities in the country.

== Design ==
The Yono-class submarine was first created in 1965.

== Combat involvement ==
A Yono-class submarine is thought to have fired the torpedo attack which sank a South Korean Pohang-class corvette, ROKS Cheonan on 26 March 2010 in South Korean waters. According to some investigators, the weapon used in the attack was a North Korean-manufactured CHT-02D torpedo, from which substantial propulsion parts were recovered. The device allegedly exploded not by contact, but by proximity 6 to 9 metres (20 to 30 ft) below Cheonan, creating a powerful pillar of water, called the bubble jet effect.

High ranking North Korean military officials denounced the international investigation and said the North does not have the type of submarines that supposedly carried out the attack. They also dismissed claims regarding writings on the torpedo and clarified that "when we put serial numbers on weapons, we engrave them with machines." South Korea's Yonhap News quoted South Korean officials as saying the North has about ten of the Yeono-class submarines.

A former staff member for the North Korean cabinet who defected to South Korea in 2011, said on 7 December 2012 that the crew of the North Korean submarine which sank Cheonan had been honored by the North Korean military and government. The defector, known by the alias "Ahn Cheol-nam", stated that the captain, co-captain, engineer, and boatswain of the mini-sub which sank Cheonan had been awarded "Hero of the DPRK" in October 2010.
