= Presidential Statement =

A Presidential Statement is often created when the United Nations Security Council cannot reach consensus or are prevented from passing a resolution by a permanent member's veto, or threat thereof. Such statements are similar in content, format, and tone to resolutions, but are not legally binding.

The adoption of a Presidential Statement requires consensus, although Security Council members may abstain. The Statement is signed by the sitting Security Council president.
