= United Nations Security Council Resolution 1292 =

UN Security Council Resolution 1292
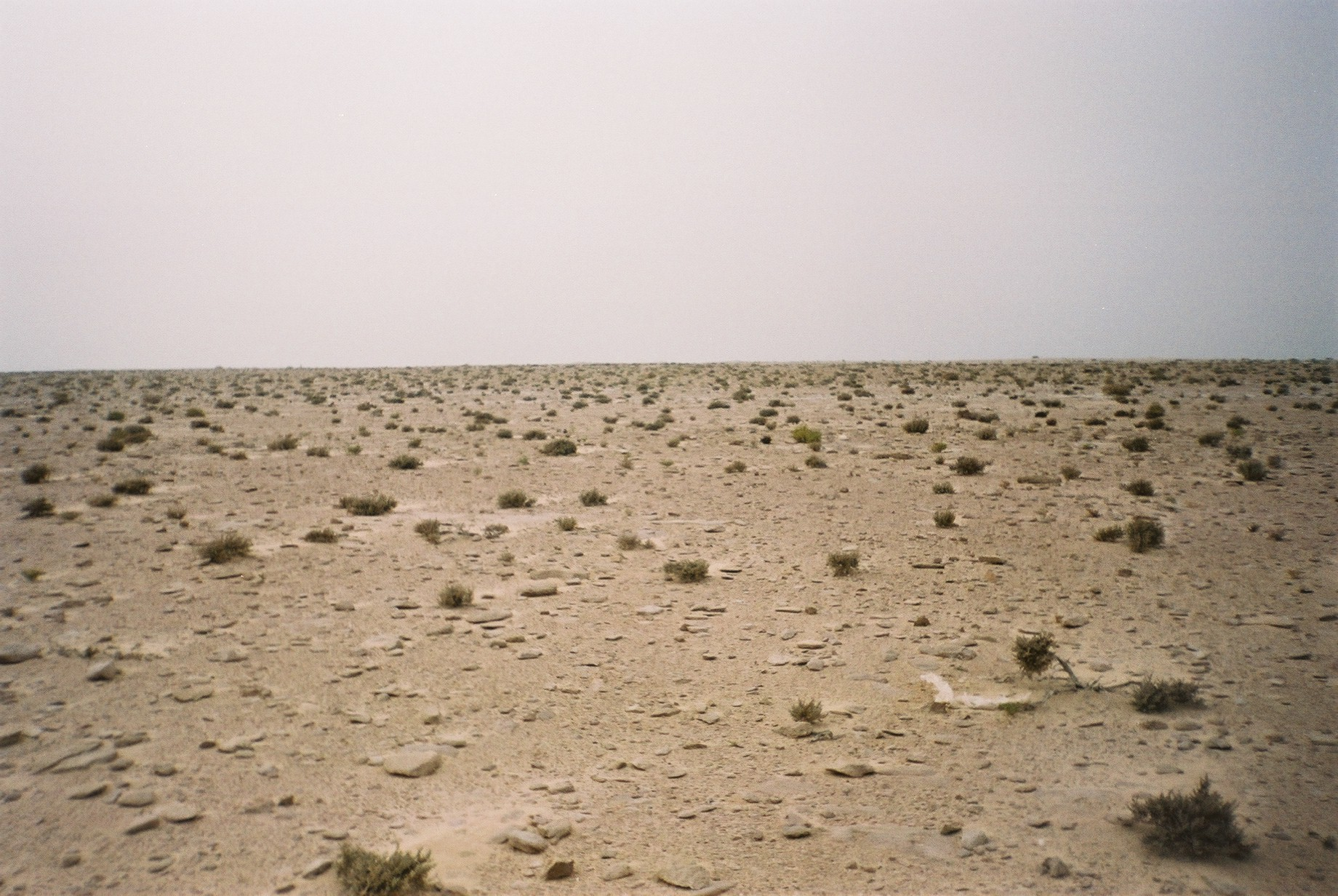
- Western Sahara desert
- Date: 29 February 2000
- Meeting no.: 4,106
- Code: S/RES/1292 (Document)
- Subject: The situation concerning Western Sahara
- Voting summary: 15 voted for; None voted against; None abstained
- Result: Adopted

Security Council composition
- Permanent members: China; France; Russia; United Kingdom; United States
- Non-permanent members: Argentina; Bangladesh; Canada; Jamaica; Malaysia; Mali; Namibia; Netherlands; Tunisia; Ukraine

United Nations Security Council resolution 1292, adopted unanimously on 29 February 2000, after recalling all previous resolutions on the question of the Western Sahara, in particular resolution 1108 (1997), the Council extended the mandate of the United Nations Mission for the Referendum in Western Sahara (MINURSO) until 31 May 2000.

The council recalled the provisions of the 1994 Convention on the Safety of United Nations and Associated Personnel and welcomed efforts to inform United Nations personnel with regard to the prevention and control of HIV/AIDS and other diseases in its peacekeeping operations. It reiterated its support for efforts to implement the Settlement Plan and agreements adopted by Morocco and the Polisario Front to hold a free and fair referendum on self-determination for the people of Western Sahara. At the same time, the council was concerned about a smooth implementation of the Settlement Plan, despite agreements and support of the international community.

The resolution extended MINURSO's mandate and supported ways to ensure an early and durable resolution of the dispute. Finally, the Secretary-General Kofi Annan was asked to provide an assessment of the situation before the present mandate ended on 31 May 2000.

== See also ==
- Free Zone (region)
- History of Western Sahara
- Legal status of Western Sahara
- List of United Nations Security Council Resolutions 1201 to 1300 (1998–2000)
- Sahrawi Arab Democratic Republic
- Wall (Western Sahara)
