= United Nations Security Council Resolution 1108 =

UN Security Council Resolution 1108
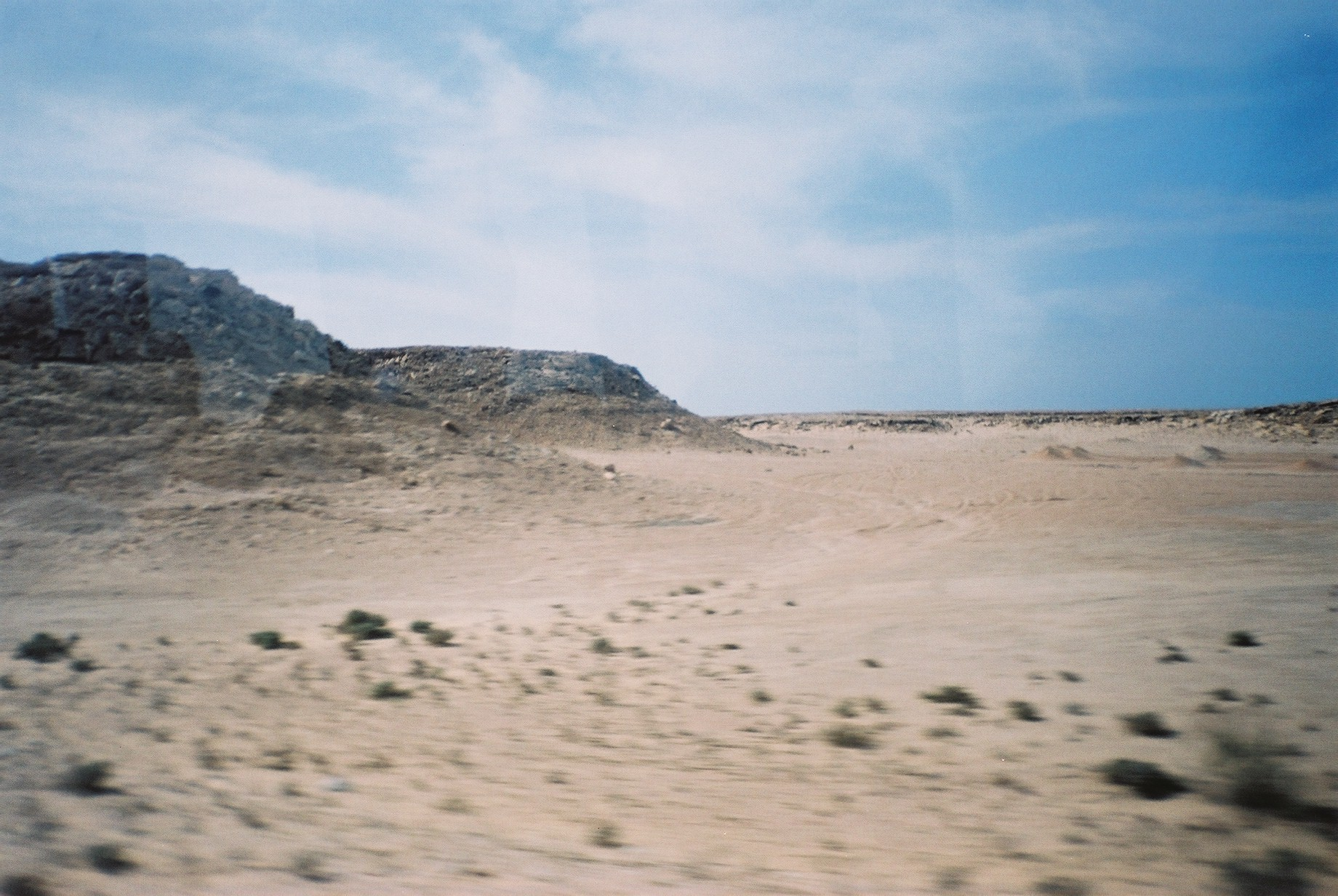
- Western Sahara desert
- Date: 22 May 1997
- Meeting no.: 3,779
- Code: S/RES/1108 (Document)
- Subject: The situation concerning Western Sahara
- Voting summary: 15 voted for; None voted against; None abstained
- Result: Adopted

Security Council composition
- Permanent members: China; France; Russia; United Kingdom; United States
- Non-permanent members: Chile; Costa Rica; Egypt; Guinea-Bissau; Japan; Kenya; South Korea; Poland; Portugal; Sweden

United Nations Security Council resolution 1108, adopted unanimously on 22 May 1997, after reaffirming all previous resolutions on the Western Sahara, the Council extended the mandate of the United Nations Mission for the Referendum in Western Sahara (MINURSO) until 30 September 1997.

The security council welcomed the intention of the Secretary-General Kofi Annan to evaluate the situation in Western Sahara based on recommendations by the designated Personal Envoy. It reiterated its commitment to the holding of a free and fair referendum for the self-determination of the people of Western Sahara in accordance with the Settlement Plan.

By extending the mandate until 30 September 1997, the resolution urged both parties to co-operate with James A. Baker III, the Personal Envoy of the Secretary-General and demonstrate political will to resolve the stalemate in the dispute between Morocco and the Polisario Front. The Personal Envoy was tasked with mandate to recommend whether the Settlement Plan could be implemented in its present form, whether mutually acceptable adjustments could be made or whether another way of resolving the conflict could be found. Finally, the Secretary-General was required to submit a report by 15 September 1997 to the council with his evaluations on all aspects of the situation in Western Sahara.

== See also ==
- History of Western Sahara
- List of United Nations Security Council Resolutions 1101 to 1200 (1997–1998)
- Sahrawi Arab Democratic Republic
- Wall (Western Sahara)
