= United Nations Security Council resolution =

UN resolution adopted by the 15 members of the Security Council

A United Nations Security Council resolution (UNSCR) is a resolution adopted by the Security Council of the United Nations (UNSC), the 15-member United Nations body charged with "primary responsibility for the maintenance of international peace and security" under the United Nations Charter.

The UN Charter specifies, in Article 27, that decisions of the Security Council shall be made by an affirmative vote of nine members, out of the 15 members of the Security Council. With the exception of purely procedural decisions, all other resolutions adopted by the Security Council can be vetoed by any of the five permanent members. The five permanent members are the People's Republic of China (which replaced the Republic of China in 1971), France, Russia (which replaced the defunct Soviet Union in 1991), the United Kingdom, and the United States.

Article 25 of the UN Charter stipulates that "The Members of the United Nations agree to accept and carry out the decisions of the Security Council in accordance with the present Charter".

As of 13 November 2026, the Security Council has passed 2838 resolutions.

== Terms and functions mentioned in the UN Charter ==
The term "resolution" does not appear in the text of the United Nations Charter, which instead uses different formulations, such as "decision" and "recommendation".

The UN Charter authorizes the Security Council to take action on behalf of all members of the United Nations, and to make decisions and recommendations. The International Court of Justice (ICJ) advisory opinion in the 1949 "Reparations" case indicated that the United Nations, as an Organization, had both explicit and implied powers. The Court cited Articles 104 and 2(5) of the Charter, and noted that the members had granted the Organization the necessary legal authority to exercise its functions and fulfill its purposes as specified or implied in the Charter, and that they had agreed to give the United Nations every assistance in any action taken in accordance with the Charter.

Under Article 25 of the Charter, UN member states are bound to carry out "decisions of the Security Council in accordance with the present Charter".

In 1971, the ICJ – also called the "World Court", the highest court dealing with international law – asserted in an advisory opinion on the question of Namibia that all UN Security Council resolutions are legally binding. Some voices, however, defend that a difference should be made between United Nations Security Council resolutions adopted under "Chapter VII" of the UN Charter, which are legally binding, and those adopted under "Chapter VI" of the UN Charter, which are non binding; in practice, however, United Nations Security Council resolutions seldom explicit whether they are being adopted based on Chapter VI or VII of the UN Charter.

The Repertory of Practice of United Nations Organs, a UN legal publication, says that during the United Nations Conference on International Organization which met in San Francisco in 1945, attempts to limit obligations of Members under Article 25 of the Charter to those decisions taken by the Council in the exercise of its specific powers under Chapters VI, VII and VIII of the Charter failed. It was stated at the time that those obligations also flowed from the authority conferred on the Council under Article 24(1) to act on the behalf of the members while exercising its responsibility for the maintenance of international peace and security. Article 24, interpreted in this sense, becomes a source of authority which can be drawn upon to meet situations which are not covered by the more detailed provisions in the succeeding articles. The Repertory on Article 24 says: "The question whether Article 24 confers general powers on the Security Council ceased to be a subject of discussion following the advisory opinion of the International Court of Justice rendered on 21 June 1971 in connection with the question of Namibia (ICJ Reports, 1971, page 16)".

In exercising its powers the Security Council seldom bothers to cite the particular article or articles of the UN Charter that its decisions are based upon. In cases where none are mentioned, a constitutional interpretation is required. This sometimes presents ambiguities as to what amounts to a "decision" as opposed to a "recommendation".

If the Security Council cannot reach consensus or a passing vote on a resolution, its members may choose to produce a non-binding presidential statement instead of a Resolution. These are adopted by consensus. They are meant to apply political pressure—a warning that the Council is paying attention and further action may follow.

Press statements typically accompany both resolutions and presidential statements, carrying the text of the document adopted by the body and also some explanatory text. They may also be released independently, after a significant meeting.

== See also ==
- United Nations Security Council resolutions by topic
- United Nations Security Council resolutions by year
- United Nations General Assembly resolution
- List of vetoed United Nations Security Council resolutions
