= List of United Nations Security Council Resolutions 2601 to 2700 =

This is a list of United Nations Security Council Resolutions 2601 to 2700 adopted between 29 October 2021 and 19 October 2023.

| Resolution | Date | Vote | Concerns |
|---|---|---|---|
| 2601 | 29 October 2021 | 15–0–0 | Protection of education in armed conflict |
| 2602 | 29 October 2021 | 13–0–2 (abstentions: Russian Federation and Tunisia) | The situation concerning Western Sahara |
| 2603 | 29 October 2021 | 15–0–0 | Extends Mandate of the United Nations Verification Mission in Colombia |
| 2604 | 3 November 2021 | 15–0–0 | The situation in Bosnia and Herzegovina |
| 2605 | 12 November 2021 | 13–0–2 (abstentions: China and Russian Federation) | The situation in the Central African Republic |
| 2606 | 15 November 2021 | 15–0–0 | Reports of the Secretary-General on the Sudan and South Sudan |
| 2607 | 15 November 2021 | 13–0–2 (abstentions: China and Russian Federation) | The situation in Somalia |
| 2608 | 3 December 2021 | 15–0–0 | The situation in Somalia |
| 2609 | 15 December 2021 | 15–0–0 | Reports of the Secretary-General on the Sudan and South Sudan |
| 2610 | 17 December 2021 | 15–0–0 | Threats to international peace and security caused by terrorist acts |
| 2611 | 17 December 2021 | 15–0–0 | Threats to international peace and security caused by terrorist acts |
| 2612 | 20 December 2021 | 15–0–0 | The situation concerning the Democratic Republic of the Congo |
| 2613 | 21 December 2021 | 15–0–0 | The situation in the Middle East |
| 2614 | 21 December 2021 | 15–0–0 | The situation in Somalia |
| 2615 | 22 December 2021 | 15–0–0 | Threats to international peace and security caused by terrorist acts |
| 2616 | 22 December 2021 | 12–0–3 (abstentions: China, India, and Russian Federation) | Maintenance of international peace and security |
| 2617 | 30 December 2021 | 15–0–0 | Threats to international peace and security caused by terrorist acts |
| 2618 | 27 January 2022 | 15–0–0 | The situation in Cyprus |
| 2619 | 31 January 2022 | 15–0–0 | The situation in Libya |
| 2620 | 15 February 2022 | 15–0–0 | Reports of the Secretary-General on the Sudan and South Sudan |
| 2621 | 22 February 2022 | 15–0–0 | The situation between Iraq and Kuwait |
| 2622 | 25 February 2022 | 15–0–0 | Non-proliferation of weapons of mass destruction |
| 2623 | 27 February 2022 | 11–1–3 (against: Russian Federation; abstentions: China, India, and United Arab Emirates) | Emergency Special Session of the General Assembly on Ukraine |
| 2624 | 28 February 2022 | 11–0–4 (abstentions: Brazil, Ireland, Mexico, and Norway) | The situation in Yemen |
| 2625 | 15 March 2022 | 13–0–2 (abstentions: China and Russian Federation) | Reports of the Secretary-General on the Sudan and South Sudan |
| 2626 | 17 March 2022 | 14–0–1 (abstention: Russian Federation) | The situation in Afghanistan |
| 2627 | 25 March 2022 | 15–0–0 | Non-proliferation/Democratic People's Republic of Korea |
| 2628 | 31 March 2022 | 15–0–0 | The situation in Somalia |
| 2629 | 29 April 2022 | 15–0–0 | The situation in Libya |
| 2630 | 12 May 2022 | 15–0–0 | Reports of the Secretary-General on the Sudan and South Sudan |
| 2631 | 26 May 2022 | 15–0–0 | The situation concerning Iraq |
| 2632 | 26 May 2022 | 15–0–0 | The situation in Somalia |
| 2633 | 26 May 2022 | 10–0–5 (abstentions: China, Gabon, India, Kenya, and Russian Federation) | Reports of the Secretary-General on the Sudan and South Sudan |
| 2634 | 31 May 2022 | 15–0–0 | Maritime security and combating piracy in the Gulf of Guinea |
| 2635 | 3 June 2022 | 14–0–1 (abstention: Russian Federation) | The situation in Libya |
| 2636 | 3 June 2022 | 15–0–0 | Reports of the Secretary-General on the Sudan and South Sudan |
| 2637 | 22 June 2022 | 14–0–1 (abstention: Russian Federation) | International Residual Mechanism for Criminal Tribunals |
| 2638 | 22 June 2022 | Adopted without vote | Death of Antônio Augusto Cançado Trindade and election to the International Court of Justice |
| 2639 | 27 June 2022 | 15–0–0 | The situation in the Middle East |
| 2640 | 29 June 2022 | 13–0–2 (abstentions: China and Russian Federation) | The situation in Mali |
| 2641 | 30 June 2022 | 10–0–5 (abstentions: China, Gabon, Ghana, Kenya, and Russian Federation) | The situation concerning the Democratic Republic of the Congo |
| 2642 | 12 July 2022 | 12–0–3 (abstentions: France, United Kingdom, and United States) | The situation in Syria |
| 2643 | 13 July 2022 | 15–0–0 | The situation in Yemen |
| 2644 | 13 July 2022 | 15–0–0 | The situation in Libya |
| 2645 | 15 July 2022 | 15–0–0 | The question concerning Haiti |
| 2646 | 28 July 2022 | 15–0–0 | The situation in Cyprus |
| 2647 | 28 July 2022 | 12–0–3 (abstentions: Gabon, Ghana, and Kenya) | The situation in Libya |
| 2648 | 29 July 2022 | 10–0–5 (abstentions: China, Gabon, Ghana, Kenya, and Russian Federation) | The situation in the Central African Republic |
| 2649 | 30 August 2022 | 15–0–0 | The situation in Mali |
| 2650 | 31 August 2022 | 15–0–0 | The situation in Lebanon |
| 2651 | 15 September 2022 | 15–0–0 | Threats to international peace and security |
| 2652 | 29 September 2022 | 15–0–0 | Maintenance of international peace and security |
| 2653 | 21 October 2022 | 15–0–0 | The question concerning Haiti |
| 2654 | 27 October 2022 | 13–0–2 (abstentions: Kenya and Russian Federation) | The situation concerning Western Sahara |
| 2655 | 27 October 2022 | 15–0–0 | Extends Mandate of the United Nations Verification Mission in Colombia |
| 2656 | 28 October 2022 | 15–0–0 | The situation in Libya |
| 2657 | 31 October 2022 | 14–0–1 (abstention: China) | The situation in Somalia |
| 2658 | 2 November 2022 | 15–0–0 | The situation in Bosnia and Herzegovina |
| 2659 | 14 November 2022 | 12–0–3 (abstentions: China, Gabon, and Russian Federation) | The situation in the Central African Republic |
| 2660 | 14 November 2022 | 15–0–0 | Reports of the Secretary-General on the Sudan and South Sudan |
| 2661 | 15 November 2022 | 15–0–0 | The situation in Somalia |
| 2662 | 17 November 2022 | 11–0–4 (abstentions: China, Gabon, Ghana, and Russian Federation) | The situation in Somalia |
| 2663 | 30 November 2022 | 15–0–0 | Non-proliferation of weapons of mass destruction |
| 2664 | 9 December 2022 | 14–0–1 (abstention: India) | General issues relating to sanctions |
| 2665 | 16 December 2022 | 15–0–0 | Threats to international peace and security caused by terrorist acts |
| 2666 | 20 December 2022 | 15–0–0 | The situation concerning the Democratic Republic of the Congo |
| 2667 | 20 December 2022 | 15–0–0 | The situation concerning the Democratic Republic of the Congo |
| 2668 | 21 December 2022 | 15–0–0 | United Nations peacekeeping operations |
| 2669 | 21 December 2022 | 12–0–3 (abstentions: China, India, and Russian Federation) | The situation in Myanmar |
| 2670 | 21 December 2022 | 15–0–0 | The situation in Somalia |
| 2671 | 22 December 2022 | 15–0–0 | The situation in the Middle East |
| 2672 | 9 January 2023 | 15–0–0 | The situation in Syria |
| 2673 | 11 January 2023 | 15–0–0 | Extends Mandate of the United Nations Verification Mission in Colombia |
| 2674 | 30 January 2023 | 15–0–0 | The situation in Cyprus |
| 2675 | 15 February 2023 | 15–0–0 | The situation in Yemen |
| 2676 | 8 March 2023 | 13–0–2 (abstentions: China and Russian Federation) | Reports of the Secretary-General on the Sudan and South Sudan |
| 2677 | 15 March 2023 | 13–0–2 (abstentions: China and Russian Federation) | Reports of the Secretary-General on the Sudan and South Sudan |
| 2678 | 16 March 2023 | 15–0–0 | The situation in Afghanistan |
| 2679 | 16 March 2023 | 15–0–0 | The situation in Afghanistan |
| 2680 | 23 March 2023 | 15–0–0 | Non-proliferation/Democratic People's Republic of Korea |
| 2681 | 27 April 2023 | 15–0–0 | The situation in Afghanistan |
| 2682 | 30 May 2023 | 15–0–0 | The situation concerning Iraq |
| 2683 | 30 May 2023 | 10–0–5 (abstentions: China, Gabon, Ghana, Mozambique, and Russian Federation) | Reports of the Secretary-General on the Sudan and South Sudan |
| 2684 | 2 June 2023 | 14–0–1 (abstention: Russian Federation) | The situation in Libya |
| 2685 | 2 June 2023 | 15–0–0 | Reports of the Secretary-General on the Sudan and South Sudan |
| 2686 | 14 June 2023 | 15–0–0 | Maintenance of international peace and security |
| 2687 | 27 June 2023 | 15–0–0 | The situation in Somalia |
| 2688 | 27 June 2023 | 15–0–0 | The situation concerning the Democratic Republic of the Congo |
| 2689 | 29 June 2023 | 15–0–0 | The situation in the Middle East |
| 2690 | 30 June 2023 | 15–0–0 | The situation in Mali |
| 2691 | 10 July 2023 | 15–0–0 | The situation in Yemen |
| 2692 | 14 July 2023 | 15–0–0 | The question concerning Haiti |
| 2693 | 27 July 2023 | 13–0–2 (abstentions: China and Russian Federation) | The situation in the Central African Republic |
| 2694 | 2 August 2023 | 15–0–0 | Extends Mandate of the United Nations Verification Mission in Colombia |
| 2695 | 31 August 2023 | 13–0–2 (abstentions: China and Russian Federation) | The situation in Lebanon |
| 2696 | 7 September 2023 | 15–0–0 | The situation in Somalia |
| 2697 | 15 September 2023 | 15–0–0 | Threats to international peace and security |
| 2698 | 29 September 2023 | 14–0–1 (abstention: Russian Federation) | Maintenance of international peace and security |
| 2699 | 2 October 2023 | 13–0–2 (abstentions: China and Russian Federation) | The question concerning Haiti |
| 2700 | 19 October 2023 | 15–0–0 | The question concerning Haiti |

== See also ==
- Lists of United Nations Security Council resolutions
- List of United Nations Security Council Resolutions 2501 to 2600
- List of United Nations Security Council Resolutions 2701 to 2800
