= United Nations Security Council Resolution 2695 =

United Nations Security Council Resolution

UN Security Council Resolution 2695
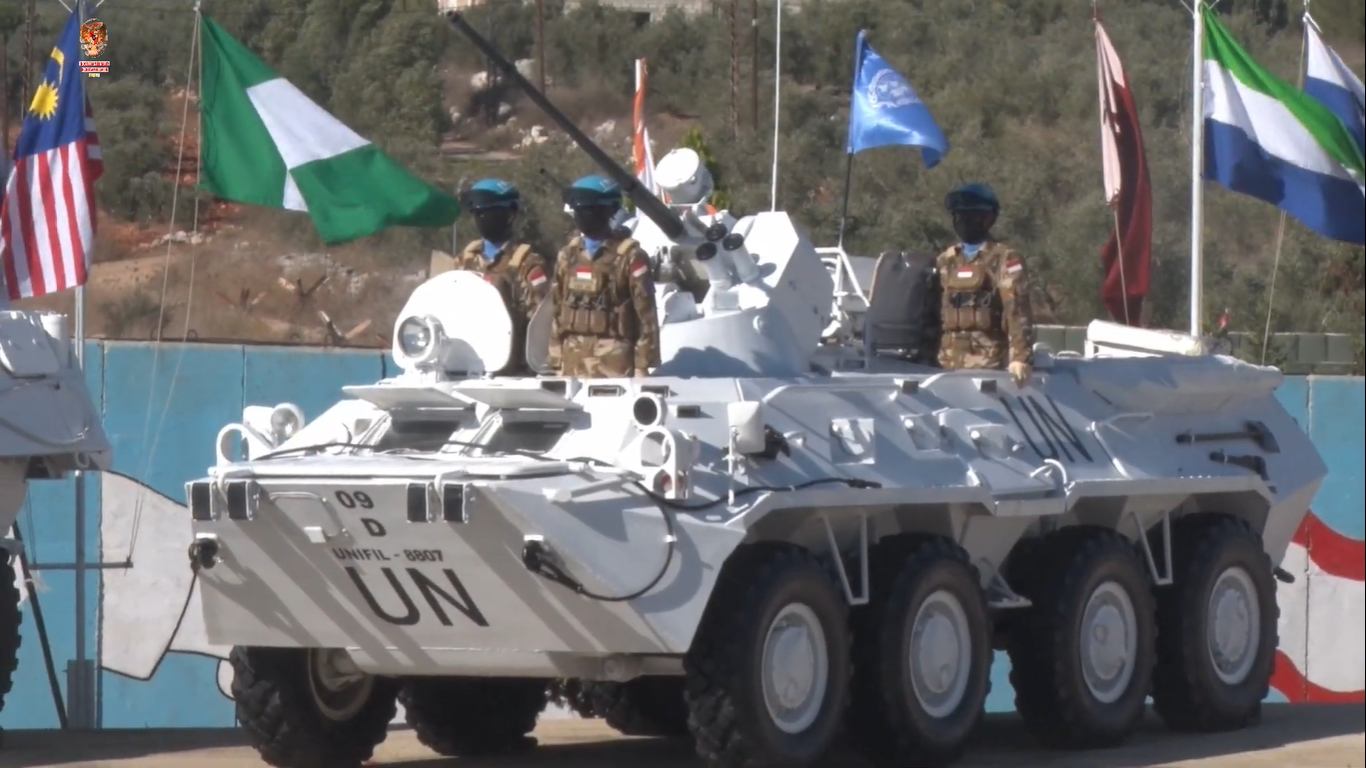
- UNIFIL forces in Lebanon
- Date: 31 August 2023
- Meeting no.: 9,409
- Code: S/RES/2695 (Document)
- Subject: The situation in Lebanon
- Voting summary: 13 voted for; None voted against; 2 abstained
- Result: Adopted

Security Council composition
- Permanent members: China; France; Russia; United Kingdom; United States
- Non-permanent members: Albania; Brazil; Ecuador; Gabon; Ghana; Japan; Malta; Mozambique; Switzerland; United Arab Emirates

United Nations Security Council Resolution 2695 was adopted on 31 August 2023. According to the resolution, the Security Council voted to extend the mandate of United Nations Interim Force in Lebanon (UNIFIL) until 31 August 2024.

Thirteen members of the Council voted in favor, while China and Russia abstained.

== See also ==
- List of United Nations Security Council Resolutions 2601 to 2700 (2021–2023)
- United Nations Security Council Resolution 1701
