= United Nations Security Council Resolution 2638 =

UN Security Council Resolution 2638
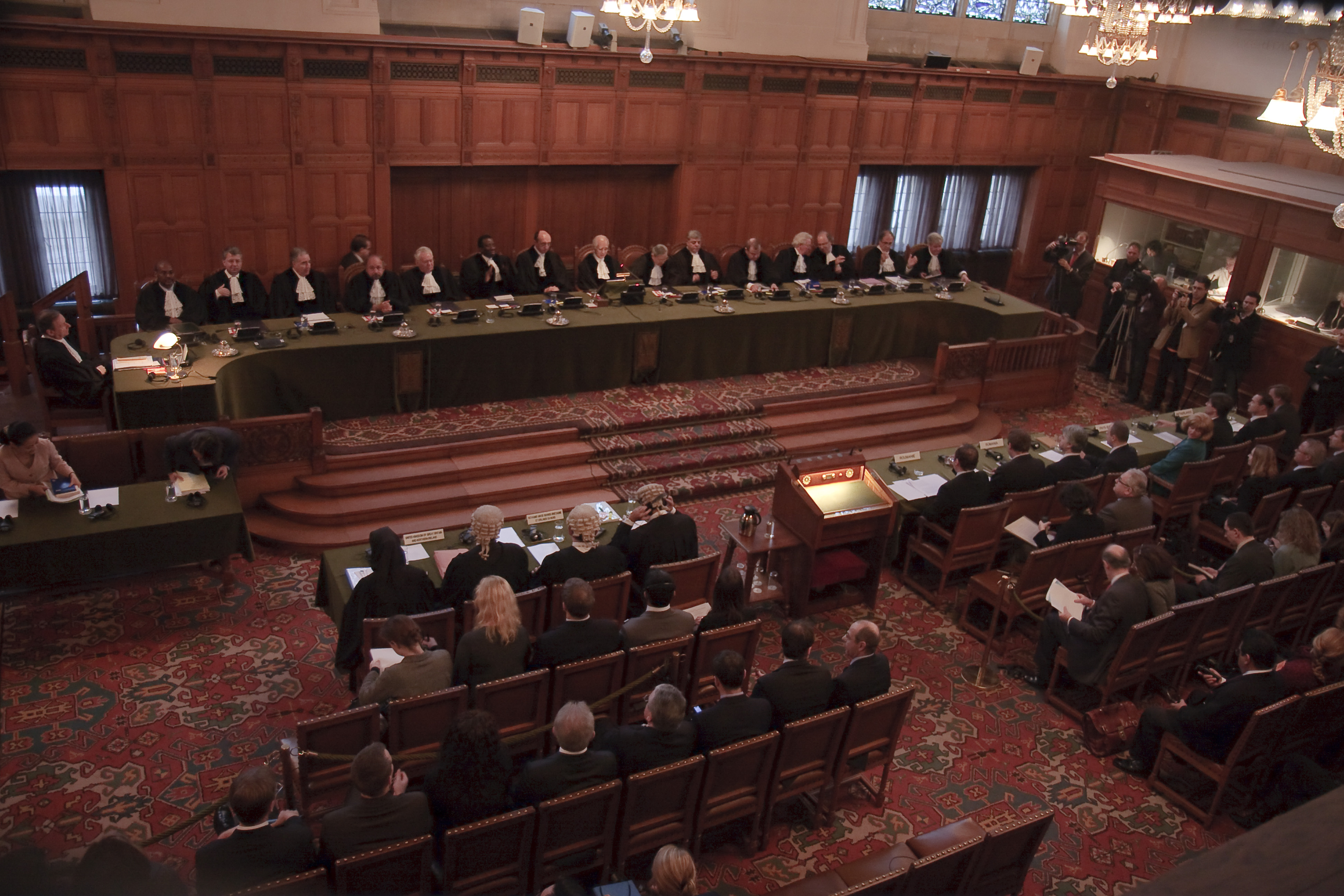
- ICJ judges during a hearing
- Date: 22 June 2022
- Meeting no.: 9073
- Code: S/RES/2638 (Document)
- Subject: International Court of Justice
- Result: Adopted without vote

Security Council composition
- Permanent members: China; France; Russia; United Kingdom; United States
- Non-permanent members: Albania; Brazil; Gabon; Ghana; India; Ireland; Kenya; Mexico; Norway; United Arab Emirates

United Nations Security Council resolution 2638 was adopted without vote on 22 June 2022. After noting with regret the death of International Court of Justice (ICJ) judge Antônio Augusto Cançado Trindade on 29 May 2022, the Council decided that elections to the vacancy on the ICJ would take place on 4 November 2022 at the Security Council and at a meeting of the General Assembly during its 77th session.

Cançado Trindade, a Brazilian jurist and former judge of the Inter-American Court of Human Rights, was a member of the ICJ since 2009. His term of office was due to expire in February 2026.

== See also ==
- Judges of the International Court of Justice
- List of United Nations Security Council Resolutions 2601 to 2700 (2021–2023)
