= United Nations Security Council Resolution 2687 =

United Nations Security Council Resolution

UN Security Council Resolution 2687
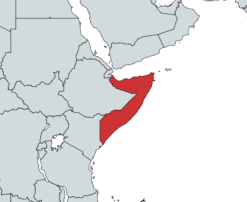
- Map of Somalia
- Date: 27 June 2023
- Meeting no.: 9,359
- Code: S/RES/2687 (Document)
- Subject: The situation in Somalia
- Voting summary: 15 voted for; None voted against; None abstained
- Result: Adopted

Security Council composition
- Permanent members: China; France; Russia; United Kingdom; United States
- Non-permanent members: Albania; Brazil; Ecuador; Gabon; Ghana; Japan; Malta; Mozambique; Switzerland; United Arab Emirates

United Nations Security Council Resolution 2687 was adopted on 27 June 2023. In the resolution, the Security Council voted to extend authorization for the African Union Transition Mission in Somalia (ATMIS) until 31 December 2023.

The resolution allows the first phase of drawdown by 2,000 ATMIS troops by 30 September 2023 and second phase of drawdown by 3,000 ATMIS troops until 31 December 2023.

== See also ==
- List of United Nations Security Council Resolutions 2601 to 2700 (2021–2023)
