= United Nations Security Council Resolution 2676 =

United Nations Security Council Resolution

UN Security Council Resolution 2676
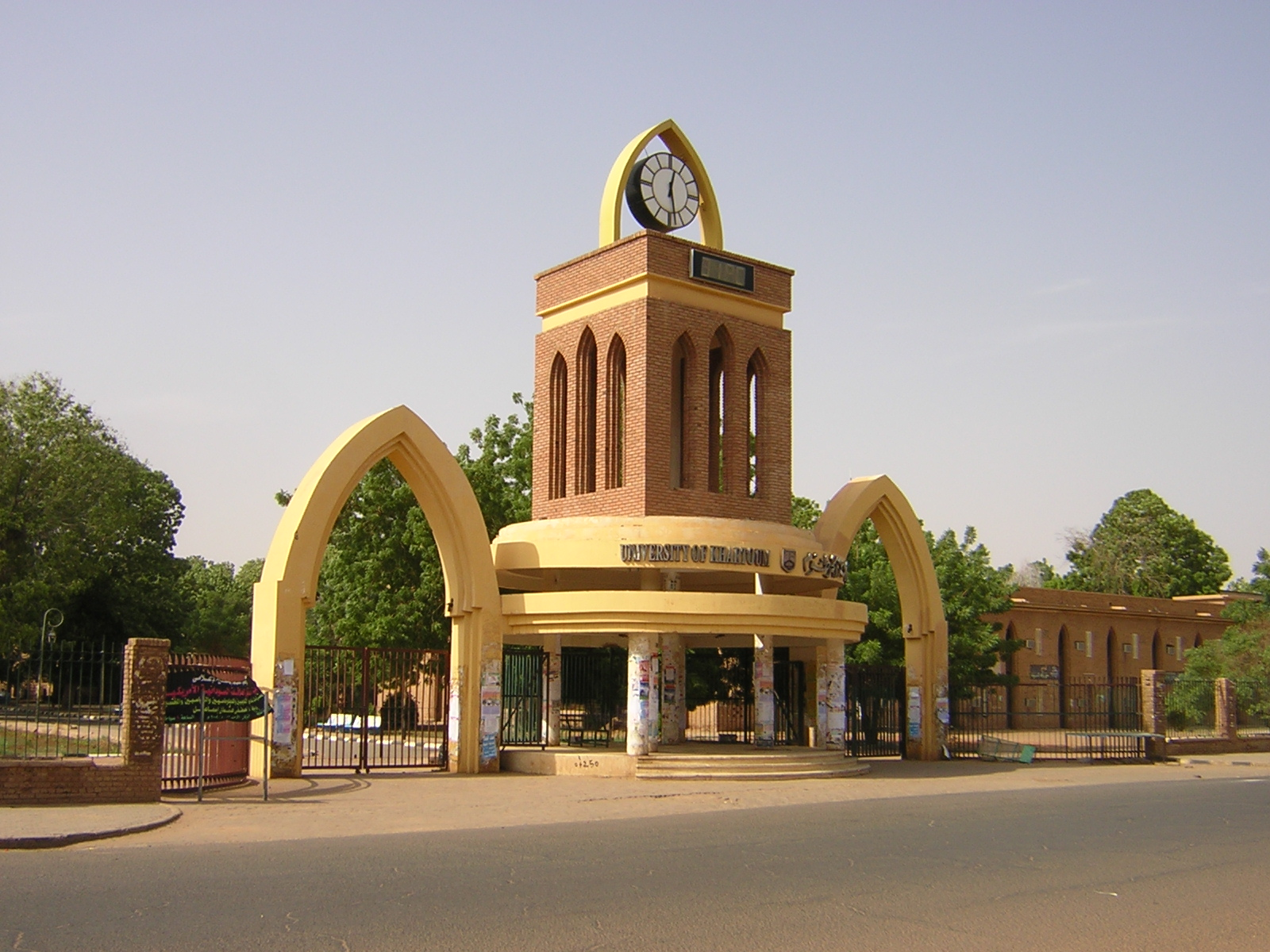
- University of Khartoum
- Date: 8 March 2023
- Meeting no.: 9,278
- Code: S/RES/2676 (Document)
- Subject: Reports of the Secretary-General on the Sudan and South Sudan
- Voting summary: 13 voted for; None voted against; 2 abstained
- Result: Adopted

Security Council composition
- Permanent members: China; France; Russia; United Kingdom; United States
- Non-permanent members: Albania; Brazil; Ecuador; Gabon; Ghana; Japan; Malta; Mozambique; Switzerland; United Arab Emirates

United Nations Security Council Resolution 2676 was adopted on 8 March 2023. According to the resolution, the United Nations Security Council voted to renew the mandate of Panel of Experts monitoring the Sudan sanctions regime until 12 March 2024

China and Russia abstained from voting.

== See also ==
- List of United Nations Security Council Resolutions 2601 to 2700 (2021–2023)
