= United Nations Security Council Resolution 2650 =

UN Security Council Resolution 2650
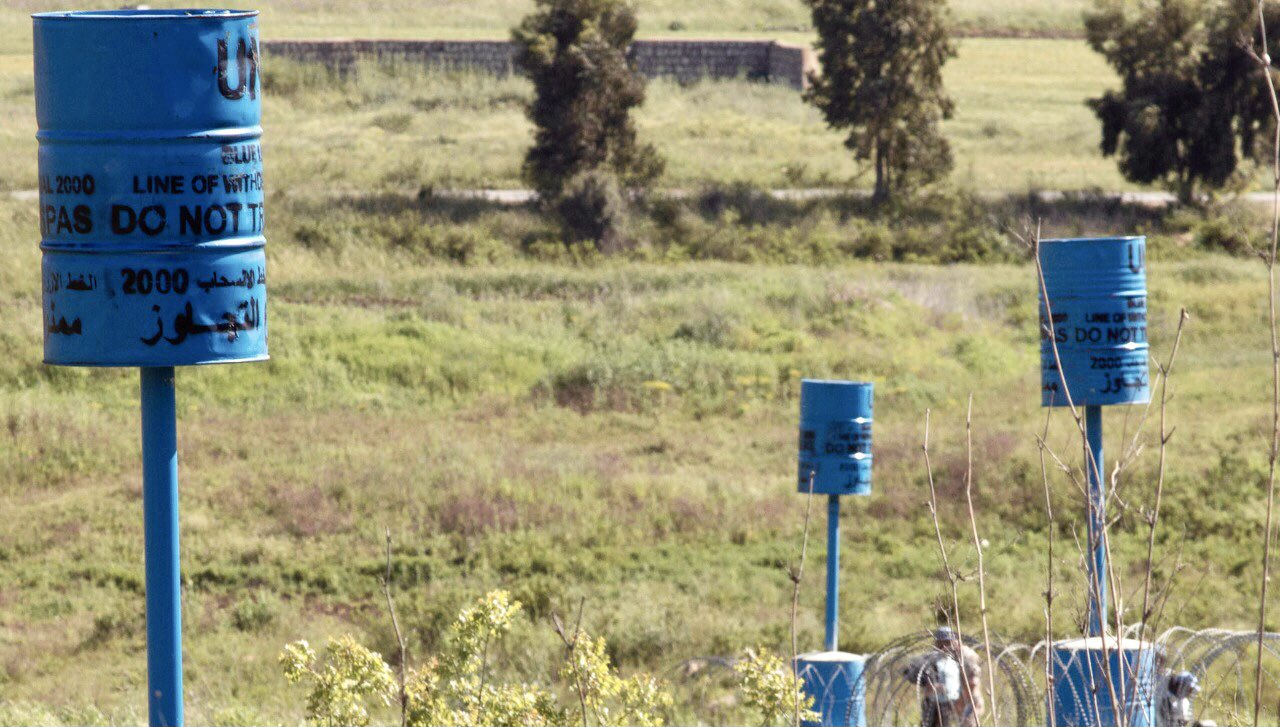
- Withdrawal line of Israeli and Lebanese armed forces
- Date: 31 August 2022
- Meeting no.: 9121
- Code: S/RES/2650 (Document)
- Subject: Extending through 31 August 2023 the United Nations Interim Force in Lebanon
- Voting summary: 15 voted for; None voted against; None abstained
- Result: Adopted

Security Council composition
- Permanent members: China; France; Russia; United Kingdom; United States
- Non-permanent members: Albania; Brazil; Gabon; Ghana; India; Ireland; Kenya; Mexico; Norway; United Arab Emirates

United Nations Security Council Resolution 2650 was passed by a unanimous vote on 31 August 2022, which extended through 31 August 2023 the United Nations Interim Force in Lebanon. This was done so at the request of the third Cabinet of Najib Mikati as the current Government of Lebanon.

== See also ==
- List of United Nations Security Council Resolutions 2601 to 2700 (2021–2023)
