= United Nations Security Council Resolution 2617 =

UN Security Council Resolution 2617
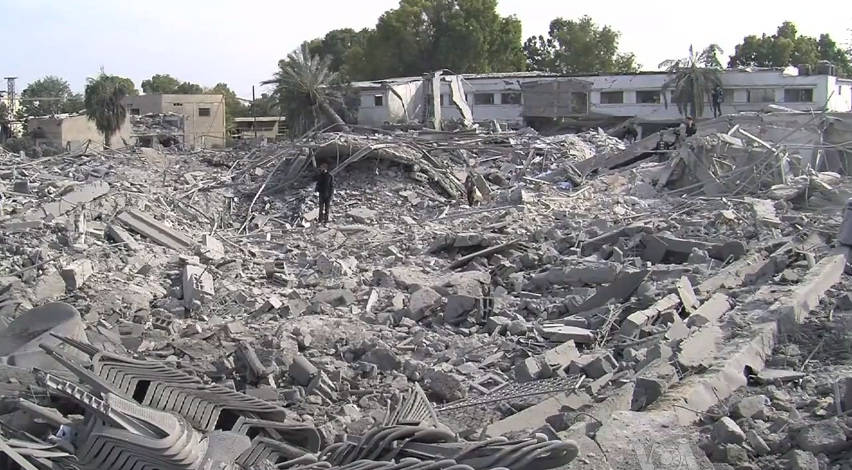
- Destruction in Gaza
- Date: 30 December 2021
- Code: S/RES/2617 (Document)
- Subject: Renewing the mandate of the Counter-Terrorism Committee Executive Directorate (CTED), the expert body that supports the United Nations counter-terrorism architecture until 31 December 2025, with an interim review slated to be conducted in December 2023.
- Voting summary: 15 voted for; None voted against; None abstained
- Result: Adopted

Security Council composition
- Permanent members: China; France; Russia; United Kingdom; United States
- Non-permanent members: Estonia; India; Ireland; Kenya; Mexico; Niger; Norway; St.Vincent–Grenadines; Tunisia; Vietnam

United Nations Security Council Resolution 2617 was passed by a unanimous vote on 30 December 2021. It renewed the mandate of the Counter-Terrorism Committee Executive Directorate (CTED), the expert body that supports the United Nations counter-terrorism architecture until 31 December 2025, with an interim review slated to be conducted in December 2023.

== See also ==
- United Nations Security Council Counter-Terrorism Committee
- List of United Nations Security Council Resolutions 2601 to 2700 (2021–2023)
