= United Nations Security Council Resolution 2647 =

United Nations Security Council Resolution

UN Security Council Resolution 2647
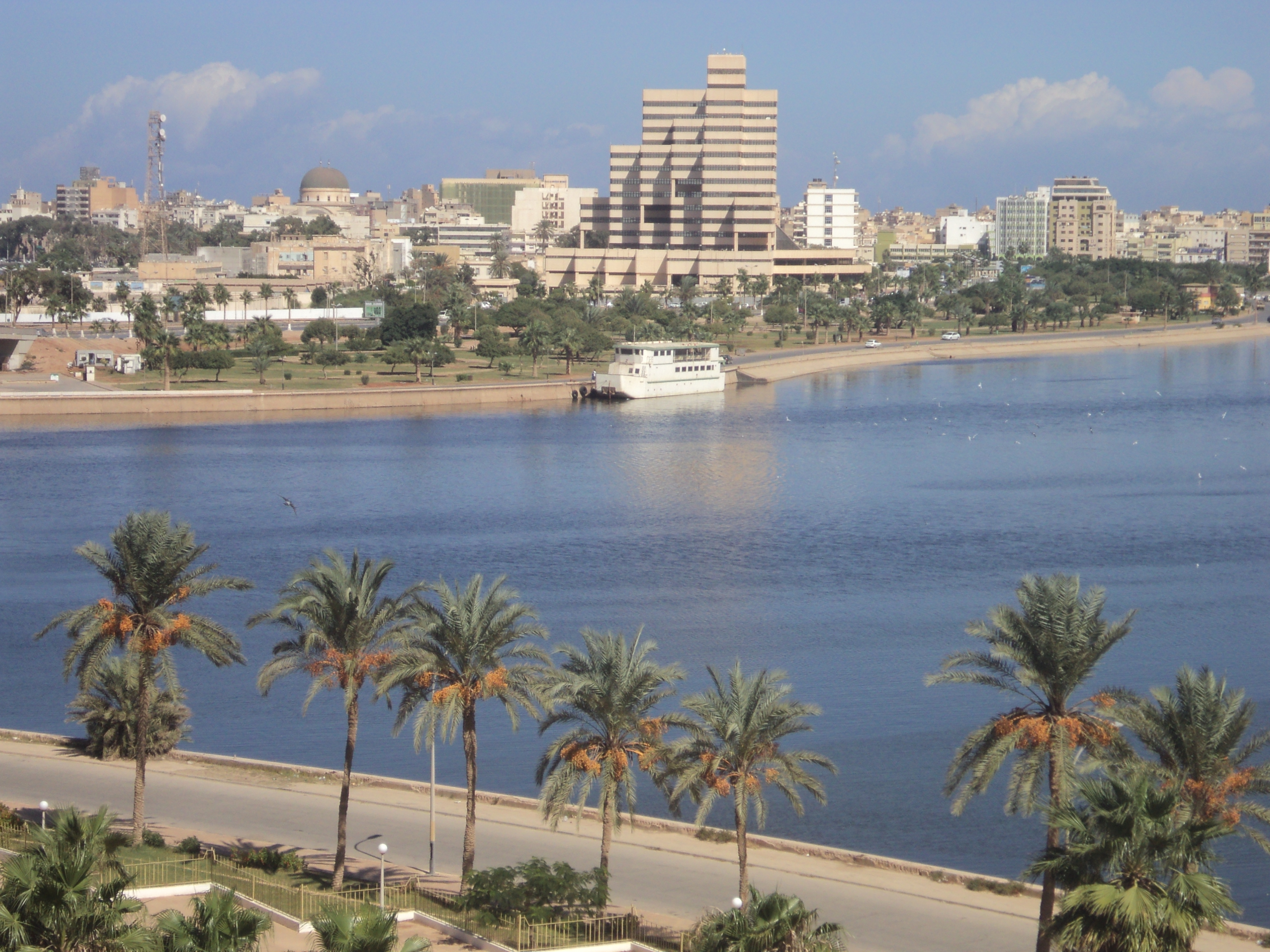
- Benghazi seafront
- Date: 28 July 2022
- Meeting no.: 9,103
- Code: S/RES/2647 (Document)
- Subject: The situation in Libya
- Voting summary: 12 voted for; None voted against; 3 abstained
- Result: Adopted

Security Council composition
- Permanent members: China; France; Russia; United Kingdom; United States
- Non-permanent members: Albania; Brazil; Gabon; Ghana; India; Ireland; Kenya; Mexico; Norway; United Arab Emirates

United Nations Security Council Resolution 2647 was adopted on 28 July 2022. In the resolution, the Security Council voted to extend the mandate of United Nations Support Mission in Libya (UNSMIL) until 31 October 2022.

Gabon, Ghana and Kenya abstained from the vote.

== Voting ==
Approved (12)	Abstained (3)	Opposed (0)
Albania; Brazil; **China**; **France**; India; Ireland; Mexico; Norway; **Russia**; United Arab Emirates; **United Kingdom**; **United States**	Gabon; Ghana; Kenya	

- Permanent members of the Security Council are in bold.

== See also ==
- List of United Nations Security Council Resolutions 2601 to 2700 (2021–2023)
