= United Nations Security Council Resolution 2669 =

United Nations Security Council Resolution

UN Security Council Resolution 2669
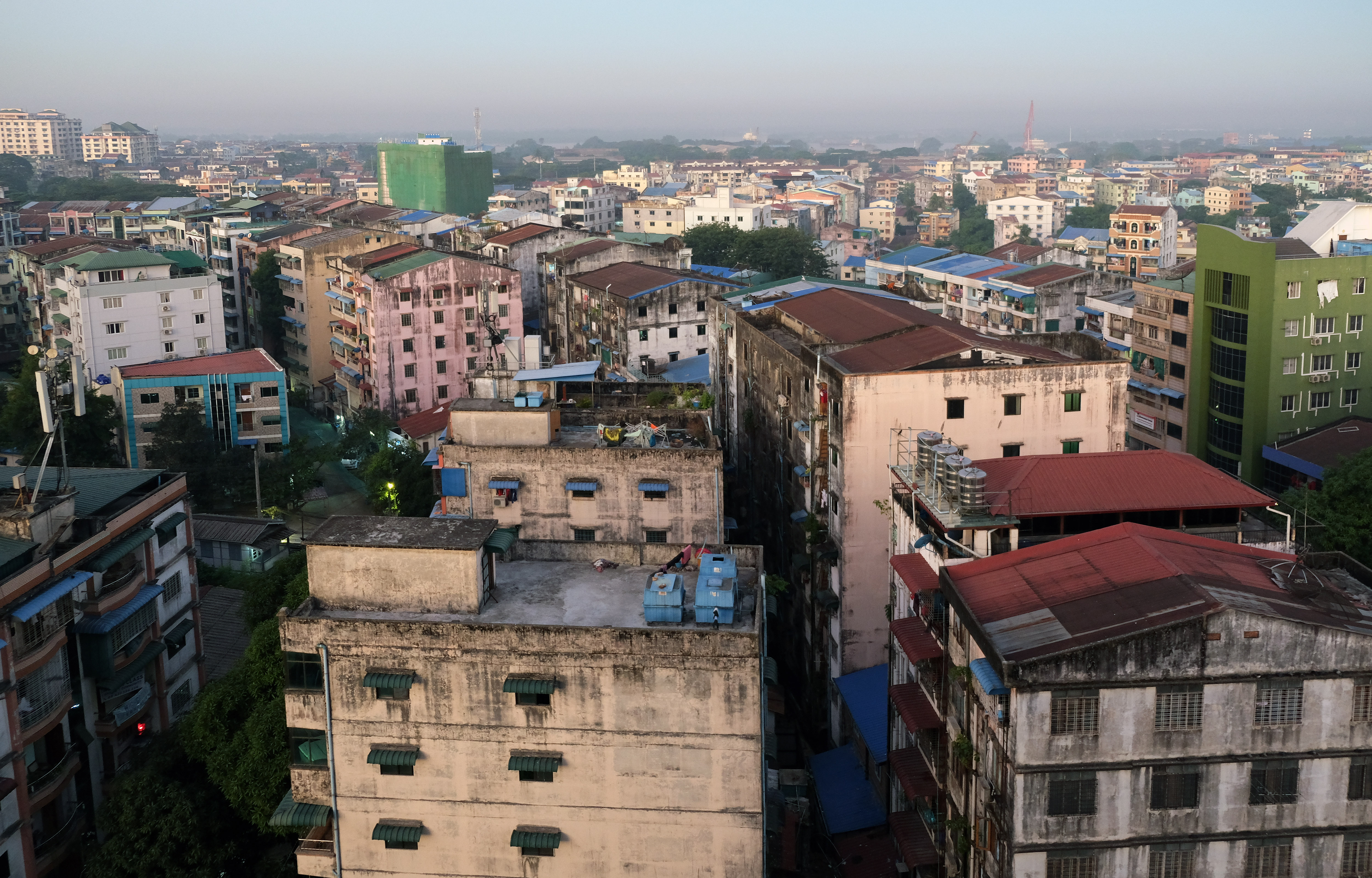
- Yangon cityscape from Hledan
- Date: 21 December 2022
- Meeting no.: 9,231
- Code: S/RES/2669 (Document)
- Subject: Myanmar
- Voting summary: 12 voted for; None voted against; 3 abstained
- Result: Adopted

Security Council composition
- Permanent members: China; France; Russia; United Kingdom; United States
- Non-permanent members: Albania; Brazil; Gabon; Ghana; India; Ireland; Kenya; Mexico; Norway; United Arab Emirates

United Nations Security Council Resolution 2669 was adopted on 21 December 2022. In the resolution, the Security Council expressed its deep concern at the state of emergency imposed in Myanmar on 1 February 2021, demanded an immediate end to all forms of violence in the country and called for the immediate release of all arbitrarily detained prisoners, including Win Myint and Aung San Suu Kyi.

China, India and Russia abstained from the vote.

== See also ==
- List of United Nations Security Council Resolutions 2601 to 2700 (2021–2023)
