= United Nations Security Council Resolution 2659 =

United Nations Security Council Resolution

UN Security Council Resolution 2659
- Flag of the Central African Republic
- Date: 14 November 2022
- Meeting no.: 9,190
- Code: S/RES/2659 (Document)
- Subject: The situation in the Central African Republic
- Voting summary: 12 voted for; None voted against; 3 abstained
- Result: Adopted

Security Council composition
- Permanent members: China; France; Russia; United Kingdom; United States
- Non-permanent members: Albania; Brazil; Gabon; Ghana; India; Ireland; Kenya; Mexico; Norway; United Arab Emirates

United Nations Security Council Resolution 2659 was adopted on 14 November 2022. According to the resolution, the United Nations Security Council voted to renew the mandate of MINUSCA until 15 November 2023.

China, Gabon and Russia abstained from voting.

== See also ==
- List of United Nations Security Council Resolutions 2601 to 2700 (2021–2023)
