= United Nations Security Council Resolution 2683 =

United Nations Security Council Resolution

UN Security Council Resolution 2683
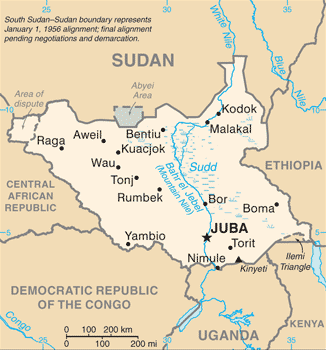
- Map of South Sudan
- Date: 30 May 2023
- Meeting no.: 9,332
- Code: S/RES/2683 (Document)
- Subject: Reports of the Secretary-General on the Sudan and South Sudan
- Voting summary: 10 voted for; None voted against; 5 abstained
- Result: Adopted

Security Council composition
- Permanent members: China; France; Russia; United Kingdom; United States
- Non-permanent members: Albania; Brazil; Ecuador; Gabon; Ghana; Japan; Malta; Mozambique; Switzerland; United Arab Emirates

United Nations Security Council Resolution 2683 was adopted on 30 May 2023. According to the resolution, the Security Council voted to renew an arms embargo against South Sudan until 31 May 2024.

China, Gabon, Ghana, Mozambique and Russia abstained from voting.

== See also ==
- List of United Nations Security Council Resolutions 2601 to 2700 (2021–2023)
