= United Nations Security Council Resolution 2673 =

UN Security Council Resolution 2673
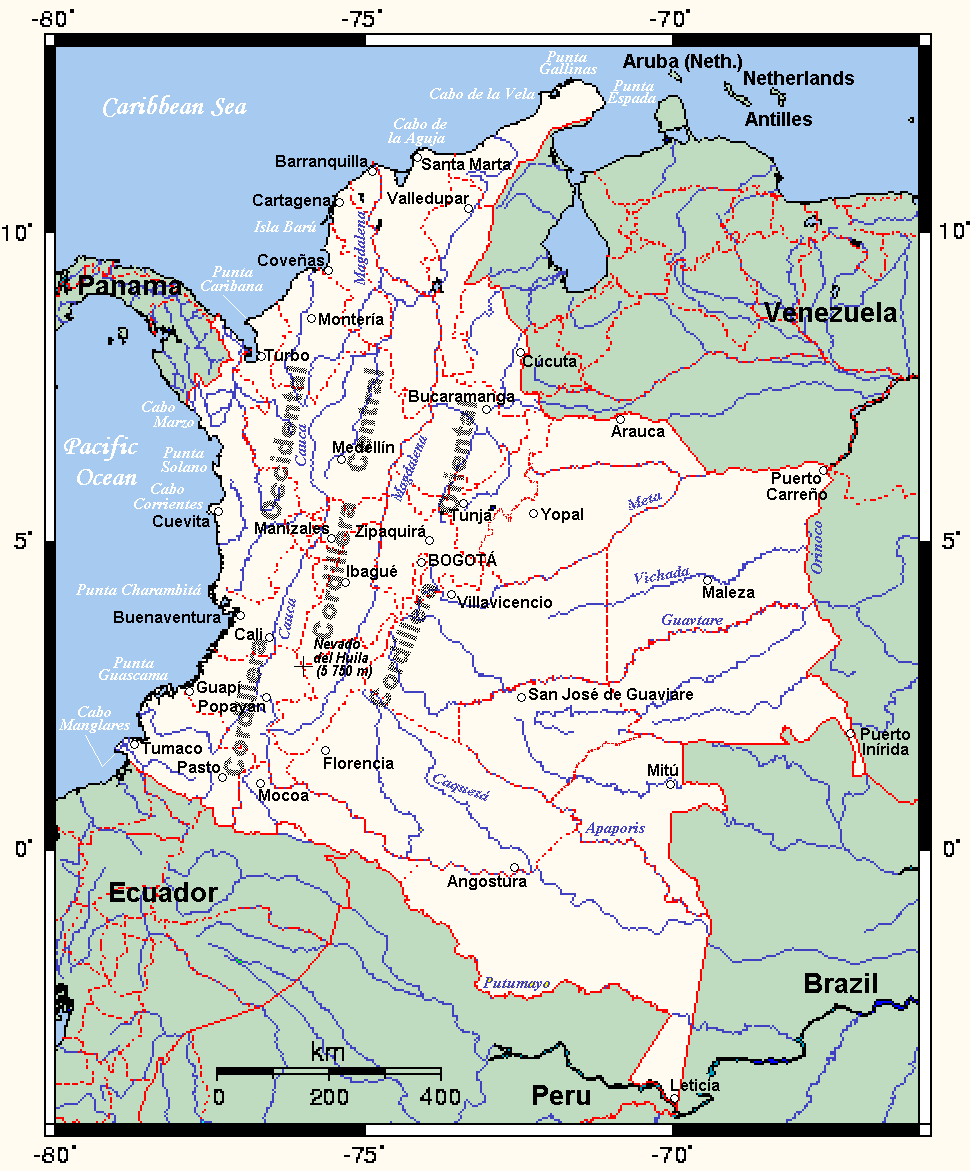
- Map of Colombia
- Date: 11 January 2023
- Meeting no.: 9121
- Code: S/RES/2673 (Document)
- Subject: Extending through 31 August 2023 the United Nations Verification Mission in Colombia
- Voting summary: 15 voted for; None voted against; None abstained
- Result: Adopted

Security Council composition
- Permanent members: China; France; Russia; United Kingdom; United States
- Non-permanent members: Albania; Brazil; Ecuador; Gabon; Ghana; Japan; Malta; Mozambique; Switzerland; United Arab Emirates

United Nations Security Council Resolution 2673 was passed by a unanimous vote on 11 January 2023. In it, the Council expanded the mandate of the United Nations Verification Mission in Colombia and reaffirmed its commitment to the Colombian peace process.

== See also ==
- List of United Nations Security Council Resolutions 2601 to 2700 (2021–2023)
