= United Nations Security Council Resolution 2626 =

United Nations Security Council Resolution

UN Security Council Resolution 2626
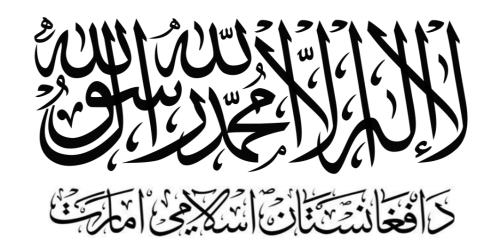
- Flag of Afghanistan
- Date: 17 March 2022
- Meeting no.: 8,997
- Code: S/RES/2626 (Document)
- Subject: The situation in Afghanistan
- Voting summary: 14 voted for; None voted against; 1 abstained
- Result: Adopted

Security Council composition
- Permanent members: China; France; Russia; United Kingdom; United States
- Non-permanent members: Albania; Brazil; Gabon; Ghana; India; Ireland; Kenya; Mexico; Norway; United Arab Emirates

United Nations Security Council Resolution 2626 was adopted on 17 March 2022. In the resolution, the Security Council voted to extend the mandate of United Nations Assistance Mission in Afghanistan (UNSMIL) until 17 March 2023.

Russia abstained from the vote.

== See also ==
- List of United Nations Security Council Resolutions 2601 to 2700 (2021–2023)
