= United Nations Security Council Resolution 2615 =

United Nations Security Council Resolution

UN Security Council Resolution 2615
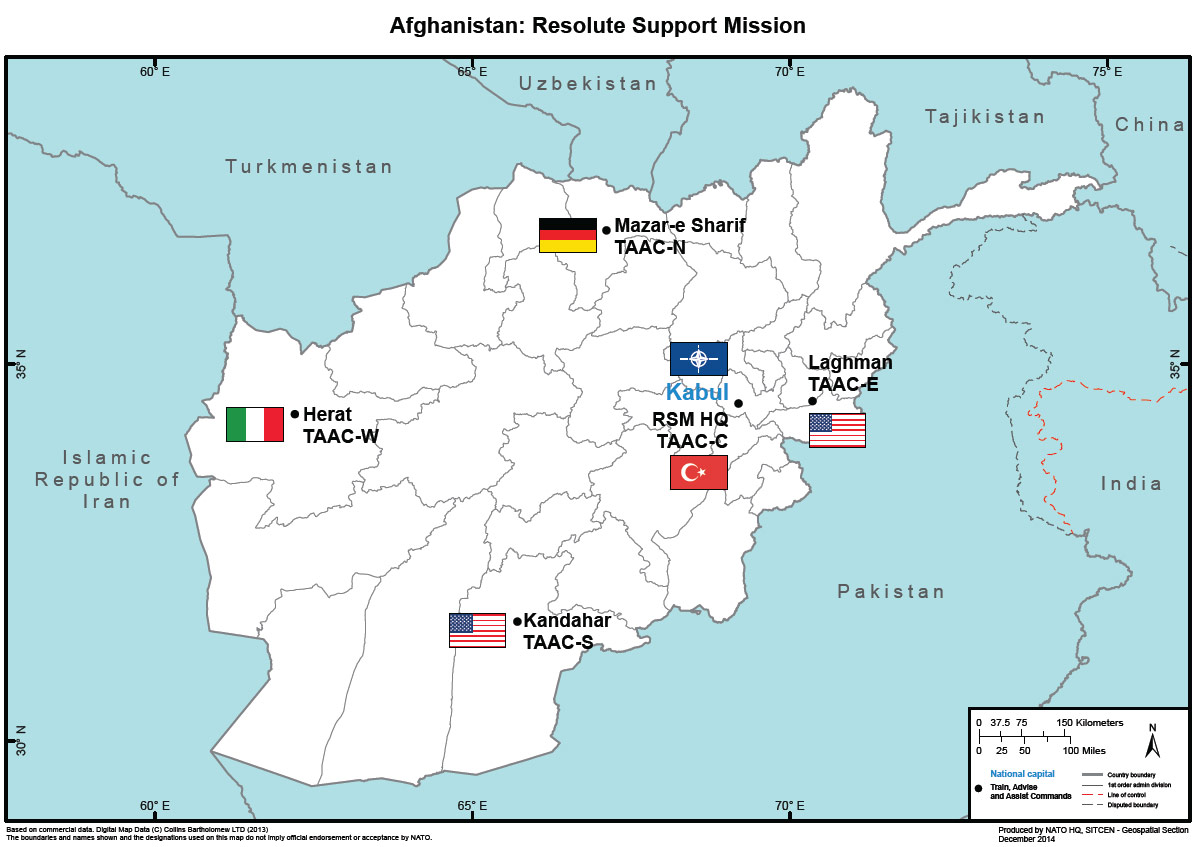
- Map of Afghanistan
- Date: 22 December 2021
- Meeting no.: 8,941
- Code: S/RES/2615
- Subject: Delivery of humanitarian assistance in Afghanistan
- Voting summary: 15 voted for; None voted against; None abstained
- Result: Adopted

Security Council composition
- Permanent members: China; France; Russia; United Kingdom; United States
- Non-permanent members: Estonia; India; Ireland; Kenya; Mexico; Niger; Norway; St.Vincent–Grenadines; Tunisia; Vietnam

United Nations Security Council Resolution 2615 was adopted on 22 December 2021. In the resolution, the Security Council expressed its deep concern regarding the humanitarian situation in Afghanistan. It noted that the situation in the country continued to constitute a threat to international peace and security, called on all parties in all circumstances to respect the human rights of all individuals, and demanded that United Nations humanitarian agencies and other humanitarian actors be allowed full, safe, and unhindered humanitarian access, regardless of gender.

UN agency UNICEF warned that disruptions could be caused by a food crisis in Afghanistan.

== See also ==
- List of United Nations Security Council Resolutions 2601 to 2700 (2021–2023)
