= United Nations Security Council Resolution 2620 =

UN Security Council Resolution 2620
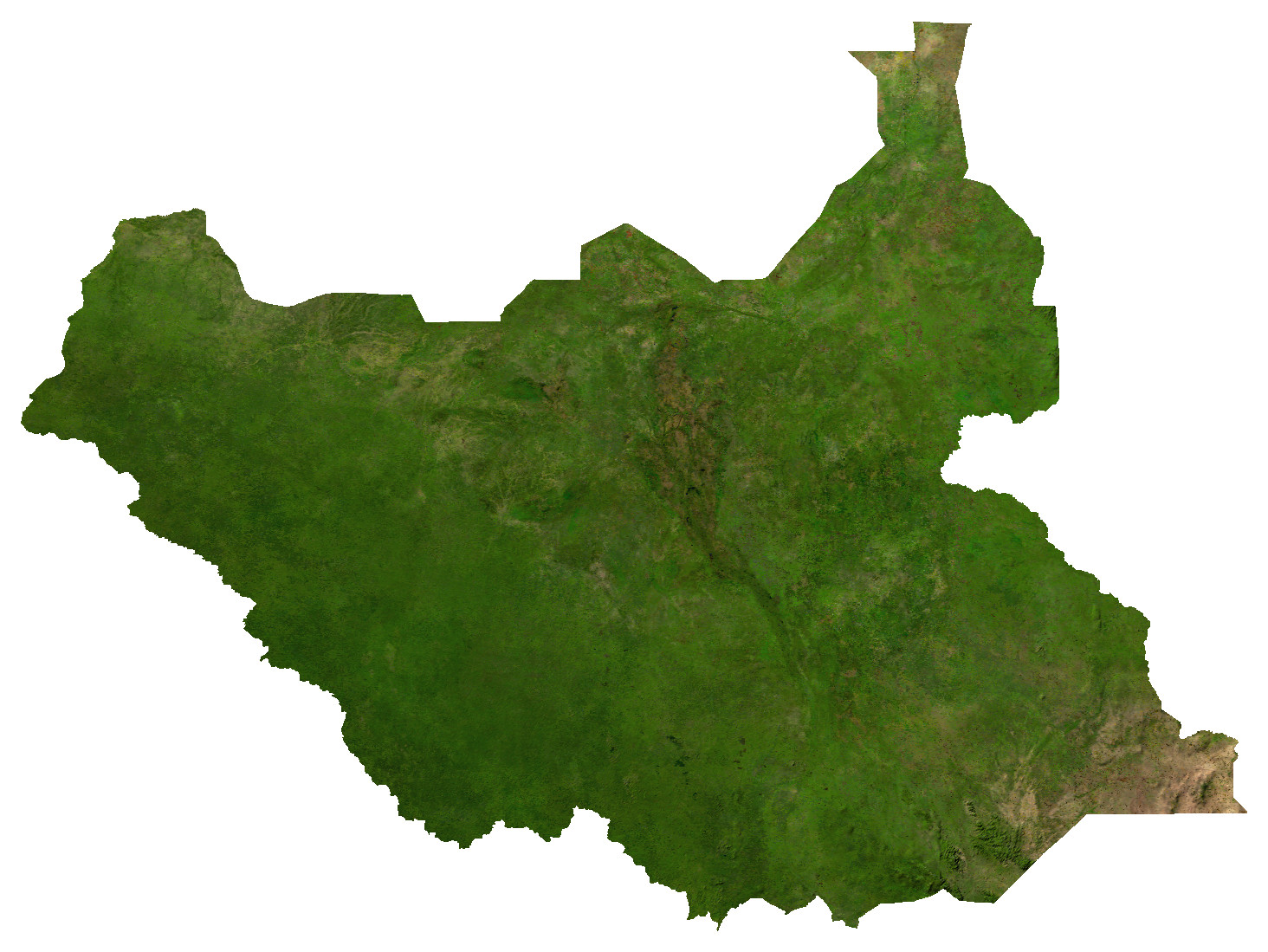
- Map of South Sudan
- Date: 15 February 2022
- Meeting no.: 8964
- Code: S/RES/2620 (Document)
- Subject: Extending through 12 March 2023 the Panel of Experts related to the committee charged with overseeing sanctions against Sudan.
- Voting summary: 15 voted for; None voted against; None abstained
- Result: Adopted

Security Council composition
- Permanent members: China; France; Russia; United Kingdom; United States
- Non-permanent members: Albania; Brazil; Gabon; Ghana; India; Ireland; Kenya; Mexico; Norway; United Arab Emirates

United Nations Security Council Resolution 2620 was passed by a unanimous vote on 15 February 2022, which extended through 12 March 2023 the Panel of Experts related to the committee charged with overseeing sanctions against Sudan.

== See also ==
- List of United Nations Security Council Resolutions 2601 to 2700 (2021–2023)
- War in Sudan (2023–present)
