= United Nations Security Council Resolution 2641 =

United Nations Security Council Resolution

UN Security Council Resolution 2641
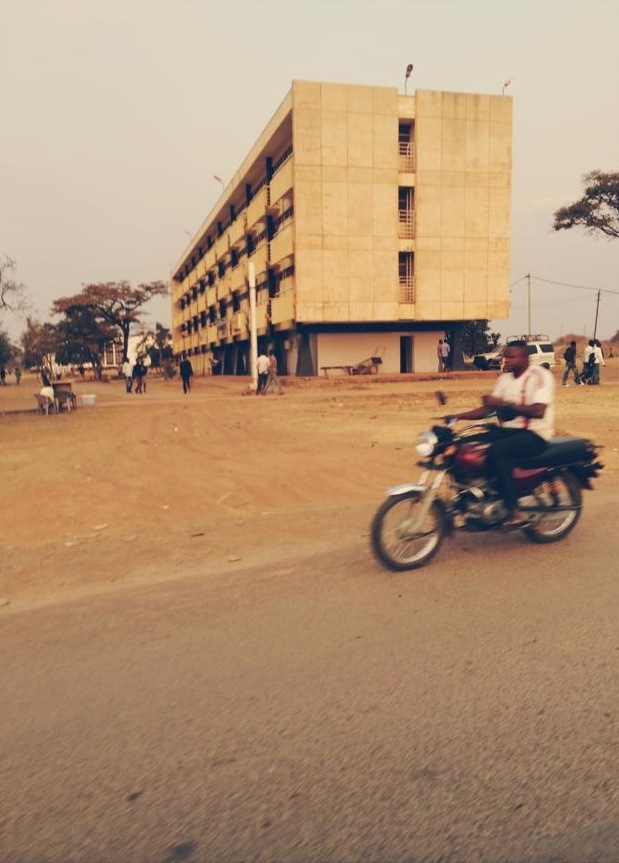
- University of Lubumbashi
- Date: 30 June 2022
- Meeting no.: 9,084
- Code: S/RES/2641 (Document)
- Subject: The situation concerning the Democratic Republic of the Congo
- Voting summary: 10 voted for; None voted against; 5 abstained
- Result: Adopted

Security Council composition
- Permanent members: China; France; Russia; United Kingdom; United States
- Non-permanent members: Albania; Brazil; Gabon; Ghana; India; Ireland; Kenya; Mexico; Norway; United Arab Emirates

United Nations Security Council Resolution 2641 was adopted on 30 June 2022. According to the resolution, the Security Council votes for renews sanctions on Democratic Republic of the Congo until 1 July 2023.

China, Gabon, Ghana, Kenya and Russia abstained from vote.

== Voting ==
Approved (10)	Abstained (5)	Opposed (0)
Albania; Brazil; **France**; India; Ireland; Mexico; Norway; United Arab Emirates; **United Kingdom**; **United States**	**China**; Gabon; Ghana; Kenya; **Russia**	

- Permanent members of the Security Council are in bold.

== See also ==
- List of United Nations Security Council Resolutions 2601 to 2700 (2021–2023)
