= United Nations Security Council Resolution 2642 =

UN Security Council Resolution 2642
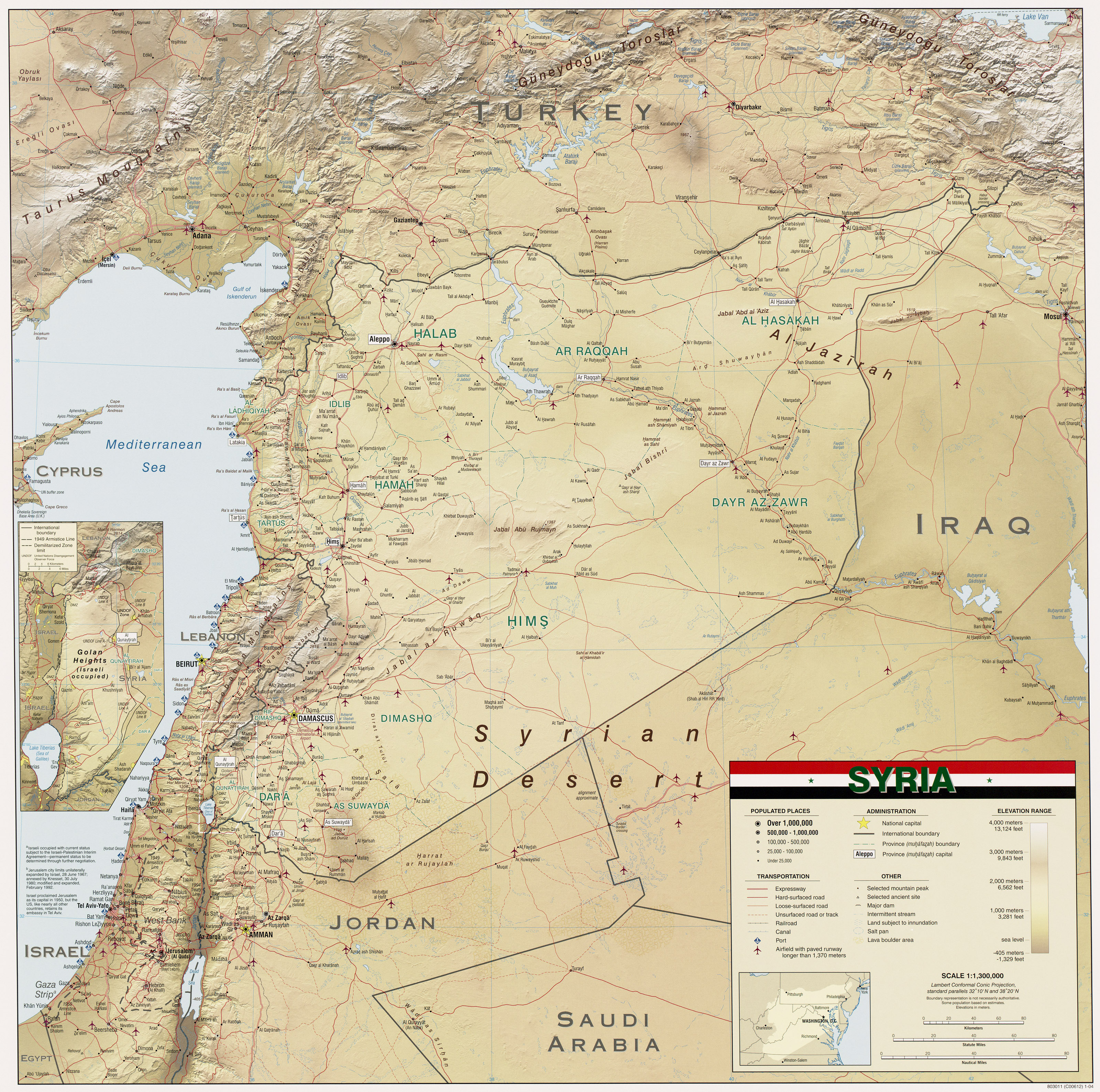
- Date: 12 July 2022
- Meeting no.: 9,089
- Code: S/RES/2642(2022) (Document)
- Subject: The situation in Syria
- Voting summary: 12 voted for; None voted against; 3 abstained
- Result: Adopted

Security Council composition
- Permanent members: China; France; Russia; United Kingdom; United States
- Non-permanent members: Albania; Brazil; Gabon; Ghana; India; Ireland; Kenya; Mexico; Norway; United Arab Emirates

United Nations Security Council Resolution 2642, adopted on 12 July 2022, allowed UN agencies to continue to coordinate and deliver aid cross-border from Turkey to northwestern Syria without Syrian government consent. The security council also extended the delivery of Humanitarian aid into Syria.

Twelve members of the Council voted in favor, while France, United Kingdom and United States abstained.

== Voting ==
Approved (12)	Abstained (3)	Opposed (0)
Albania; Brazil; **China**; Gabon; Ghana; India; Ireland; Kenya; Mexico; Norway; **Russia**; United Arab Emirates	**France**; **United Kingdom**; **United States**	

- Permanent members of the Security Council are in bold.

== See also ==
- List of United Nations Security Council Resolutions 2601 to 2700 (2021–2023)
