= United Nations Security Council Resolution 2633 =

United Nations Security Council Resolution

UN Security Council Resolution 2633
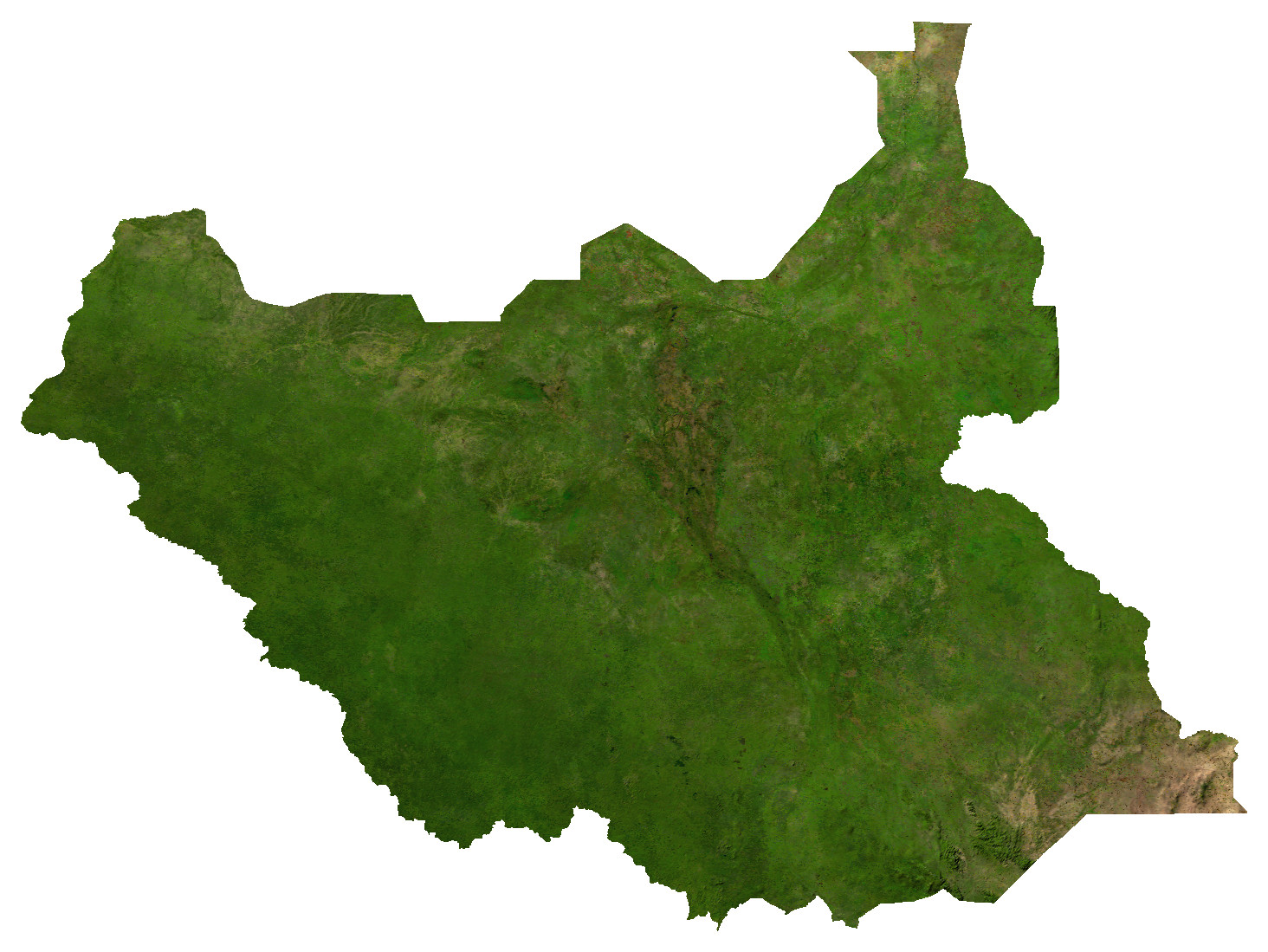
- Map of South Sudan
- Date: 26 May 2022
- Meeting no.: 9,045
- Code: S/RES/2633 (Document)
- Subject: Reports of the Secretary-General on the Sudan and South Sudan
- Voting summary: 10 voted for; None voted against; 5 abstained
- Result: Adopted

Security Council composition
- Permanent members: China; France; Russia; United Kingdom; United States
- Non-permanent members: Albania; Brazil; Gabon; Ghana; India; Ireland; Kenya; Mexico; Norway; United Arab Emirates

United Nations Security Council Resolution 2633 was adopted on 26 May 2022. According to the resolution, the Security Council voted to renew an arms embargo against South Sudan until 31 May 2023.

China, Gabon, India, Kenya and Russia abstained from voting.

== See also ==
- List of United Nations Security Council Resolutions 2601 to 2700 (2021–2023)
