= United Nations Security Council Resolution 2662 =

United Nations Security Council Resolution

UN Security Council Resolution 2662
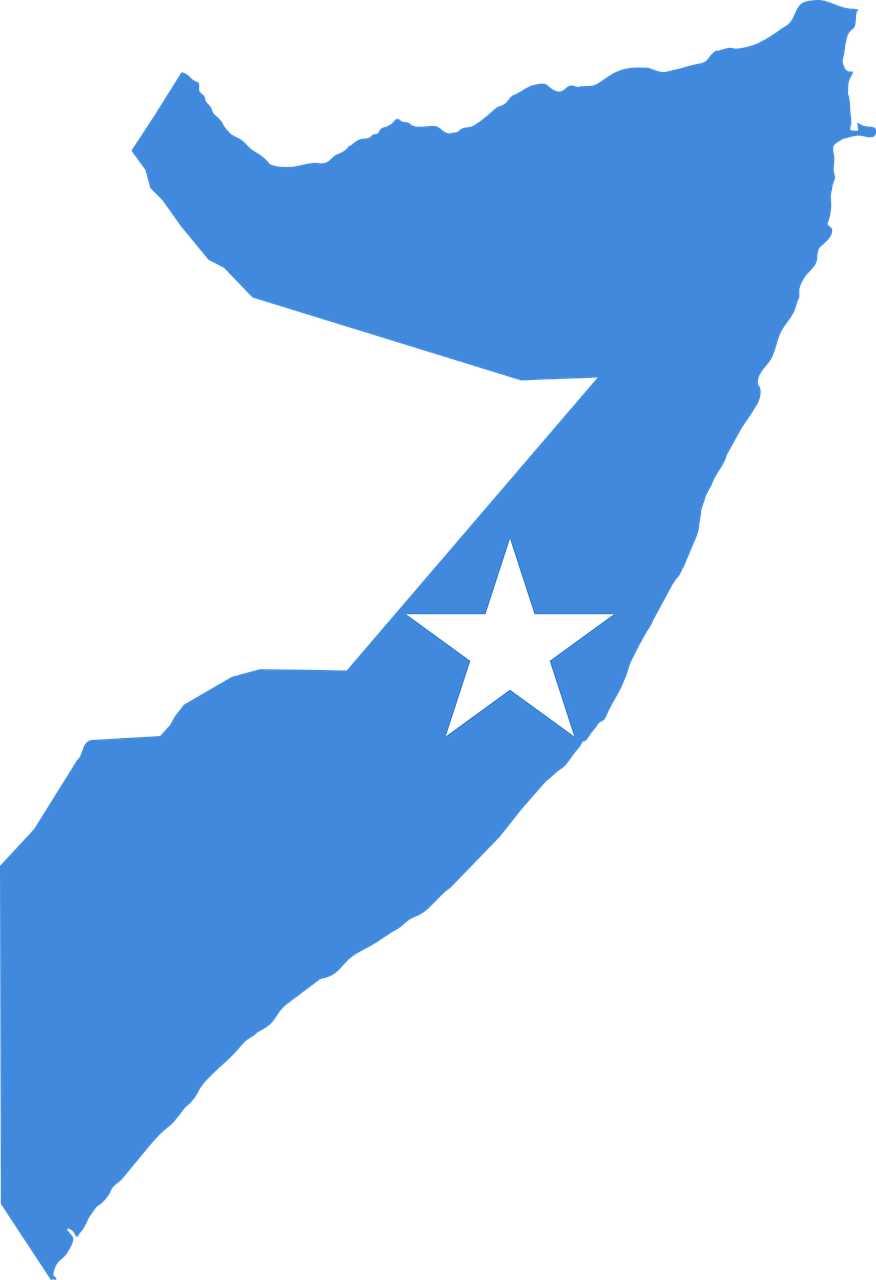
- Map of Somalia
- Date: 17 November 2022
- Meeting no.: 9,196
- Code: S/RES/2662 (Document)
- Subject: The situation in Somalia
- Voting summary: 11 voted for; None voted against; 4 abstained
- Result: Adopted

Security Council composition
- Permanent members: China; France; Russia; United Kingdom; United States
- Non-permanent members: Albania; Brazil; Gabon; Ghana; India; Ireland; Kenya; Mexico; Norway; United Arab Emirates

United Nations Security Council Resolution 2662 was adopted on 17 November 2022. According to the resolution, the Security Council voted for renewed Somalia sanctions until 15 November 2023.

Eleven members of the Council voted in favor, while China, Gabon, Ghana and Russia abstained.

== See also ==
- List of United Nations Security Council Resolutions 2601 to 2700 (2021–2023)
