= United Nations Security Council Resolution 2618 =

United Nations Security Council Resolution adopted in 2022

UN Security Council Resolution 2618
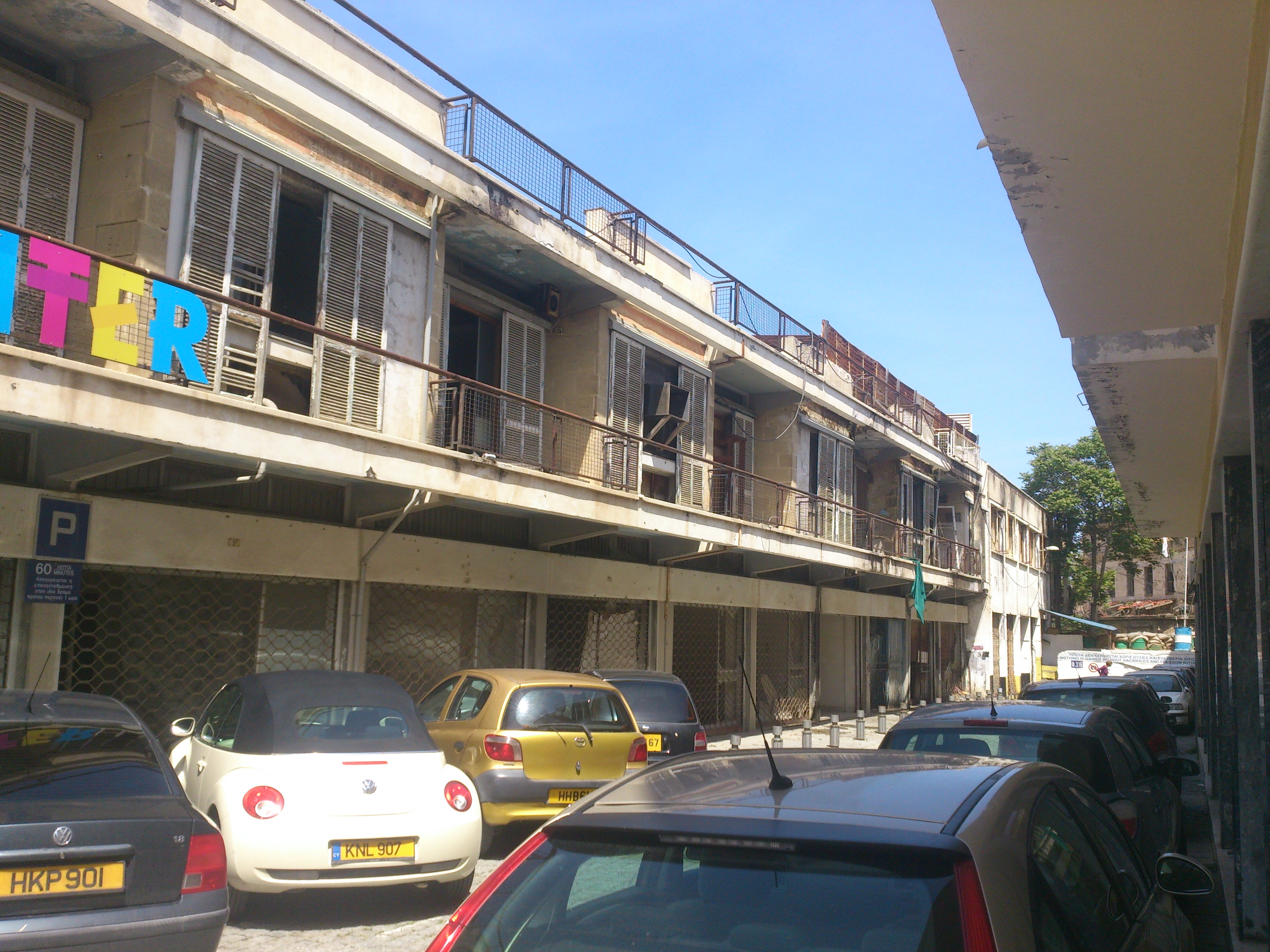
- Buildings in Nicosia
- Date: 27 January 2022
- Meeting no.: 8956
- Code: S/RES/2618 (Document)
- Subject: Extension of mandate of the peacekeeping force in Cyprus until 31 July 2022
- Voting summary: 15 voted for; None voted against; None abstained
- Result: Adopted

Security Council composition
- Permanent members: China; France; Russia; United Kingdom; United States
- Non-permanent members: Albania; Brazil; Gabon; Ghana; India; Ireland; Kenya; Mexico; Norway; United Arab Emirates

United Nations Security Council Resolution 2618 was passed by a unanimous vote on 27 January 2022, which extended the mandate of the United Nations Peacekeeping Force in Cyprus (UNFICYP) until 31 July 2022.

== See also ==
- List of United Nations Security Council Resolutions 2601 to 2700 (2021–2023)
