= United Nations Security Council Resolution 2692 =

United Nations Security Council Resolution

UN Security Council Resolution 2692
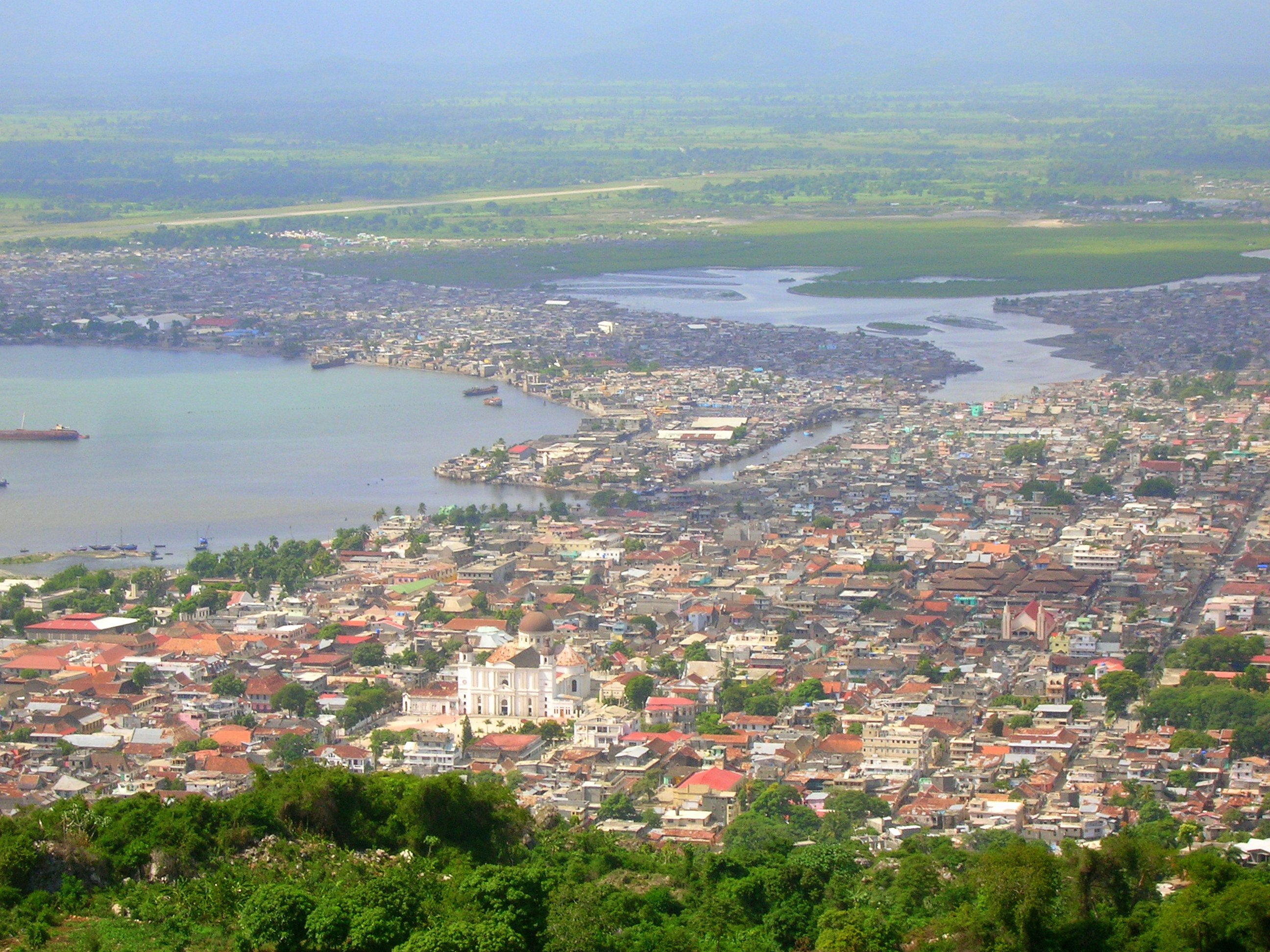
- Skyline Cap-Haïtien
- Date: 14 July 2023
- Meeting no.: 9,377
- Code: S/RES/2692 (Document)
- Subject: The question concerning Haiti
- Voting summary: 15 voted for; None voted against; None abstained
- Result: Adopted

Security Council composition
- Permanent members: China; France; Russia; United Kingdom; United States
- Non-permanent members: Albania; Brazil; Ecuador; Gabon; Ghana; Japan; Malta; Mozambique; Switzerland; United Arab Emirates

United Nations Security Council Resolution 2692 was adopted on 14 July 2023. According to the resolution, the Security Council extends mandate of United Nations Integrated Office in Haiti until 15 July 2024.

The resolution allowed unhindered humanitarian access to all people, and the full protection, safety and security of medical and humanitarian personnel in Haiti.

== See also ==
- List of United Nations Security Council Resolutions 2601 to 2700 (2021–2023)
