= United Nations Verification Mission in Colombia =

United Nations mission in Colombia

- Abbreviation: UNVIC, UNVMC
- Formation: 2017
- Type: UN Special Political Mission
- Parent organization: United Nations Department of Political and Peacebuilding Affairs
- Website: https://colombia.unmissions.org/en

The United Nations Verification Mission in Colombia (UNVIC) began on 26 September 2017, following the conclusion of the United Nations Mission in Colombia. The mission supports the peace process amid the Colombian conflict and was extended in 2023 by United Nations Security Council Resolution 2673.
