= List of United Nations Security Council Resolutions 2501 to 2600 =

This is a list of United Nations Security Council Resolutions 2501 to 2600 adopted between 16 December 2019 and 15 October 2021.

Resolution	Date	Vote	Concerns
2501	16 December 2019	15–0–0	Threats to international peace and security caused by terrorist acts
2502	19 December 2019	15–0–0	The situation concerning the Democratic Republic of the Congo
2503	19 December 2019	15–0–0	The situation in the Middle East
2504	10 January 2020	11–0–4 (abstentions: China, Russian Federation, United Kingdom, and United States)	The situation in the Middle East
2505	13 January 2020	15–0–0	The situation in the Middle East
2506	30 January 2020	15–0–0	The situation in Cyprus
2507	31 January 2020	13–0–2 (abstentions: China and Russian Federation)	The situation in the Central African Republic
2508	11 February 2020	15–0–0	Reports of the Secretary-General on the Sudan and South Sudan
2509	11 February 2020	14–0–1 (abstention: Russian Federation)	The situation in Libya
2510	12 February 2020	14–0–1 (abstention: Russian Federation)	The situation in Libya
2511	25 February 2020	13–0–2 (abstentions: China and Russian Federation)	The situation in the Middle East
2512	28 February 2020	15–0–0	The situation in Guinea-Bissau
2513	10 March 2020	15–0–0	The situation in Afghanistan
2514	12 March 2020	15–0–0	Reports of the Secretary-General on the Sudan and South Sudan
2515	30 March 2020	15–0–0	Non-proliferation/Democratic People's Republic of Korea
2516	30 March 2020	15–0–0	The situation in Somalia
2517	30 March 2020	15–0–0	Reports of the Secretary-General on the Sudan and South Sudan
2518	30 March 2020	15–0–0	United Nations peacekeeping operations
2519	14 May 2020	15–0–0	Reports of the Secretary-General on the Sudan and South Sudan
2520	29 May 2020	15–0–0	The situation in Somalia
2521	29 May 2020	12–0–3 (abstentions: China, Russian Federation, and South Africa)	Reports of the Secretary-General on the Sudan and South Sudan
2522	29 May 2020	15–0–0	The situation concerning Iraq
2523	29 May 2020	15–0–0	Reports of the Secretary-General on the Sudan and South Sudan
2524	4 June 2020	15–0–0	Reports of the Secretary-General on the Sudan and South Sudan
2525	4 June 2020	15–0–0	Reports of the Secretary-General on the Sudan and South Sudan
2526	5 June 2020	15–0–0	The situation in Libya
2527	22 June 2020	15–0–0	The situation in Somalia
2528	25 June 2020	15–0–0	The situation concerning the Democratic Republic of the Congo
2529	25 June 2020	14–0–1 (abstention: Russian Federation)	International Residual Mechanism for Criminal Tribunals
2530	29 June 2020	15–0–0	The situation in the Middle East
2531	29 June 2020	15–0–0	The situation in Mali
2532	1 July 2020	15–0–0	Maintenance of international peace and security during COVID-19
2533	11 July 2020	12–0–3 (abstentions: China, Dominican Republic, and Russian Federation)	Humanitarian situation in Syria
2534	14 July 2020	15–0–0	The situation in Yemen
2535	14 July 2020	15–0–0	Maintenance of international peace and security
2536	28 July 2020	15–0–0	The situation in the Central African Republic
2537	28 July 2020	15–0–0	The situation in Cyprus
2538	28 August 2020	15–0–0	United Nations peacekeeping operations
2539	28 August 2020	15–0–0	The situation in Lebanon
2540	28 August 2020	15–0–0	The situation in Somalia
2541	31 August 2020	15–0–0	The situation in Mali
2542	15 September 2020	13–0–2 (abstentions: China and Russian Federation)	The situation in Libya
2543	15 September 2020	15–0–0	The situation in Afghanistan
2544	18 September 2020	15–0–0	Threats to international peace and security
2545	25 September 2020	15–0–0	Extends Mandate of the United Nations Verification Mission in Colombia
2546	2 October 2020	15–0–0	Maintenance of international peace and security
2547	15 October 2020	13–0–2 (abstentions: China and Russian Federation)	The question concerning Haiti
2548	30 October 2020	13–0–2 (abstentions: Russian Federation and South Africa)	The situation concerning Western Sahara
2549	5 November 2020	15–0–0	The situation in Bosnia and Herzegovina
2550	12 November 2020	15–0–0	Reports of the Secretary-General on the Sudan and South Sudan
2551	12 November 2020	13–0–2 (abstentions: China and Russian Federation)	The situation in Somalia
2552	12 November 2020	15–0–0	Extends mandate of the United Nations Multidimensional Integrated Stabilization Mission in the Central African Republic
2553	3 December 2020	15–0–0	Security sector reform
2554	4 December 2020	15–0–0	The situation in Somalia
2555	18 December 2020	15–0–0	The situation in the Middle East
2556	18 December 2020	14–0–1 (abstention: Russian Federation)	The situation concerning the Democratic Republic of the Congo
2557	18 December 2020	15–0–0	Threats to international peace and security
2558	21 December 2020	15–0–0	Peacebuilding and sustaining peace
2559	22 December 2020	15–0–0	Reports of the Secretary-General on the Sudan and South Sudan
2560	29 December 2020	15–0–0	Threats to international peace and security caused by terrorist acts
2561	29 January 2021	15–0–0	The situation in Cyprus
2562	11 February 2021	15–0–0	Reports of the Secretary-General on the Sudan and South Sudan
2563	25 February 2021	15–0–0	The situation in Somalia
2564	25 February 2021	14–0–1 (abstention: Russian Federation)	The situation in Yemen
2565	26 February 2021	15–0–0	Maintenance of international peace and security during COVID-19
2566	12 March 2021	14–0–1 (abstention: Russian Federation)	The situation in the Central African Republic
2567	12 March 2021	15–0–0	Reports of the Secretary-General on the Sudan and South Sudan
2568	12 March 2021	15–0–0	The situation in Somalia
2569	26 March 2021	15–0–0	Non-proliferation/Democratic People's Republic of Korea
2570	16 April 2021	15–0–0	The situation in Libya
2571	16 April 2021	15–0–0	The situation in Libya
2572	22 April 2021	15–0–0	Non-proliferation of weapons of mass destruction
2573	27 April 2021	15–0–0	Protection of civilians in armed conflict
2574	11 May 2021	15–0–0	Extends Mandate of the United Nations Verification Mission in Colombia
2575	11 May 2021	15–0–0	Reports of the Secretary-General on the Sudan and South Sudan
2576	27 May 2021	15–0–0	The situation concerning Iraq
2577	28 May 2021	13–0–2 (abstentions: India and Kenya)	Reports of the Secretary-General on the Sudan and South Sudan
2578	3 June 2021	15–0–0	The situation in Libya
2579	3 June 2021	15–0–0	Reports of the Secretary-General on the Sudan and South Sudan
2580	8 June 2021	Adopted by acclamation	Recommends António Guterres for second term as Secretary-General of the United Nations
2581	29 June 2021	15–0–0	The situation in the Middle East
2582	29 June 2021	15–0–0	The situation concerning the Democratic Republic of the Congo
2583	29 June 2021	Adopted without vote	Death of James Richard Crawford and election to the International Court of Justice
2584	29 June 2021	15–0–0	The situation in Mali
2585	9 July 2021	15–0–0	The situation in Syria
2586	14 July 2021	15–0–0	The situation in Yemen
2587	29 July 2021	15–0–0	The situation in Cyprus
2588	29 July 2021	14–0–1 (abstention: China)	The situation in the Central African Republic
2589	18 August 2021	15–0–0	United Nations peacekeeping operations
2590	30 August 2021	15–0–0	The situation in Mali
2591	30 August 2021	15–0–0	The situation in Lebanon
2592	30 August 2021	15–0–0	The situation in Somalia
2593	30 August 2021	13–0–2 (abstentions: China and Russian Federation)	The situation in Afghanistan
2594	9 September 2021	15–0–0	United Nations peacekeeping operations
2595	15 September 2021	15–0–0	The situation in Libya
2596	17 September 2021	15–0–0	The situation in Afghanistan
2597	17 September 2021	15–0–0	Threats to international peace and security
2598	29 September 2021	15–0–0	Maintenance of international peace and security
2599	30 September 2021	15–0–0	The situation in Libya
2600	15 October 2021	15–0–0	The question concerning Haiti

== See also ==
- Lists of United Nations Security Council resolutions
- List of United Nations Security Council Resolutions 2401 to 2500
- List of United Nations Security Council Resolutions 2601 to 2700
