= United Nations Security Council Resolution 2548 =

United Nations Security Council Resolution

UN Security Council Resolution 2548
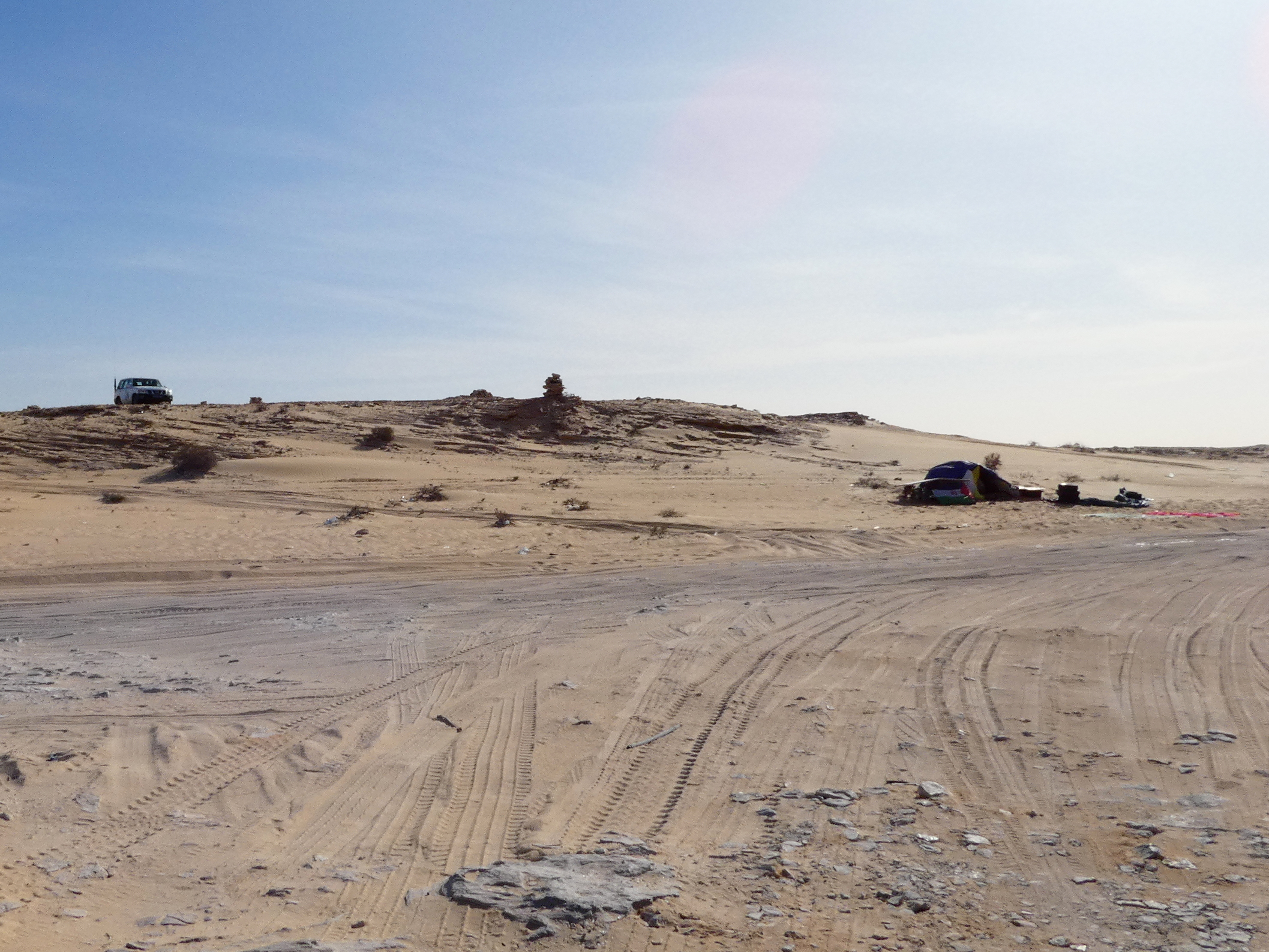
- UN patrol in the Western Sahara
- Date: 30 October 2020
- Code: S/RES/2548 (Document)
- Subject: The situation concerning Western Sahara
- Voting summary: 13 voted for; None voted against; 2 abstained
- Result: Adopted

Security Council composition
- Permanent members: China; France; Russia; United Kingdom; United States
- Non-permanent members: Belgium; Dominican Republic; Estonia; Germany; Indonesia; Niger; St.Vincent–Grenadines; South Africa; Tunisia; Vietnam

United Nations Security Council Resolution 2548 was adopted on 30 October 2020. According to the resolution, the Security Council voted to extend the mandate of United Nations Mission for the Referendum in Western Sahara (MINURSO) until 31 October 2021.

Thirteen members of the Council voted in favor, while Russia and South Africa abstained.

== See also ==
- List of United Nations Security Council Resolutions 2501 to 2600 (2019–2021)
