= United Nations Security Council Resolution 2593 =

UN Security Council Resolution 2593
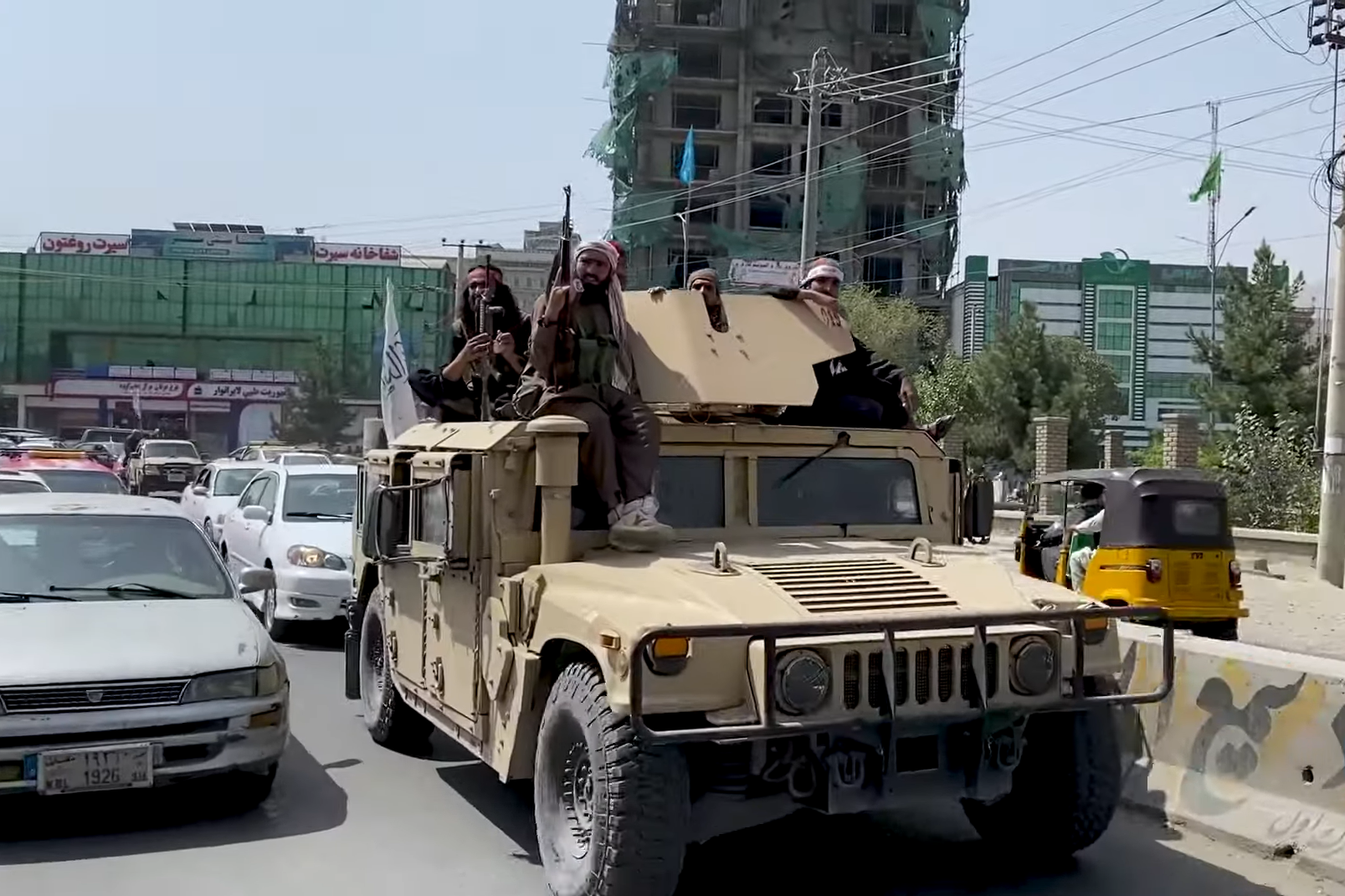
- Taliban fighters patrolling Kabul in a Humvee, 17 August 2021
- Date: 30 August 2021
- Code: S/RES/2593
- Subject: Demanding that Afghan territory not be used to threaten or attack any country
- Voting summary: 13 voted for; None voted against; 2 abstained
- Result: Adopted

Security Council composition
- Permanent members: China; France; Russia; United Kingdom; United States
- Non-permanent members: Estonia; India; Ireland; Kenya; Mexico; Niger; Norway; St.Vincent–Grenadines; Tunisia; Vietnam

United Nations Security Council Resolution 2593 was adopted on 30 August 2021, following the Fall of Kabul and subsequent Taliban takeover in Afghanistan. In the resolution, the Security Council demanded that Afghan territory not be used to threaten or attack any other country, to shelter and train terrorists, or to plan or finance terrorist acts.

== Resolution summary ==
The United Nations Security Council strongly condemned the 2021 Kabul airport attack on 26 August 2021, which resulted in over 300 deaths and injuries, and the subsequent return to power of the Taliban. The resolution called for further efforts to provide humanitarian aid to Afghanistan and countries hosting Afghan refugees. The 15-country council demanded that "Afghan territory not be used to threaten or attack any country and reiterated the importance of combating terrorism in Afghanistan." It also called on all parties to allow full access to the United Nations and humanitarian actors.

The resolution is two pages long and was adopted at the United Nations Security Council's 8848th meeting on 30 August 2021 between 3 and 4 P.M.

== Voting results ==
France, the United Kingdom, the United States, Estonia, India, Ireland, Kenya, Mexico, Niger, Norway, Saint Vincent and the Grenadines, Tunisia and Vietnam voted to adopt the resolution. Russia and China abstained from the vote.

The representative from Russia, while condemning the terrorist attacks, said the abstention was due to a refusal to include his suggested additional passage on terrorism. The representative from China said he abstained due to concerns about the balance of the resolution's contents and due to doubts about the urgency of the resolution.

== See also ==
- War in Afghanistan
- List of United Nations Security Council Resolutions 2501 to 2600 (2019–2021)
