= United Nations Security Council Resolution 2507 =

UN Security Council Resolution 2507
- Flag of the Central African Republic
- Date: 31 January 2020
- Meeting no.: 8,712
- Code: S/RES/2507 (Document)
- Subject: Central African Republic
- Voting summary: 13 voted for; None voted against; 2 abstained
- Result: Adopted

Security Council composition
- Permanent members: China; France; Russia; United Kingdom; United States
- Non-permanent members: Belgium; Dominican Republic; Estonia; Germany; Indonesia; Niger; St.Vincent–Grenadines; South Africa; Tunisia; Vietnam

United Nations Security Council resolution 2507 was adopted in 2020.

China and Russia abstained from the vote.

== See also ==
- List of United Nations Security Council Resolutions 2501 to 2600 (2019–2021)
