= United Nations Security Council Resolution 2516 =

UN Security Council Resolution 2516
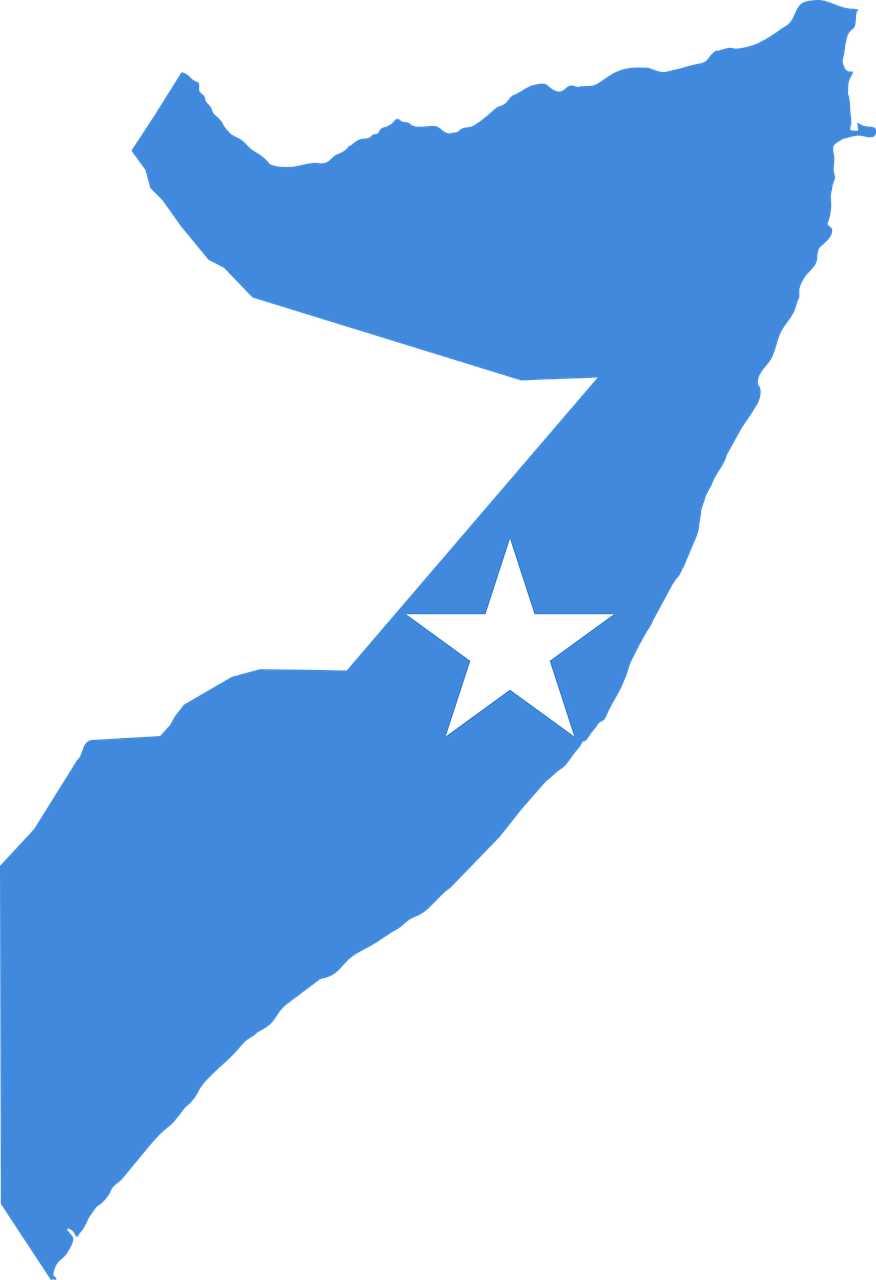
- Map of Somalia
- Date: 30 March 2020
- Code: S/RES/2516 (Document)
- Subject: Somalia
- Voting summary: 15 voted for; None voted against; None abstained
- Result: Adopted

Security Council composition
- Permanent members: China; France; Russia; United Kingdom; United States
- Non-permanent members: Belgium; Dominican Republic; Estonia; Germany; Indonesia; Niger; St.Vincent–Grenadines; South Africa; Tunisia; Vietnam

United Nations Security Council Resolution 2516 was adopted in 2020.

== See also ==
- List of United Nations Security Council Resolutions 2501 to 2600 (2019–2021)
