= United Nations Security Council Resolution 2501 =

UN Security Council Resolution 2501
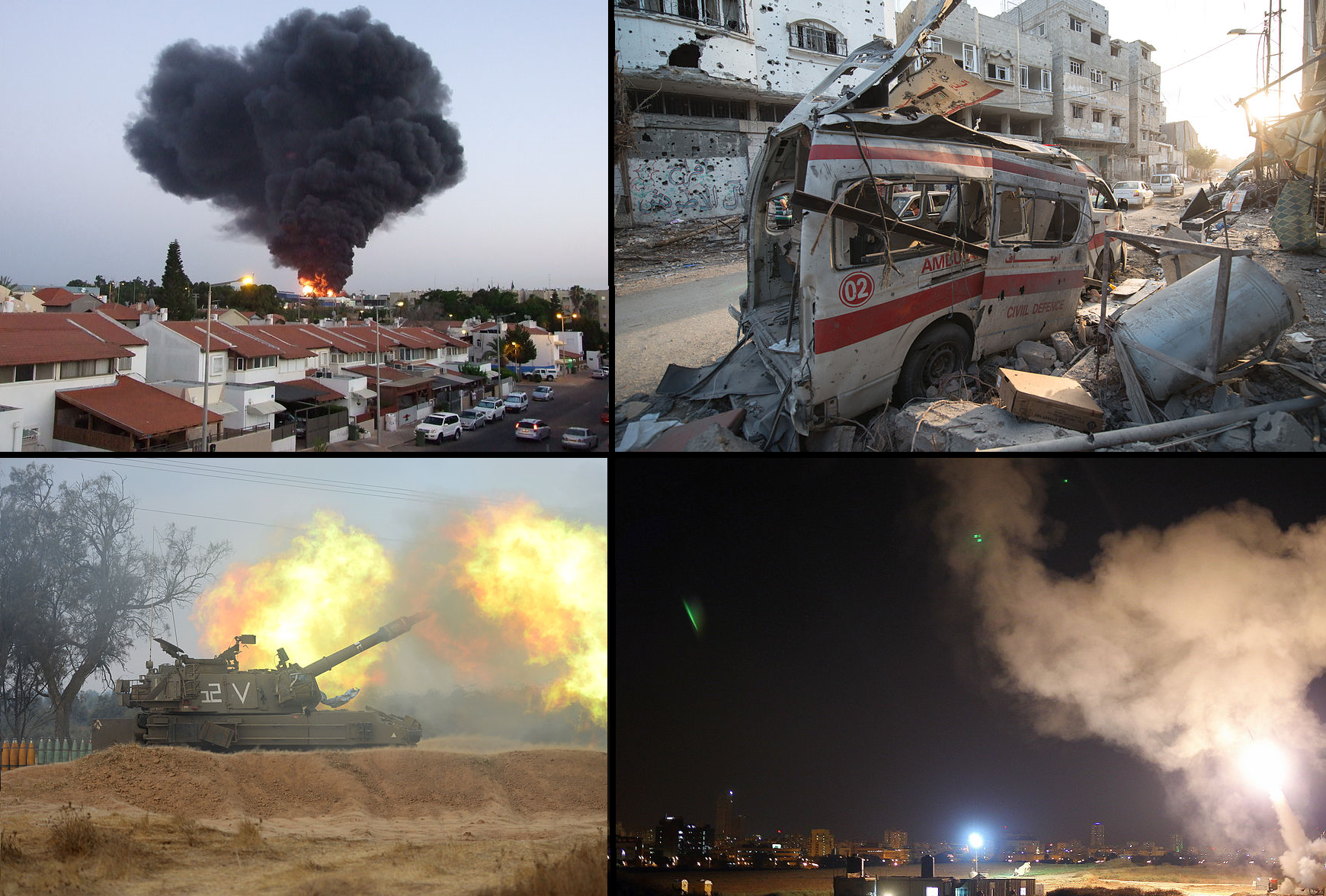
- War in Gaza
- Date: 16 December 2019
- Meeting no.: 8,686
- Code: S/RES/2501 (Document)
- Subject: Threats to international peace and security caused by terrorist acts
- Voting summary: 15 voted for; None voted against; None abstained
- Result: Adopted

Security Council composition
- Permanent members: China; France; Russia; United Kingdom; United States
- Non-permanent members: Belgium; Côte d'Ivoire; Dominican Republic; Equatorial Guinea; Germany; Indonesia; Kuwait; Peru; Poland; South Africa

United Nations Security Council resolution 2501 was adopted in 2019.

== See also ==
- List of United Nations Security Council Resolutions 2501 to 2600 (2019–2021)
