= United Nations Security Council Resolution 2560 =

UN Security Council Resolution 2560
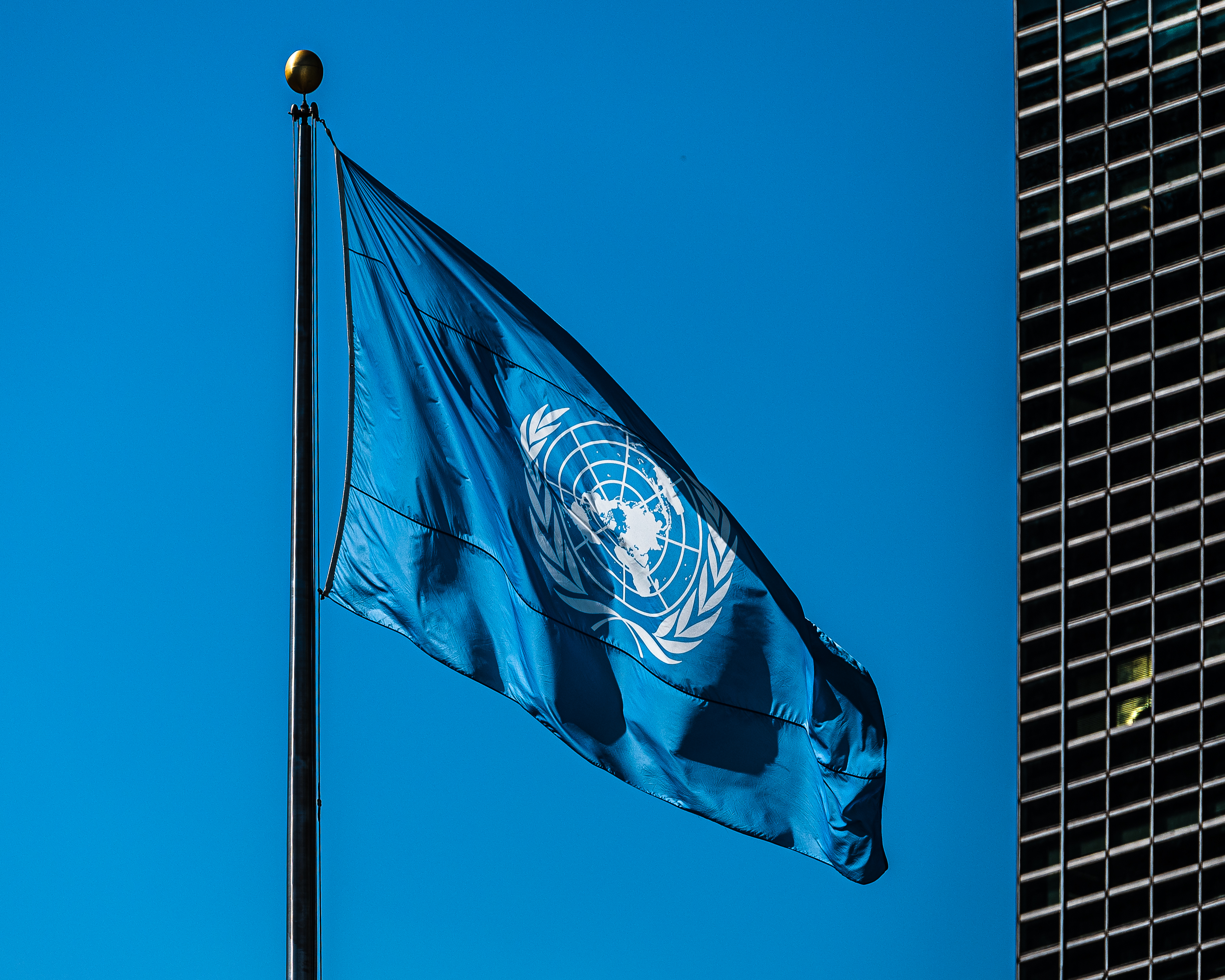
- UN flag
- Date: 29 December 2020
- Code: S/RES/2560 (Document)
- Subject: Threats to international peace and security caused by terrorist acts
- Voting summary: 15 voted for; None voted against; None abstained
- Result: Adopted

Security Council composition
- Permanent members: China; France; Russia; United Kingdom; United States
- Non-permanent members: Belgium; Dominican Republic; Estonia; Germany; Indonesia; Niger; St.Vincent–Grenadines; South Africa; Tunisia; Vietnam

United Nations Security Council Resolution 2560 was adopted on December 29, 2020. It was the last Security Council resolution of the year.

The resolution, adopted unanimously, encouraged the member countries to operate more actively in respect to the enforcement of sanctions on individuals and groups related to the Islamic State of Iraq and the Levant and Al-Qaeda. The Security Council urged the countries to interact more proficuously with the committee dedicated to the overseeing of the enforcement of sanctions against this terrorist groups located in Iraq, Syria, Libya, and Somalia.

Additionally, the resolution pushed for the submission to the committee of lists and data regarding individuals, groups, undertakings and entities that could meet the criteria established by resolution 2368, in order to maintain the material about the ISIS and Al-Qaeda sanctions record reliable and up to date. It also recommended the establishment of a team for the monitorization of sanctions, to study the exemption procedures laid out in resolution 2368, and to draft an advice to the committee on whether an exemptions update is required.

== See also ==
- List of United Nations Security Council Resolutions 2501 to 2600 (2019–2021)
