= United Nations Security Council Resolution 2510 =

2020 call for a ceasefire in Libya

UN Security Council Resolution 2510
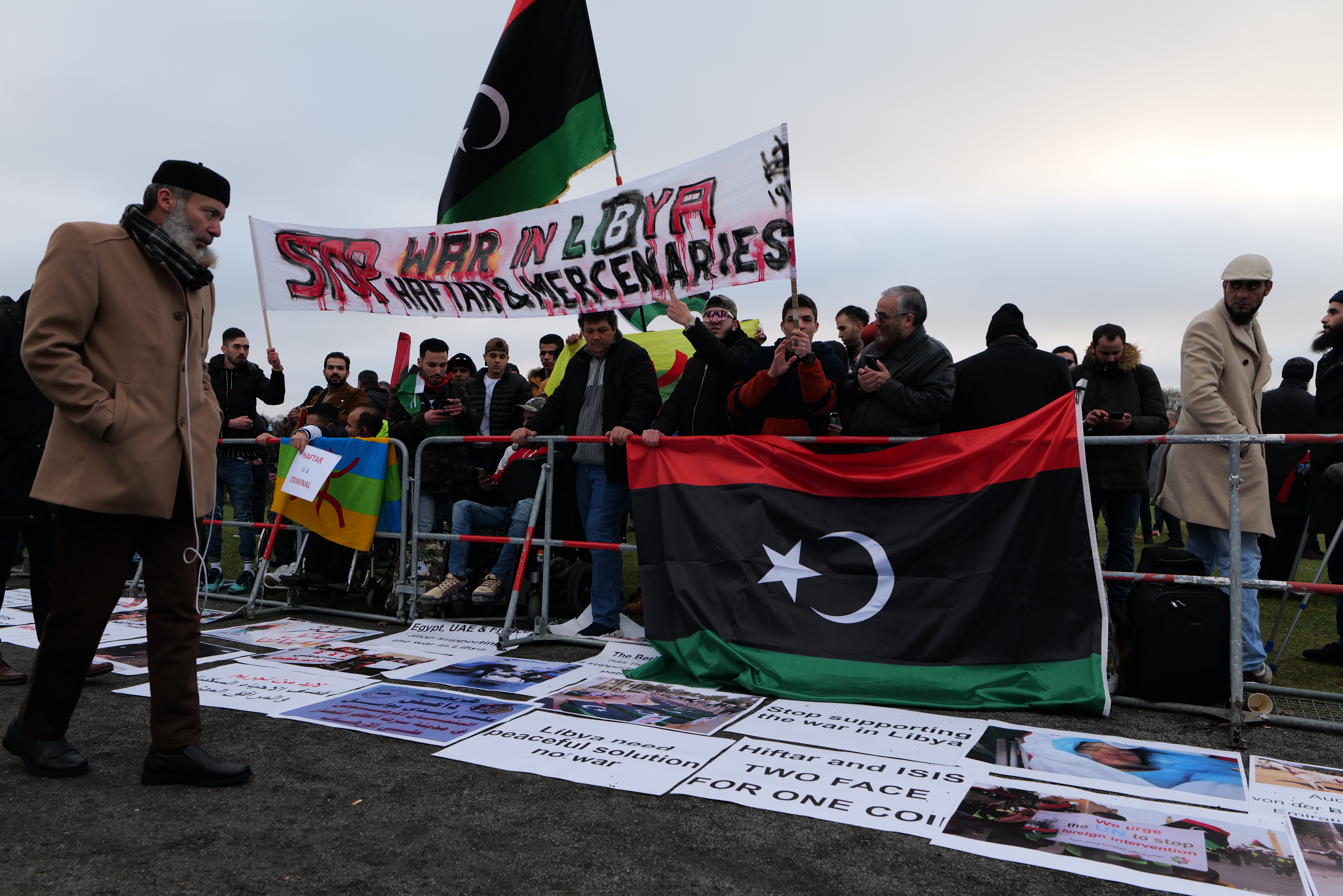
- Demonstration against Khalifa Haftar in Berlin, Germany
- Date: 12 February 2020
- Code: S/RES/2510
- Subject: Libya
- Voting summary: 14 voted for; None voted against; 1 abstained
- Result: Adopted

Security Council composition
- Permanent members: China; France; Russia; United Kingdom; United States
- Non-permanent members: Belgium; Dominican Republic; Estonia; Germany; Indonesia; Niger; St.Vincent–Grenadines; South Africa; Tunisia; Vietnam

United Nations Security Council Resolution 2510 was unanimously adopted on 12 February 2020. It calls for a nationwide ceasefire in Libya and for enforcement of the Libya arms embargo. According to the resolution, the cease-fire does not apply to military operations against the Government of National Accord and Khalifa Haftar.

Russia abstained from the vote.

== See also ==
- 2019–20 Western Libya offensive
- List of United Nations Security Council Resolutions 2501 to 2600 (2019–2021)
