= United Nations Security Council Resolution 2504 =

UN Security Council Resolution 2504
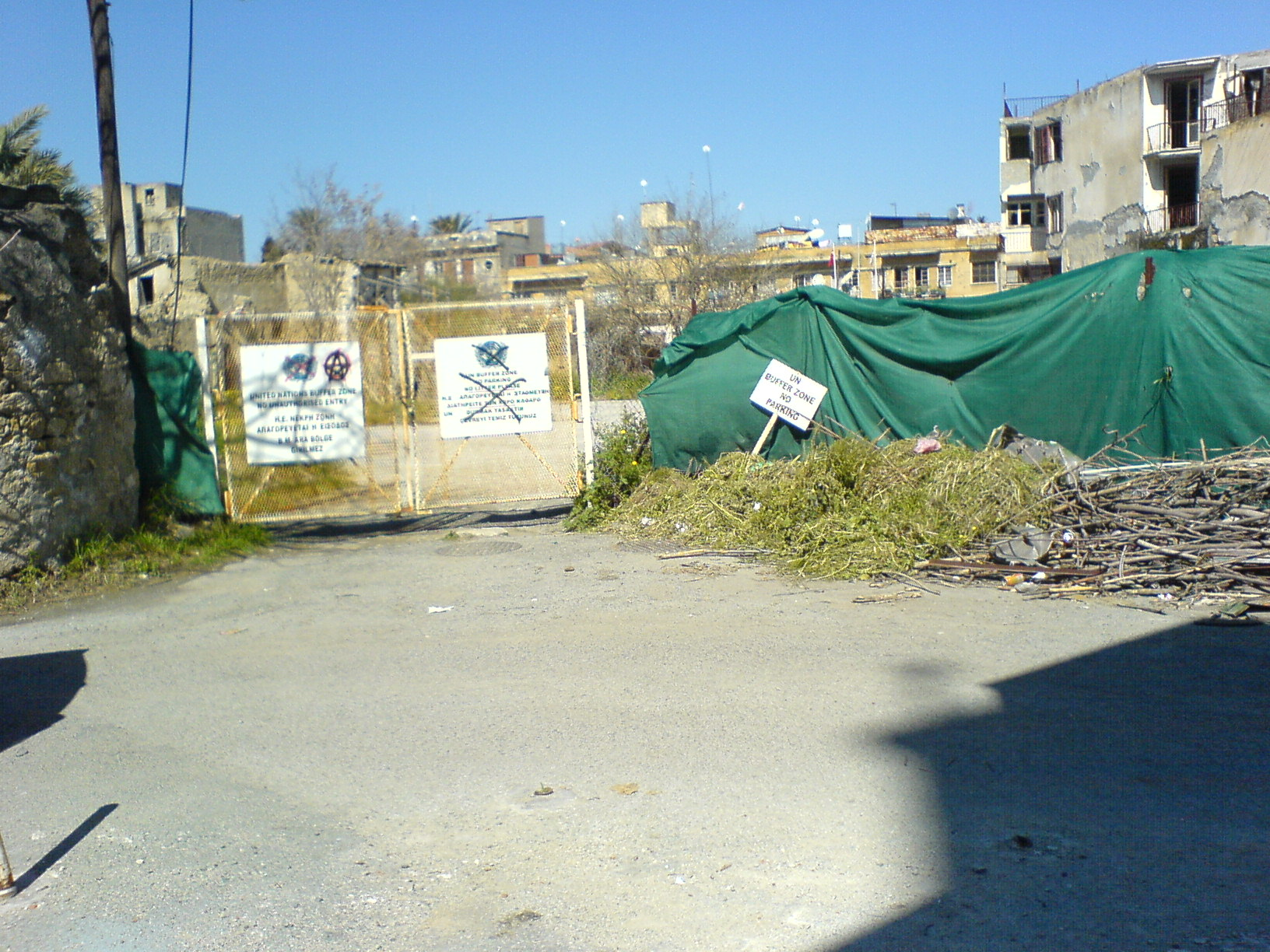
- Buffer zone in Nicosia
- Date: 10 January 2020
- Meeting no.: 8,700
- Code: S/RES/2504 (Document)
- Subject: Syria
- Voting summary: 11 voted for; None voted against; 4 abstained
- Result: Adopted

Security Council composition
- Permanent members: China; France; Russia; United Kingdom; United States
- Non-permanent members: Belgium; Dominican Republic; Estonia; Germany; Indonesia; Niger; St.Vincent–Grenadines; South Africa; Tunisia; Vietnam

United Nations Security Council resolution 2504 was adopted in 2020.

China, Russia, the United Kingdom, and the United States abstained from the vote.

== See also ==
- List of United Nations Security Council Resolutions 2501 to 2600 (2019–present)
