= United Nations Security Council Resolution 2585 =

United Nations Security Council Resolution adopted in 2021

UN Security Council Resolution 2585
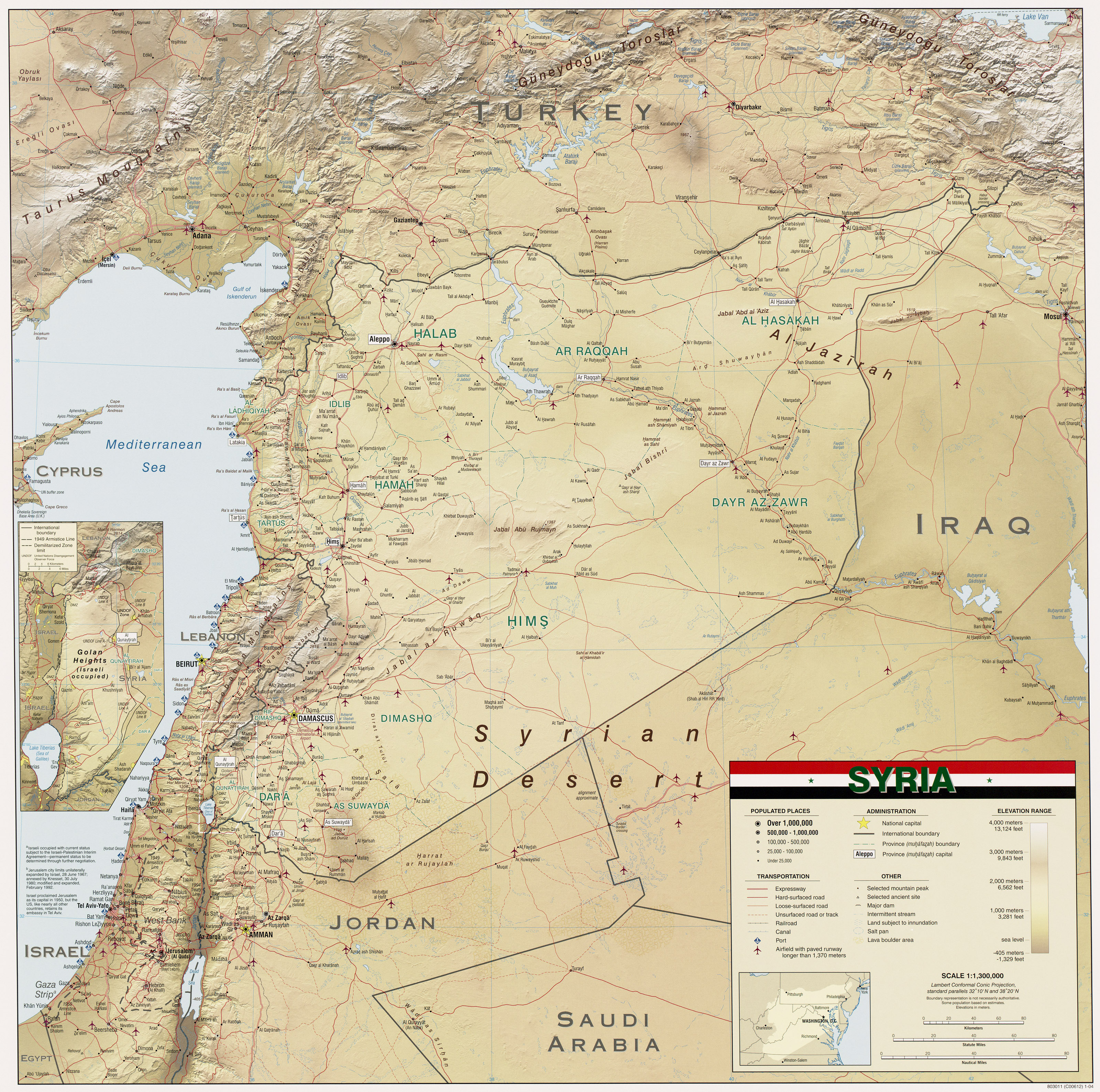
- Map of Syria
- Date: 9 July 2021
- Meeting no.: 8817
- Code: S/RES/2585 (Document)
- Subject: Renewal of mandate allowing UN agencies to coordinate and deliver aid cross-border from Turkey to northwestern Syria without Syrian government consent
- Voting summary: 15 voted for; None voted against; None abstained
- Result: Adopted

Security Council composition
- Permanent members: China; France; Russia; United Kingdom; United States
- Non-permanent members: Estonia; India; Ireland; Kenya; Mexico; Niger; Norway; St.Vincent–Grenadines; Tunisia; Vietnam

United Nations Security Council Resolution 2585 was passed by a unanimous vote on 9 July 2021, which allowed UN agencies to continue to coordinate and deliver aid cross-border from Turkey to northwestern Syria without Syrian government consent. Russia had threatened to veto renewal of the mandate to allow cross-border aid, but agreed to a compromise the day before the mandate was set to expire on 10 July 2021.
