= United Nations Security Council Resolution 2561 =

UN Security Council Resolution 2561
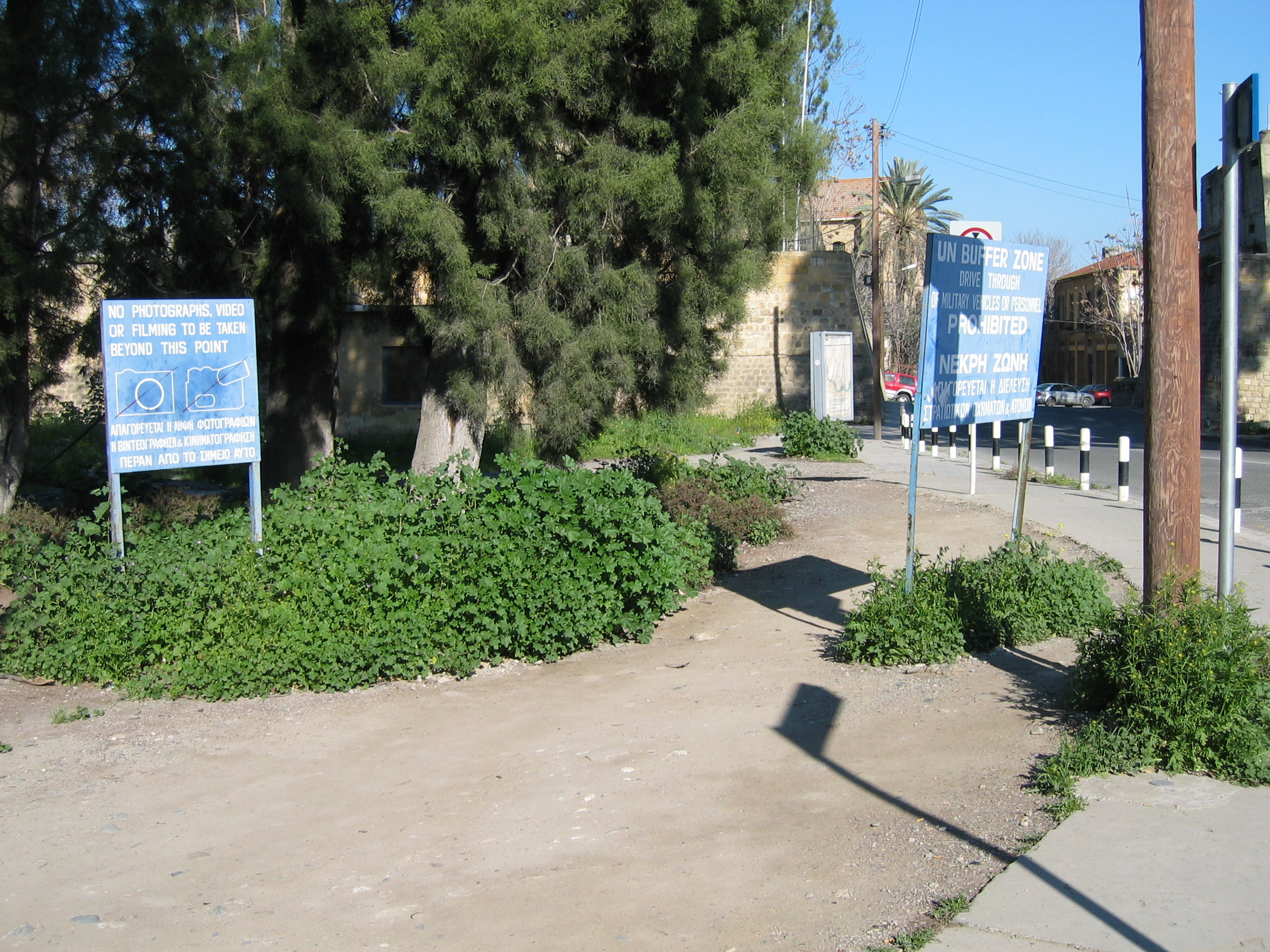
- Border in Nicosia
- Date: 29 January 2021
- Code: S/RES/2561 (Document)
- Subject: Extension of mandate of the peacekeeping force in Cyprus until 31 July 2021
- Voting summary: 15 voted for; None voted against; None abstained
- Result: Adopted

Security Council composition
- Permanent members: China; France; Russia; United Kingdom; United States
- Non-permanent members: Estonia; India; Ireland; Kenya; Mexico; Niger; Norway; St.Vincent–Grenadines; Tunisia; Vietnam

United Nations Security Council Resolution 2561 was passed by a unanimous vote on 29 January 2021. By means of the resolution, the Security Council extended the mandate of the United Nations Peacekeeping Force in Cyprus (UNFICYP) until 31 July 2021.
