= South Oran and Figuig Berber =

Cluster of the Zenati languages

South Oran and Figuig Berber Tachelhit
- tmaziɣt, tacelḥit, tabeldit
- Native to: Algeria, Morocco
- Region: Ksour Mountains, Saoura basin, Figuig region
- Native speakers: 61,000 in Algeria (2008); 20,000 to 30,000 in Morocco (2011?)
- Language family: Afro-Asiatic: Berber; Northern Berber; Zenati; Mzab–Wargla; South Oran and Figuig Berber Tachelhit
- Writing system: Arabic, Latin, Tifinagh

Language codes
- ISO 639-3: None (mis)
- Glottolog: sout3056 South Oran
- ELP: Figuig
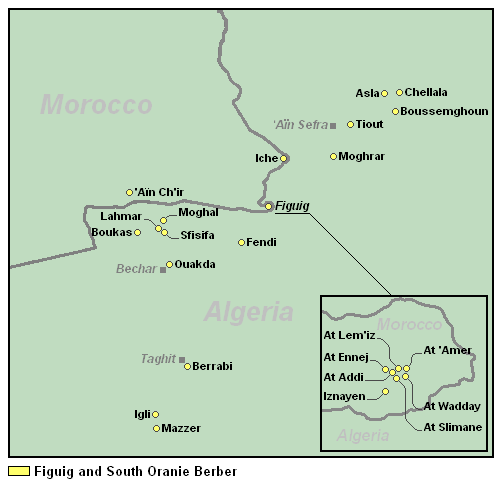

South Oran Berber, or Tachelhit, is a cluster of the Zenati languages, which belong to the Berber branch of the Afroasiatic family. It is spoken in a number of oases of southwestern Algeria and across the border in Morocco.

These areas include most of the ksour (fortified villages) between Mecheria and Béni Abbès: Tiout, Ain Sfisifa, Boussemghoun, Moghrar, Chellala, Asla, Fendi, Mougheul, Lahmar, Boukais, Sfissifa, Ouakda, Barrbi near Taghit, Igli, Mazzer in Algeria, Iche, Ain Chair and the seven ksour of Figuig (Ait Wadday, Ait Amar, Ait Lamiz, Ait Sliman, Ait Anaj, Ait Addi and Iznayen) in Morocco.

Of these towns, the only one whose dialect has been studied in any detail is Figuig (Kossmann 1997). A cursory study of the northern dialects, including texts and vocabulary, is Basset (1885, 1886) while a sketch grammar of its southernmost member, Igli, is provided by Kossmann (2010). El Idrissi (2017) focuses mainly on phonetic variation among the different villages.

Like many other Berber varieties, the Figuig Berber dialects use bipartite verbal negation. The preverbal negator is ul (locally un, il); the postverbal negator is ša (Igli, Mazzer) / šay (Figuig, Iche, Moghrar) / iš (Boussemghoun, Ain Chair), with both the latter two appearing as allomorphs in Tiout. The numerals 1 and 2 are Berber, while higher numerals are Arabic borrowings throughout.
