= El Menabha =

- Village
- Location within Algeria
- Coordinates: 32°0′59″N 2°16′11″W
- Country: Algeria
- Province: Béchar Province
- District: Lahmar District
- Commune: Mogheul
- Elevation: 991 m (3,251 ft)
- Time zone: UTC+1 (CET)

El Menabha (also written El Mena Bha or Menabha) is a village in the commune of Mogheul, in Lahmar District, Béchar Province, Algeria. The village lies north of Lahmar on the road to Mogheul town.
