= Oued Zouzfana =

River in Morocco and Algeria

Coordinates: 30.4864°N 2.3050°W

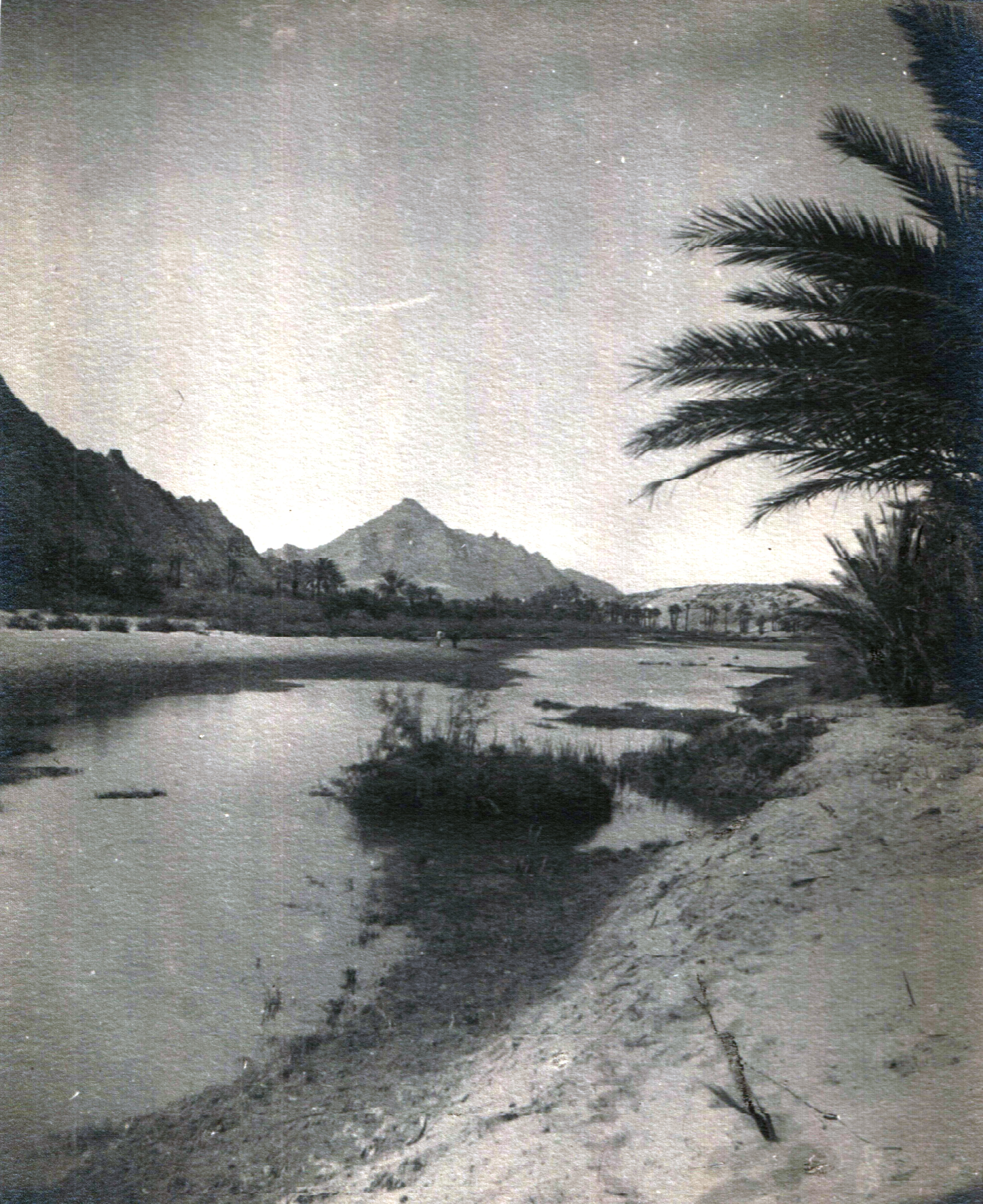
- Oued Zouzfana in January 1913

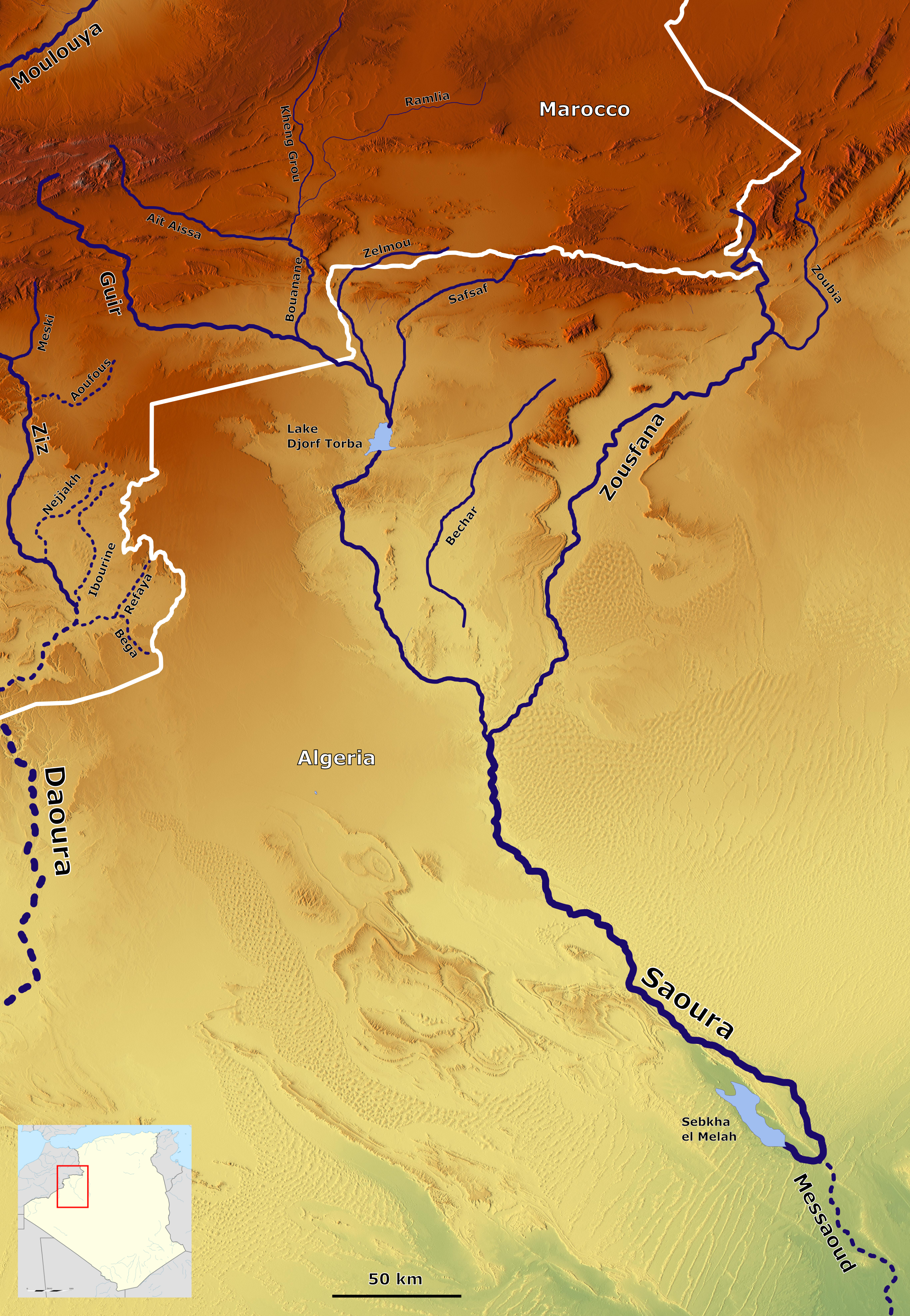
- The Saoura river system with the Zousfana (centre right)

Location
- Countries: Algeria and Morocco
- Towns: Figuig; Béni Ounif; Taghit; Igli

Physical characteristics
- Source
  - location: Saharan Atlas Mountains north of Figuig
- Mouth
  - location: Oued Saoura at Igli
  - elevation: 498 m (1,634 ft)

Oued Zouzfana is an intermittent river, or wadi, that flows through the Oriental region in southeastern Morocco and Béchar Province in southwestern Algeria.

== Course ==
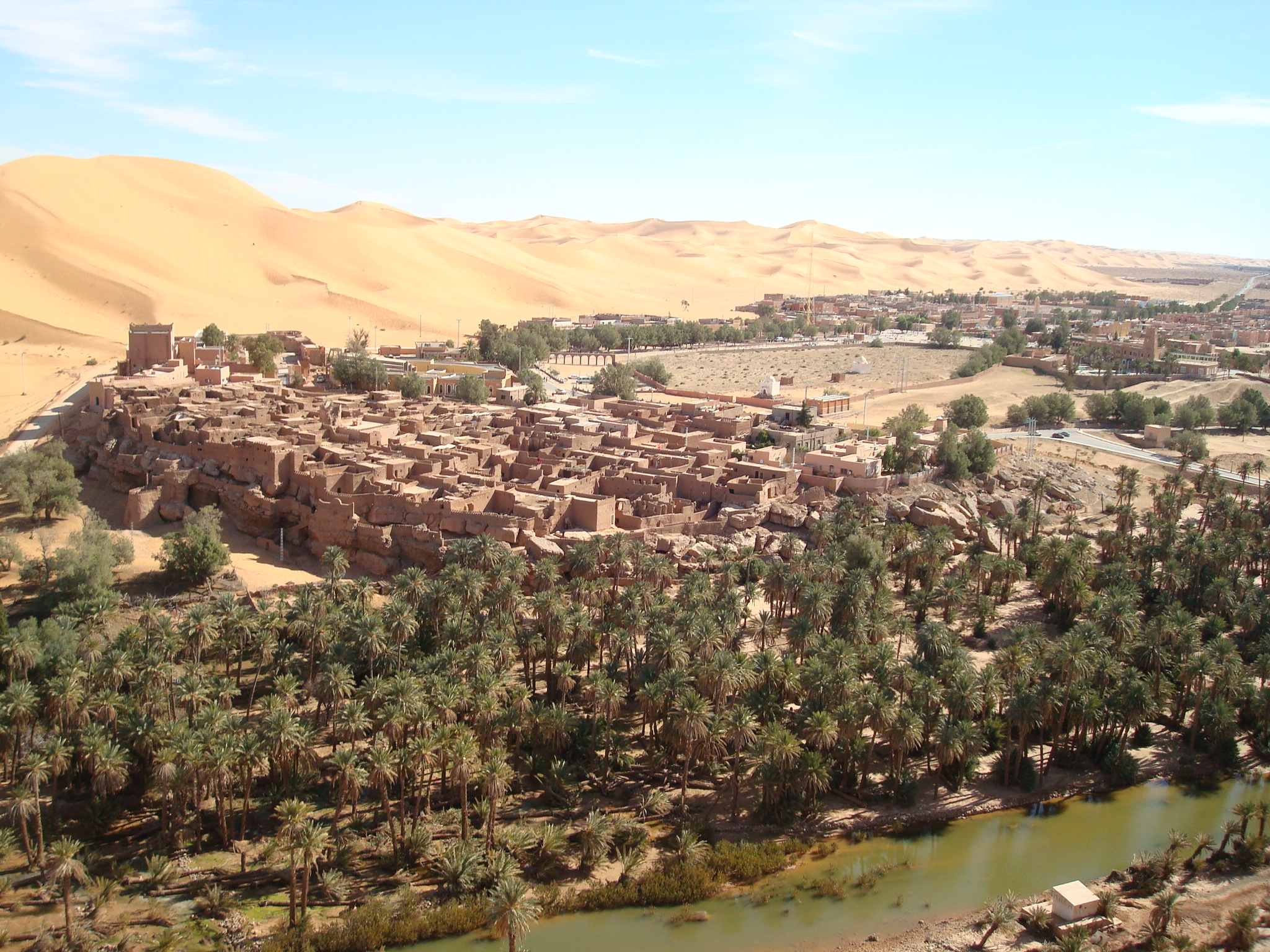
Oued Zouzfana and village of Taghit

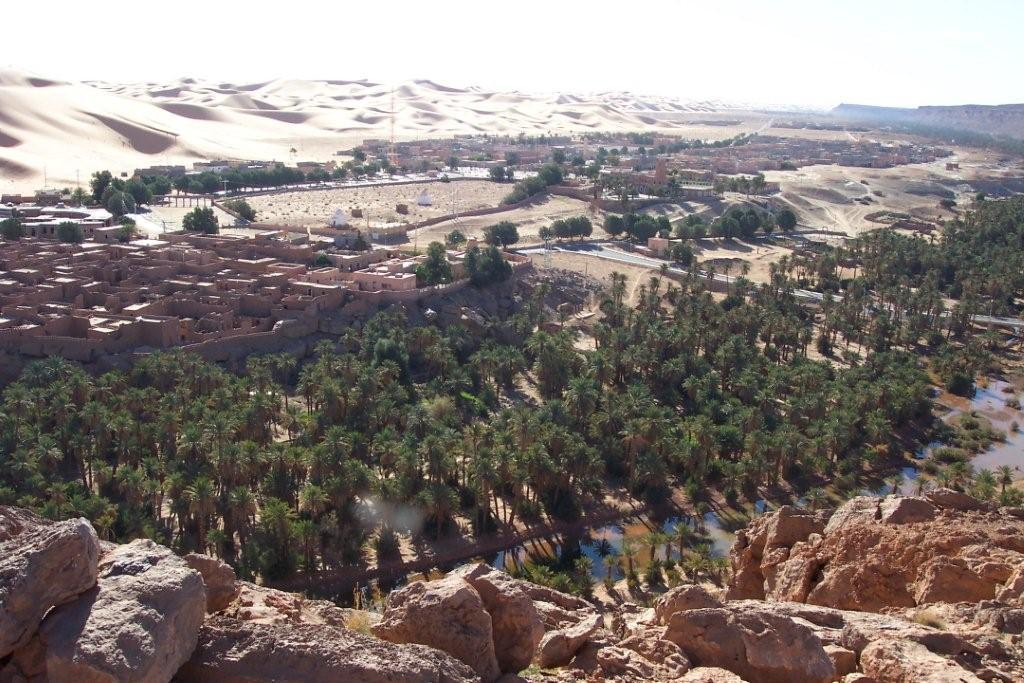
Zouzfana wadi at Taghit

The Oued Zouzfana originates in the Atlas Mountains north of the town of Figuig, flows south past Figuig and Béni Ounif, then turns southwest through Taghit and finally to Igli, where it merges with the Oued Guir to form the Oued Saoura. Oued Zouzfana passes by jbel Sidi Youssef which is located to the south of Figuig. The inhabitants of Figuig still cultivate date palms. Sometimes there are floods of this river. This phenomenon, if we may call it that; mainly because the Oued Zouzfana is not always carrying water with large quantities, occurs even when there is no rain in the region, since the cause of the flood is far from Figuig and near East side of the Atlas Mountains.
