= Kénadsa =

Kénadsa ﻗﻨﺎدﺳﺔ
- Commune and town
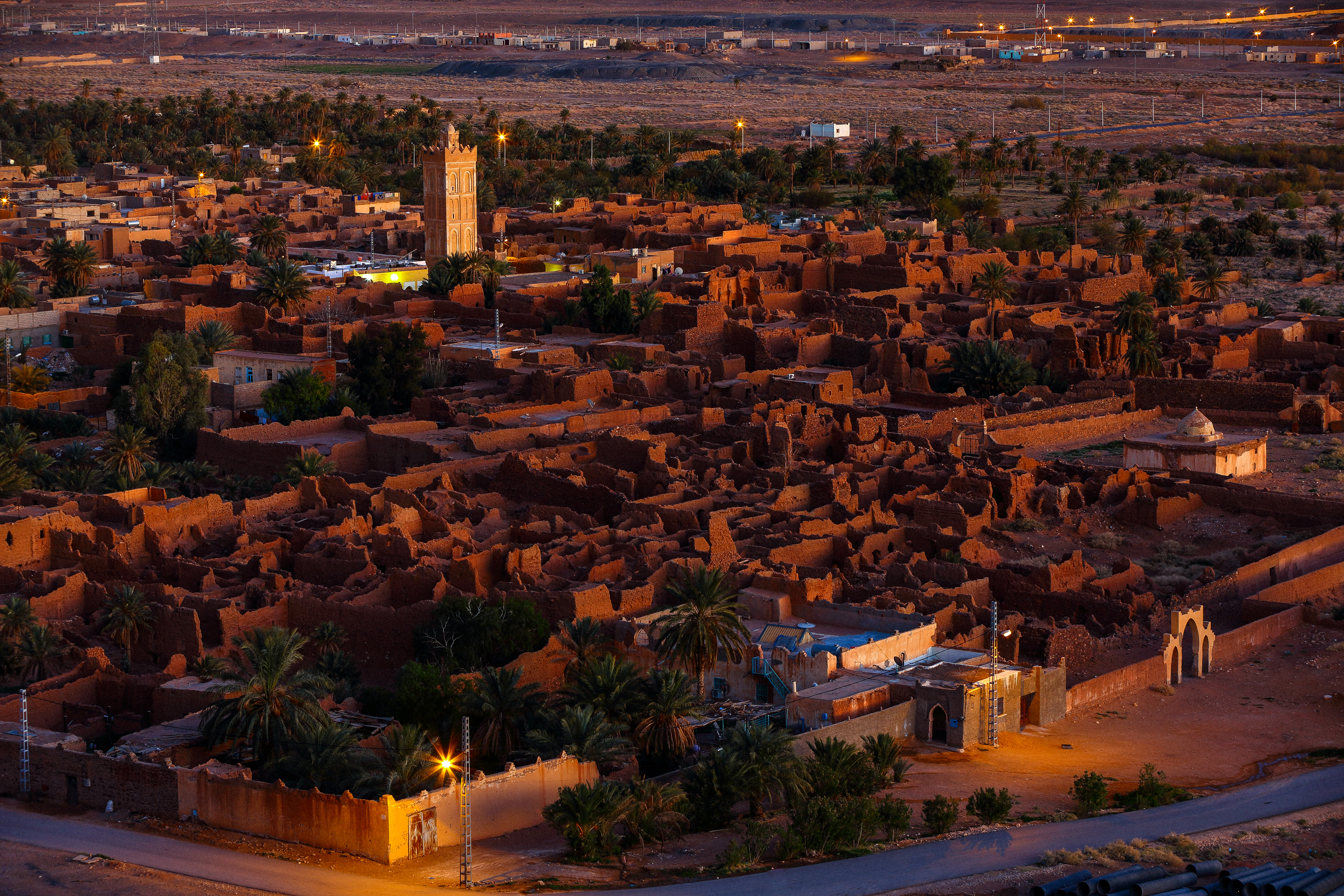
- Snow in Kénadsa

- Location of Kénadsa commune within Béchar Province

- Location of Kénadsa within Algeria
- Coordinates: 31°32′N 2°25′W
- Country: Algeria
- Province: Béchar Province
- District: Kénadsa District

Government
  - Mayor: Mohamed Metrani

Area
  - Total: 2,770 km^{2} (1,070 sq mi)
- Elevation: 784 m (2,572 ft)

Population (2008)
  - Total: 13,492
  - Density: 4.87/km^{2} (12.6/sq mi)
- Time zone: UTC+1 (CET)

Kénadsa is a town and commune in the Sahara Desert of south-western Algeria, and is the capital of Kénadsa District, Béchar Province. As of 2008, Kénadsa had a population of 13,492, up from 11,667 in 1998, and an annual growth rate of 1.5%. The commune covers an area of 2,770 square kilometres (1,070 sq mi).

There is a large longwave broadcasting station near Kénadsa.

== Geography ==
Kénadsa lies at an elevation of 784 metres (2,572 ft) on the flat rocky hamada west of Béchar. The wadi Oued Meswar is located about 6 kilometres (3.7 mi) west of the town, and meets the Oued Guir near Abadla at the locality of Ksi Ksou.

== Climate ==
Kénadsa has a hot desert climate (Köppen: BWh), with extremely hot summers and mild winters, and very little precipitation throughout the year.

Climate data for Kénadsa
Month	Jan	Feb	Mar	Apr	May	Jun	Jul	Aug	Sep	Oct	Nov	Dec	Year
Mean daily maximum °C (°F)	15.9 (60.6)	19.2 (66.6)	22.5 (72.5)	27.1 (80.8)	31.4 (88.5)	36 (97)	40.5 (104.9)	39.4 (102.9)	34.3 (93.7)	27.5 (81.5)	20.4 (68.7)	16.8 (62.2)	27.6 (81.7)
Daily mean °C (°F)	8.9 (48.0)	12 (54)	15.4 (59.7)	19.9 (67.8)	24.1 (75.4)	28.8 (83.8)	33 (91)	32.2 (90.0)	27.4 (81.3)	20.7 (69.3)	14.2 (57.6)	9.9 (49.8)	20.5 (69.0)
Mean daily minimum °C (°F)	2 (36)	4.8 (40.6)	8.4 (47.1)	12.7 (54.9)	16.8 (62.2)	21.6 (70.9)	25.5 (77.9)	25 (77)	20.5 (68.9)	14 (57)	8 (46)	3.1 (37.6)	13.5 (56.3)
Average precipitation mm (inches)	9 (0.4)	8 (0.3)	9 (0.4)	8 (0.3)	5 (0.2)	4 (0.2)	1 (0.0)	3 (0.1)	7 (0.3)	12 (0.5)	12 (0.5)	10 (0.4)	88 (3.6)
Source: Climate-Data.org, altitude: 750m

== Economy ==
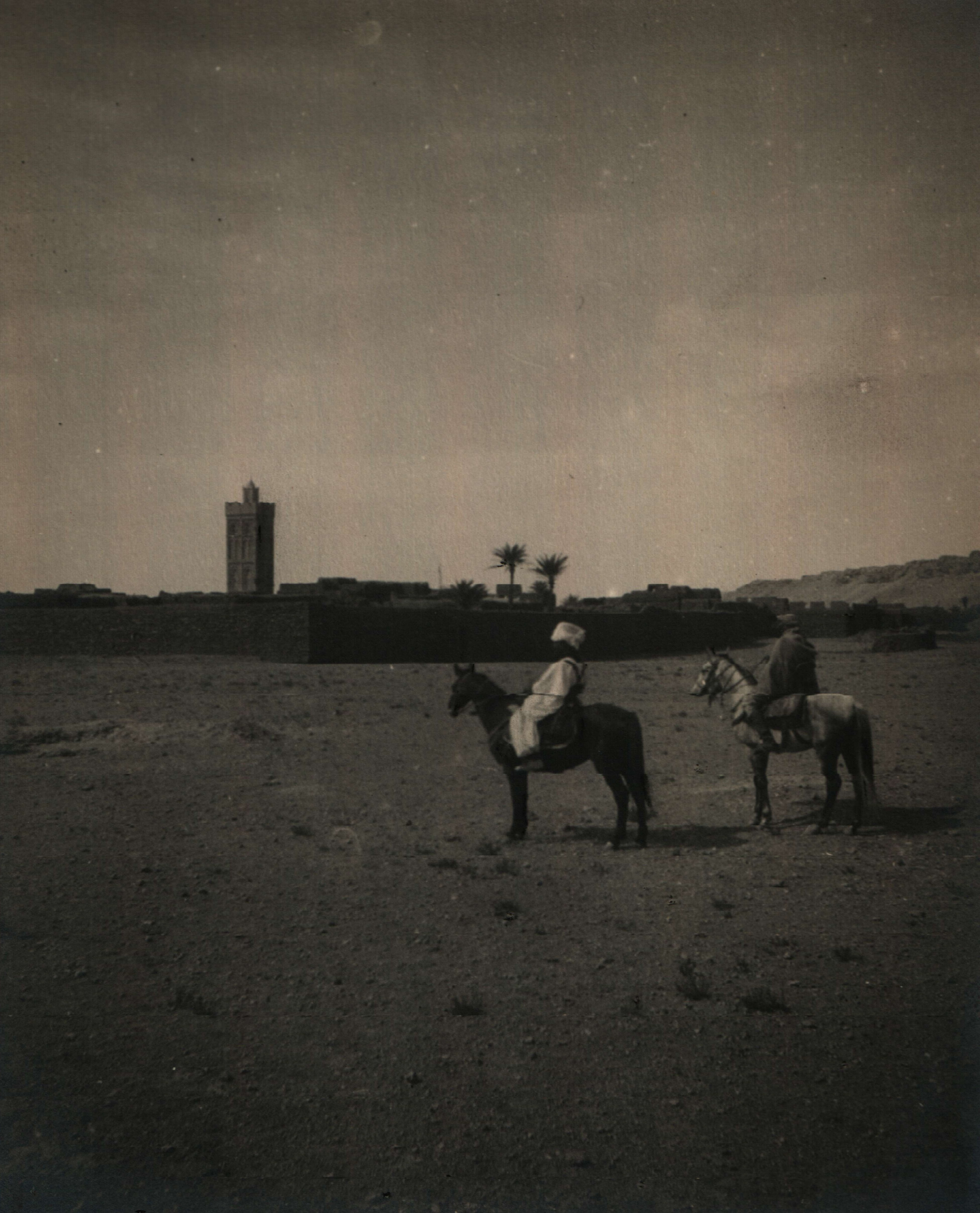
Kénadsa in January 1913

Agriculture is an important industry in Kénadsa. The commune has a total of 1,850 hectares (4,600 acres) of arable land, but only 150 hectares (370 acres) is irrigated. There are a total of 67,000 date palms planted in the commune. As of 2009 there were 3,757 sheep, 4,592 goats, 1,507 camels, and 163 cattle. There were also 4000 chickens in 22 buildings.

There is some tourism in Kénadsa; attractions include sand dunes, palm groves, the old ksar and forts, and the dam across the Oued Meswar. Visitors to Kénadsa typically stay in Béchar since there are no hotels in Kénadsa.

There are also bituminous coal fields near Kénadsa. They were originally discovered in 1907, but mining activity did not begin until 1917. Output peaked in the 1940s and has declined since, due to competition from oil and gas fields in eastern Algeria. There are also deposits of lead, manganese and iron ore nearby, but these are largely unused.

== Infrastructure and housing ==
100% of Kénadsa's population is connected to drinking water and to the sewerage system, 97% (including 2,707 buildings) have access to electricity. There are two fuel service stations in the town.

Kénadsa has a total of 2,613 houses, of which 2,142 are occupied, giving an occupation rate of 6.3 inhabitants per occupied building.

== Transportation ==
Kénadsa lies on a local road connecting Méridja to the west with Béchar to the east. Kénadsa is 20 kilometres (12 mi) from Béchar and 60 kilometres (37 mi) from Méridja.

There is a total length of 64.4 kilometres (40.0 mi) of roads in the commune.

== Education ==
There are 4 elementary schools, with 65 classrooms including 48 in use. There are a total of 2,562 school students.

7.2% of the population has a tertiary education, and another 22.6% has competed secondary education. The overall literacy rate is 84.6%, and is 91.2% among men and 78.2% among women.

== Health ==
Kénadsa has 5 room care facilities and a maternity ward; for other health care residents must travel to Béchar.

== Culture ==
Kénadsa has a cinema with 350 seats.

Notable authors born in Kénadsa include Yasmina Khadra, Malika Mokeddem, and Pierre Rabhi.

== Religion ==
Kénadsa has 3 operational mosques, with another 2 under construction.

== Localities ==
The commune is composed of three localities:

- Kenadsa
- Barrage Djorf Torba
- Masky
