= Sfissifa, Béchar =

Sfissifa صفيصيفة
- Village
- Location within Algeria
- Coordinates: 31°55′54″N 2°13′2″W
- Country: Algeria
- Province: Béchar Province
- District: Lahmar District
- Commune: Lahmar
- Elevation: 965 m (3,166 ft)
- Time zone: UTC+1 (CET)

Sfissifa (Arabic: صفيصيفة) (also written Souissifa) is a village in south-western Algeria. It is part of the commune of Lahmar, in Béchar Province, Algeria, and is 3 kilometres (1.9 mi) east of the town of Lahmar. The village lies at the western end of the Djebel Antar mountain range, and is about 30 kilometres (19 mi) north of the provincial capital Béchar.
