= Zoubia, Algeria =

Zoubia
- Commune
- Location within Algeria
- Coordinates: 32°8′42″N 0°59′57″W
- Country: Algeria
- Province: Béchar Province
- District: Béni Ounif District
- Commune: Béni Ounif
- Elevation: 869 m (2,851 ft)
- Time zone: UTC+1 (CET)

Zoubia is a village in south-western Algeria. It is part of the commune of Béni Ounif, in Béchar Province, Algeria, and is 25 kilometres (16 mi) northeast of the town of Béni Ounif.
