= Méridja =

Méridja ﻣﺮﻳﺠﺔ
- Commune and town
- Location of Méridja commune within Béchar Province

- Location of Méridja within Algeria
- Coordinates: 31°33′N 2°57′W
- Country: Algeria
- Province: Béchar Province
- District: Kénadsa District

Area
  - Total: 2,270 km^{2} (880 sq mi)
- Elevation: 782 m (2,566 ft)

Population (2008)
  - Total: 592
  - Density: 0.261/km^{2} (0.675/sq mi)
- Time zone: UTC+1 (CET)

Méridja (Arabic: ﻣﺮﻳﺠﺔ, little swamp) is a town and commune in Kénadsa District, Béchar Province, in western Algeria. As of 2008 the population of the commune was 592, up from 532 in 1998, with an annual growth rate of 1.1%. This makes it the smallest commune by population in Béchar Province. The commune covers an area of 2,270 square kilometres (880 sq mi).

== Geography ==
Méridja is located at an elevation of 782 metres (2,566 ft) on the extensive hamada west of Béchar, about 15 kilometres (9.3 mi) west of the Djorf Torba dam on the Oued Guir. Some low, rocky hills rise both to the north and south of the town, but there are no significant mountains in the immediate vicinity of the town.

== Climate ==
Méridja has a hot desert climate (Köppen climate classification BWh), with extremely hot summers and cool winters, and very little precipitation throughout the year.

Climate data for Meridja Tahtania
Month	Jan	Feb	Mar	Apr	May	Jun	Jul	Aug	Sep	Oct	Nov	Dec	Year
Record high °C (°F)	23 (73)	27 (81)	31 (88)	34 (93)	38 (100)	42 (108)	45 (113)	45 (113)	41 (106)	36 (97)	29 (84)	26 (79)	45 (113)
Mean daily maximum °C (°F)	15 (59)	18 (64)	22 (72)	26 (79)	30 (86)	35 (95)	40 (104)	38 (100)	33 (91)	27 (81)	20 (68)	16 (61)	27 (80)
Daily mean °C (°F)	8 (46)	11 (52)	15 (59)	19 (66)	23 (73)	28 (82)	32 (90)	31 (88)	26 (79)	20 (68)	13 (55)	9 (48)	20 (67)
Mean daily minimum °C (°F)	1 (34)	4 (39)	8 (46)	12 (54)	16 (61)	21 (70)	25 (77)	25 (77)	20 (68)	13 (55)	7 (45)	2 (36)	13 (55)
Record low °C (°F)	−4 (25)	−3 (27)	−1 (30)	2 (36)	7 (45)	10 (50)	17 (63)	16 (61)	9 (48)	3 (37)	0 (32)	−6 (21)	−6 (21)
Average precipitation mm (inches)	8 (0.3)	10 (0.4)	13 (0.5)	8 (0.3)	3 (0.1)	3 (0.1)	0 (0)	5 (0.2)	8 (0.3)	15 (0.6)	13 (0.5)	10 (0.4)	96 (3.7)
Average relative humidity (%)	54	44	37	33	29	23	17	21	29	40	49	56	36
Source: Weatherbase

== Economy ==
Agriculture is an important industry in Méridja. The commune has a total of 240 hectares (590 acres) of arable land, of which 132 hectares (330 acres) is irrigated. There are a total of 10,020 date palms planted in the commune. Animal husbandry is particularly significant; as of 2009 there were 1,758 sheep, 2,182 goats, 2,033 camels, and 180 cattle. There were also 52,800 chickens in 6 buildings.

== Infrastructure and housing ==
100% of Méridja's population is connected to drinking water, 100% is connected to the sewerage system, but only 81% (including 135 buildings) have access to electricity, the equal lowest rate of electrification in the province with El Ouata. There are no fuel service stations in the town; the nearest is in Kénadsa.

Méridja has a total of 148 houses, of which 103 are occupied, giving an occupation rate of 5.7 inhabitants per occupied building.

== Transportation ==
A road leads west out of the town past the Djorf Torba dam to Kénadsa and the provincial capital Béchar, which is 80 kilometres (50 mi) away.

There is a total length of 26.1 kilometres (16.2 mi) of roads in the commune.

== Education ==
There is 1 elementary school, with 6 classrooms, all of which are in use. There are a total of 103 school students. Secondary students must travel to Kénadsa to study.

2.6% of the population has a tertiary education (the second lowest in the province), and another 11.9% has competed secondary education. The overall literacy rate is 76.6%, and is 83.3% among males and 68.0% among females.

== Health ==
Méridja has 2 polyclinics and a room care facility. The nearest hospital is in Béchar.

== Religion ==
Méridja has one operational mosque.

== Sports ==
The town is home to association football club JS Saoura which currently plays in the Algerian Ligue Professionnelle 1.

== Localities ==
The commune is composed of two localities:

- Meridja
- Tibarbatine
