= Fendi, Algeria =

Fendi
- Commune
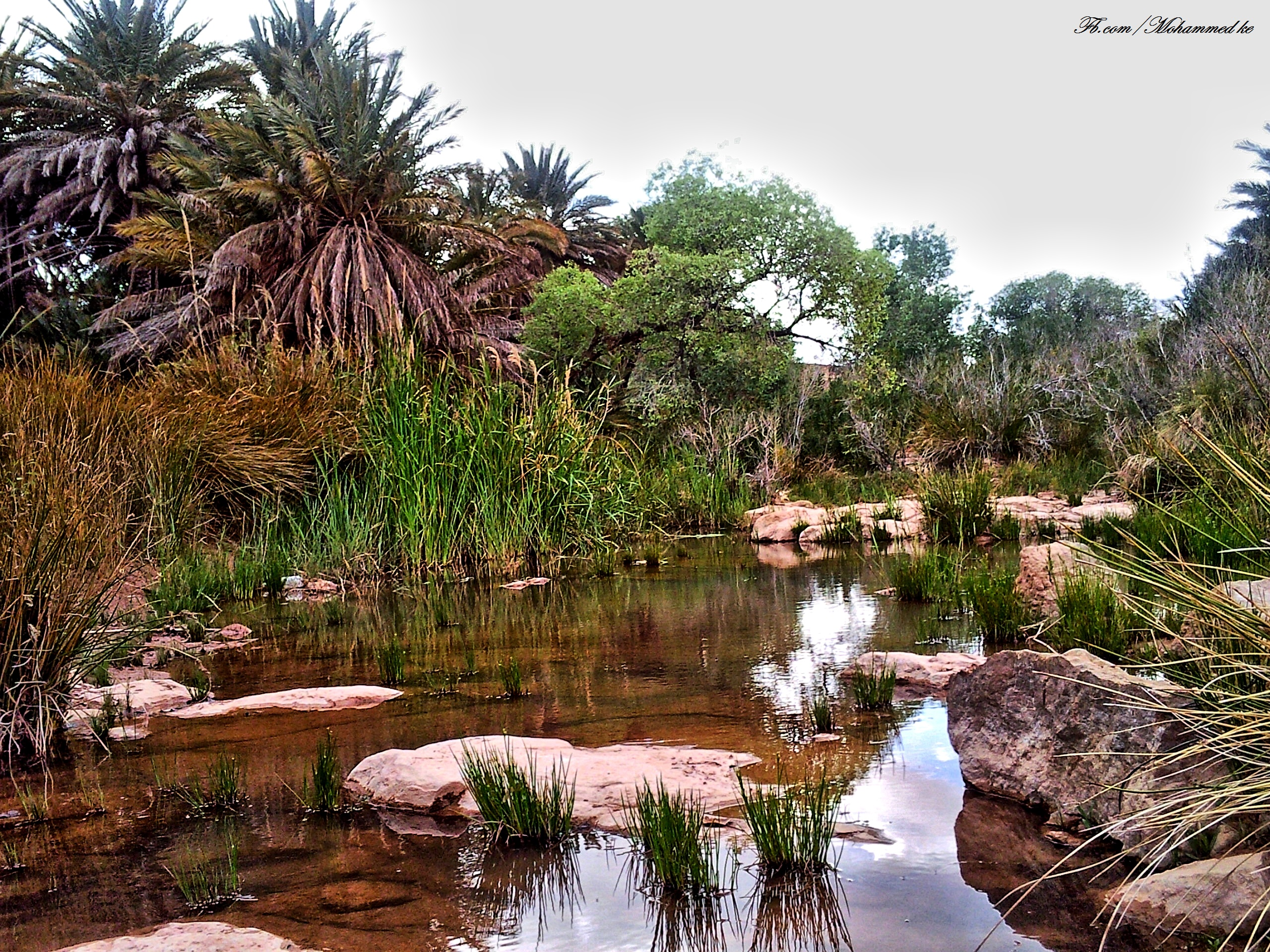

- Location within Algeria
- Coordinates: 31°50′26″N 1°28′40″W
- Country: Algeria
- Province: Béchar Province
- District: Béni Ounif District
- Commune: Béni Ounif
- Elevation: 792 m (2,598 ft)
- Time zone: UTC+1 (CET)

Fendi is a village in the commune of Béni Ounif, in Béni Ounif District, Béchar Province, Algeria. The village is located next to a wadi at the end of a local road leading south from its intersection with the N6 highway west of Béni Ounif. It is 75 kilometres (47 mi) east of Béchar and 32 kilometres (20 mi) southwest of Béni Ounif.
