= Méchraâ Houari Boumédienne =

Méchraâ Houari Boumédienne مشرع ھوارى بومدين
- Commune and town
- Location of Méchraâ Houari Boumédienne commune within Béchar Province

- Location of Méchraâ Houari Boumédienne within Algeria
- Coordinates: 30°55′56″N 2°44′15″W
- Country: Algeria
- Province: Béchar Province
- District: Abadla District

Area
  - Total: 2,820 km^{2} (1,090 sq mi)
- Elevation: 572 m (1,877 ft)

Population (2008)
  - Total: 3,091
  - Density: 1.10/km^{2} (2.84/sq mi)
- Time zone: UTC+1 (CET)

Méchraâ Houari Boumédienne (Arabic: مشرع ھوارى بومدين) is a town and commune in Abadla District, Béchar Province, in western Algeria. According to the 2008 census its population is 3,091, down from 3,133 in 1998, with an annual growth rate of -0.1%. The commune covers an area of 2,820 square kilometres (1,090 sq mi).

== Etymology ==
The town is named after Houari Boumediene, a former president of Algeria.

== Geography ==
Méchraâ Houari Boumédienne lies at an elevation of 572m to the west of the Oued Guir, an intermittent wadi, and just south of the town of Abadla. From here through Abadla to Erg Ferradj is the site of an extensive 3000 hectare palm plantation.

== Climate ==
Méchraâ Houari Boumédienne has a hot desert climate, with extremely hot summers and cool winters, and very little precipitation throughout the year.

== Economy ==
Agriculture is the main industry in Méchraâ Houari Boumédienne. The commune has a total of 2,030 hectares (5,000 acres) of arable land, of which 1,856 hectares (4,590 acres) is irrigated. There are a total of 41,850 date palms planted in the commune. As of 2009 there were 791 sheep, 2,986 goats, 1,636 camels, and 10 cattle. There were also 14,600 chickens in 6 buildings.

== Infrastructure and housing ==
100% of Méchraâ Houari Boumédienne's population is connected to drinking water, 99% is connected to the sewerage system, and 83% (including 555 buildings) have access to electricity. There are no fuel service stations in the town; the nearest is in Abadla.

Méchraâ Houari Boumédienne has a total of 759 houses, of which 511 are occupied, giving an occupation rate of 6.0 inhabitants per occupied building.

== Transportation ==
Méchraâ Houari Boumédienne is on the N6 national highway between Béchar to the northeast and Adrar to the southeast. The town of Abadla is on the highway to the north, while to the south the towns of Igli, Béni Abbès and others can be accessed. The N50 highway leaves the N6 to the west just to the north of Méchraâ Houari Boumédienne; it eventually leads to Tindouf, passing Hamaguir and Tinfouchy on the way.

Méchraâ Houari Boumédienne is 20 kilometres (12 mi) from Abadla, and 111 kilometres (69 mi) from the provincial capital, Béchar.

There is a total length of 147 kilometres (91 mi) of roads in the commune.

== Education ==
There are 2 elementary schools, with 24 classrooms including 14 in use. There are a total of 732 school students.

3.6% of the population has a tertiary education, and another 13.8% has competed secondary education. The overall literacy rate is 63.9%, and is 70.2% among males and 57.7% among females. The rate for males is the lowest in the province, and the rates overall and for females are the second lowest.

== Health ==
Méchraâ Houari Boumédienne has a hospital, which is a central focus of healthcare for Abadla district and Tabelbala. There are also a polyclinic, a room care facility, and a medical operating theatre.

== Religion ==
Méchraâ Houari Boumédienne has 2 operational mosques.
