= Houari Boumédiène (disambiguation) =

Houari Boumédiène, also transcribed Boumediene, Boumedienne etc. (1932–1978), served as Chairman of the Revolutionary Council of Algeria from 19 June 1965 until 12 December 1976 and thereafter as the second President of Algeria until his death on 27 December 1978

There are a number of institutions in honour of him, for instance:

- Méchraâ Houari Boumédienne, a town and commune in Abadla District, Béchar Province, in western Algeria
- Houari Boumediene Airport, Algerian airport
- University of Science and Technology Houari Boumediene, Algerian university
