= Igli, Algeria =

Igli إقلي
- Commune and town
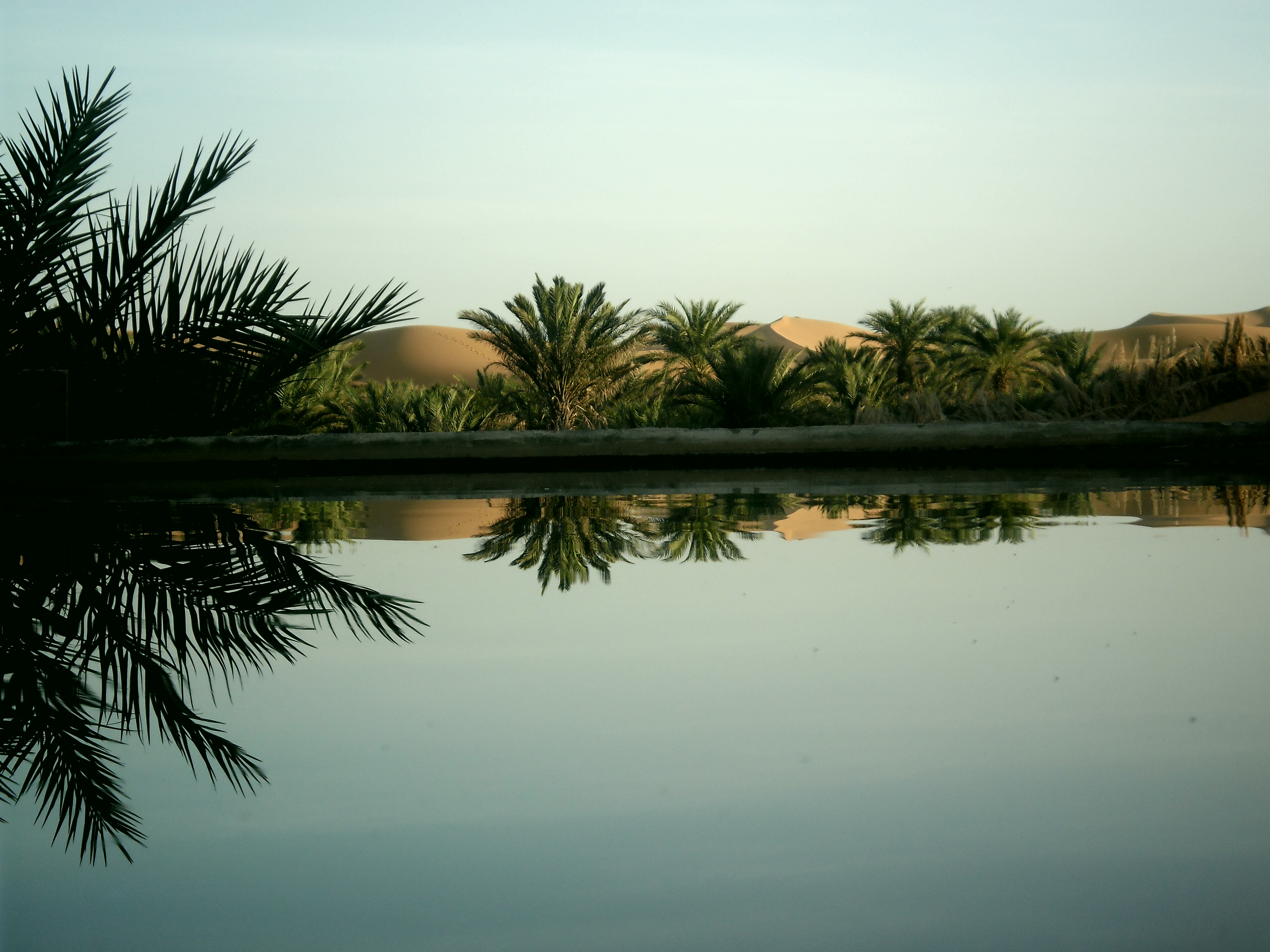

- Location of Igli commune within Béchar Province

- Location of Igli within Algeria
- Coordinates: 30°27′0″N 2°18′33″W
- Country: Algeria
- Province: Béchar Province
- District: Igli District

Area
  - Total: 6,220 km^{2} (2,400 sq mi)
- Elevation: 507 m (1,663 ft)

Population (2008)
  - Total: 6,682
  - Density: 1.07/km^{2} (2.78/sq mi)
- Time zone: UTC+1 (CET)

Igli (Arabic: إقلي) is a town and commune in Béchar Province, western Algeria, located 152 km south of Bechar. It is coextensive with Igli District. Its population was 6,682 as of the 2008 census, up from 5,474 in 1998, and an annual population growth rate of 2.1%. The commune covers an area of 6,220 square kilometres (2,400 sq mi).

Its inhabitants, along with those of the small neighbouring town of Mazzer, speak a Zenati Berber language termed tabəldit, closely related to that of other south-western Algerian ksars and of Figuig.

== Geography ==
Igli lies on the left (eastern) bank of the Oued Saoura in the Saoura valley, just south of the confluence of Oued Guir and Oued Zouzfana. The Grand Erg Occidental, a large area of continuous sand dunes lies to the east, while the Hamada, a broad rocky plateau, lies across the river to the west.

== Climate ==
Igli has a hot desert climate, with extremely hot summers and mild winters, and very little precipitation throughout the year.

Climate data for Igli
Month	Jan	Feb	Mar	Apr	May	Jun	Jul	Aug	Sep	Oct	Nov	Dec	Year
Mean daily maximum °C (°F)	18.2 (64.8)	21.5 (70.7)	25.3 (77.5)	29.9 (85.8)	34.5 (94.1)	39.7 (103.5)	43.7 (110.7)	42.0 (107.6)	37.1 (98.8)	30.1 (86.2)	23.2 (73.8)	18.7 (65.7)	30.3 (86.6)
Daily mean °C (°F)	10.6 (51.1)	13.8 (56.8)	17.7 (63.9)	22.1 (71.8)	26.6 (79.9)	31.7 (89.1)	35.6 (96.1)	34.2 (93.6)	29.8 (85.6)	23.0 (73.4)	16.6 (61.9)	11.8 (53.2)	22.8 (73.0)
Mean daily minimum °C (°F)	3.5 (38.3)	6.2 (43.2)	10.2 (50.4)	14.3 (57.7)	18.8 (65.8)	23.8 (74.8)	27.5 (81.5)	26.5 (79.7)	22.5 (72.5)	15.9 (60.6)	10.0 (50.0)	5.0 (41.0)	15.4 (59.6)
Average precipitation mm (inches)	12 (0.5)	8 (0.3)	12 (0.5)	7 (0.3)	4 (0.2)	2 (0.1)	1 (0.0)	2 (0.1)	5 (0.2)	9 (0.4)	11 (0.4)	11 (0.4)	84 (3.4)
Source: climate-data.org

== Economy ==
Agriculture is an important industry in Igli. The commune has a total of 1,130 hectares (2,800 acres) of arable land, of which 1,002 hectares (2,480 acres) is irrigated. There are a total of 75,450 date palms planted in the commune. As of 2009 there were 4,652 sheep, 1,785 goats, 401 camels, and 5 cattle.

Local tourist attractions include palm groves, the old ksar, and local caves.

== Infrastructure and housing ==
90% of Igli's population is connected to drinking water, 95% is connected to the sewerage system, and 99% (including 1,728 buildings) have access to electricity. There is one fuel service station in the town.

Igli has a total of 1,425 houses, of which 972 are occupied, giving an occupation rate of 6.9 inhabitants per occupied building.

== Transportation ==
Igli is connected by a local road to the N6 national highway between Béchar to the north and Adrar to the southeast. Abadla is accessible to the north via the N6, while to the south the towns of El Ouata, Béni Abbès and Kerzaz, among others can be accessed. Igli is 153 kilometres (95 mi) from the provincial capital, Béchar.

There is a total length of 147 kilometres (91 mi) of roads in the commune.

== Education ==
There are 4 elementary schools, with 36 classrooms including 23 in use. There are a total of 1,282 school students.

9.8% of the population has a tertiary education (the highest in the province), and another 19.8% has competed secondary education. The overall literacy rate is 84.3%, and is 88.3% among males and 79.9% among females.

== Health ==
Igli has one polyclinic, 3 room care facilities, and a maternity ward.

== Religion ==
Igli has 3 operational mosques, with another 3 under construction.

== Localities ==
The commune is composed of three localities:

- Igli
- Touzdit
- Mazzer

The locality of Mazzer is located about 15 kilometres (9.3 mi) south of Igli on the eastern bank of the Oued Saoura.
