= Abadla District =

Abadla District دائرة العبادلة
- District
- Location of Abadla District within Béchar Province
- Coordinates: 31°1′N 2°44′E
- Country: Algeria
- Province: Béchar
- District seat: Abadla

Area
  - Total: 12,100 km^{2} (4,700 sq mi)

Population (1998)
  - Total: 18,648
  - Density: 1.54/km^{2} (3.99/sq mi)
- Time zone: UTC+01 (CET)
- Municipalities: 3

Abadla is a district in Béchar Province, Algeria. It seat and the largest city is Abadla. According to the 2008 census, the total population of the district was 21,133 inhabitants. Most of the population of the region is clustered around the Oued Guir, the main water source for the district. The N6 national highway runs through the district on its way from Béchar to Adrar; the N50 branches off near Abadla, leading to Tindouf.

== Geography ==
Abadla is situated in Béchar Province, on a flat plateau alternating between sandy desert and irrigated oases along the Oued Guir. The district comprises a plateau crossed by rocky outcrops, inland depressions, and rugged terrain in the Gara el Betick and Djorf Torba regions. The commune of Abadla covers an area of 2,870 km^{2} (1,110 sq mi). The elevation ranges from about 567 to 775 m (1,860 to 2,543 ft). The district's climate is classified as a hot desert climate (Köppen climate classification BWh), characterized by extremely hot summers, cool winters, and very low precipitation throughout the year.

The district is further divided into three communes: Abadla, Méchraâ Houari Boumédienne, and Erg Ferradj.

== Demographics ==
According to the 2008 census, the total population of the district was 21,133 inhabitants.

== Transportation ==
Abadla is served by National Highways N6 (Béchar to Adrar), N50 (to Tindouf), and N52, making it a transit corridor between northern and southern Wilayas . In April 2025, the new Béchar–Abadla railway line was inaugurated by the President of Algeria. This 100-kilometer rail project aims to enhance transport connectivity and help in the economic improvement of the region by easing the movement of goods and people and reducing transportation costs.
