= Erg Ferradj =

Erg Ferradj ﻋﺮق ﻓﺮاج
- Commune and town
- Location of Erg Ferradj commune within Béchar Province

- Location of Erg Ferradj within Algeria
- Coordinates: 31°2′5″N 2°47′29″W
- Country: Algeria
- Province: Béchar Province

Area
  - Total: 6,410 km^{2} (2,470 sq mi)
- Elevation: 589 m (1,932 ft)

Population (2008)
  - Total: 4,406
- Time zone: UTC+1 (CET)

Erg Ferradj (Arabic: ﻋﺮق ﻓﺮاج) is a town and commune in Abadla District, Béchar Province, in western Algeria. According to the 2008 census its population is 4,406, down from 4,670 in 1998, and an annual population growth rate of -0.6%, the second lowest in the province. The commune covers an area of 6,410 square kilometres (2,470 sq mi).

== Geography ==
Erg Ferradj lies at an elevation of 589 metres (1,932 ft) to the west of an extensive palm plantation covering 3000 hectares lying along the western side of the Oued Guir. The rocky hills of the hamada are found on both sides of the river, but are more dramatic on the eastern side.

== Climate ==
Erg Ferradj has a hot desert climate, with extremely hot summers and cool winters, and very little precipitation throughout the year.

== Economy ==
Agriculture is the main industry in Erg Ferradj. The commune has a total of 2,560 hectares (6,300 acres) of arable land found mainly to the east of the town, of which 2,050 hectares (5,100 acres) is irrigated. There are a total of 116,040 date palms planted in the commune. As of 2009 there were 9,575 sheep, 6,050 goats, 714 camels, and 23 cattle. There were also 6,400 chickens in 6 buildings.

There is no significant tourist industry in Erg Ferradj.

== Infrastructure and housing ==
Basic services in the town are generally well provided for. 100% of Erg Ferradj's population is connected to drinking water, 99% is connected to the sewerage system, and 99% (including 756 buildings) have access to electricity. There is no fuel service station in the town.

Erg Ferradj has a total of 1,300 houses, of which 712 are occupied, giving an occupation rate of 6.2 inhabitants per occupied building.

== Transportation ==
Erg Ferradj is reached by a local road from the N6 highway just west of Abadla. It is 12 kilometres (7.5 mi) from Abadla and 101 kilometres (63 mi) from Béchar.

There is a total length of 45 kilometres (28 mi) of roads in the commune.

== Education ==
There are 3 elementary schools, with 39 classrooms including 27 in use. There are a total of 1,096 school students.

2.8% of the population has a tertiary education, and another 14.9% has competed secondary education. The overall literacy rate is 71.3%, and is 77.2% among males and 65.3% among females.

== Health ==
Erg Ferradj has 2 polyclinics and 2 room care facilities; residents must travel to Abadla or Méchraâ Houari Boumédienne for further medical treatment.

== Religion ==
Erg Ferradj has 3 operational mosques, with another 1 under construction.

== Localities ==
The commune is composed of three localities:

- Erg Ferradj
- Guir Lotfi
- Hassi Menounat
