= Kénadsa District =

Kénadsa District دائرة القنادسة
- District
- Location of Kénadsa within Béchar Province
- Coordinates: 31°33′N 2°25′E
- Country: Algeria
- Province: Béchar
- District seat: Kénadsa

Area
  - Total: 5,040 km^{2} (1,950 sq mi)

Population (2008)
  - Total: 14,084
  - Density: 2.79/km^{2} (7.24/sq mi)
- Time zone: UTC+01 (CET)
- Municipalities: 2

Kénadsa is a district in Béchar Province, Algeria. It was named after its capital, Kénadsa. According to the 2008 census, the total population of the district was 14,084 inhabitants. The district covers the area directly west of the province's capital, Béchar; the Oued Guir flows from north to south through the district, and is dammed at the Djorf Torba dam.

== Municipalities ==
The district is further divided into 2 communes:

- Kénadsa
- Méridja
