= Kenadsa Longwave Transmitter =

Longwave transmitter of the Algerian Broadcasting Company

Coordinates: 31°34.1955′N 2°20.7001′W

Location of Kenadsa longwave transmitter in Algeria

The Kenadsa longwave transmitter is a longwave transmitter of the Algerian Broadcasting Company situated at Kénadsa near Béchar, which transmits the program of Chaine 1 with a power of 2000 kW on 153 kHz. Kenadsa longwave transmitter, among the most powerful broadcasting transmitters in the world, uses an antenna array of three 357-meter tall guyed masts, which are arranged in a line. In spite of its high power, and unlike the Tipaza Longwave Transmitter, Kenadsa broadcasts are difficult to receive in Europe. This occurs because its frequency is also used by powerful European broadcasting stations and as a result of signal attenuation caused by poor ground conductivity of the Sahara sand. It is currently the tallest structure in Algeria. The transmitter was off for more than 5 years, but low powered test broadcasts can be heard since 6th of december 2021, according local radio listeners. However, in mid 2022, this channel was back off air for unknown reasons. In 2023, a new station, "Ifrikiya FM", has been traced to be transmitting from this location.
