= Malika Mokeddem =

Algerian writer

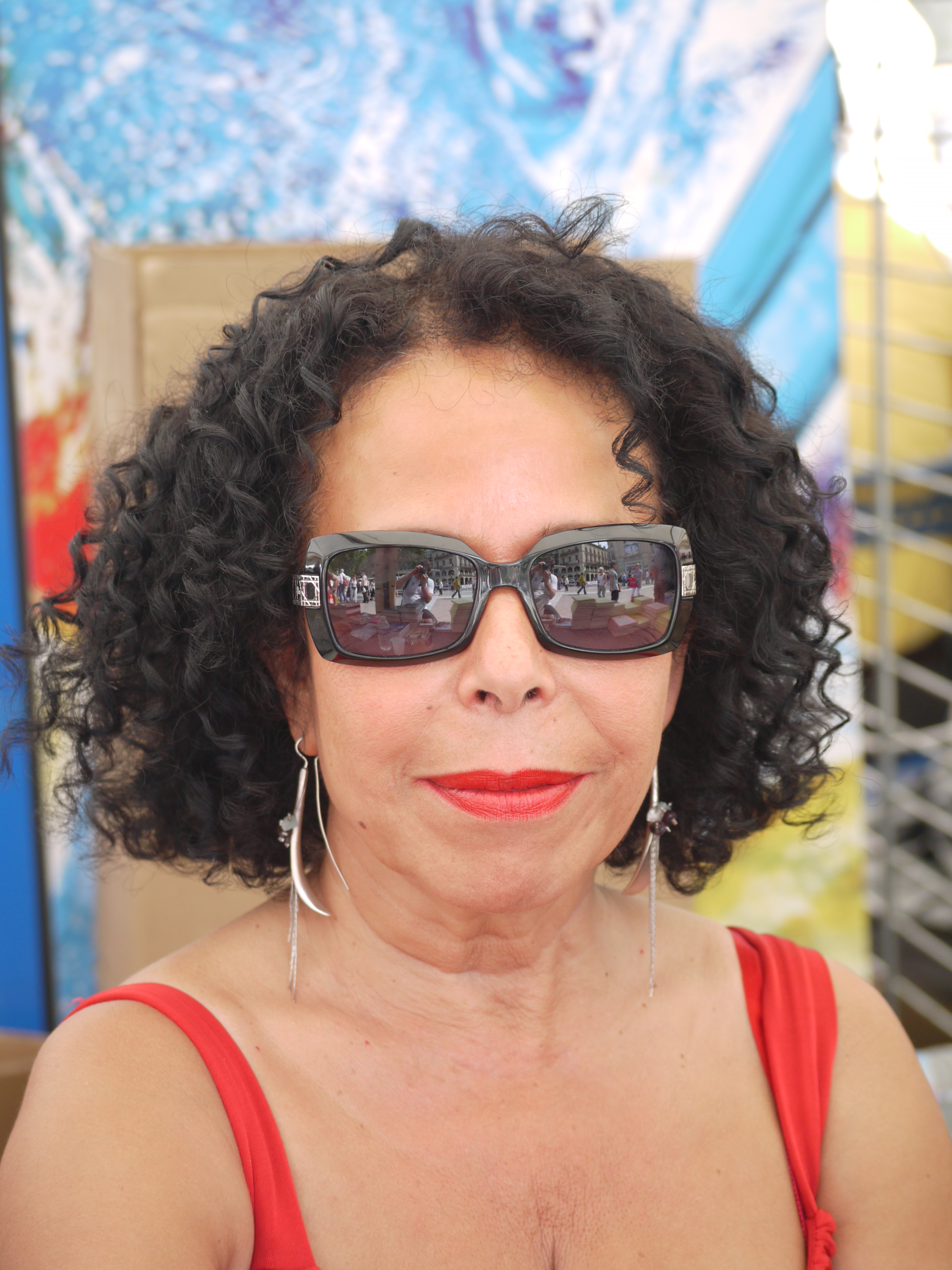
Malika Mokeddem in 2010

Malika Mokeddem (Kenadsa, Algeria; October 5, 1949) is an Algerian writer.

== Biography ==
Malika Mokeddem was born on October 5, 1949, in Kenadsa, a small mining town on the limit of the western desert of Algeria. She is the daughter of an illiterate nomad family who became sedentary. She grew up listening to the stories told by her grandmother, Zohra, and was the only girl in her family and town to finish secondary studies. She enrolled to study medicine in Oran and finished her studies in Paris. She specialized in Nephrology and later established in Montpellier in 1979. She practiced till 1985 when she decided to dedicate her time to literature.

== Works ==
- La Desirante (2011)
- The Men Who Walk (Les hommes qui marchent, 1990), Littré Prize and Fondation Nourredine Aba Prix.
- The Century of Locusts (Le siècle des sauterelles, 1992), Prix France-Maghreb Afrique-Méditerranée.
- The Forbidden Woman (L'interdite, 1994), Méditerranée Prix.
- Of Dreams and Assassins (Des rêves et des assassins, 1995)
- Night of the Lizard (La nuit de la lézarde, 1998)
- N'zid (2001)
- Trance of the Rebellious (La transe des insoumis, 2003)
- My Men (Mes hommes, 2005)
