= Abadla =

Abadla اﻟﻌﺒﺎدﻟﺔ
- Commune and town
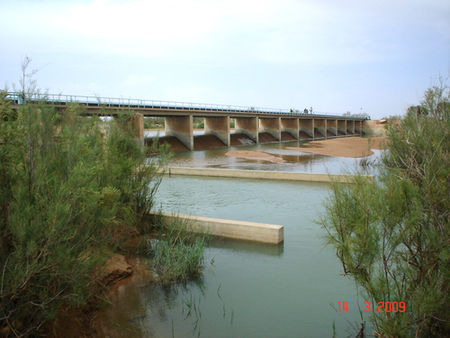
- Small dam near Abadla

- Location of Abadla commune within Béchar Province

- Location of Abadla within Algeria
- Coordinates: 31°1′N 2°44′W
- Country: Algeria
- Province: Béchar Province
- District: Abadla District

Area
  - Total: 2,870 km^{2} (1,110 sq mi)
- Elevation: 592 m (1,942 ft)

Population (2008)
  - Total: 13,636
  - Density: 4.75/km^{2} (12.3/sq mi)
- Time zone: UTC+1 (CET)
- Postal code: 08200

Abadla (Arabic: العبادلة) is a town and commune in western Algeria, and capital of Abadla District, Béchar Province. It is located on the Oued Guir southwest of Béchar. According to the 2008 census its population is 13,636, up from 10,845 in 1998, and an annual growth rate of 2.4%, making it the most populated commune in Béchar Province apart from the capital. The commune covers an area of 2,870 square kilometres (1,110 sq mi).

It is a major centre for the Arab Doui-Menia tribe.

== Geography ==
Abadla's location on the Oued Guir allows the growing of grain, facilitated in recent decades by the Djorf Torba dam located upstream. The area south of the town is mostly a flat plain, but there are several rocky hills found to the north of the town.

The Abbadla district is located on the banks of Wadi Qir, surrounded by the high Hamada Qir on more than two sides, from the northwest to the southwest. There are also northern highlands extending from the Saharan Atlas Mountains, the most important of which are the Shabakt Jahani highlands, the “Manounat” and “Hadb Shawahed” and “Qarat al-Lahm” highlands, “Shaib Rasou” along the southwestern side, “Qur al-Lamfird” “Quir al-Namus” and “Al-Thila” “Toumiyat”.

Dayet El Tayour is located in the middle of the distance between El Abadla and Taghit. It is a lake where the surface water of the valleys Boudib, Bechar, Safaya and Khamlia is stored. It is located between a chain of mountains, Ahbasa Mengar and Lemferd. In the fall and winter it floats under the seasonal rains, but it gradually dries up during the spring and summer. The creation of the artificial lake.

== Climate ==
Abadla has a hot desert climate (Köppen climate classification BWh), with extremely hot summers and cool winters, and very little precipitation throughout the year. The Abbadlah are hit by violent sandstorms from the southwest.They are frequent throughout the year, but especially in the spring,

Climate data for Abadla
Month	Jan	Feb	Mar	Apr	May	Jun	Jul	Aug	Sep	Oct	Nov	Dec	Year
Mean daily maximum °C (°F)	17.4 (63.3)	20.7 (69.3)	24.2 (75.6)	28.8 (83.8)	33.4 (92.1)	38.1 (100.6)	42.5 (108.5)	41.1 (106.0)	35.8 (96.4)	29.2 (84.6)	22 (72)	18.2 (64.8)	29.3 (84.8)
Daily mean °C (°F)	10.2 (50.4)	13.2 (55.8)	16.9 (62.4)	21.2 (70.2)	25.7 (78.3)	30.4 (86.7)	34.6 (94.3)	33.5 (92.3)	28.7 (83.7)	22.2 (72.0)	15.6 (60.1)	11.1 (52.0)	21.9 (71.5)
Mean daily minimum °C (°F)	3.1 (37.6)	5.8 (42.4)	9.6 (49.3)	13.7 (56.7)	18 (64)	22.8 (73.0)	26.7 (80.1)	26 (79)	21.6 (70.9)	15.2 (59.4)	9.2 (48.6)	4.3 (39.7)	14.7 (58.4)
Average precipitation mm (inches)	7 (0.3)	5 (0.2)	8 (0.3)	5 (0.2)	4 (0.2)	3 (0.1)	2 (0.1)	3 (0.1)	6 (0.2)	9 (0.4)	10 (0.4)	7 (0.3)	69 (2.8)
Source: climate-data.org

== Economy ==
Agriculture is the main industry in Abadla. The commune has a total of 350 hectares (860 acres) of arable land, of which 233 hectares (580 acres) is irrigated. There are a total of 23,350 date palms planted in the commune. As of 2009 there were 9,814 sheep, 2,777 goats, 1,939 camels, and 80 cattle. There were also 4000 chickens in 3 buildings.

== Infrastructure and housing ==
100% of Abadla's population is connected to drinking water, 99% is connected to the sewerage system, and 83% (including 2,527 buildings) have access to electricity. There is one fuel service station in the town.

Abadla has a total of 2,594 houses, of which 1,982 are occupied, giving an occupation rate of 6.9 inhabitants per occupied building.

== Transportation ==
Abadla is on the N6 national highway between Béchar to the northeast and Adrar to the southeast. The town of Méchraâ Houari Boumédienne is on the highway just to the south, while further to the south the towns of Igli, Béni Abbès and others can be accessed. The N50 highway leaves the N6 to the west just to the southwest of Abadla; it eventually leads to Tindouf, passing Hammaguir and Tinfouchy on the way.

The two other towns in Abadla District are Méchraâ Houari Boumédienne, which is 20 kilometres (12 mi) from Abadla, and Erg Ferradj, which is 12 kilometres (7.5 mi) from Abadla and is accessible by a local road on the northern side of the N6. Abadla is 91 kilometres (57 mi) from the provincial capital, Béchar.

There is a total length of 52 kilometres (32 mi) of roads in the commune.

Abadla was the terminus station of the Mediterranean-Niger-Railway.

== Education ==
There are 7 elementary schools, with 88 classrooms including 61 in use. There are a total of 3,190 school students.

5.9% of the population has a tertiary education, and another 21.3% has competed secondary education. The overall literacy rate is 83.4%, and is 90.0% among males and 76.5% among females.

== Health ==
Abadla has one polyclinic, 5 room care facilities, a maternity ward, 4 private pharmacies, and a medical operating theatre.

== Culture ==
Abadla has a cinema with 200 seats.

== Religion ==
Abadla has 4 operational mosques, with another 1 under construction.

== Localities ==
The commune is composed of two localities:

- Abadla
- Ksi Ksou
