= Oued Saoura =

River in Béchar Province, Algeria

Coordinates: 30°29′11″N 2°18′18″W

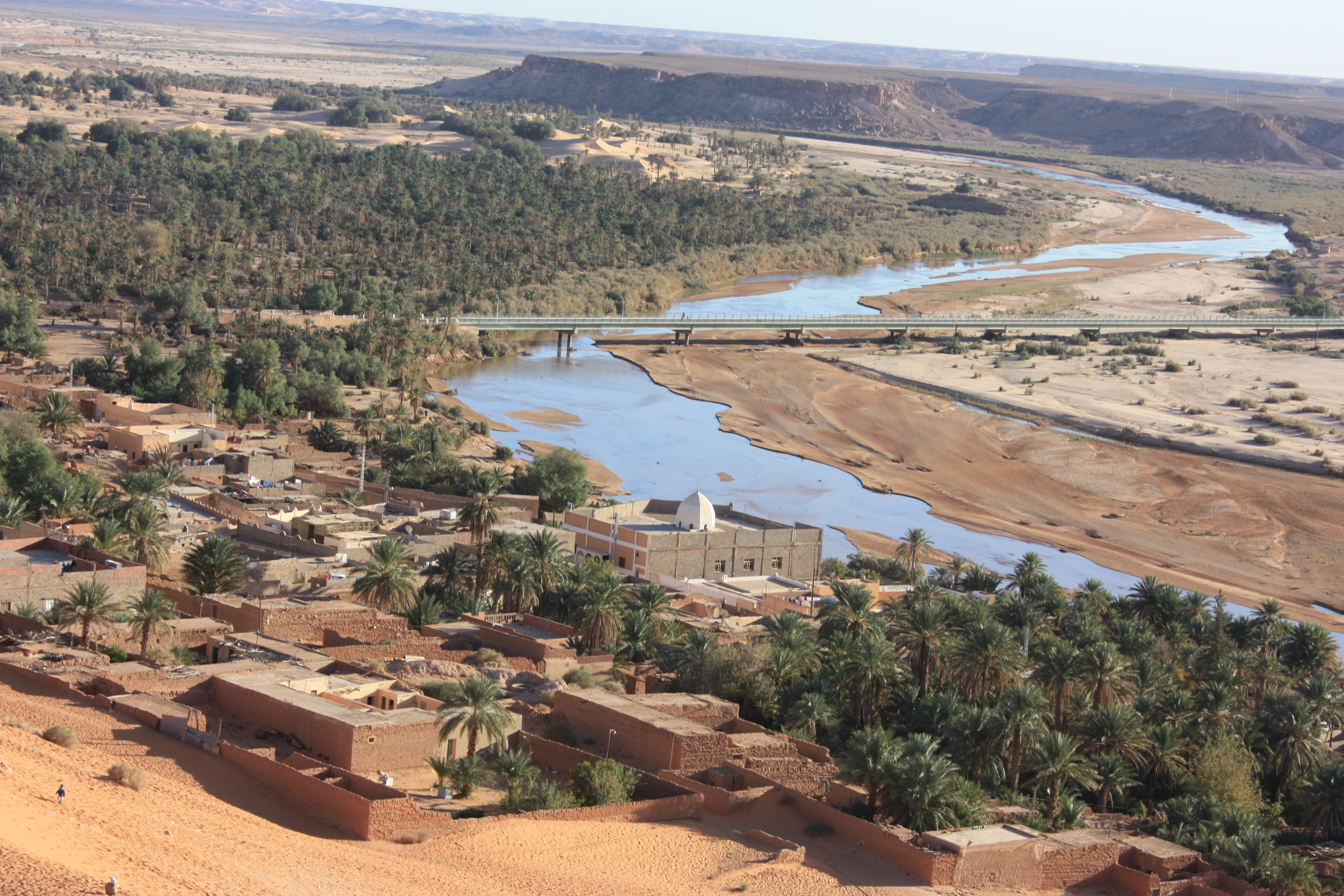
- The Oued Saoura at Béni Abbès

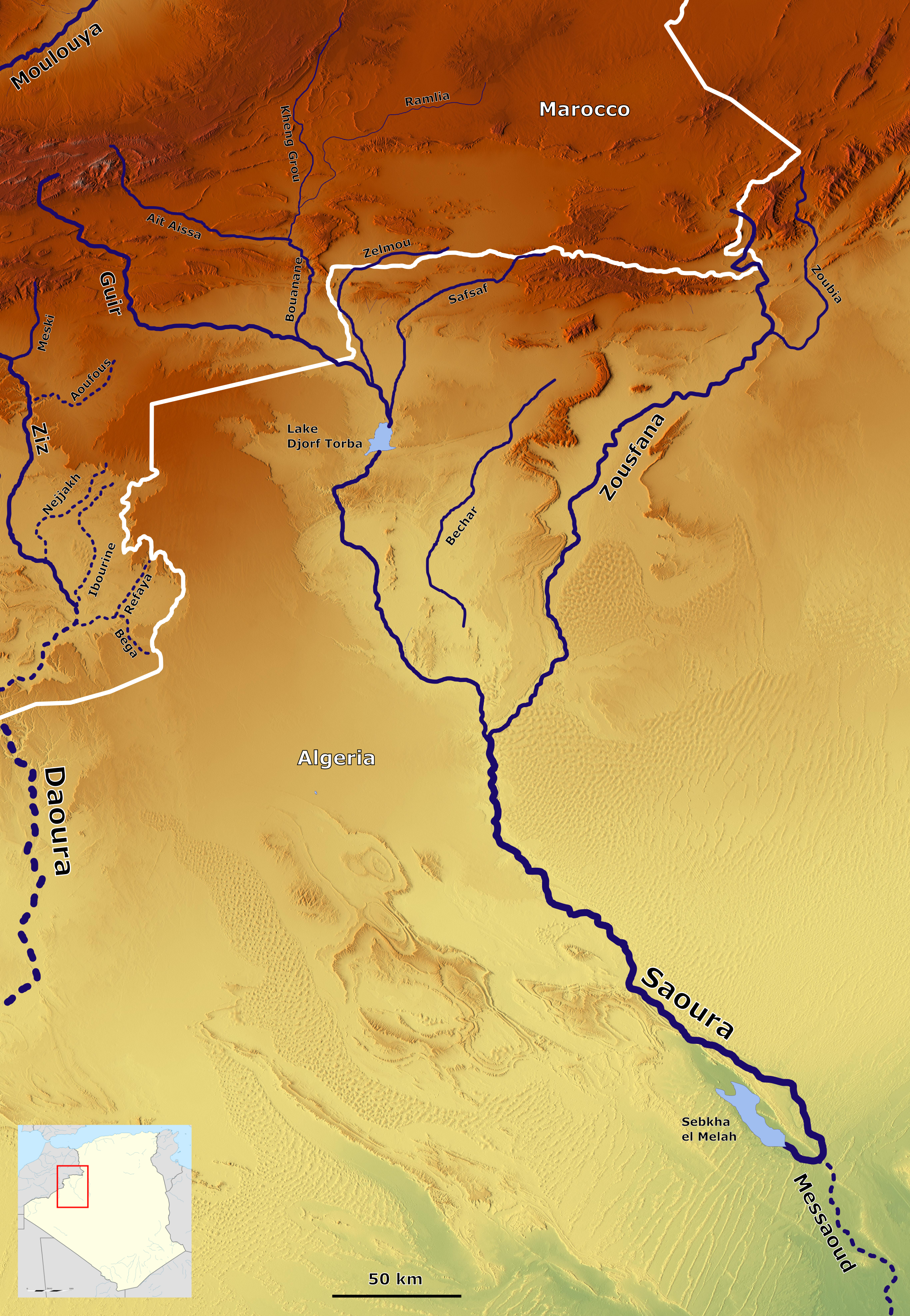
- The river system of the Saoura

Location
- Country: Algeria
- Region: Béchar Province (with a small section in Adrar Province)

Physical characteristics
- Source
  - location: Confluence of Oued Guir and Oued Zouzfana
- Mouth
  - location: Sebkhel el Melah
  - elevation: 300 m (980 ft)

Basin features
- Tributaries
  - left: Oued Zouzfana
  - right: Oued Guir

Oued Saoura is an intermittent river, or wadi, formed from the confluence of the Oued Guir and Oued Zouzfana at Igli, forming the Saoura valley. While in the past the flow of the river was steady and plentiful, in recent years it has diminished due to the construction of the Djorf Torba Dam on the Oued Guir.

== Course ==
From Igli the Oued Saoura runs through Béchar Province past the towns of Béni Abbès, Tamtert, El Ouata, Béni Ikhlef, Kerzaz, Timoudi, Ouled Khoudir, and Ksabi, then passes under the N6 highway before reaching the endorheic lake Sebkha el Melah.
