= Béni Ounif =

Beni Ounif ﺑﻨﻰ و ﻧﻴﻒ ⴰⵢⵜ ⵓⵏⵏⵉⴼ
- Commune and town
- Location of Béni Ounif commune within Béchar Province

- Location of Béni Ounif within Algeria
- Coordinates: 32.05°N 1.25°W
- Country: Algeria
- Province: Béchar Province
- District: Béni Ounif District

Area
  - Total: 16,600 km^{2} (6,400 sq mi)
- Elevation: 829 m (2,720 ft)

Population (2008)
  - Total: 11,209
  - Density: 0.675/km^{2} (1.75/sq mi)
- Time zone: UTC+1 (CET)
- CP: 08100

Béni Ounif is a town and commune in Béchar Province, Algeria, coextensive with the district of Béni Ounif. It has a population of 10,732 as of the 2008 census, up from 8,199 in 1998, and had an annual growth rate of 2.8%, the second highest in the province. The commune covers an area of 16,600 square kilometres (6,400 sq mi).

== History ==
The Béni Ounif massacre took place in the commune near the Moroccan border, on 15 August 1999. Guerrillas stopped a bus at a fake roadblock and killed some 29 people. President Abdelaziz Bouteflika suggested that the terrorists in question had found shelter in Morocco, but later retracted the accusation. The Moroccan Interior Minister Driss Basri denied the allegations.

== Geography ==
Béni Ounif lies at an elevation of 829 metres (2,720 ft) on the Oued Zouzfana downstream of Figuig. To the south the landscape is mostly flat, with a few small hills, while to the north there is a range of taller, rocky hills running from west to east along the Algeria–Morocco border. Aside from the river valleys which support vegetation and agriculture, the low rainfall in the area results in an arid, barren landscape.

== Climate ==
Béni Ounif has a hot desert climate, with very hot summers and cool winters, and light precipitation throughout the year, especially in summer, although a little more rain does fall than in other towns in Béchar Province.

Climate data for Béni Ounif
Month	Jan	Feb	Mar	Apr	May	Jun	Jul	Aug	Sep	Oct	Nov	Dec	Year
Mean daily maximum °C (°F)	15.1 (59.2)	18.5 (65.3)	20.8 (69.4)	26.1 (79.0)	30.7 (87.3)	35.7 (96.3)	39.7 (103.5)	38.2 (100.8)	32.9 (91.2)	25.5 (77.9)	21 (70)	15.7 (60.3)	26.7 (80.0)
Daily mean °C (°F)	9.1 (48.4)	11.4 (52.5)	14 (57)	18.5 (65.3)	23.5 (74.3)	28.2 (82.8)	31.8 (89.2)	30.9 (87.6)	25.6 (78.1)	19.5 (67.1)	14.4 (57.9)	9.4 (48.9)	19.7 (67.4)
Mean daily minimum °C (°F)	3.1 (37.6)	4.3 (39.7)	7.3 (45.1)	11.0 (51.8)	16.4 (61.5)	20.7 (69.3)	24.0 (75.2)	23.6 (74.5)	18.3 (64.9)	13.6 (56.5)	7.8 (46.0)	3.2 (37.8)	12.8 (55.0)
Average precipitation mm (inches)	12 (0.5)	9 (0.4)	17 (0.7)	12 (0.5)	7 (0.3)	4 (0.2)	1 (0.0)	6 (0.2)	12 (0.5)	20 (0.8)	16 (0.6)	15 (0.6)	131 (5.3)
Source: climate-data.org

== Economy ==
Agriculture is the main industry in Béni Ounif. The commune has a total of 2,030 hectares (5,000 acres) of arable land, of which 820 hectares (2,000 acres) is irrigated. There are a total of 71,800 date palms planted in the commune. As of 2009 there were 23,210 sheep, 16,664 goats, 1,766 camels, and 444 cattle.

Tourism is a part of Béni Ounif's economy; there is one hotel in the town. Tourist attractions include palm groves, the old ksar and an ancient fort.

== Infrastructure and housing ==
75% of Béni Ounif's population is connected to drinking water (the lowest rate in the province), 96% is connected to the sewerage system, and 87% (including 2,412 buildings) have access to electricity. There is one fuel service station in the town.

Béni Ounif has a total of 2,576 houses, of which 1,754 are occupied, giving an occupation rate of 6.1 inhabitants per occupied building.

== Transportation ==
Béni Ounif is on the N6 highway between Mecheria to the northwest and Béchar to the southwest. While a road leads from the western side of the city to the Moroccan town of Figuig, the border has been closed since 1994. Béni Ounif is 110 kilometres (68 mi) from the provincial capital, Béchar. There is a total length of 263 kilometres (163 mi) of roads in the commune.

Béni Ounif has a station on the Méchéria-Béchar railway line operated by the National Company for Rail Transport.

== Education ==
There are 10 elementary schools, with 70 classrooms including 47 in use. There are a total of 2,262 school students.

5.8% of the population has a tertiary education, and another 20.3% has competed secondary education. The overall literacy rate is 79.3%, and is 86.0% among males and 72.7% among females.

== Health ==
Béni Ounif has one polyclinic, 8-room care facilities, a maternity ward, and 2 private pharmacies.

== Culture ==
Béni Ounif has a cinema with 315 seats.

== Religion ==
Béni Ounif has 6 operational mosques, with another 3 under construction. Islam plays a central role in the cultural and religious practices of the people in Béni Ounif. Islamic traditions, such as prayer, fasting during Ramadan, and celebrations of Islamic holidays like Eid al-Fitr and Eid al-Adha, are important aspects of community life.

== Tribes ==
The Berber people are indigenous to North Africa and have a long history in the region. In Algeria, Berbers make up a significant portion of the population, and they have preserved their distinct cultural practices, languages, and traditions. Berber Languages, such as Tarifit, are spoken by many Berbers in Béni Ounif. Arab-Berbers are individuals who have mixed Arab and Berber ancestry. They represent a significant portion of the population in Algeria, including Béni Ounif. Arab-Berbers have cultural characteristics that combine elements from both Arab and Berber traditions. While Berbers and Arab are the predominant ethnic groups in Béni Ounif, it's worth noting that there may be smaller populations of other ethnic groups present in the region as well. This could include groups like Tuaregs or Sahrawis, who have historical ties to the broader Sahara region.

== Localities ==
The commune is composed of 11 localities:

- Beni Ounif (Centre)
- Jenan Dar
- Fendi
- Rosta Taïba
- Zoubia
- Oued Namous
- Saf Saf
- Laouedj
- Douis
- Bouaiache
- Hador

The locality Zoubia is a village, located on the N6 highway about 25 kilometres (16 mi) to the northeast, on the border with Naâma Province.

Neighbouring towns and cities

== See also ==
- List of Algerian massacres of the 1990s
