= Mogheul =

Mogheul ﻣﻮﻏﻞ
- Commune and town
- Location of Mogheul commune within Béchar Province

- Location of Mogheul within Algeria
- Coordinates: 32°1′21″N 2°13′5″W
- Country: Algeria
- Province: Béchar Province
- District: Lahmar District

Area
  - Total: 640 km^{2} (250 sq mi)
- Elevation: 1,026 m (3,366 ft)

Population (2008)
  - Total: 635
  - Density: 0.99/km^{2} (2.6/sq mi)
- Time zone: UTC+1 (CET)

Mogheul (Arabic: ﻣﻮﻏﻞ) is a town and commune in Lahmar District, Béchar Province, in western Algeria near the border with Morocco. According to the 2008 census its population is 635, down from 682 in 1998, with an annual growth rate of -0.7%, the lowest in the province. The commune covers an area of 640 square kilometres (250 sq mi), making it the smallest by area in the province.

== Geography ==
Mogheul lies at an elevation of 1,026 metres (3,366 ft) on a plateau crossed by ranges of rocky hills. Small ranges rising about 100 metres (330 ft) above the surrounds are found quite nearby the town to the north and south; higher ranges are found further to the northeast and further south.

== Climate ==
Mogheul has a hot desert climate (Köppen climate classification BWh), with very hot summers and cool winters. Precipitation is generally light, although due to Mogheul's high altitude and latitude it does receive somewhat more rain than other locations in Béchar Province. Summers are particularly dry.

Climate data for Mogheul
Month	Jan	Feb	Mar	Apr	May	Jun	Jul	Aug	Sep	Oct	Nov	Dec	Year
Mean daily maximum °C (°F)	14.5 (58.1)	17.5 (63.5)	20.3 (68.5)	24.7 (76.5)	30.4 (86.7)	33.9 (93.0)	38.7 (101.7)	37.7 (99.9)	32.4 (90.3)	25.6 (78.1)	19.1 (66.4)	14.9 (58.8)	25.8 (78.5)
Daily mean °C (°F)	8.0 (46.4)	10.4 (50.7)	13.4 (56.1)	17.4 (63.3)	23.2 (73.8)	26.6 (79.9)	30.9 (87.6)	30.3 (86.5)	25.3 (77.5)	19.1 (66.4)	12.8 (55.0)	8.4 (47.1)	18.8 (65.9)
Mean daily minimum °C (°F)	1.5 (34.7)	3.4 (38.1)	6.6 (43.9)	10.1 (50.2)	16.0 (60.8)	19.3 (66.7)	23.1 (73.6)	22.9 (73.2)	18.2 (64.8)	12.6 (54.7)	6.6 (43.9)	1.9 (35.4)	11.9 (53.3)
Average precipitation mm (inches)	14 (0.6)	13 (0.5)	16 (0.6)	14 (0.6)	9 (0.4)	5 (0.2)	2 (0.1)	5 (0.2)	12 (0.5)	18 (0.7)	20 (0.8)	19 (0.7)	147 (5.9)
Source: climate-data.org

== Economy ==
Agriculture is a significant industry in Mogheul. The commune has a total of 1,200 hectares (3,000 acres) of arable land, of which only 105 hectares (260 acres) is irrigated. There are a total of 22,200 date palms planted in the commune. As of 2009 there were 745 sheep, 555 goats, and 2 cattle.

== Infrastructure and housing ==
100% of Mogheul's population is connected to drinking water, 100% is connected to the sewerage system, and 89% (including 179 buildings) have access to electricity. There are no fuel service stations in the town; the nearest is in Béchar.

Mogheul has a total of 257 houses, of which 114 are occupied, giving an occupation rate of 5.6 inhabitants per occupied building, the second lowest in the province (after Lahmar).

== Transportation ==
A local road connects the town to Lahmar, 13 kilometres (8.1 mi) to the south, and then continues south to the provincial capital Béchar, 43 kilometres (27 mi) from Mogheul.

There is a total length of 39.4 kilometres (24.5 mi) of roads in the commune.

== Education ==
There is one elementary school, with 6 classrooms including 4 in use. There are a total of 44 school students; secondary students study in Lahmar.

6.1% of the population has a tertiary education, and another 23.7% has competed secondary education. The overall literacy rate is 84.9%, and is 89.9% among males and 80.0% among females.

== Health ==
Mogheul has a polyclinic, and a room care facility. The nearest hospital is in Béchar.

== Religion ==
Mogheul has one operational mosque, with another one under construction.

== Localities ==
The commune is composed of two localities:

- Mogheul
- El Menabha

El Menabha is about 5 kilometres (3.1 mi) west of Mogheul town, on the road to Lahmar.
