= Mazzer =

- Village
- Location within Algeria
- Coordinates: 30°19′44″N 2°17′30″W
- Country: Algeria
- Province: Béni Abbès Province
- District: Igli District
- Commune: Igli
- Elevation: 487 m (1,598 ft)
- Time zone: UTC+1 (CET)

Mazzer is a village in the commune of Igli, Algeria, in Béni Abbès Province, Algeria. The village lies on the Oued Saoura south of Igli and north of Béni Abbès.
