= Doui-Menia =

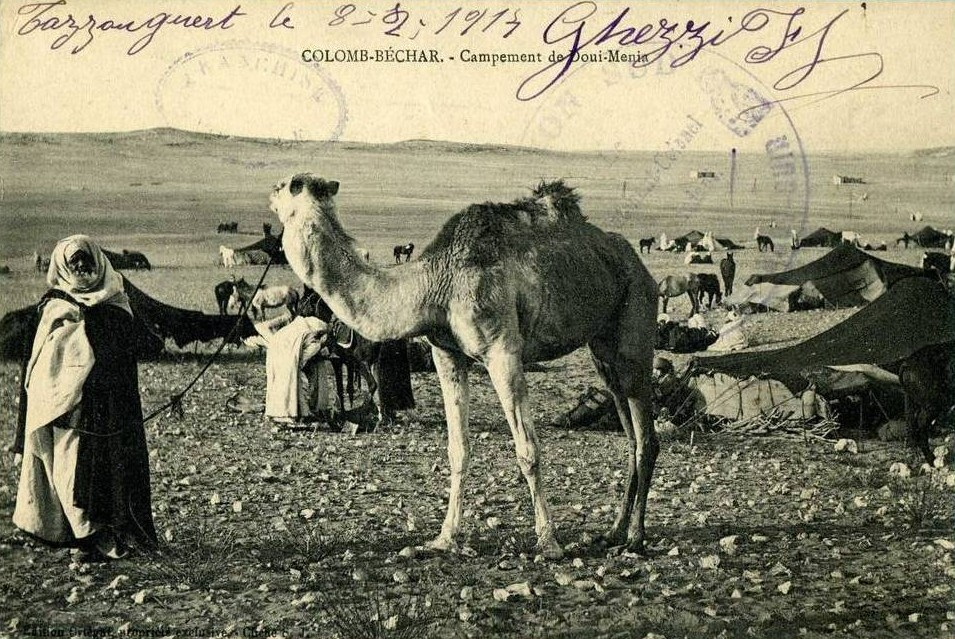
A camp of the Doui-Menia

The Doui-Menia or Dawi-Mani` (Arabic ذوي منيع, Maghrebi Arabic /dwi-mniʕ/) are an Arab tribe of the Moroccan-Algerian border between Taghit and the Tafilalt region, centered on Abadla in the Guir valley. They became prominent in the area with their expansion eastwards around the 17th century, notably at the expense of the Ghenanma and Hamyan. A fraction of the Doui-Menia live on the outskirts of Fez in the area of Jebel Zerhoun and historically were a Makhzen tribe organised into a permanent guich. Like several other tribes of the region, they are divided into "five fifths" (khams khmas), tracing their descent to a common ancestor, `Addi el-Meni`i; according to Dunn (1977:70), these are:

- Ouled Djelloul.
- Ouled Youssef.
- Idersa.
- Ouled Bou Anane.
- Ouled bel Giz.

To these a "sixth" was added by alliance in the 19th century: the neighbouring Ouled Djerir near Bechar. Traditionally mainly nomadic, agriculture became an essential part of their economy in the eighteenth century: each "fifth" cultivated a portion of the seasonally flooded lands along the Guir valley near Abadla, and stored the produce in fortified silos (matmuras). They also bought, or confiscated, palm groves at nearby oases. By the end of the nineteenth century their expansion had largely ceased, perhaps since the need of collective manpower for harvesting limited their mobility. They were, however, substantially involved in resistance against the French conquest of the region.
