= Boukaïs =

Boukaïs بوقايس
- Commune and town
- Location of Boukaïs commune within Béchar Province

- Location of Boukaïs within Algeria
- Coordinates: 31°55′24″N 2°27′49″W
- Country: Algeria
- Province: Béchar Province
- District: Lahmar District

Area
  - Total: 1,760 km^{2} (680 sq mi)
- Elevation: 851 m (2,792 ft)

Population (2008)
  - Total: 970
  - Density: 0.55/km^{2} (1.4/sq mi)
- Time zone: UTC+1 (CET)

Boukaïs (Arabic: بوقايس) is a town and commune in Lahmar District, Béchar Province, in western Algeria. According to the 2008 census its population is 970, up from 890 in 1998, and its annual population growth rate is 0.9%. The commune covers an area of 1,760 square kilometres (680 sq mi).

== Geography ==
Boukaïs lies at an elevation of 851 metres (2,792 ft) on a rocky plain at the edge of a region of higher, darkly colored rocky hills. There is an even higher range of lightly colored hills to the west. The Oued Ihrassa passes by the town to the east; water from this river is used to irrigate the palm grove found to the southwest of the town.

== Climate ==
Boukaïs has a hot desert climate, with very hot summers and cool winters, and low precipitation throughout the year, especially in summer.

Climate data for Boukaïs
Month	Jan	Feb	Mar	Apr	May	Jun	Jul	Aug	Sep	Oct	Nov	Dec	Year
Mean daily maximum °C (°F)	15.3 (59.5)	18.4 (65.1)	21.4 (70.5)	25.8 (78.4)	30.8 (87.4)	34.6 (94.3)	39.3 (102.7)	38.3 (100.9)	33.2 (91.8)	26.6 (79.9)	19.7 (67.5)	15.4 (59.7)	26.6 (79.8)
Daily mean °C (°F)	8.6 (47.5)	11.3 (52.3)	14.5 (58.1)	18.6 (65.5)	23.6 (74.5)	27.4 (81.3)	31.6 (88.9)	31 (88)	26.2 (79.2)	20.0 (68.0)	13.5 (56.3)	9.2 (48.6)	19.6 (67.4)
Mean daily minimum °C (°F)	2.0 (35.6)	4.3 (39.7)	7.7 (45.9)	11.4 (52.5)	16.4 (61.5)	20.3 (68.5)	24.0 (75.2)	23.8 (74.8)	19.3 (66.7)	13.5 (56.3)	7.4 (45.3)	2.6 (36.7)	12.7 (54.9)
Average precipitation mm (inches)	13 (0.5)	12 (0.5)	13 (0.5)	12 (0.5)	8 (0.3)	4 (0.2)	2 (0.1)	4 (0.2)	10 (0.4)	16 (0.6)	17 (0.7)	16 (0.6)	127 (5.1)
Source: climate-data.org

== Economy ==
Agriculture is a significant industry in Boukaïs. The commune has a total of 300 hectares (740 acres) of arable land, of which 110 hectares (270 acres) is irrigated. There are a total of 19,000 date palms planted in the commune. As of 2009 there were 1,613 sheep, 1,815 goats, 613 camels, and 8 cattle.

== Infrastructure and housing ==
100% of Boukaïs's population is connected to drinking water, 99% is connected to the sewerage system, and 91% (including 210 buildings) have access to electricity. There is no fuel service stations in the town.

Boukaïs has a total of 239 houses, of which 163 are occupied, giving an occupation rate of 6.0 inhabitants per occupied building.

== Transportation ==
A local road connects the town to Lahmar, 30 kilometres (19 mi) to the east, and then continues south to the provincial capital Béchar, 50 kilometres (31 mi) from Boukaïs.

There is a total length of 11.3 kilometres (7.0 mi) of roads in the commune.

== Education ==
There is one elementary school, with 8 classrooms including 5 in use. There are a total of 97 elementary and middle school students; secondary school students attend education in Lahmar.

6.0% of the population has a tertiary education, and another 20.6% has competed secondary education. The overall literacy rate is 79.7%, and is 86.7% among males and 73.2% among females.

== Health ==
Boukaïs only has one room care facility; for medical treatment residents must travel to a clinic in Lahmar or the hospital in Béchar.

== Religion ==
Boukaïs has one operational mosque, with another one under construction.

== Localities ==
The commune is composed of just one locality – the town of Boukaïs itself.
