= Gourrama =

Gourrama كرامة
- Town
- Location within Morocco
- Coordinates: 32°20′N 4°05′W
- Country: Morocco
- Region: Drâa-Tafilalet
- Province: Midelt

Population (2014)
  - Total: 14,920
- Time zone: UTC+0 (GMT)

Gourrama (Arabic: كرامة) is a town in Midelt Province, Drâa-Tafilalet, Morocco. According to the 2014 census it has a population of 14,920.
