= Djorf Torba Dam =

Dam in Béchar, Algeria

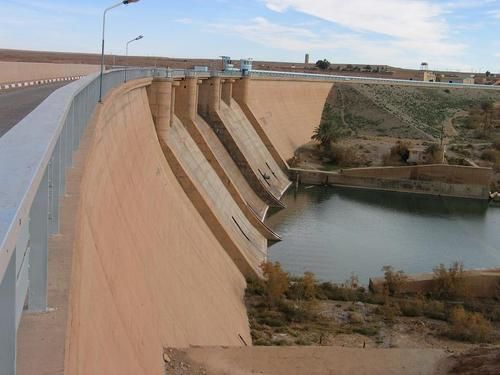

- Location within Algeria
- Official name: Barrage Djorf-Torba
- Country: Algeria
- Location: Kenadsa District, Béchar Province
- Coordinates: 31°30′38″N 2°46′16″W
- Purpose: Water supply
- Status: Operational
- Opening date: 1968

Dam and spillways
- Impounds: Oued Guir
- Height: 38 m (125 ft)
- Dam volume: 1,900,000 m^{3} (2,485,106 cu yd) (as of 2006)

Reservoir
- Total capacity: 350,000,000 m^{3} (457,782,717 cu yd)
- Active capacity: 190,000,000 m^{3} (248,510,618 cu yd) (as of 2006)

Djorf Torba Dam is a dam in Kenadsa District, Béchar Province, Algeria, crossing the Oued Guir about 50 kilometres (31 mi) west of the capital, Béchar. It is used for the purposes of irrigation and water supply. The area around the head of the dam features a number of notable ancient monuments. The dam has resulted in a significant reduction in the flow of Oued Guir and Oued Saoura in locations downstream of the dam.

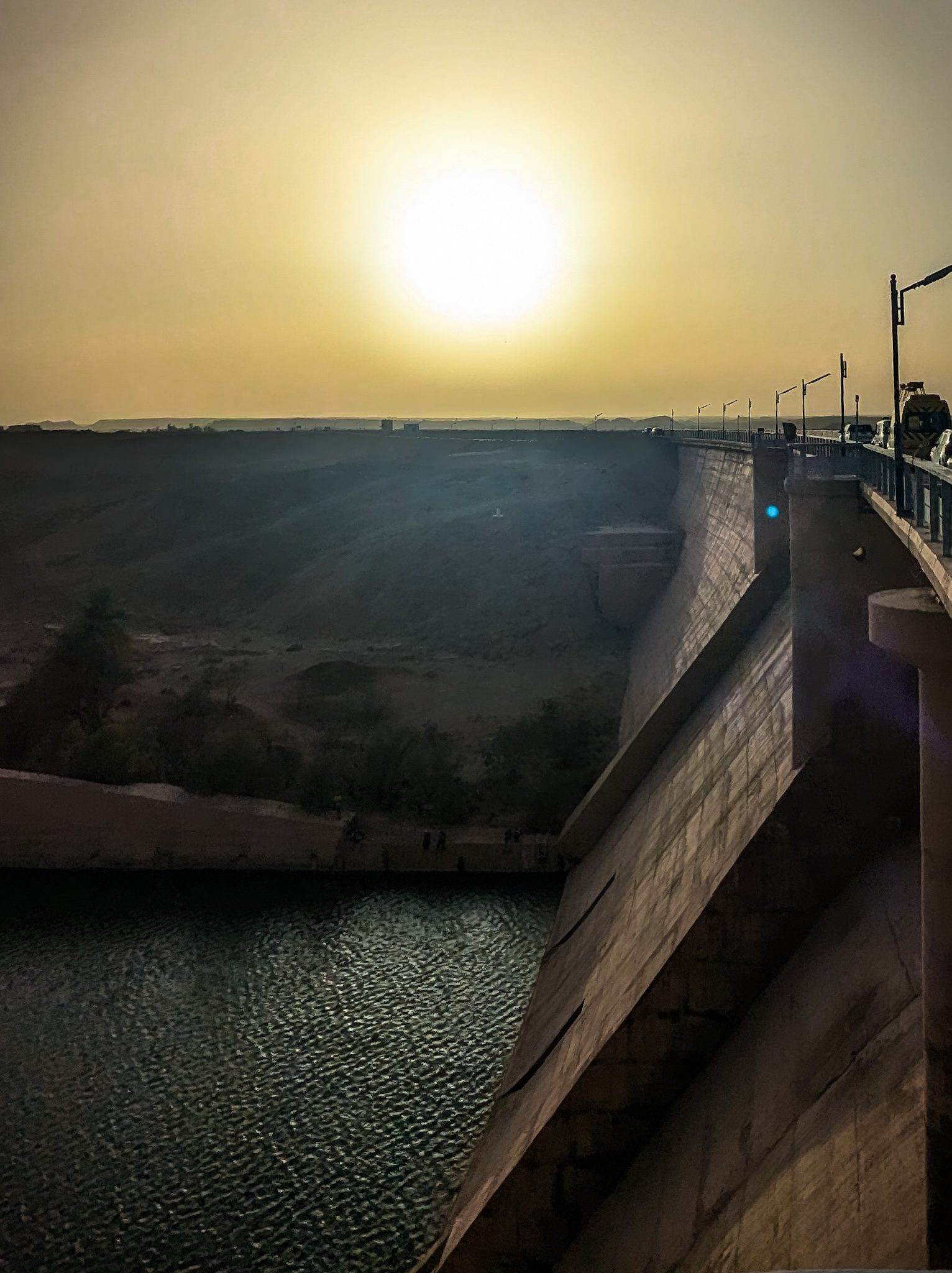
Djorfa troba
