= Ouled Djerir =

The Ouled Djerir (Arabic: أولاد جرير) are a small Arab tribe of the Bechar area in southwestern Algeria. Their close alliance with the neighboring Doui-Menia has led them to be counted as the "sixth fifth" of that tribe.

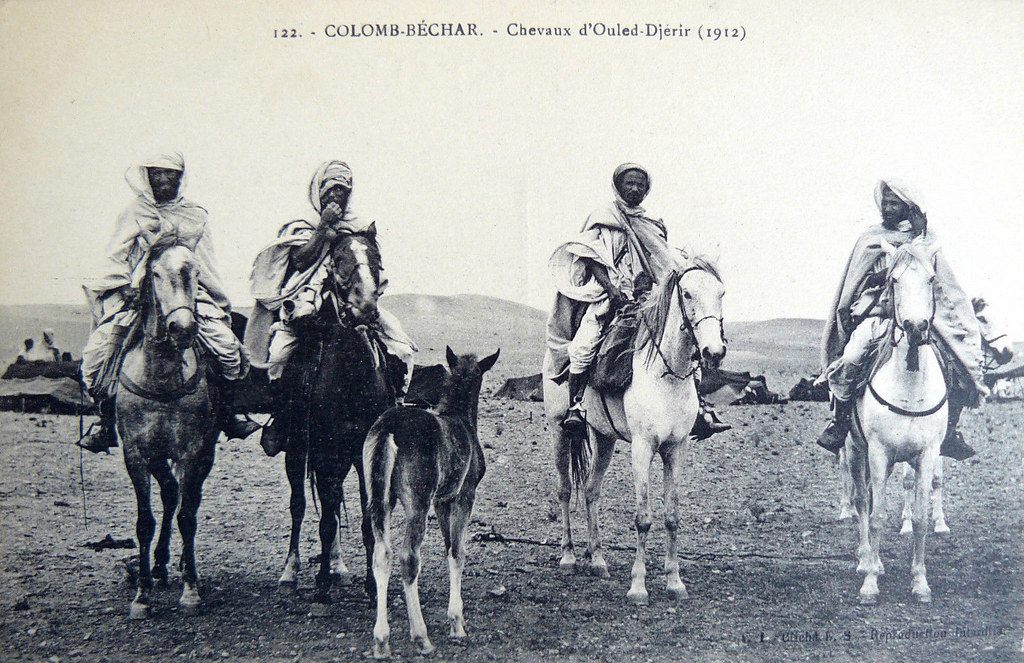
Horsemens of Ouled Djerir

Their economy was traditionally based on camel-herding along with a little agriculture.
