= Béni Ounif District =

Béni Ounif District دائرة بني ونيف
- District
- Map of Algeria highlighting Béchar Province

- Map of Béchar Province highlighting Béni Ounif District
- Coordinates: 32°03′00″N 01°15′00″E
- Country: Algeria
- Province: Béchar
- District seat: Béni Ounif
- Time zone: UTC+01 (CET)
- Municipalities: 2

Béni Ounif District is a district in Béchar Province, Algeria.
