= Lahmar District =

Lahmar District دائرة لحمر
- District
- Location of Lahmar within Béchar Province
- Coordinates: 31°56′N 2°16′E
- Country: Algeria
- Province: Béchar
- District seat: Lahmar

Area
  - Total: 3,220 km^{2} (1,240 sq mi)

Population (2008)
  - Total: 3,574
  - Density: 1.11/km^{2} (2.87/sq mi)
- Time zone: UTC+01 (CET)
- Municipalities: 3

Lahmar is a district in Béchar Province, Algeria. It was named after its capital, Lahmar. According to the 2008 census, the total population of the district was 3,574 inhabitants. The region lies to the north of the provincial capital Béchar and is connected to it by a local road.

== Municipalities ==
The district is further divided into 3 communes, all of them being among the 20 least populous communes in Algeria:

- Lahmar
- Mogheul
- Boukaïs
