= Lahmar =

Lahmar اﻻﺣﻤﺮ
- Commune and town
- Location of Lahmar commune within Béchar Province

- Location of Lahmar within Algeria
- Coordinates: 31°55′53″N 2°15′30″W
- Country: Algeria
- Province: Béchar Province
- District: Lahmar District

Area
  - Total: 820 km^{2} (320 sq mi)
- Elevation: 939 m (3,081 ft)

Population (2008)
  - Total: 1,961
  - Density: 2.4/km^{2} (6.2/sq mi)
- Time zone: UTC+1 (CET)

Lahmar (Arabic: اﻻﺣﻤﺮ) is a town and commune, and capital of Lahmar District, in Béchar Province, western Algeria. According to the 2008 census its population is 1,969, up from 1,404 in 1998, and its population growth rate is 3.5%, the highest in the province. The commune covers an area of 820 square kilometres (320 sq mi).

== Geography ==
Lahmar lies at an altitude of 939 metres (3,081 ft) on a rocky plain with scattered higher mountains to the east. One prominent range of hills is just to the east, and separates Lahmar from the nearby locality of Sfissifa.

== Climate ==
Lahmar has a hot desert climate, with very hot summers and cool winters, and very little precipitation throughout the year. Winter nights can be quite chilly due to Lahmar's altitude.

Climate data for Lahmar
Month	Jan	Feb	Mar	Apr	May	Jun	Jul	Aug	Sep	Oct	Nov	Dec	Year
Mean daily maximum °C (°F)	14.9 (58.8)	18.1 (64.6)	21 (70)	25.4 (77.7)	30.6 (87.1)	34.4 (93.9)	39.1 (102.4)	38.1 (100.6)	33.0 (91.4)	26.2 (79.2)	19.5 (67.1)	15.5 (59.9)	26.3 (79.4)
Daily mean °C (°F)	8.3 (46.9)	11.0 (51.8)	14.1 (57.4)	18.1 (64.6)	23.4 (74.1)	27.2 (81.0)	31.4 (88.5)	30.8 (87.4)	26.0 (78.8)	19.7 (67.5)	13.3 (55.9)	8.9 (48.0)	19.4 (66.8)
Mean daily minimum °C (°F)	1.7 (35.1)	3.9 (39.0)	7.3 (45.1)	10.9 (51.6)	16.2 (61.2)	20.0 (68.0)	23.8 (74.8)	23.6 (74.5)	19.0 (66.2)	13.2 (55.8)	7.1 (44.8)	2.3 (36.1)	12.4 (54.4)
Average precipitation mm (inches)	12 (0.5)	11 (0.4)	14 (0.6)	12 (0.5)	8 (0.3)	4 (0.2)	1 (0.0)	4 (0.2)	10 (0.4)	17 (0.7)	18 (0.7)	16 (0.6)	127 (5.1)
Source: climate-data.org

== Economy ==
Agriculture is the main industry in Lahmar. The commune has a total of 2,371 hectares (5,860 acres) of arable land, of which 930 hectares (2,300 acres) is irrigated. There are a total of 57,000 date palms planted in the commune. As of 2009 there were 8,430 sheep, 2,003 goats, and 80 cattle, the highest number of cattle for any commune in the province. There were also 106,800 chickens in 3 buildings, and 165 bee hives.

== Infrastructure and housing ==
100% of Lahmar's population is connected to drinking water, 100% are connected to the sewerage system, and 99% (including 562 buildings) have access to electricity. There are no fuel service stations in the town; the nearest is in Béchar.

Lahmar has a total of 607 houses, of which 361 are occupied, giving an occupation rate of 5.5 inhabitants per occupied building. This is the lowest such rate in Béchar Province.

== Transportation ==
A local road leads to the provincial capital of Béchar, 30 kilometres (19 mi) to the south. Other tracks lead 25 kilometres (16 mi) north to the town of Mogheul, and 13 kilometres (8.1 mi) west to the town of Boukaïs.

There is a total length of 39.4 kilometres (24.5 mi) of roads in the commune.

== Education ==
There are 2 elementary schools, with 11 classrooms including 9 in use. There are a total of 539 school students.

3.3% of the population has a tertiary education, and another 16.3% has competed secondary education. The overall literacy rate is 88.1%, and is 92.7% among males and 83.2% among females - all the highest in the province.

== Health ==
Lahmar has a polyclinic, a room care facility and a maternity ward. The nearest hospital is in Béchar.

== Religion ==
Lahmar has 3 operational mosques, with another 1 under construction.

== Localities ==
Lahmar consists of two localities:

- Lahmar
- Sfissifa

Sfissifa is 3 kilometres (1.9 mi) east of Lahmar.
