= Figuig =

Place in Eastern Morocco

Figuig فجيج ⵉⴼⵢⵢⴻⵢ
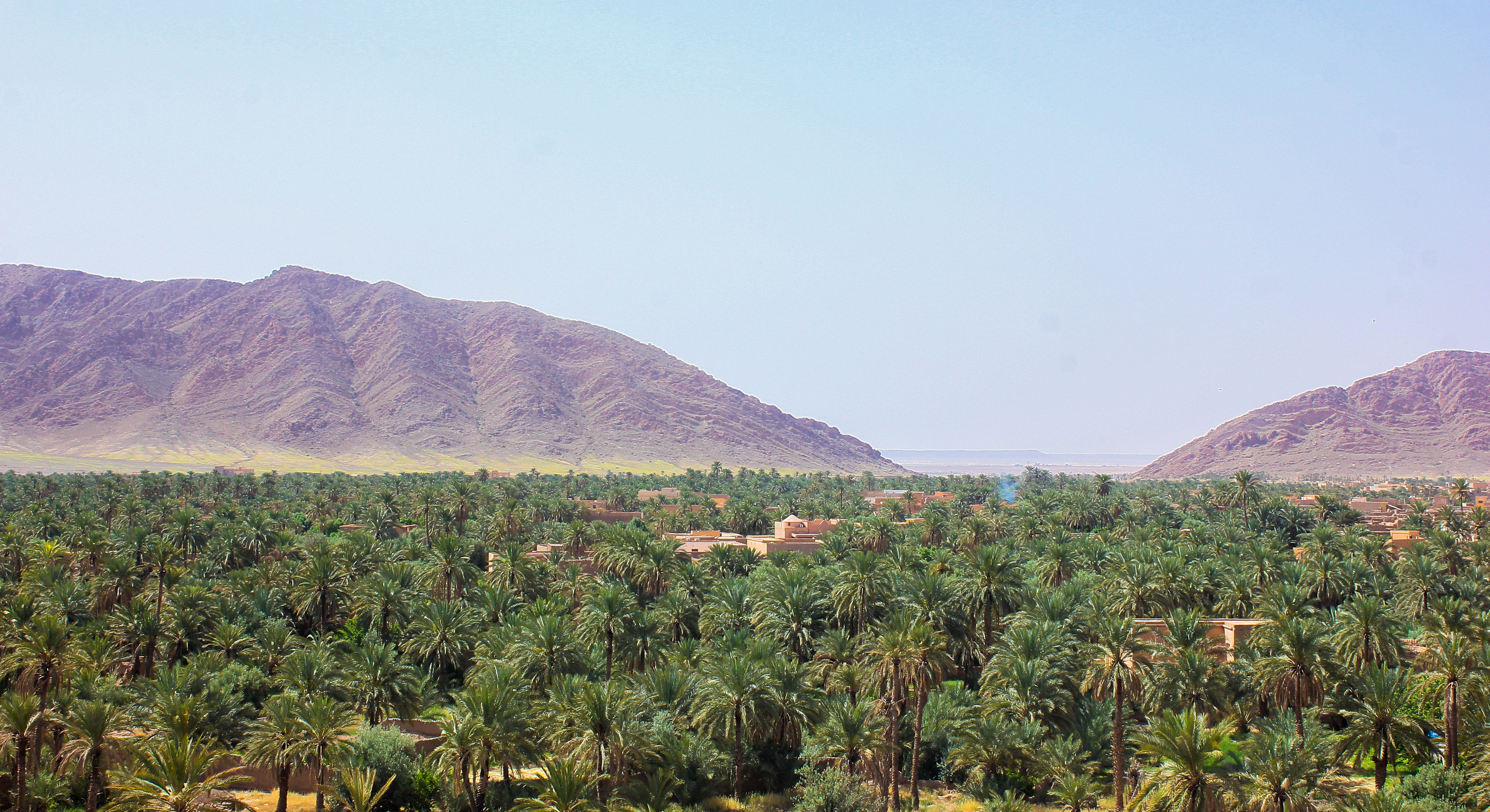
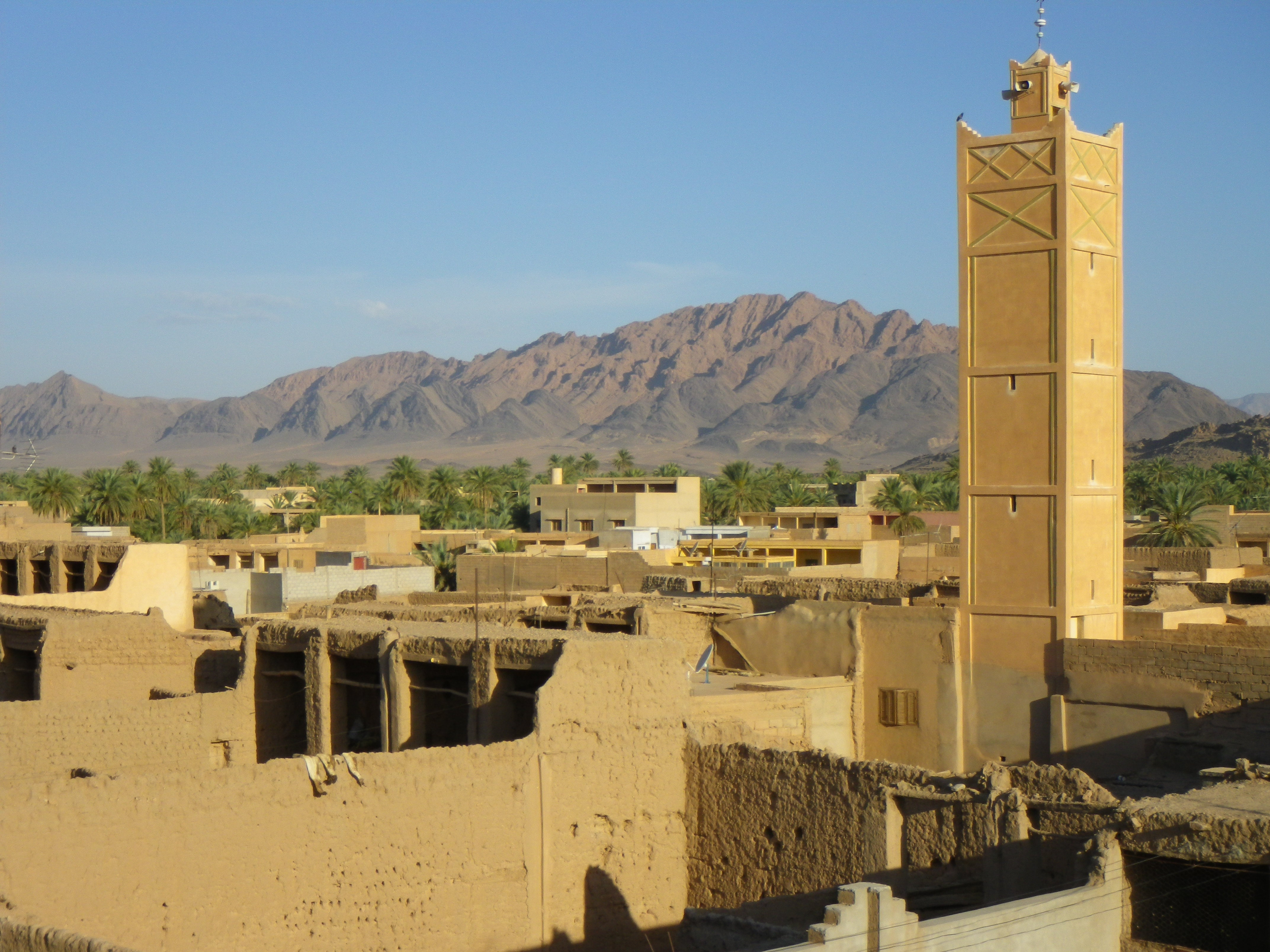
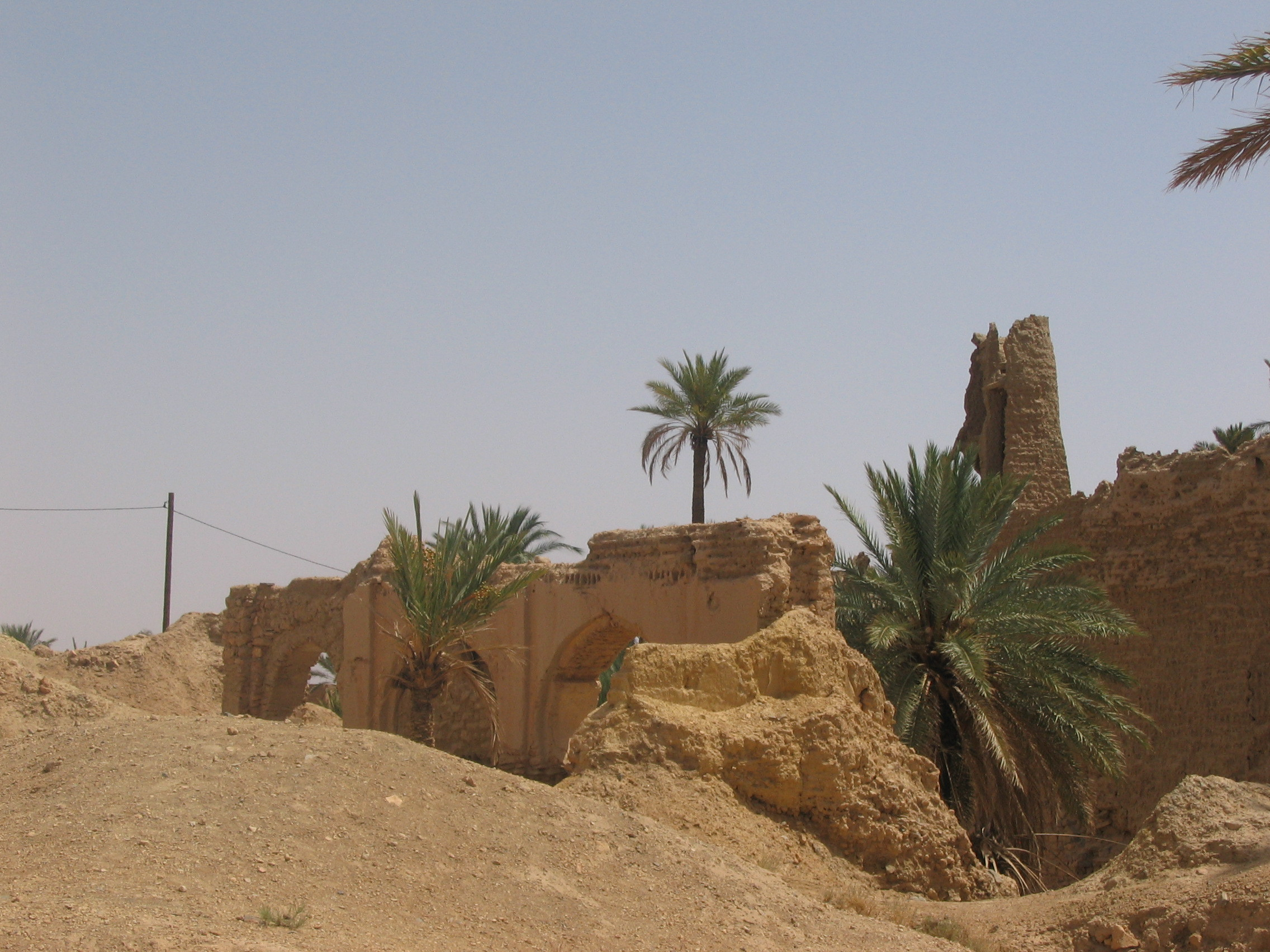
- Interactive map of Figuig
- Coordinates: 32°7′0″N 1°13′37″W
- Province of Figuig: Morocco
- Region: Eastern
- Province: Figuig

Government
  - Type: Moroccan

Area
  - Total: 200 km^{2} (77 sq mi)
- Elevation: 900 m (3,000 ft)

Population (2014)
  - Total: 10,872
  - Density: 54/km^{2} (140/sq mi)
- Time zone: UTC+0 (GMT)

Figuig (Note: Arabic: فجيج, romanized: Fijīj Standard Moroccan Tamazight: ⵉⴼⵢⵢⴻⵢ, romanized: ifyyey Figuig Berber: Ifeyyey) or Figig is an oasis town in eastern Morocco near the Atlas Mountains, on the border with Algeria.

The town is built around an oasis of date palms, surrounded by rugged, mountainous wilderness. Modernization has somewhat raised the standard of living, and drawn much of the town's population away, so that it is now struggling to reach stability. Its population in 2014 was 10,872, down from a peak of 14,571 in 1982.

The Ksour Range is a mountainous area extending between Figuig and El Bayadh.

== Population ==
In addition to Berber-speaking sedentary people, the population of the oases includes many marabouts who call themselves sharifs and have played an important role in social cohesion over the past centuries, softening feuds and quarrels between villages or within villages. A third element of the population is the Harratins gathered in Zenaga where they live in a particular neighborhood: Al-Hahda. They are workers of inferior status, responsible for the maintenance of the foggaras and, in general, the main agricultural works in the palm plantation. The descendants of slaves are often confused with the Harratins. The small Jewish Berber population, formerly gathered in the two mellahs of Zenaga and Udaghir, has practically disappeared. There were 5,000 subjects at the beginning of the twentieth century.

== Culture ==
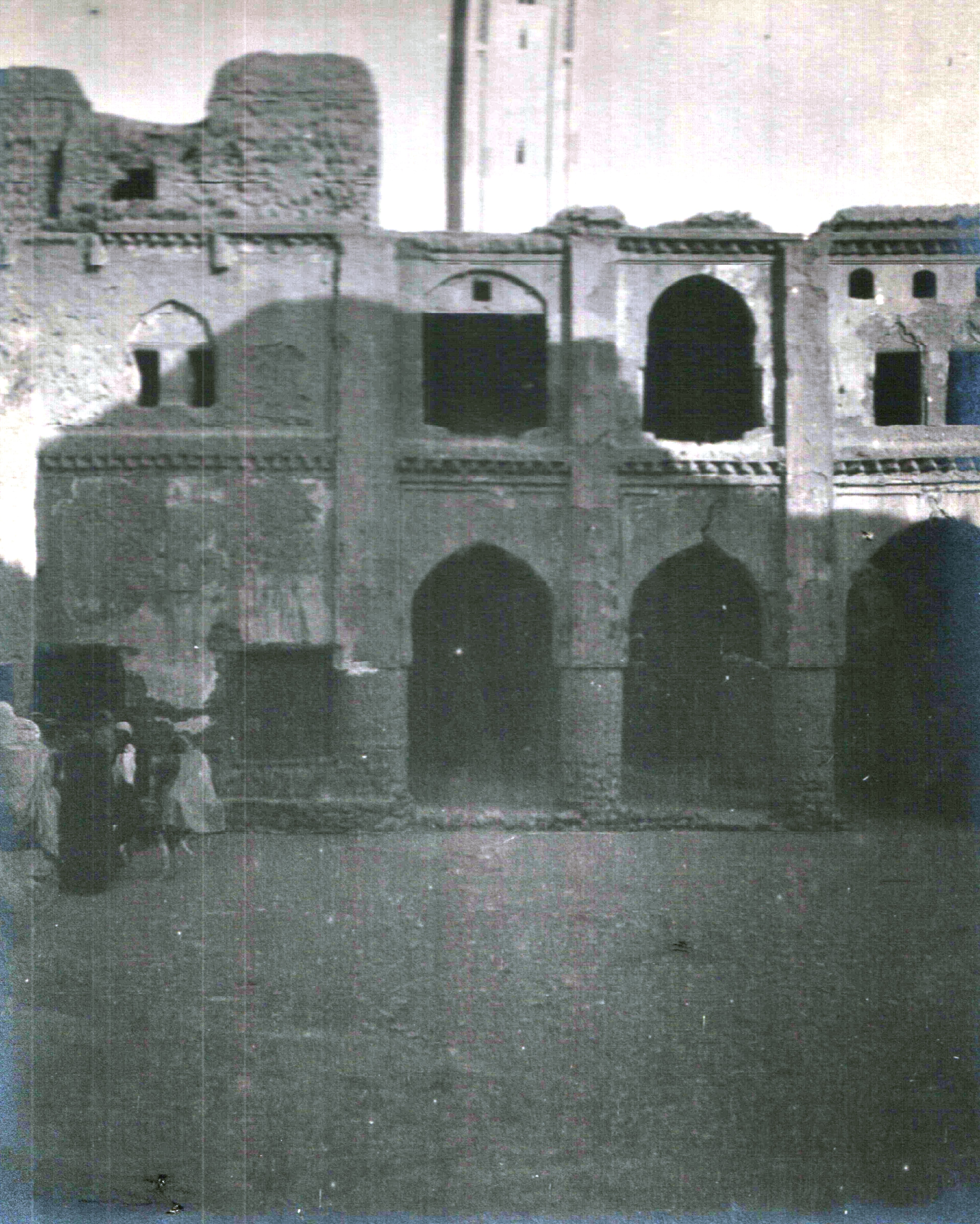
Figuig mosque in January 1913.

Aghrams are often centered on a plaza once used for communal gatherings and shopping. Arab nomads would exhibit merchandise like cooked butter (Udi), dried milk (Ibrassa), and sheep wool (Douft). However, due to lack of demand and western-influenced tastes, the plaza-markets have waned in both their variety and importance.

The akharbish education, often held near a mosque, had already been replaced by modern French schools since the establishment of the French colonisation. This trend has only been strengthened by the advantages a Western French education is perceived to confer, and as a result, knowledge of the Berber language has suffered.

The original mainly spoken language is Amazigh (a Berber language). Figuig's population are referred to as At-Ufyyey in that language. Amazigh is spoken but not written in Figuig.

== Agriculture ==
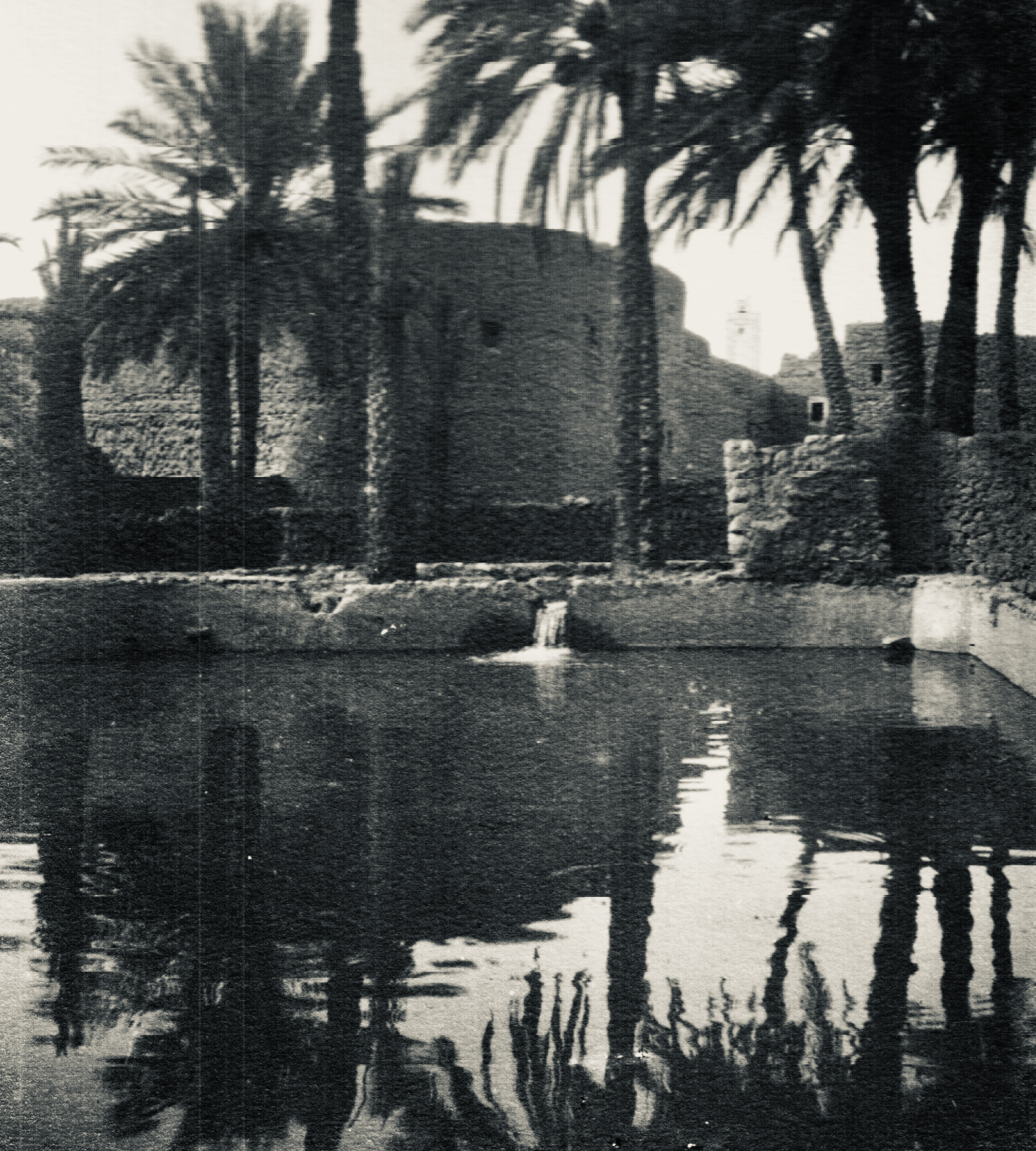
Cistern in Figuig (1913)

The town was established next to an oasis of date palms, and dates, or tiyni, are by far its most important resource. Some hundreds of thousands of date palms are cultivated in the area, and their fruit has become Figuig's primary crop. In the 1960s and 1970s however, Figuig had lost countless date palms because of the Bayud disease.

Wheat, or tasharza, is also an important product of the town. Its cultivation near the town assured a steady supply of the crucial grain which allowed for a higher quality of life. In order to increase arable land, many private farmers have constructed soil-filled stone terraces along the Jorf, a salt mountain nearby.

The Jorf is a sort of salt mountain about 1 kilometre long and 50 metres high. It is a nesting site of wild pigeons and bees, as well as scorpions and snakes, and is divided between several private landowners. The Jorf also serves to divide between the upper and lower portions of the town, and several thoroughfares connecting them run across it. The town's water-supply (aman) is drawn from its northern end, near the pass which serves as the main entrance to Figuig, and water can generally be found there at the shallow depth of 10 metres.

The water is conducted from its source via underground channels (lakbawat) to lime and stone or cement cisterns (sharij), from which farmers can utilise it at their convenience. The cisterns sometimes double as swimming holes to provide recreation for the local children.

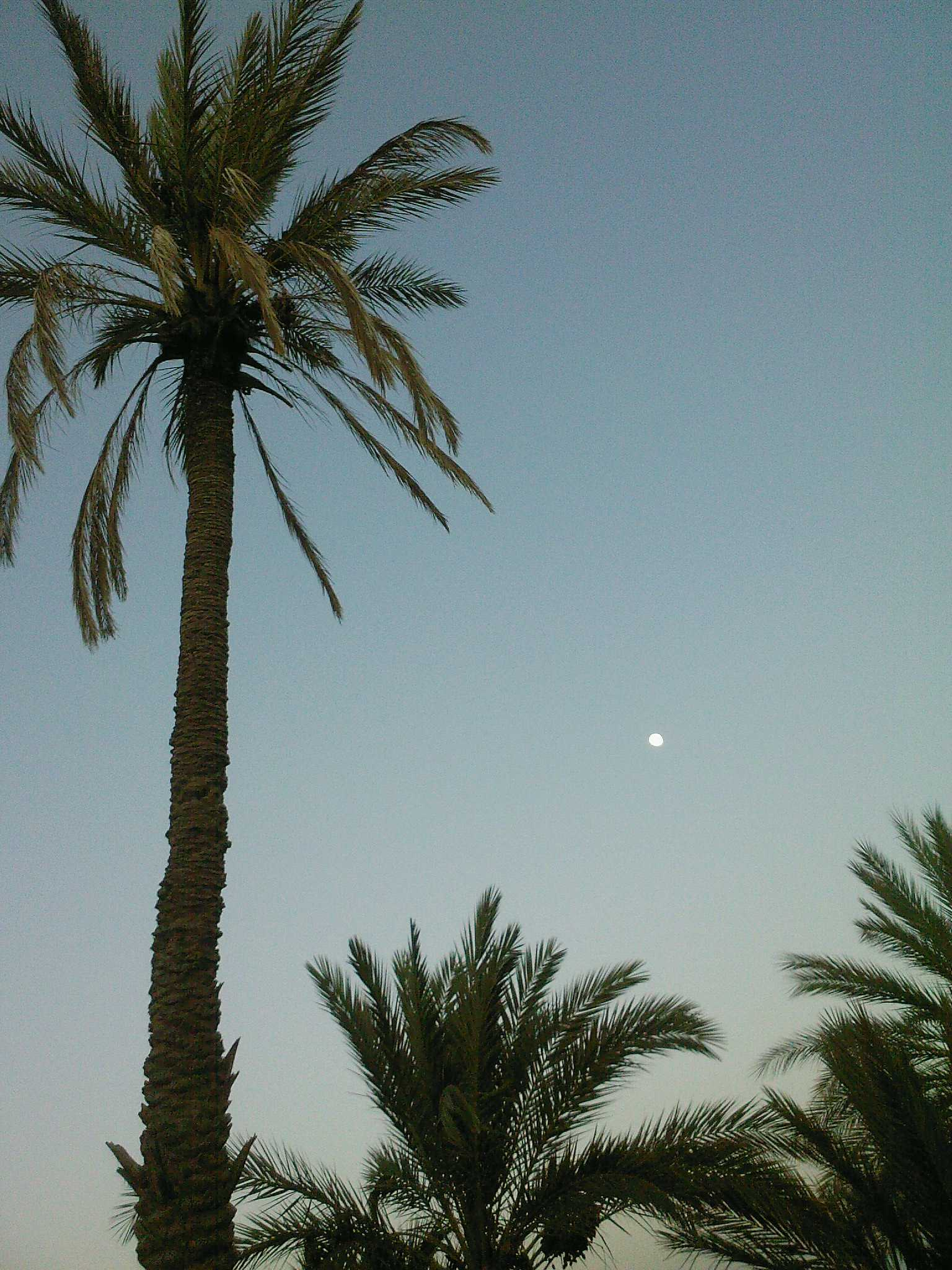
Palm trees and the moon in Figuig (2018)

== Modernization ==
New technologies such as cement and steel construction, as well as electricity, gas, telegraphs, cellular networks, digital satellite programming, and even Broadband Internet access, have made their way to Figuig. These developments have begun to bring the residents remaining in the town into close-contact with local culture, and the town has even seen the opening of several cafes.

A central bureaucracy, held-over from the French control, has supplanted the tribal structure as a center of Figuig's administration.

== Notable people ==
- Jamal Harkass - Professional footballer
- Mohammed Abed al-Jabri - Philosopher
- Cheikh Bouamama - Resistance leader

== See also ==
- Rock art of Figuig
