= Oued Guir =

Coordinates: 31°44′N 2°48′W

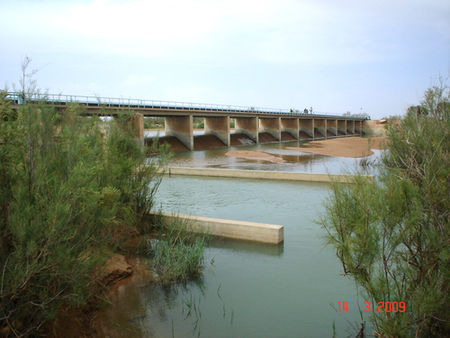

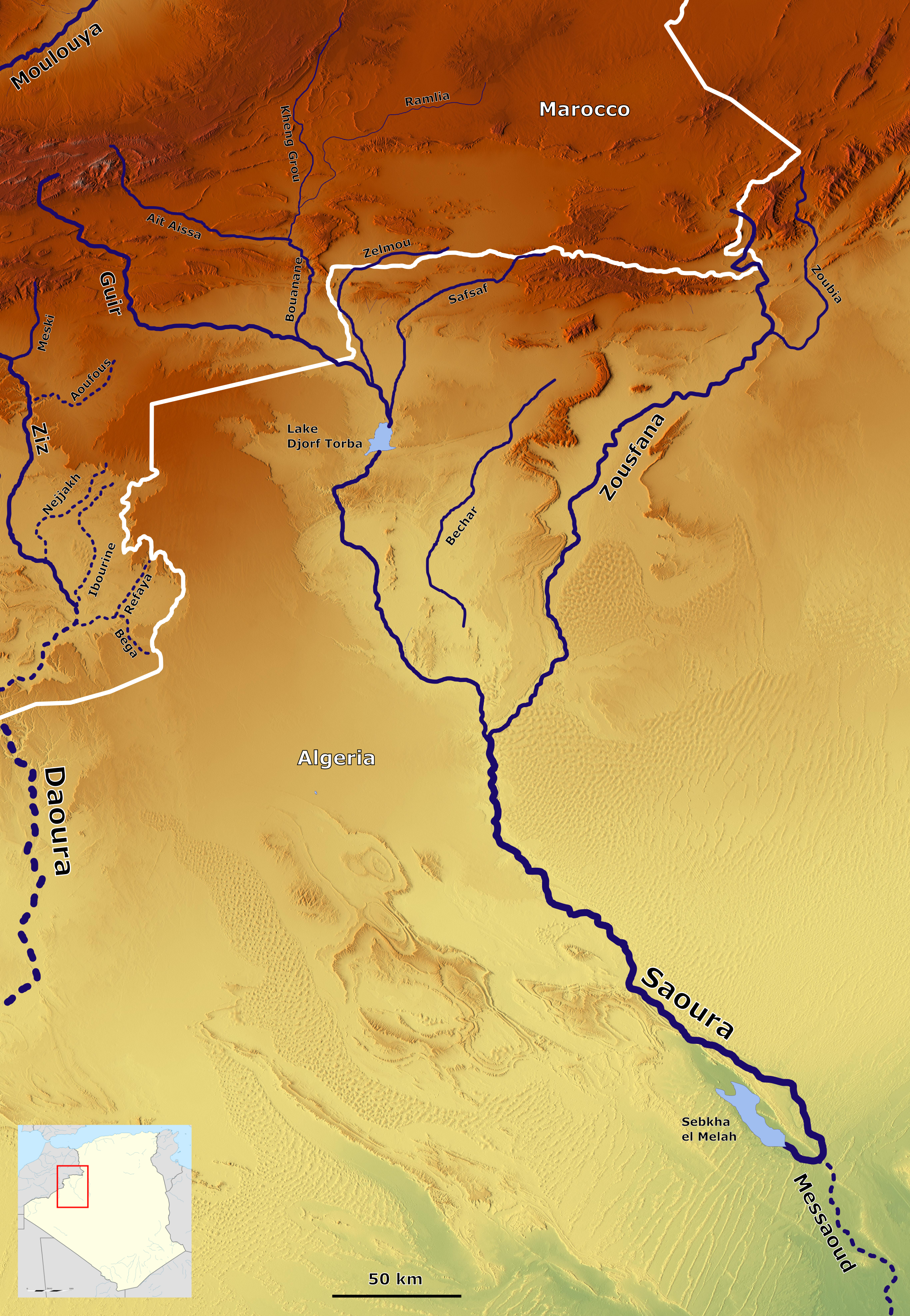
- The river system of the Saoura with the Guir (top left center)

Location
- Countries: Algeria and Morocco

Physical characteristics
- Source
  - location: Atlas Mountains near Gourrama
- Mouth
  - location: Oued Saoura at Igli
  - elevation: 498 m (1,634 ft)

Basin features
- Tributaries
  - right: Beni Yal, Oued Zelmou

Oued Guir is an intermittent river or wadi that flows through the Drâa-Tafilalet and Oriental regions in southeastern Morocco and Béchar Province in western Algeria.

== Course ==
The Oued Guir originates high in the Atlas Mountains 22 kilometres (14 mi) northeast of the town of Gourrama, Drâa-Tafilalet, then flows south to Boudenib and turns east, crossing into Oriental Region. Here it meets the Beni Yal and Oued Zelmou and turns south to the border with Algeria. After entering Algeria, the river enters the Djorf Torba dam, then continues past Abadla to Igli, where it merges with the Oued Zouzfana to form the Oued Saoura.

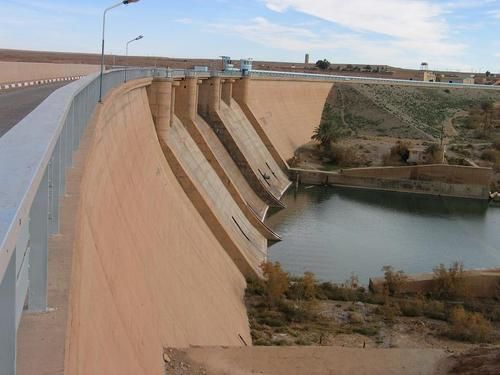
Djorf Torba Reservoir

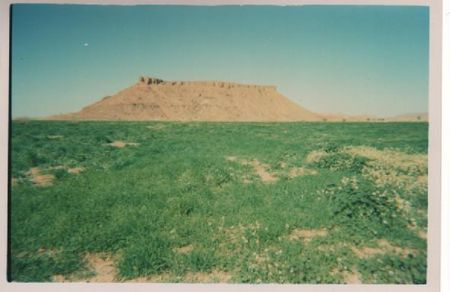
The Guir valléy, Algeria
