= Béchar Province =

Province of Algeria

Béchar Province ولاية بشار
- Province
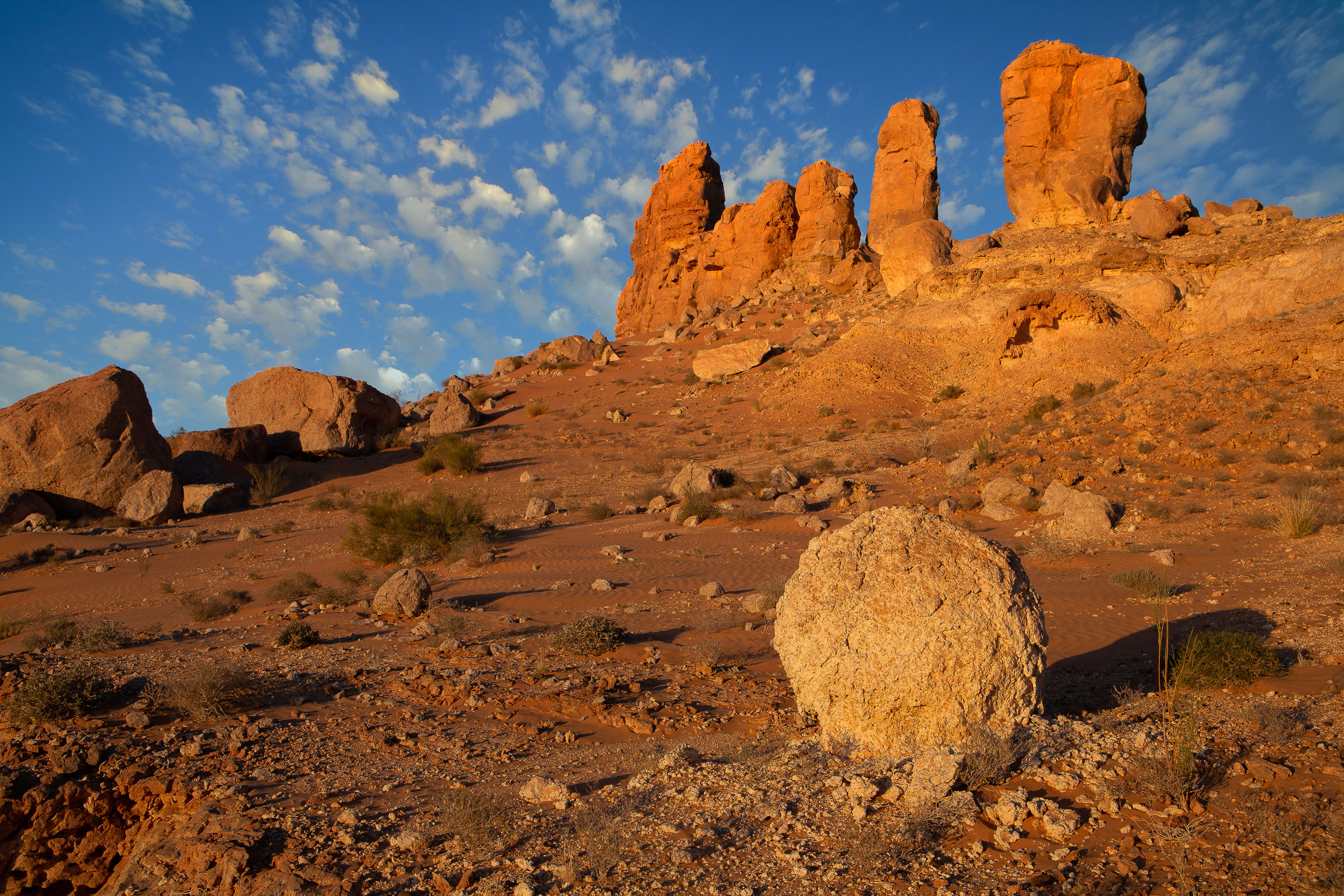
- The desert in Béchar

- Map of Algeria highlighting Béchar
- Coordinates: 31°20′N 1°55′W
- Country: Algeria
- Capital: Béchar

Government
  - Wāli: Mr. Mecheri Azzedine

Area
  - Total: 60,850 km^{2} (23,490 sq mi)
- Elevation: 605 m (1,985 ft)

Population (2008)
  - Total: 274,866
  - Density: 4.517/km^{2} (11.70/sq mi)
- Time zone: UTC+01 (CET)
- Area Code: +213 (0) 29
- ISO 3166 code: DZ-08
- Districts: 12
- Municipalities: 21

Béchar (Arabic: ولاية بشار) is a province (wilaya) in Algeria, located on the border with Morocco in the Algerian Sahara. It is the second least densely populated province in Algeria, with a population of 353 591 inhabitants in 2019, with a density of 2,19 people/square kilometer. Its capital and biggest city is Béchar.

== History ==
Historically, Bechar was not occupied until an expedition sent by the Bey of the West discovered water in the area.

The greater part of the province is dry plains (hamadas) suitable for grazing but with insufficient surface water to support agriculture. Most settlements are therefore concentrated in oases along the Saoura valley and its tributaries. Natural resources include coal deposits in the north around Bechar and Kenadsa.

The oases' traditional economic basis was agriculture, notably growing date palms and grain. The inhabitants of several oases, notably Ouakda, Lahmar and Boukais, speak Berber languages, while the rest speak Arabic and Korandje. Many of the oases had significant populations of shurfa or Haratin peoples. There is a notable zaouia (traditional religious school) at Kenadsa. The region also supported a substantial mainly Arab pastoralist nomadic population, notably the Doui-Menia and Ouled Djerir; most or all have settled in the oases.

Trans-Saharan trade routes passing through this region played an important role in its economy in pre-modern times, but have at present been superseded. A small tourism industry exists, focused particularly on Taghit. Béchar, whose growth from a minor village began only in the early 20th century, has become the principal urban and administrative centre.

Disagreements between Morocco and Algeria over their mutual border in this province and Tindouf led to conflict after Algeria's independence, the so-called Sand War.

The province was created from the Saoura department in 1974. In 1984 Tindouf Province was carved out of its territory and in 2019 Béni Abbès Province followed.

The region has a distinctive musical scene influenced by sub-Saharan African rhythms.

== Administrative divisions ==
The province is made up of 6 districts and 11 municipalities.

The districts are:

1. Abadla
2. Béchar
3. Béni Ounif
4. Kénadsa
5. Lahmar
6. Taghit

The municipalities are:

1. Abadla
2. Béchar
3. Beni Ounif
4. Boukais
5. Erg Ferradj
6. Kenadsa
7. Lahmar
8. Mechraa Houari Boumedienne
9. Meridja
10. Mogheul
11. Taghit
