= El Maffa =

- Village
- Location within Algeria
- Coordinates: 29°50′12″N 1°46′50″W
- Country: Algeria
- Province: Béni Abbès Province
- District: El Ouata District
- Commune: El Ouata
- Elevation: 425 m (1,394 ft)
- Time zone: UTC+1 (CET)

El Maffa (also written El Maja) is a village in the commune of El Ouata, Béni Abbès Province, Algeria. The village is located on the northeast bank of the Oued Saoura 5 kilometres (3.1 mi) southeast of El Ouata. It is connected to El Ouata by a local road along the side of the river, along with the other villages Ammas, Aguedal and El Beïda.
