= Idigh =

- Village
- Location within Algeria
- Coordinates: 29°53′37″N 1°51′18″W
- Country: Algeria
- Province: Béni Abbès Province
- District: Béni Abbès District
- Commune: Tamtert
- Elevation: 438 m (1,437 ft)
- Time zone: UTC+1 (CET)

Idigh (also written Idirh) is a village in the commune of Tamtert, in Béni Abbès District, Béni Abbès Province, Algeria. The village is located on a local road on the north-eastern bank of the Oued Saoura, about halfway between Tamtert and El Ouata.
