= Béchir =

- Village
- Location within Algeria
- Coordinates: 29°55′55″N 1°57′43″W
- Country: Algeria
- Province: Béni Abbès Province
- District: El Ouata District
- Commune: Tamtert
- Elevation: 448 m (1,470 ft)
- Time zone: UTC+1 (CET)

Béchir is a village in the commune of Tamtert, in El Ouata District, Béni Abbès Province, Algeria. The village lies on the Oued Saoura 7 kilometres (4.3 mi) northwest of Tamtert and 29 kilometres (18 mi) southeast of Béni Abbès.
