= Bouhadid =

- Village
- Location within Algeria
- Coordinates: 29°52′28″N 1°50′18″W
- Country: Algeria
- Province: Béni Abbès Province
- District: El Ouata District
- Commune: El Ouata
- Elevation: 433 m (1,421 ft)
- Time zone: UTC+1 (CET)

Bouhadid is a village in the commune of El Ouata, in Béni Abbès Province, Algeria. The village is located on the northeast bank of the Oued Saoura just north of El Ouata, and southeast of Tamtert.
