= Aguedal =

- Village
- Location within Algeria
- Coordinates: 29°48′37″N 1°44′52″W
- Country: Algeria
- Province: Béni Abbès Province
- District: El Ouata District
- Commune: El Ouata
- Elevation: 428 m (1,404 ft)
- Time zone: UTC+1 (CET)

Aguedal is a village in the commune of El Ouata, in Béni Abbès Province, Algeria. The village is located on the northeast bank of the Oued Saoura 9 kilometres (5.6 mi) southeast of El Ouata. It is connected to El Ouata by a local road along the side of the river, along with the other villages Ammas, El Maffa and El Beïda.
