= Tamtert =

Tamtert ﺗﺎﻣﺘﺮت
- Commune and town
- Location of Tamtert commune within Béchar Province

- Location of Tamtert within Algeria
- Coordinates: 29°54′37″N 1°53′25″W
- Country: Algeria
- Province: Béni Abbès Province
- District: Béni Abbès District

Area
  - Total: 3,130 km^{2} (1,210 sq mi)
- Elevation: 454 m (1,490 ft)

Population (2008)
  - Total: 1,249
  - Density: 0.399/km^{2} (1.03/sq mi)
- Time zone: UTC+1 (CET)

Tamtert (Arabic: تامترت), also written Tamert or Tamatart is a town and commune in Béni Abbès District, Béni Abbès Province, in western Algeria. According to the 2008 census its population is 1,248, down from 1,302 in 1998, with an annual growth rate of -0.4%. The commune covers an area of 3,130 square kilometres (1,210 sq mi).

== Geography ==
Tamtert lies at an elevation of 454 metres (1,490 ft) on the left (northeast) bank of the Oued Saoura in the Saoura valley. The Grand Erg Occidental, a large area of continuous sand dunes lies to the east, while the rocky ridges of the Ougarta Range rise to the west, running from northwest to southeast along the opposite side of the river from the town beyond a barren, rocky plain.

== Climate ==
Tamtert has a hot desert climate (Köppen climate classification BWh), with extremely hot summers and warm winters, and very little precipitation throughout the year.

== Economy ==
Agriculture is the main industry in Tamtert. The commune has a total of 869 hectares (2,150 acres) of arable land, of which 784 hectares (1,940 acres) is irrigated. There are a total of 26,250 date palms planted in the commune. As of 2009 there were 270 sheep, 744 goats, and 585 camels. There were also 8,400 chickens.

== Infrastructure and housing ==
90% of Tamtert's population is connected to drinking water, 90% is connected to the sewerage system, and 99% (including 271 buildings) have access to electricity. There are no one fuel services station in the town; the nearest is in El Ouata.

Tamtert has a total of 364 houses, of which 165 are occupied, giving an occupation rate of 7.6 inhabitants per occupied building.

== Transportation ==
Tamtert is connected by a local road to the N6 national highway between Béchar to the northwest and Adrar to the southeast. Towns accessible to the north via the N6 include Béni Abbès and Igli, while to the south the towns of El Ouata, Béni Ikhlef, Kerzaz, and Ouled Khoudir can be accessed. Local roads also connect the town directly to the district centers of Béni Abbès and El Ouata.

Tamtert is 271 kilometres (168 mi) by road from the provincial capital, Béchar, 57 kilometres (35 mi) from the district capital, Béni Abbès, and 15 kilometres (9.3 mi) from the nearest town, El Ouata. There is a total length of 43 kilometres (27 mi) of roads in the commune.

== Education ==
There are 3 elementary schools, with 15 classrooms including 13 in use. There are a total of 105 school students; secondary students study in Béni Abbès or El Ouata.

5.1% of the population has a tertiary education, and another 14.3% has competed secondary education. The overall literacy rate is 73.4%, and is 81.9% among males and 65.5% among females.

== Health ==
Tamtert has very few health facilities, with just one room care facility. The nearest polyclinics are in El Ouata, and the nearest hospital is in Béni Abbès.

== Religion ==
Tamtert has 3 operational mosques, with another 2 under construction.

== Localities ==
The commune is composed of four localities:

- Tamtert
- Béchir
- Marhouma
- Idigh

Béchir and Marhouma lie along the Oued Saoura to the northwest between Tamtert town and Béni Abbès, while Idigh lies to the southeast about halfway to El Ouata.
