= Zerhamra =

- Village
- Location within Algeria
- Coordinates: 29°59′18″N 2°29′24″W
- Country: Algeria
- Province: Béni Abbès Province
- District: Béni Abbès District
- Commune: Béni Abbès
- Elevation: 513 m (1,683 ft)
- Time zone: UTC+1 (CET)

Zerhamra (also written Zaghamra) is a village in the commune of Béni Abbès, in Béni Abbès Province, Algeria. It lies beneath the Ougarta Range of the Sahara desert. A local road connects the village to the N6 highway near the town of Béni Abbès 35 kilometres (22 mi) to the northeast.

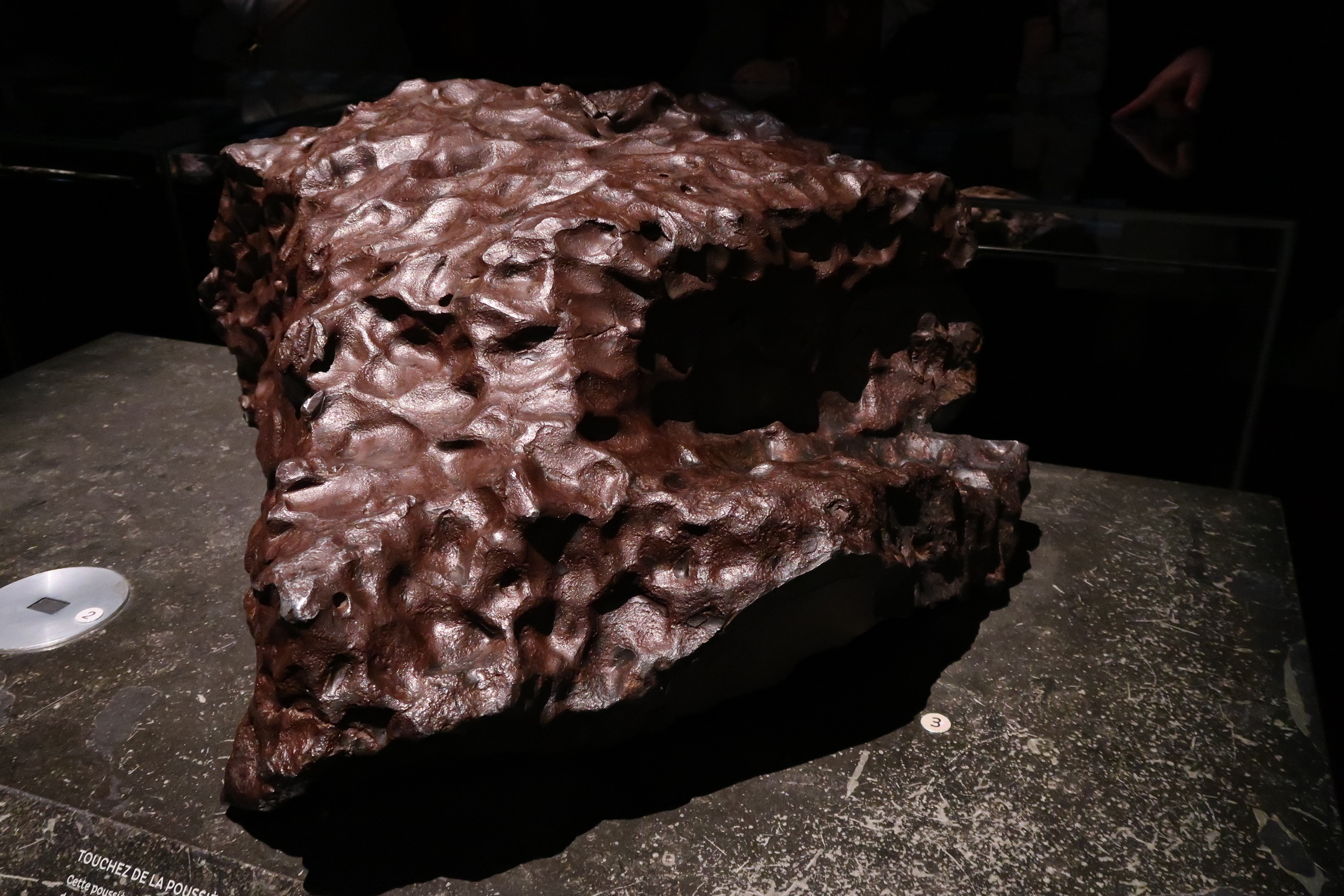
The Zerhamra meteorite - a 640-kilogram (1,410 lb) block of Siderite found in 1967, 22 kilometres (14 mi) away from the Oasis. Musée des Confluences, Lyon, France

Zerhamra is also the name of a 640-kilogram (1,410 lb) meteorite discovered in 1967, 22 kilometres (14 mi) away from the village. A Siderite (Group III AB), the heavy meteorite is a portion of the metallic core of a celestial body which fragmented during a powerful collision. The characteristic shape of the surface is indicative of erosion.
