= Sebkha el Melah, Béni Abbès =

Salt lake in Béni Abbès Province, Algeria

Sebkha el Melah
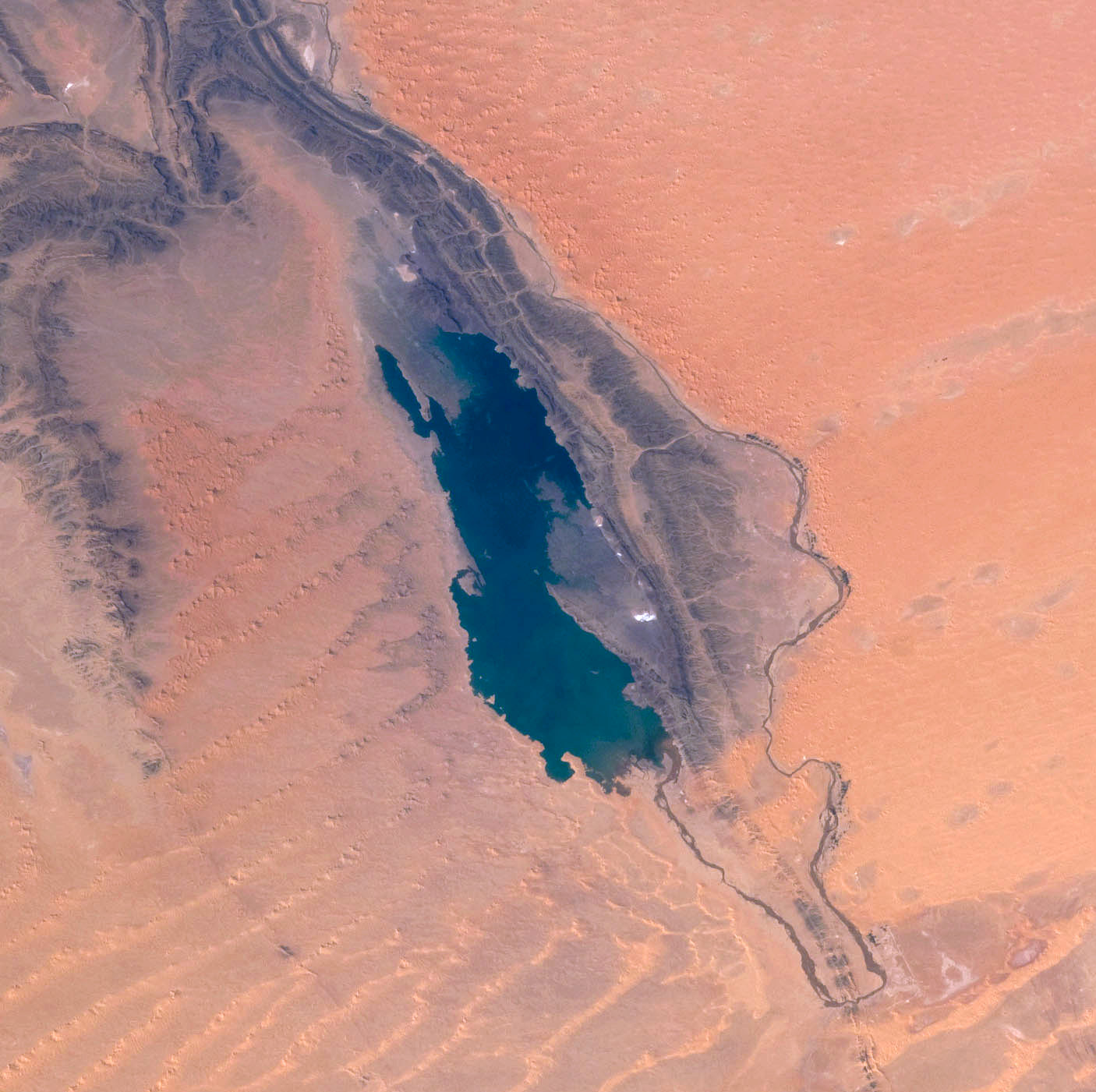
- View of lake taken during ISS Expedition 18

- Location within Algeria
- Location: Béni Abbès, Algeria
- Coordinates: 29°11′42″N 1°14′33″W
- Type: Endorheic salt lake
- Primary inflows: Oued Saoura
- Basin countries: Algeria

Location of Sebkha el Melah in Algeria

Sebkha el Melah, also known as Sebkha de Kerzaz, is an endorheic salt lake in Béni Abbès Province, southwestern Algeria. The Oued Saoura drains into the lake.

The lake is located near Kerzaz, about 120 km (75 mi) southeast of Béni Abbès.

== Geography ==
Sebkha el Melah is a salt lake that has formed in a basin in Béni Abbès Province in southwestern Algeria, to the south of the Atlas Mountains. The rocky ridge of the Ougarta Range lies to the west and the sand dunes of the Grand Erg Occidental to the east. Sebkha itself has an annual precipitation of about 20 mm (0.8 in), which is much less than the Saharan Atlas to the north (150 mm (6 in)). The lake is fed by the seasonal river Oued Saoura but most of the year the volume of water evaporated from the surface exceeds the volume of water flowing in, and a salt crust is formed. The basin has no outflow, and because the source of the water is continental rather than marine, the amount of salt deposited is limited.

The bottom of the sabkha is usually dry and covered with a salty crust, mostly formed from halite. Periodically, heavy rains cause the Saoura to flood and water flows into the sabkha. Total dissolved solids increase as the crust partially dissolves and evaporation occurs. Some water infiltrates the clayey ground forming an impervious layer under which is an aquifer, saturated as far as sodium chloride is concerned. Evaporation of the water in the lake occurs, and after a few months, the sabkha dries up, and a new crust is formed.
