= Ougarta =

- Village
- Location within Algeria
- Coordinates: 29°39′44″N 2°16′29″W
- Country: Algeria
- Province: Béni Abbès Province
- District: Béni Abbès District
- Commune: Béni Abbès
- Elevation: 409 m (1,342 ft)

Population
  - Total: 250
- Time zone: UTC+1 (CET)

Ougarta or Lougarta is an oasis and a village in the commune of Béni Abbès, in Béni Abbès Province, Algeria. It is 50 kilometres (31 mi) southwest of the town of Béni Abbès and about 250 kilometres (160 mi) south of Béchar, the capital of the province. Ougarta has a population of about 250 inhabitants. The village has given its name to the Ougarta Range which surrounds the village. A local road connects the village to the N6 highway near Béni Abbès.

== Notes and references ==
Neighbouring towns and cities
