= Marhouma =

- Village
- Location within Algeria
- Coordinates: 30°0′22″N 2°3′10″W
- Country: Algeria
- Province: Béni Abbès Province
- District: El Ouata District
- Commune: Tamtert
- Elevation: 457 m (1,499 ft)
- Time zone: UTC+1 (CET)

Map of rock art in the Sahara

Marhouma is a village in the commune of Tamtert, in El Ouata District, Béni Abbès Province, Algeria. The village lies on the Oued Saoura 19 kilometres (12 mi) northwest of Tamtert and 18 kilometres (11 mi) southeast of Béni Abbès. It is notable for nearby rock engravings.
