= Ghenanma =

Arab tribe in Algeria

The Ghenanma (Arabic غنانمة) are an Arab tribe of the Saoura region in southwestern Algeria. Their principal settlements (ksars) stretch between Béni Abbès and Talmine, including El Ouata. A local chronicle mentions them as raiding a caravan in this region in 1599, and by about 1660 their power had grown to the point that they were imposing taxes on the Touat oases. They continued to play a significant role in Touat's politics into the 19th century, through both treaties of protection and raids.
