= Wheelbarrow Across The Sahara =

1992 book by Geoffrey Howard

- Author: Geoffrey Howard
- Publisher: Sutton Publishing
- Publication date: 1992
- ISBN: 978-0-586-21377-3

Wheelbarrow Across The Sahara is a book written by Geoffrey Howard, giving the account of his journey across the Sahara Desert. The book was first published by Alan Sutton Publishing (now Sutton Publishing) and then in paperback by Grafton. His journey was covered by British and international media.

Geoffrey Howard was an Anglican clergyman who walked 1946 miles from Beni Abbes in Algeria to Kano in Nigeria, carrying his food and water in a specially built wheelbarrow, loosely based on the design of a Chinese sailing carriage. The walk took 93 days, from 20 December 1974 to 23 March 1975.

In 2017, the book was reprinted and made available in paperback from Amazon and for Kindle. The author's royalties are donated to the British charity "Water for Kids".

Geoffrey Howard went on to write:

- "Dare to Break Bread" - Eucharist in Desert and City (ISBN 978-1520163376).
- "Weep Not For Me" - Stations of the Cross in Holy Land and City (ISBN 978-1520361314).
- "Cantona - Ooh Ah" - A short surreal story involving Eric Cantona and the Pope (ISBN 978-0993594557).
