= Beni Abbes Museum =

- Béni Abbès Museum
- Location: Beni Abbes, Béchar Province, Algeria
- Type: Art museum
- Collections: It is "a resource dedicated to desert fauna, fossils and Algerian arts and crafts

Beni Abbes Museum, also known as Béni Abbès Museum (Arabic: متحف بني عباس, romanized: Matḥaf Banī ʻAbbās) is an art museum located in oasis town of Beni Abbes, Béchar Province, Algeria. It is "a resource dedicated to desert fauna, fossils and Algerian arts and crafts."

== Displays ==
Béni Abbès Museum is popular in Algeria. It is supported by the Saharan Research Center. The museum houses displays desert fauna, fossils and traditional arts and crafts, such as carpets, wall hangings, ceramic items, woodcarvings and jewelry. The museum, which is supported by the Saharan Research Center, displays an extensive range of different types of dates. Dates are one of the mainstay crops of oasis towns and villages in Algeria.

== Myth ==
The oasis of Beni Abbes has its own myth. Local people claim that:

“The spring which waters this lush oasis came about as a miracle. It is said that a traveler pushed his walking-stick into the ground, declaring that if he should die in this place, water would come out of the ground. He apparently died the following night, possibly due to lack of water, and the spring began to flow, continuing to do so to this day”.

== Tourist destination ==
The town of Beni Abbès is a popular tourist destination and the museum provides insights into its history and culture.

== See also ==
- Béni Abbès
- List of museums in Algeria
