= Béni Abbès District =

Béni Abbès District دائرة بني عباس
- District
- Location of Béni Abbès within Béchar Province
- Coordinates: 30°8′N 2°10′E
- Country: Algeria
- Province: Béni Abbès
- District seat: Béni Abbès

Area
  - Total: 13,170 km^{2} (5,080 sq mi)

Population (2008)
  - Total: 12,134
  - Density: 0.9213/km^{2} (2.386/sq mi)
- Time zone: UTC+01 (CET)
- Municipalities: 2

Béni Abbès is a district in Béchar Province, Algeria. It was named after its capital, Béni Abbès. According to the 2008 census, the total population of the district was 12,134 inhabitants. The population lives almost exclusively on the banks of the Oued Saoura; to the northeast is the uninhabited Grand Erg Occidental, while to the southwest is the rocky hamada and the mountainous Ougarta Range. The N6 is the main road through the district, running from northwest to southeast.

== Municipalities ==
The district is further divided into 2 communes:

- Béni Abbès
- Tamtert
