= El Beïda =

- Village
- Location within Algeria
- Coordinates: 29°47′40″N 1°44′53″W
- Country: Algeria
- Province: Béni Abbès Province
- District: El Ouata District
- Commune: El Ouata
- Elevation: 426 m (1,398 ft)
- Time zone: UTC+1 (CET)

El Beïda (sometimes written El Bayada) is a village in the commune of El Ouata, in Béni Abbès Province, Algeria. The village lies on the Oued Saoura 28 kilometres (17 mi) north of Béni Ikhlef and 11 kilometres (6.8 mi) southeast of El Ouata.
