= Saoura =

Algerian valley

Coordinates: 29°27′N 1°26′W

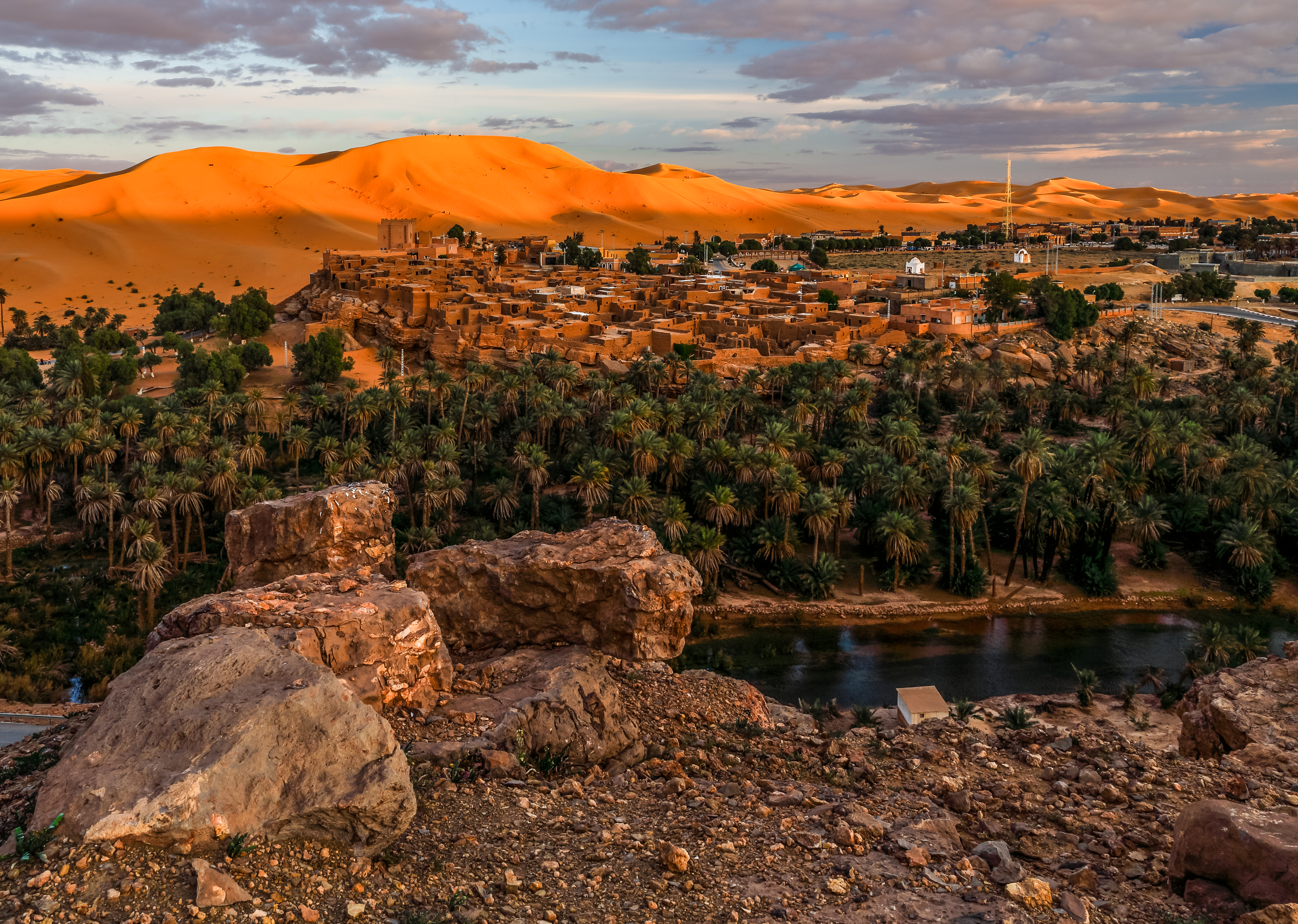
A picture of the Saoura

The Saoura (Arabic: ساورة) is a valley in southwestern Algeria. It is formed by the wadi known as Oued Saoura, formed from the confluence of the Oued Guir and Oued Zouzfana at Igli. From Igli it runs through Béchar Province past the towns of Béni Abbès, Tamtert, El Ouata, Béni Ikhlef, Kerzaz, Timoudi, Ouled Khoudir, and Ksabi then passes under the N6 highway before reaching the endorheic lake Sebkha el Melah. From 1962 to 1974 it was the name of a wilaya (province) covering present-day Béchar Province, Tindouf Province and Adrar Province.
