= Béni Abbès =

Town and commune in Béchar, Algeria

Béni Abbès بني عباس
- Commune and town
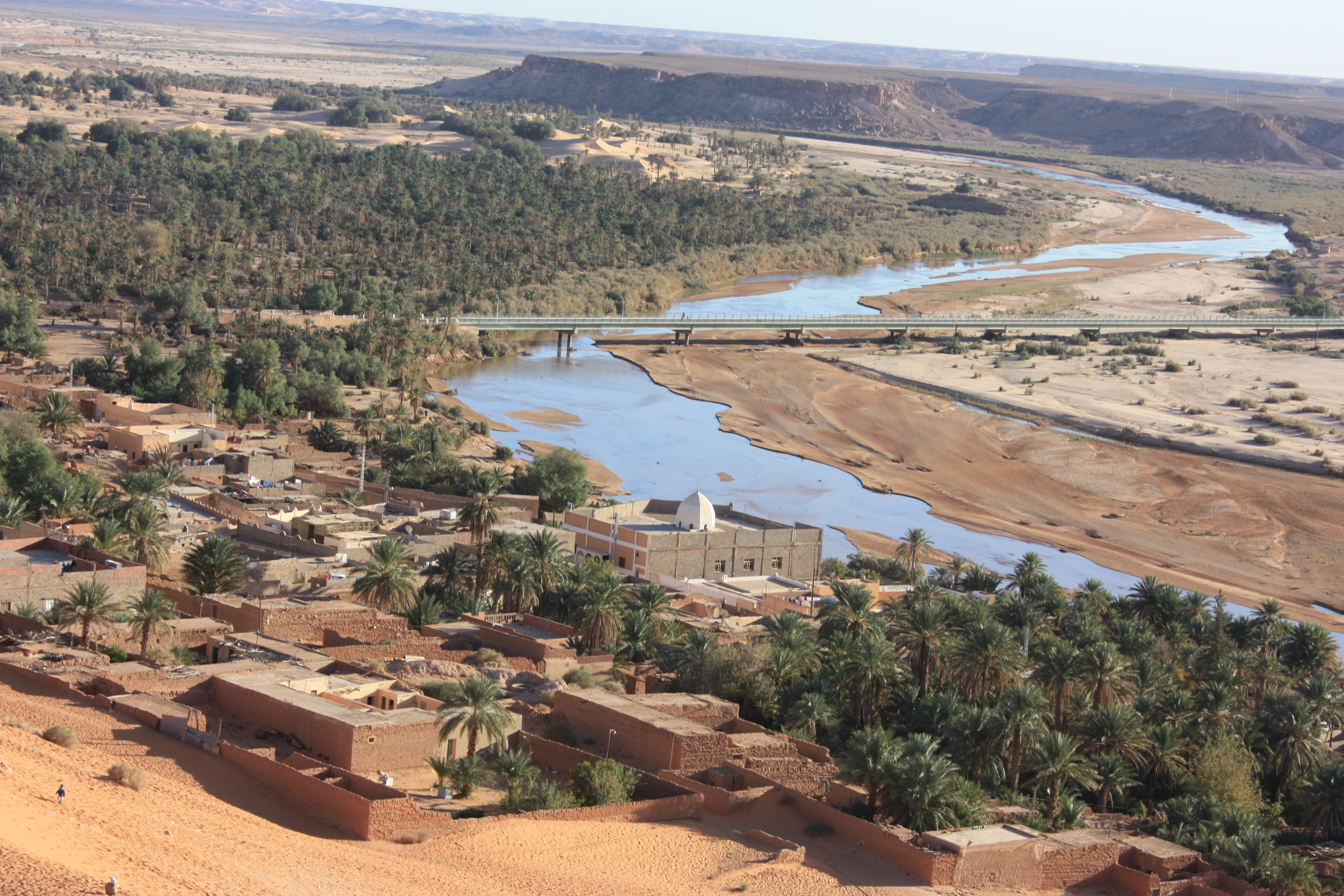
- View of Béni Abbès

- Location of Béni Abbès commune within Béchar Province

- Location of Béni Abbès within Algeria
- Coordinates: 30°4′48″N 2°6′0″W
- Country: Algeria
- Province: Béni Abbès
- District: Béni Abbès

Government
  - Type: Municipality
  - Mayor: Kebir Nadjib (2012-2017)

Area
  - Total: 10,040 km^{2} (3,880 sq mi)
- Elevation: 483 m (1,585 ft)

Population (2009)
  - Total: 11,416
- Time zone: UTC+1 (CET)
- Postal code: 08300
- ISO 3166 code: CP

Béni Abbès (Arabic: بني عباس), also known as the Pearl of the Saoura, and also as the White Oasis, is a town and commune located in western Algeria in Béchar Province, 241 km (150 mi) from the provincial capital Béchar, and 1,200 km (746 mi) from Algiers.

It has been the capital of the Béni Abbès District since 1957. The commune's area is approximately 10,040 km^{2} (3,880 sq mi), with a population of 10,885 inhabitants as of the 2008 census, up from 8,850 in 1998, and a population growth rate of 2.1%.

Béni Abbès lies in the Saoura valley, on the left bank of the intermittent wadi called Oued Saoura. There are seven ksars (castles) in Béni Abbès, including a particularly large one found in a palm grove in the river valley.

The people of Béni Abbès are often referred to as Abbabsa.

== Etymology ==
Béni Abbès is written in Arabic بني عباس, Bani Abbas ("The children of Abbas"). C. Rames explains in his book Beni-Abbes (Oran Sahara): Historical, geographical and medical study (1941) that the origin of the name comes from the name of the tribe of the city's first occupant : "Forty years after the death of Sidi Othman, in the distant Saguia el-Hamra (Western Sahara), El Mahdi Ben Youssef from the tribe of Beni Abbes".

The name actually derives from the similar Arabic بني العباس, Bani Al Abbas ("The children of El-abbas"). El Ayachi wrote in his manuscript Arrihla al ayachia (1662) : "Then we entered the villages of Bani Al Abbas ...".

== Geography ==
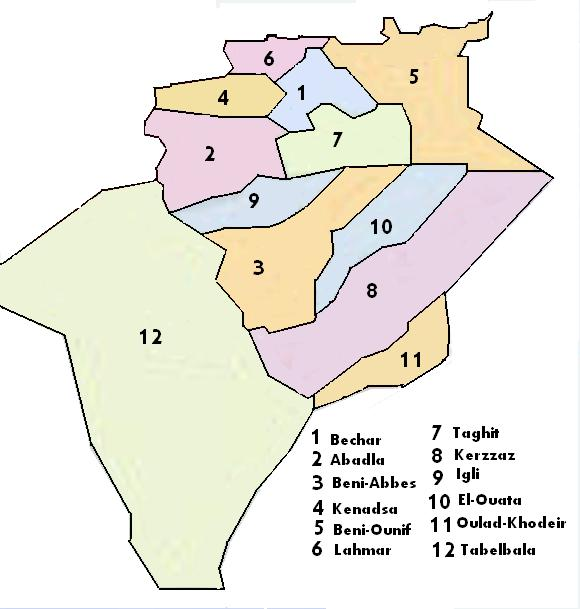
Geographic location of Béni Abbès in Béchar Province (N 3)

=== Location ===
Béni Abbès is built on a rocky hill on the left bank of Oued Saoura. The city is bordered to the north, east and west by the Grand Erg Occidental and south and southwest by the valley of the Saoura. The most interesting mountains near Béni Abbès are in the Ougarta Range (around the oasis of Ougarta) found around 50 kilometres (31 mi) to the south and southwest.

=== Climate ===
Béni Abbès has a hot and arid desert climate (Köppen climate classification BWh). There is usually very little rain, but occasional heavy rains can occur, causing flooding in the Oued Saoura. The sky is almost always blue both in winter and summer.

December, January and February are the coldest months, when it is between 4 °C (39 °F) and 18 °C (64 °F). During the summer months, temperatures can reach 45 °C (113 °F) with a humidity of about 10% during the day.

Climate data for Béni Abbès
Month	Jan	Feb	Mar	Apr	May	Jun	Jul	Aug	Sep	Oct	Nov	Dec	Year
Record high °C (°F)	29.0 (84.2)	34.3 (93.7)	37.3 (99.1)	39.6 (103.3)	44.4 (111.9)	46.8 (116.2)	48.8 (119.8)	47.0 (116.6)	44.4 (111.9)	39.0 (102.2)	36.7 (98.1)	28.1 (82.6)	48.8 (119.8)
Mean daily maximum °C (°F)	17.7 (63.9)	21.2 (70.2)	24.5 (76.1)	28.3 (82.9)	33.2 (91.8)	39.0 (102.2)	41.9 (107.4)	41.5 (106.7)	36.6 (97.9)	29.5 (85.1)	22.9 (73.2)	17.8 (64.0)	29.5 (85.1)
Daily mean °C (°F)	11.0 (51.8)	14.4 (57.9)	17.9 (64.2)	21.7 (71.1)	26.5 (79.7)	31.8 (89.2)	34.9 (94.8)	34.6 (94.3)	30.1 (86.2)	23.2 (73.8)	16.7 (62.1)	11.6 (52.9)	22.9 (73.2)
Mean daily minimum °C (°F)	4.3 (39.7)	7.6 (45.7)	11.3 (52.3)	15.0 (59.0)	19.8 (67.6)	24.6 (76.3)	27.9 (82.2)	27.6 (81.7)	23.5 (74.3)	16.8 (62.2)	10.4 (50.7)	5.2 (41.4)	16.2 (61.1)
Record low °C (°F)	−5.0 (23.0)	−1.8 (28.8)	2.0 (35.6)	2.0 (35.6)	9.0 (48.2)	13.4 (56.1)	13.5 (56.3)	18.3 (64.9)	11.0 (51.8)	4.0 (39.2)	0.0 (32.0)	−1.8 (28.8)	−5.0 (23.0)
Average precipitation mm (inches)	3.1 (0.12)	1.9 (0.07)	1.6 (0.06)	2.4 (0.09)	2.3 (0.09)	0.4 (0.02)	0.5 (0.02)	1.1 (0.04)	1.9 (0.07)	8.6 (0.34)	6.7 (0.26)	6.1 (0.24)	36.6 (1.42)
Average relative humidity (%)	43.2	36.3	29.2	25.0	22.7	18.3	15.5	18.0	24.8	34.2	40.1	46.7	29.5
Mean monthly sunshine hours	195.3	211.9	232.5	270.0	294.5	327.0	353.4	319.3	267.0	223.2	210.0	192.2	3,096.3
Mean daily sunshine hours	6.3	7.5	7.5	9.0	9.5	10.9	11.4	10.3	8.9	7.2	7.0	6.2	8.5
Source 1: NOAA (1967-1990)
Source 2: climatebase.ru (extremes, humidity) Arab Meteorology Book (sun)

=== Flora and fauna ===
The Saharan ecosystem dominates all the territory of Béni Abbès. Flora and fauna are not as extensive as in other parts of Algeria, however, a variety of plants and creatures have been found here. There is perhaps a surprising range of flora and fauna that can survive in this hot and arid climate.

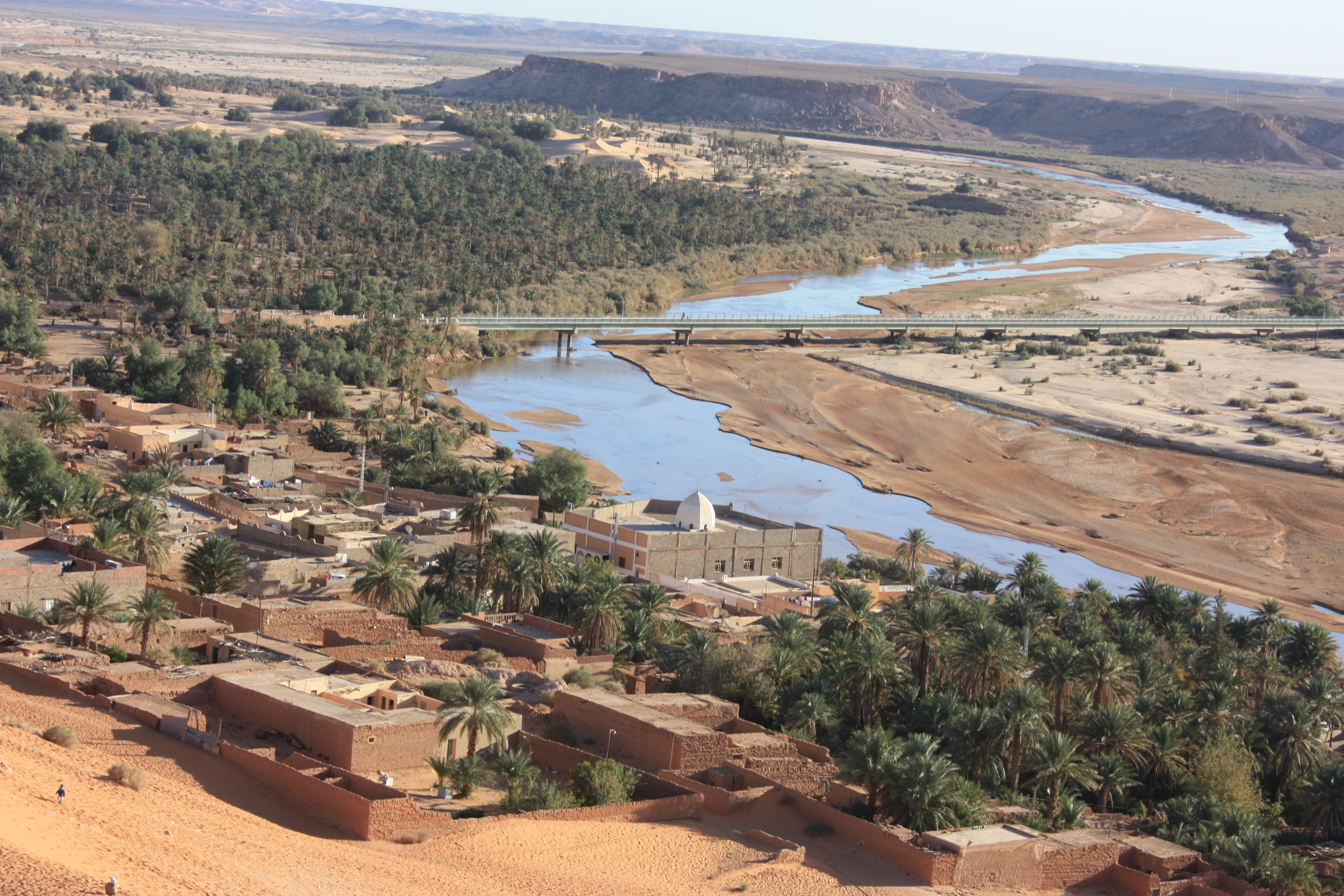
View of the Oued Saoura with the district of Safat and palms.

The vegetation of Béni Abbès consists mainly of xeric species. Infrequent rainfall affects the development of plants in the three different types of terrain types found near Béni Abbès: hamada, erg and wadi.

Acacia trees and wild herbs are scattered on the mountain and Hamada, especially near Zeghamra. Some wild herbs in the region are medicinal and used by people traditionally to treat many diseases. Among others, these include Ouezouaza (Santolina rosmarinifolea), Gartofa (Santolina chamaycyparissus), Shih (Artemisia herba-alba), and Terfesse (Terfeziaceae), a mushroom used by the Abbassian cuisine to replace meat.

An excellent dune-fixing plant Rtéme (Retama raetam) grows on ergs. The predominant plant of the Wadi is the Fnine (Tamarix), a plant resistant to saline soils.

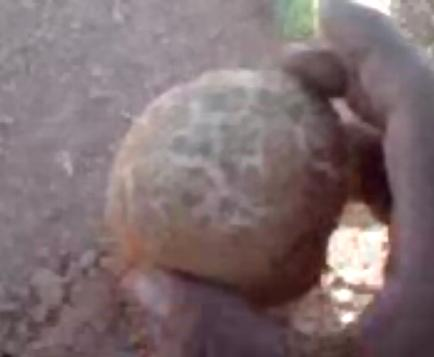
Terfesse (Terfeziaceae)

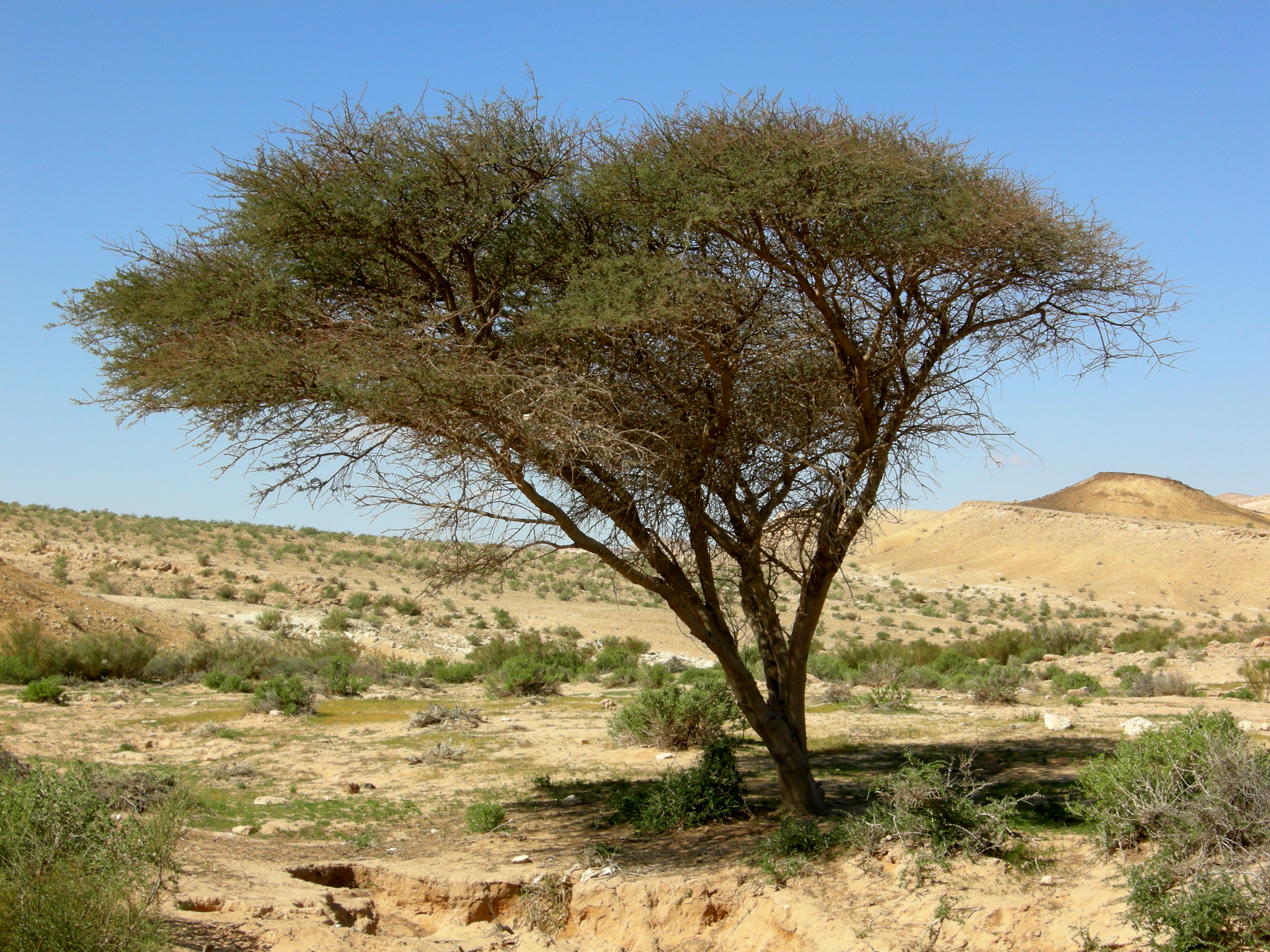
Tlah (Acacia)

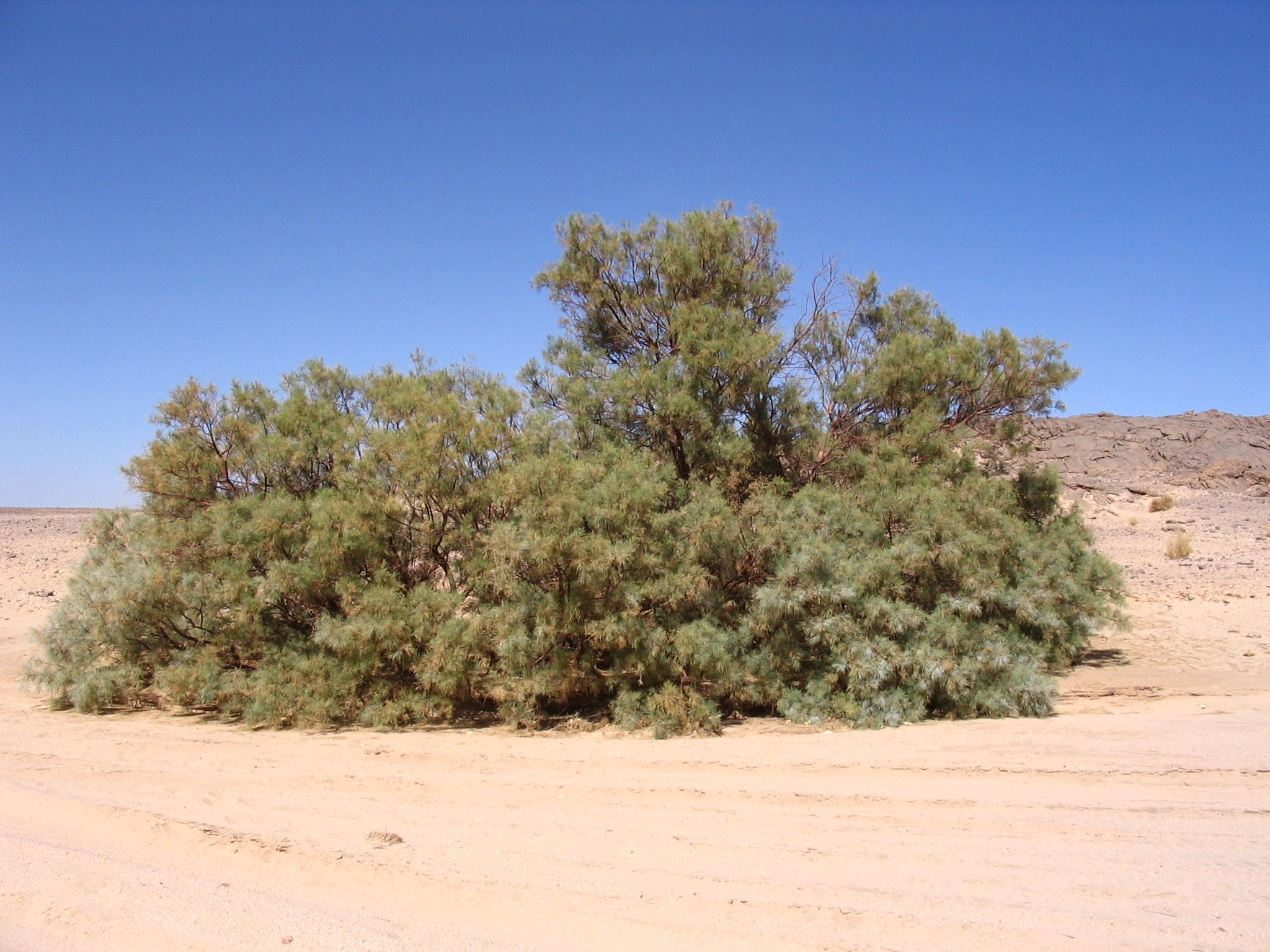
Fnine (Tamarix)

Many species of the Saharan regions' animals are found around Béni Abbès.

The most important mammals are the dorcas gazelle (Gazella dorcas) and rhim gazelle (Gazella leptoceros), both highly threatened by uncontrolled hunting. The sand cat (Felis margarita), striped hyena (Hyaena hyaena) and the fennec fox (Vulpes zerda) are observed in the area only rarely. Rodents found in the area include sand rat (Psammomys obesus), greater Egyptian gerbil (Gerbillus pyramidum) and the Libyan jird (Meriones libycus).

Reptiles in the region include the Sandfish (Scincus scincus) and the dob (Uromastyx).

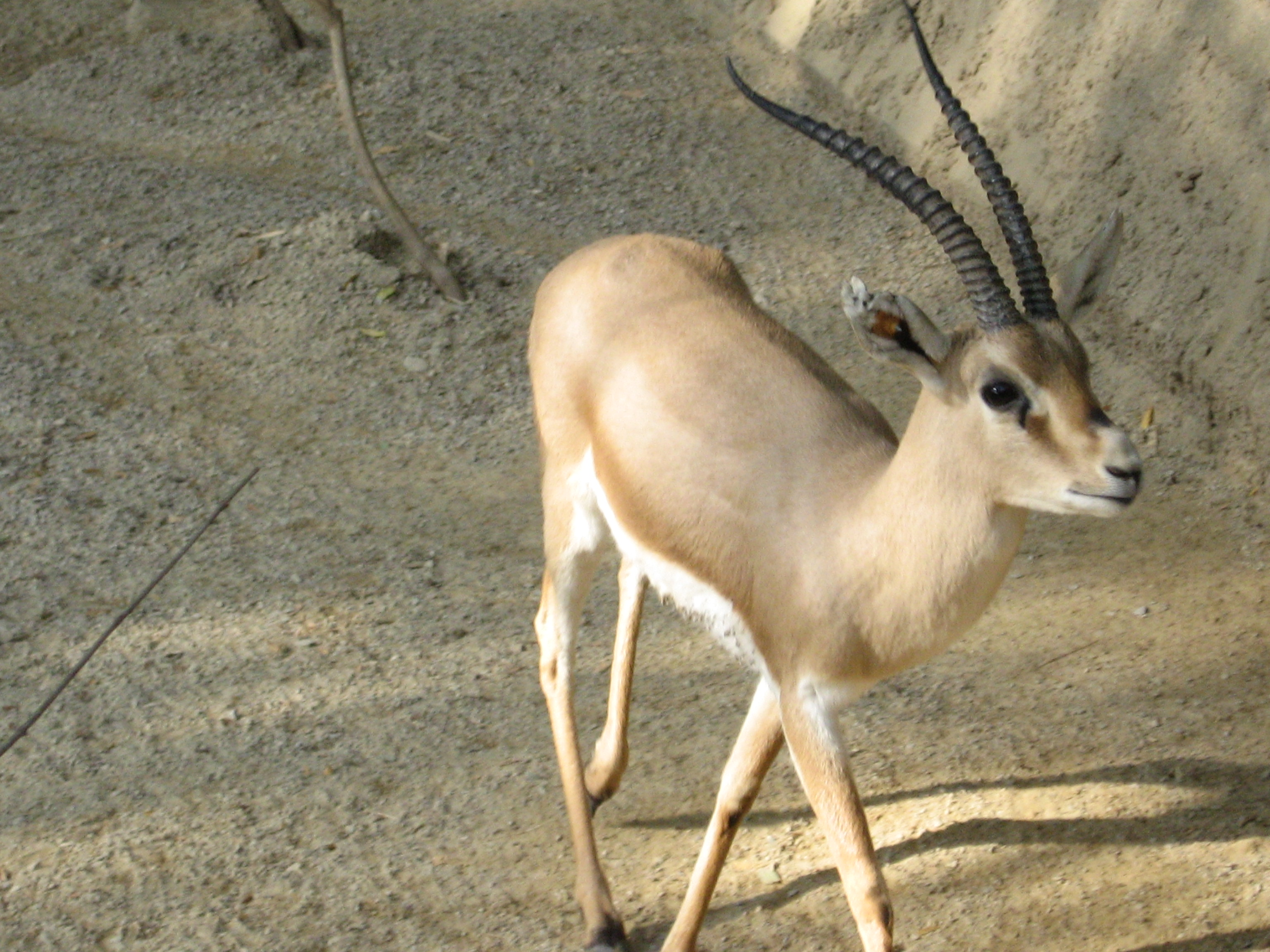
Rhim gazelle (Gazella leptoceros)

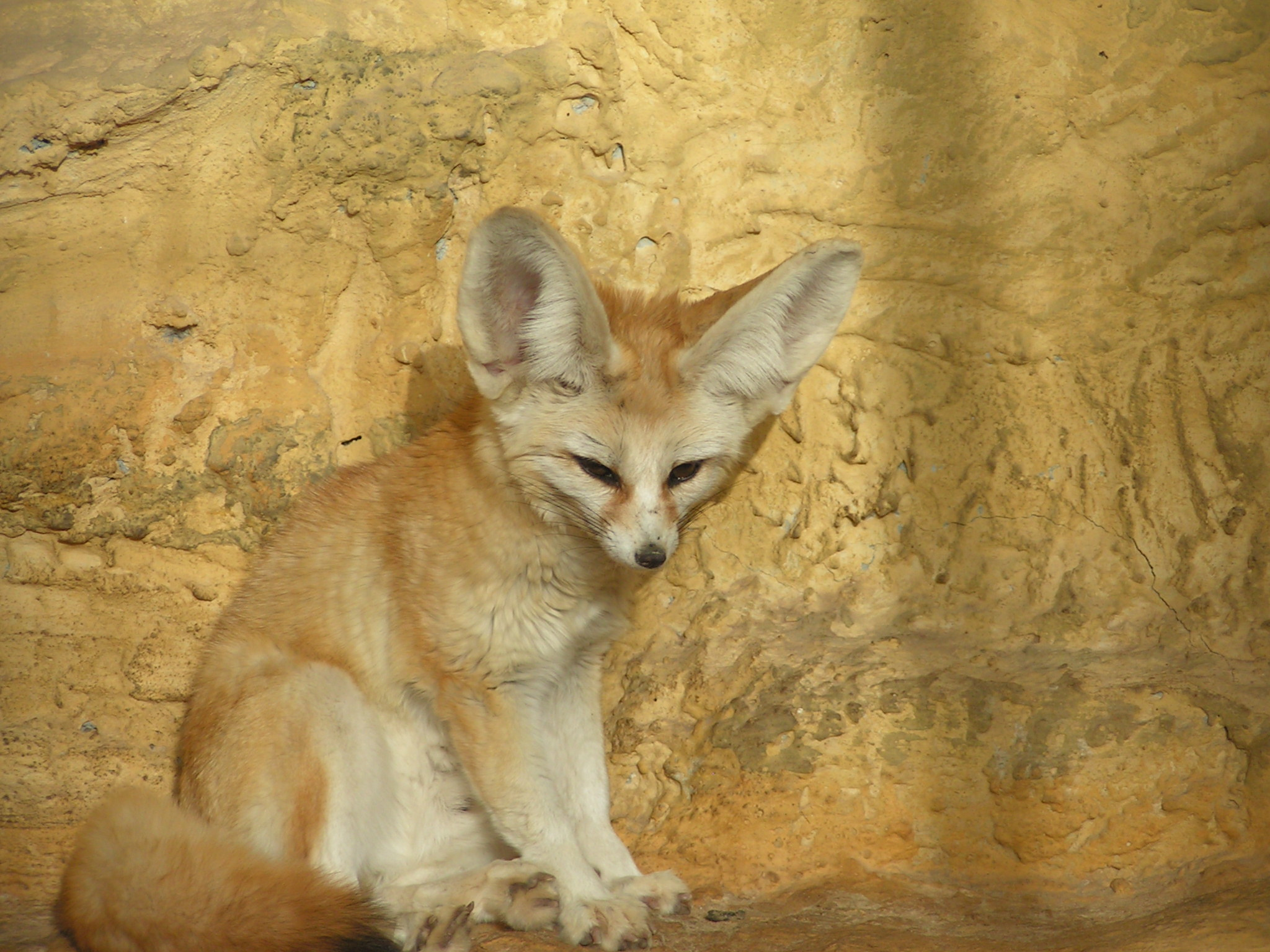
Fennec fox (Vulpes zerda)

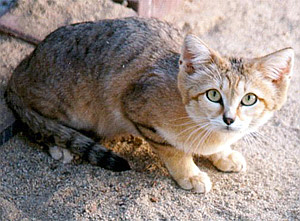
Sand cat (Felis margarita)

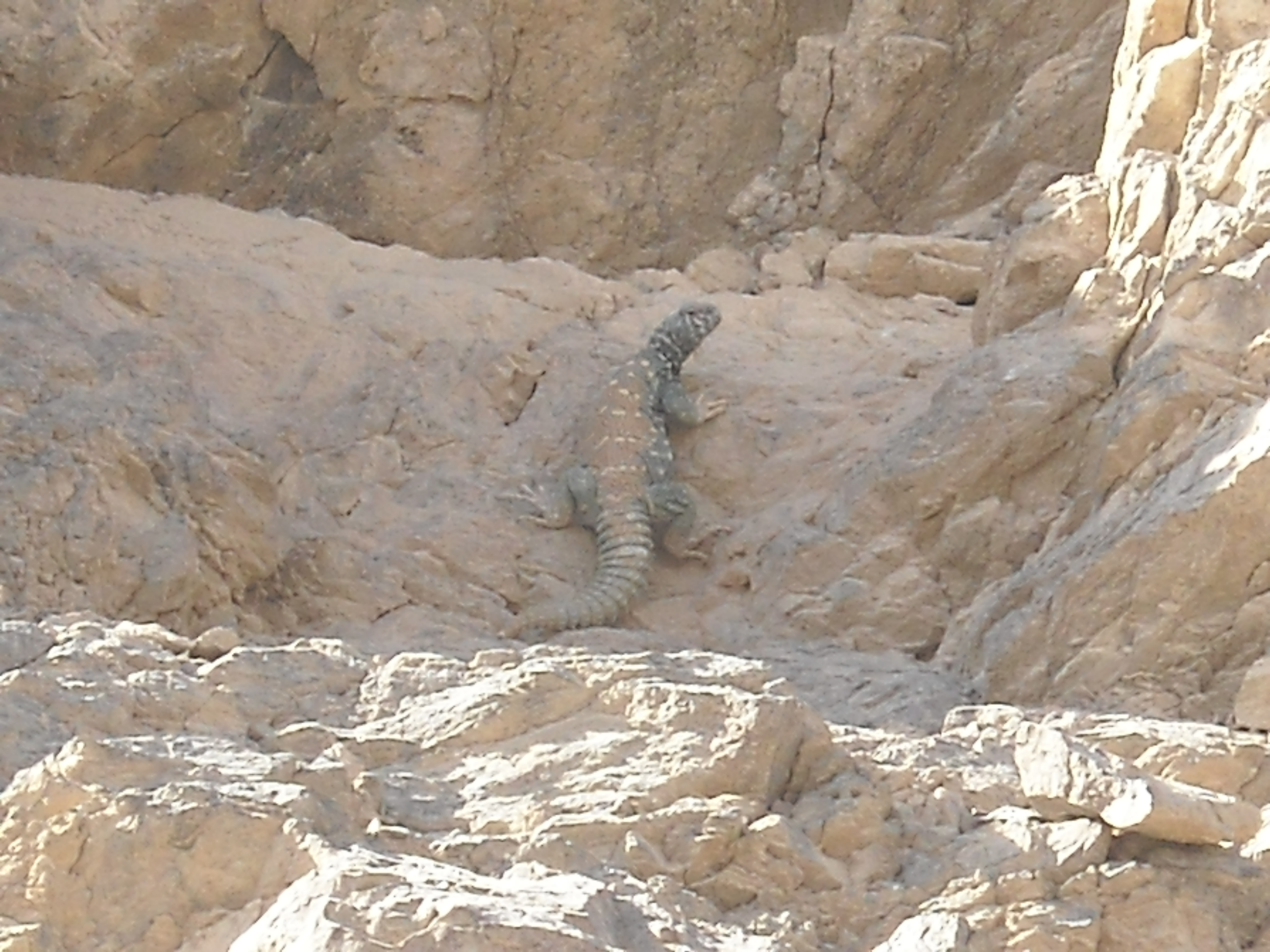
Dob (Uromastyx)

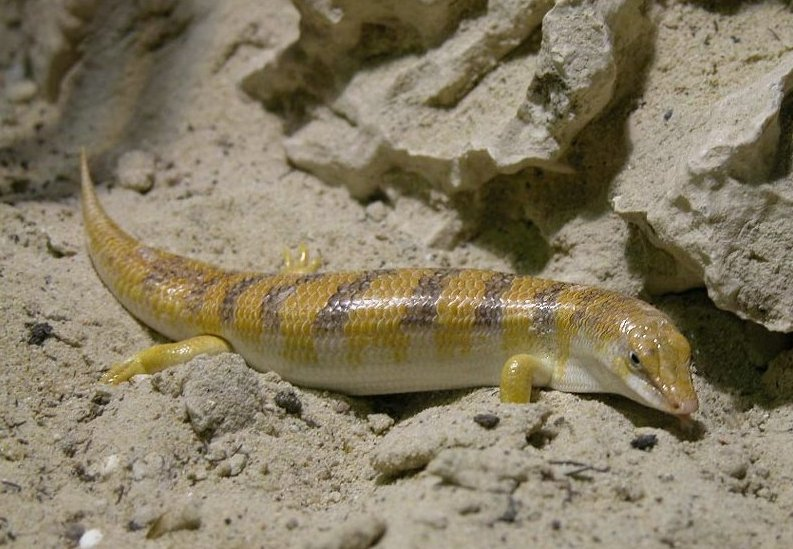
Sandfish (Scincus scincus)

Birds seen around Béni Abbès include bou-ali (house sparrow), bou-tkelem (Spanish sparrow) and raptors such as el-béz (northern goshawk), skàr (lanner falcon) and el-bouma (little owl).

In the recent decades or hundreds of years, the local extinction of many animal species has been reported due to drought and lack of prey, for example, al-naàme (ostrich) and the cheetah (Acinonyx jubatus).

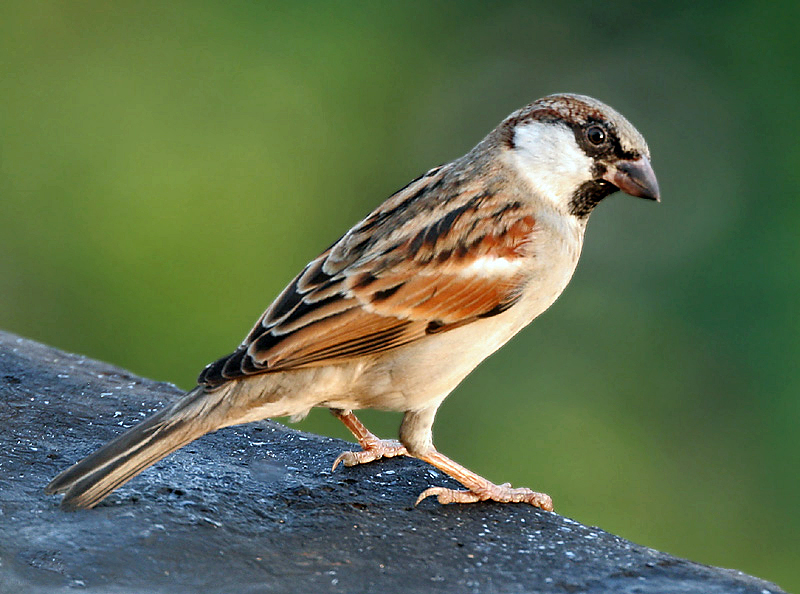
Bou-ali (house sparrow)

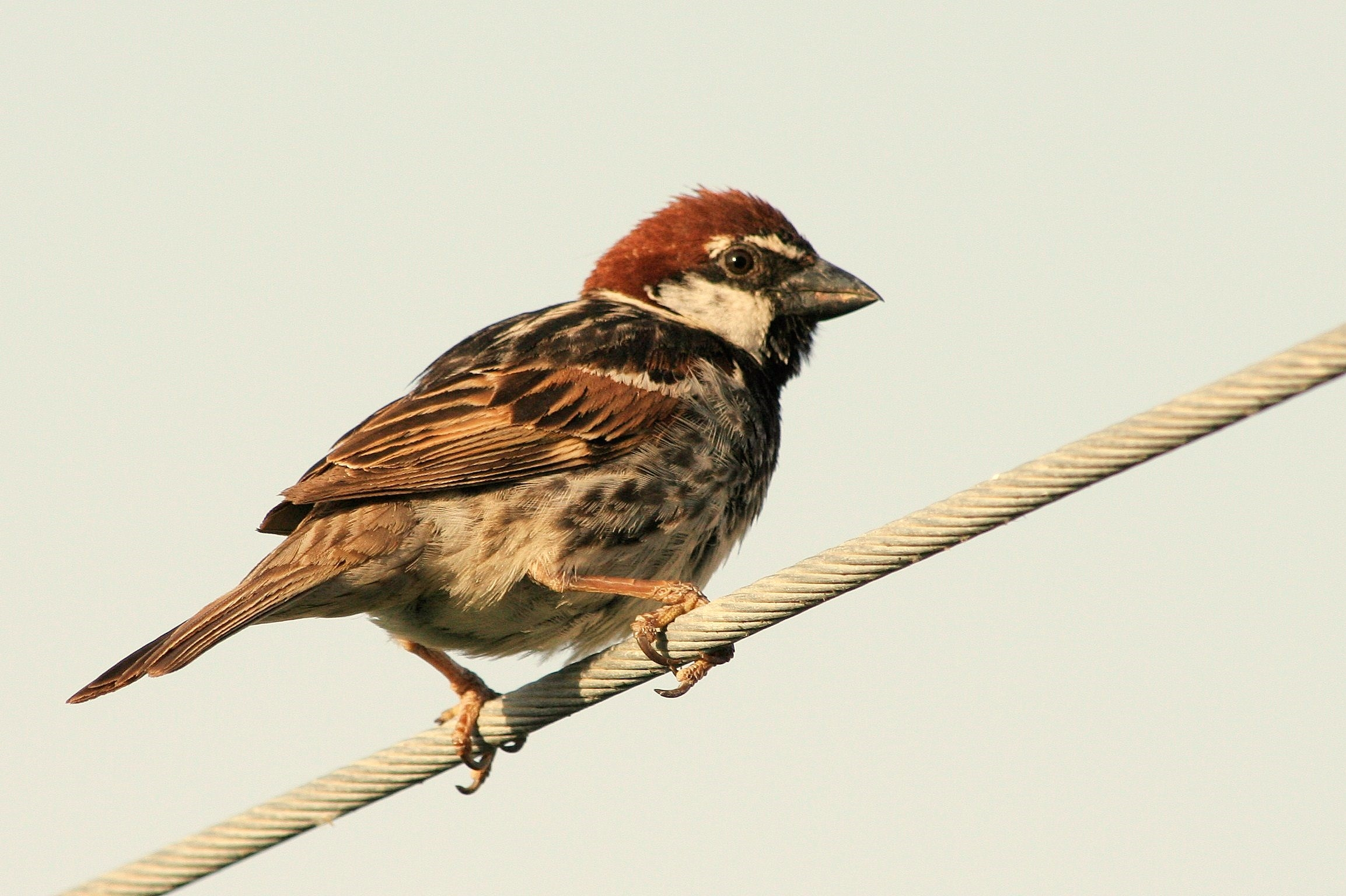
Bou-tkélém (Spanish sparrow)

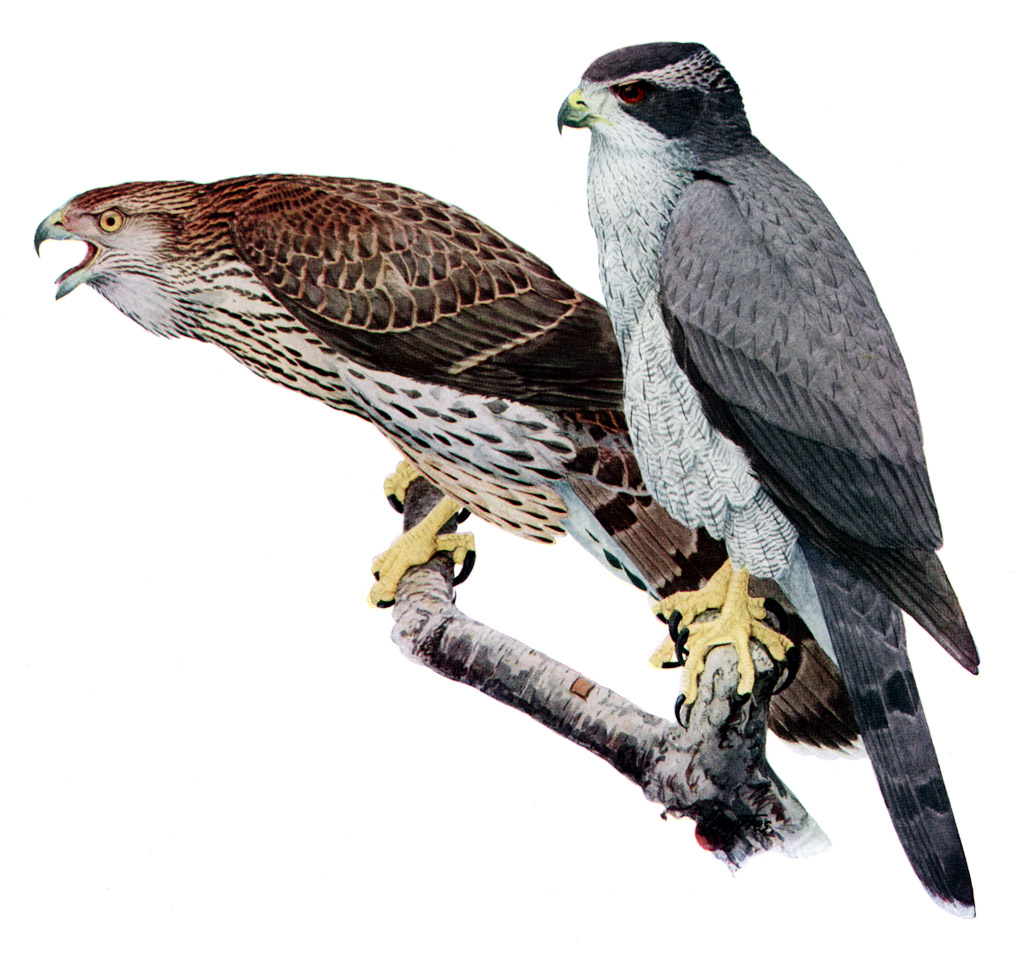
El-béz (northern goshawk)

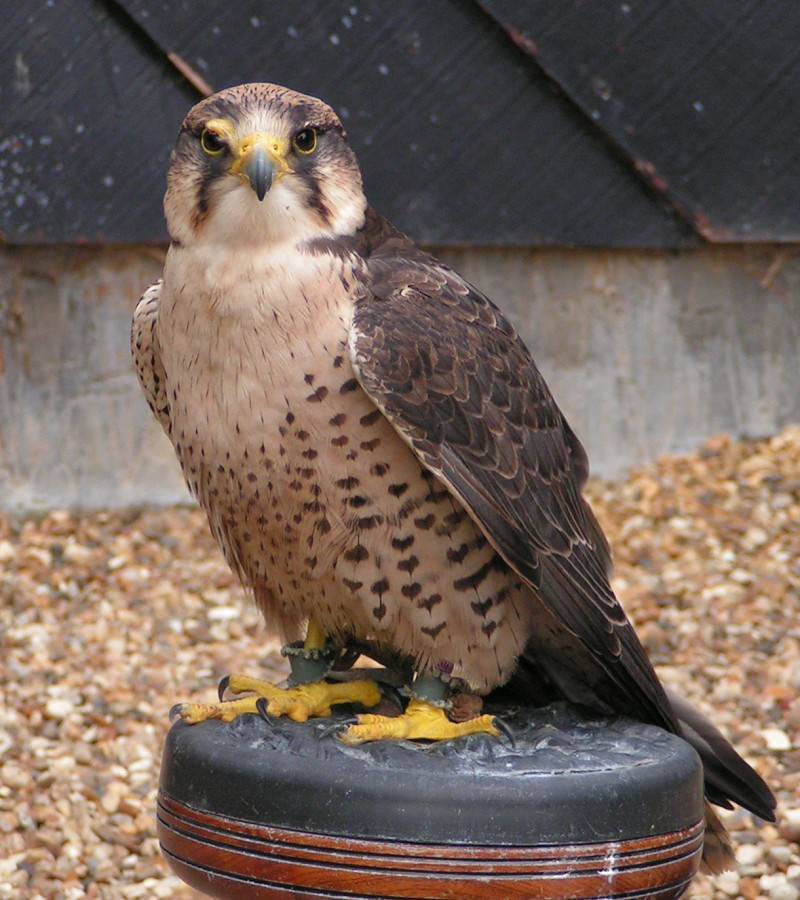
Skàr (lanner falcon)

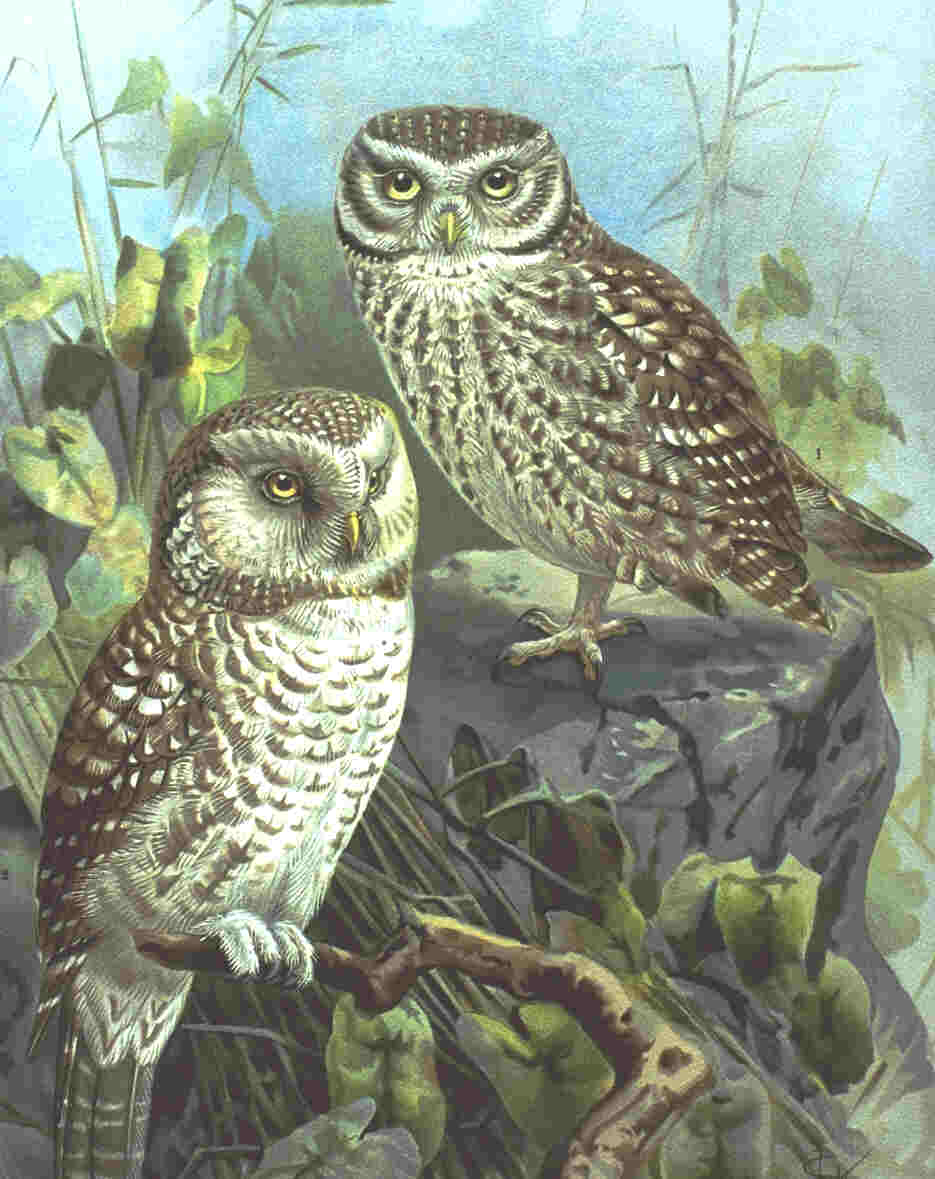
El-bouma (little owl)

Map of French Departments of Algeria (9A~9R) and Departments of Sahara 8A (Oasis) - 8B (Saoura) in 1960.

=== Administrative geography ===
Just after the French occupation of the region and within the territories of South, Béni Abbès became an indigenous municipality in the Territory of Aïn Séfra which existed between 1902 and 1957. In that time, Tindouf was occupied and attached to the indigenous municipality of Béni Abbès until 1935.

In 1957, after replacing the territories of South by the French Departments of Sahara it became a district in the Saoura Department, of which the prefecture was at Colomb-Béchar.

At Algerian independence, Béni Abbès was a district of Saoura Department with Béchar, Adrar, El Abiodh Sidi Cheikh, Timimoun and Tindouf. This arrangement remained until 1974, when the administrative division divided the department into two Provinces: Adrar containing Timimoun District, and Béchar containing El Abiodh Sidi Cheikh, Béni Abbès and Tindouf.

After the new administrative division of 1984 which gave the title of Province to Tindouf and El-Bayadh, Béni Abbès remained a district of Béchar Province. In 2009 it was put on the list of new delegated provinces.

== History ==
=== Prehistory ===
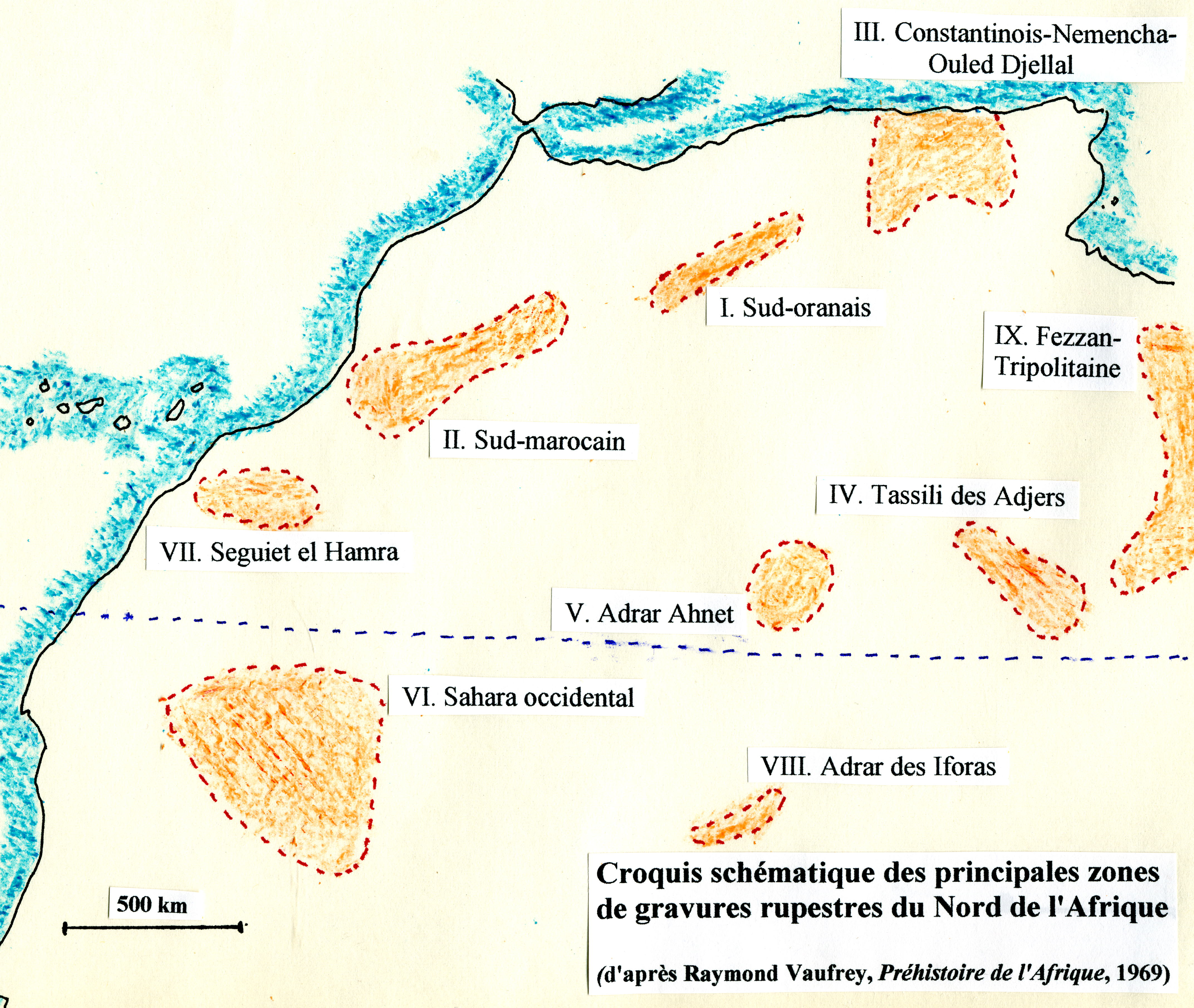
Rock art of South-oranian (Algeria)

The territory of Béni Abbès was inhabited during prehistoric times, as evidenced by the rock carvings of Marhouma.

The petroglyphs of the region date back to Neolithic times. While less famous than the Tassili rock paintings, they have been studied since 1863.

The ideological panel of Marhouma is a remarkably complex scene : "An orant (praying person) on his head a crossed disk and connected to a mammal, surrounded by a wounded animal topped by a young man and a snake man (homme serpentiforme)." In this scene the participants form a closed chain; the prayer of the orant forms links between the hunter and the sacred animal, represented by the snake man and game respectively.

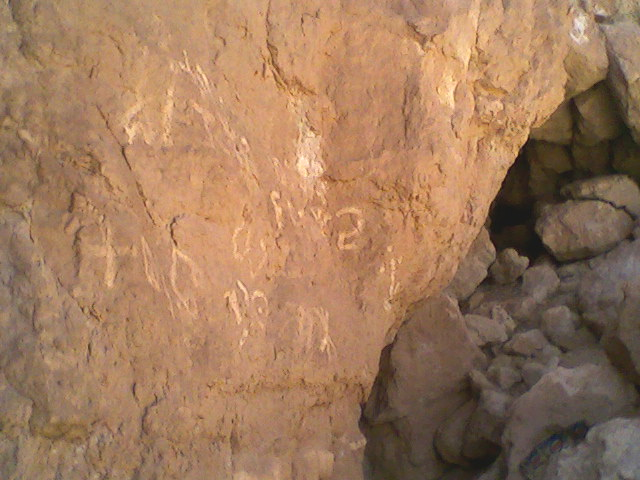
Paleography (Tifinagh) at the entrance of the wolf cave

=== Pre-Islamic period ===
Except for some speculation by historians, there is little information about this period of history of Béni Abbès. Some clues may come from evidence dating from this period, including:

- Paleography at the entrance of Ghar Diba, which means "wolf cave" in Arabic (غار الذيبة).
- Berber names of places, palms, mountains and surrounding ksars date from this period, because it is known that the medieval period in Béni Abbès begins with the arrival of the Arabs.
- the remains of some ksars inhabited by Christianized Berbers.

=== Middle Ages ===
The first Arab settlers in the area were from the Beni Hassan tribe, who built two ksars: Ghar el-Diba and Haresse Lil (translated "night watchman"). They migrated to Saguia el-Hamra and Mauritania in the 12th century.

The history of the founding of the current Béni Abbès begins with the legend of Sidi Othman called "El Gherib" and his companion Sid Enoun. According to the legend, by the blessing of Sidi Othmane, water gushed and flowed from a spring near Béni Abbès; as a result, the country became no longer a desert, the vegetation developed and the valley became full of reeds, trees and pastures.

Forty years after these first migrations, Seguia el-Hamra Mehdi Ben Youssef (descendant of Beniabbes of the Beni Hassan tribe) came to Béni Abbès. He lived with Ali Ben Moumen from the Arib tribe, with whom he brought the palm trees of Draa River. They founded the ksar Oulad Mehdi in which Mehdi Ben Youssef's sons (Said and Youssef) and Ali Ben Moumen's son (Mohamed) lived. The region was peaceful and prosperous through agriculture and trade, bringing a large number of immigrants.

From At-Lamiz in Figuig, two brothers left the ksar towards the east; Ali Ben Yahia and Khalfi bin Abdel-wassàa who settled in Béni Abbès and his brother founded a brotherhood in the Charouine region (Gourara). Ali Ben Yahia was a man with broad experience in agriculture. he founded the ksar Ouled Rahu occupied by Moulay and Ali Ben Yahia's sons.

After a period, Moussa Ben Ali came, probably from Tamentit(although others say from Gourara) to settle at Béni Abbès in the fourteenth century.

In 1593, the Moroccan rebel Abu Mahali settled in Béni Abbès. El Ayachi in his handwritten Arrihla al ayachia 1662 say :"... personage who was placed in a state of open rebellion, sedition which began in this town. Today his house is still known and we watch for travelers".

The continuous development and prosperity of the region brought him many enemies, including Ghenanma. A long period of raids caused the Abbabsa to complain against the Ghenanma to the King of Fes. Soldiers of the Makhzen (Mkhaznia), Fes's ruling elite, left Fes towards Béni Abbès, along the road by Zaouiet Men-Laikhaf in Tafilalt, from where a marabout called Mohamed Ben-Abdeslam joined the troupe.

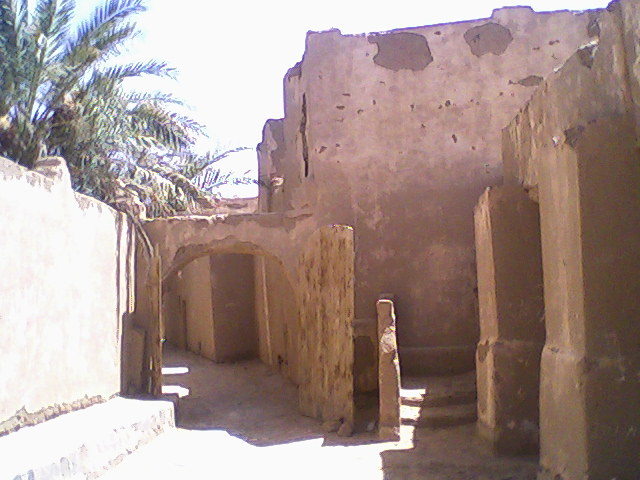
An entrance to the Old Ksar of Beni-Abbes

On arrival at Béni Abbés the Mkhaznia defeated the Ghenanma. The Abbabsa were in a separate ksar and asked Mohamed Ben-Abdeslam to settle with them for Koranic education. He accepted, on the condition that they build a new well fortified ksar in the palm grove. They accepted, and left the choice of location to Ben-Abdeslam.

Mohamed Ben-Abdeslam built the new ksar in the palm grove in 1605 and named it Béni Abbés.

A little later Taleb Belkacem Ben Abdelah arrived in the area from Tmentite.

The descendants of these people, along with the Haratines, make up the population of Béni Abbès. The Ghenanma (Ouled Hamou) lived in an independent ksar.

=== Modern history ===
French occupation

Béni Abbès was occupied by the French on March 1, 1901. General Officer Risbourg visited on March 2 of that year.

The Act of March 30, 1902 stipulated the establishment of five Saharan companies commanded by Affairs Indigenous officers. The Saoura's company in Béni Abbès was strengthened by six officers and 202 non-commissioned officers and Méharistes, including a command platoon and three Méharistes platoons.

In 1904 two Saharan Companies were created; one at Béni Abbès, the other at Colomb-Béchar. These arrangements were for the defense of the Algeria-Morocco border.

Residence of Charles de Foucauld

In October 1901, Charles de Foucauld ("Foucauld Father") settled in Béni Abbès. With the help of the soldiers present in the town he built a "Khaoua" (fraternity), (Note: p. 172) composed of a room, a chapel and three acres of garden, (Note: p. 174) purchased with the help of Marie de Bondy. The chapel was completed on December 1, 1901. His life was intended to revolve around a strict rule: five hours of sleep, six hours of manual work interspersed with a long time of prayer. (Note: p. 249) However, it was quickly overwhelmed by the long time taken to listen to the poor and the soldiers who come to see him. (Note: p. 173) (Note: p. 251) He described to Gabriel Tourdes:

living work of my hands, and unknown to all the poor and enjoy the deep darkness, silence, poverty, in imitation of Jesus. Imitation is inseparable from love. Whoever wants to imitate love is the secret of my life. Priest since last June, I immediately felt called to go to the lost sheep, to the most abandoned souls, to perform towards them the duty of love. I am happy, very happy, although I do not in any way seek happiness.

Béchar province, in which lies Béni Abbès

On January 9, 1902, he bought the freedom of a slave, whom he called Joseph du Sacré-Cœur (Joseph of the Sacred Heart). A portion of the year 1902 was devoted to an exchange of correspondence with Bishop Guerin, the Apostolic prefect of Sahara, about his fight against slavery in the Hoggar. The following year, he planned for trips to Morocco to establish a fraternity. He would be joined by companions of whom he would ask three things : "be prepared to have his head cut off—be prepared to starve—to obey him despite his unworthiness".

On May 27, 1903, Charles de Foucauld was visited by Bishop Guerin. (Note: p. 186) Charles was looking for a companion for evangelism and asked to go south to prepare for it. (Note: p. 191) The commander François-Henry Laperrine was interested in the presence of Charles de Foucauld and tried to get him on his tour of supply to the south. (Note: p. 196) (Note: p. 193) Charles showed himself even more favorable than François-Henry Laperrine, who seemed to use methods much less violent than its predecessors. (Note: p. 195) On June 18, 1903, Charles asked Bishop Guerin for permission to accompany Laperrine, but the rebellion of the tribes against the colonial presence made this approach impossible. Learning of this conflict, however, Charles left to the south on September 2, 1903, in order to rescue the wounded from the Battle of Taghit and El-Moungar. (Note: p. 199) He came back and wrote a short introduction to the catechism which he entitled The Gospel presented to the poor negroes of the Sahara. Sometime later, François-Henry Laperrine asked Charles to come with him during the upcoming tour of supply in the South. Abbe Henri Huvelin wrote to him advising "go where you shoot the Spirit". (Note: p. 198)

Charles toured with supply January 13, 1904, on the air south toward the Hoggar. (Note: p. 273) On February 1, 1904, he and his companions arrived at Adrar oasis where they joined the commander Laperrine. (Note: p. 218) From there, the tour continued towards Akabli. Charles then noted all the possible places of installation. He collected information on Tuareg languages from the people of the central south Sahara (Note: p. 204) and there began the translation of the Gospels in order to transmit it to the Tuaregs. (Note: p. 278)

He was disappointed by the attitude of some military Colonials. (Note: p. 274) (Note: p. 277) Arriving near the Algerian border, the tour of supply had to turn around and travel to Tit. (Note: p. 203) Charles wanted to settle in there but the commander Laperrine refused. The tour ended at In Salah in September. Charles joined Bishop Guerin on September 22, 1904, and returned to Béni Abbès on 24 January 1905. (Note: p. 205)

Intrigued by Charles de Foucauld, General Hubert Lyautey, appointed in Algeria, decided to visit him at Béni Abbès on January 28, 1905. (Note: p. 208) From this meeting came a reciprocal friendship (Note: p. 222) and a certain admiration of Lyautey for Charles. (Note: p. 283) During this period Charles wrote the Meditations on the Holy Gospels. In April 1905, Commander Laperrine requested Charles de Foucauld to leave with him on a tour in the Hoggar. Having sought advice from Huvelin and Bishop Guerin, he participated in a new tour of supply. (Note: p. 224) (Note: p. 210) He started on June 8, 1905, continuing his prayer life while learning Tamahaq. On 25 Juin, 1905, they met amenokal (chef of the tribe) Moussa Ag Amastan, who decided to make an alliance with the French authority. (Note: p. 287 et 212) Charles de Foucauld and Moussa Ag Amastan met and seemed to appreciate each other. Their meeting developed into a deep friendship. (Note: p. 226) The Touareg authorized Charles de Foucauld to settle in the Hoggar, (Note: p. 213) near Tamanrasset. (Note: p. 215)

National liberation movement

In the Saoura region, Béni Abbès has always been an important focus of the nationalist movement. In 1921, Saadoune (born in Béni Abbès) emigrated to France where he militates to Étoile Nord-Africaine (ENA) and was then designated as a member committee central of the part in 02/07/1926.

Since the 1930s, Béni Abbès has been the exile place of several political and historical Algerian figures such as Ferhat Abbas, Mohammed Memchaoui, Sheikh Abdelkader El Yadjouri and Sheikh Sliman Boudjnah.

In late 1947, Sheikh Touhami, an MTLD activist came from Béchar to Béni Abbès to found an office for his political party. The Abbabsa, who have already attended the exiled persons to their homes, did not hesitate to join the movement. The Bureau consisted of four people, Touhami Tayeb, Trabelsi Boufeldja, Abdellah Ben-cheikh and Benali Abderrahman, and remained in service until 1954, when the majority of activists transferred to the FLN. The Abbabsa participated in the war of National Liberation between 1954 and 1962.

On November 11, 1955, the French discovered the names of those involved in the struggle, and transferred the members imprisoned at Béni Abbès to Béchar, or Serkadji prison if they had been tried. After the members' release, they continued the fight with Trabelsi Boufeldja who escaped detention and Mohammed Yacoub's writer Taleb-Zian.

After France applied the policy of concentration camps at Béni Abbès and terror politics applied to some ksars, a mujahid (Chikimi Mebrok) exploded a bomb in the middle of a group of French soldiers as retaliation for France's actions in the region. He was arrested and executed a few minutes after.

Consequently, the regional recruits in the French army fled to join the ALN into two groups; the first group, led by Alla Ben-Lhachemi, managed to escape with possession of a quantity of arms and ammunition, the second group, led by Sellam Ali, was arrested in Béchar.

The National Liberation Army's military base of Hassi Ali was re-organized under the leadership of Alhadj chebir who fled in turn of the French army.

In October 1957, the inhabitants of ksar of the palm in Béni Abbès were expelled by the French troops because of the activities of the Mujahideen, and needed to build a new ksar.

After 1960, Béni Abbès witnessed several visits of Mohamed Chérif Messaadia, wherein he and other officers under the command of Abdelaziz Bouteflika, a group referred to as Si Abdelkader El Mali, discussed opening the front in Mali, organizing military operations against French interests, and fighting against the French strategy of secession of the Sahara from the rest of Algeria.

Members of the ALN in the region participated in various battles against the French troops, sacrificing their lives for freedom. Among the Shahids (martyrs) were Mazozi Cheick, Touhami Tayeb, Belghit Hmida, and Hamdi Ahmed.

Scientific movement

The Franco-Russian geologist Nicolas Menchikoff (About 1900 - 1992) began his research in the region during the 1920s. In 1942 the SRC (Saharan Research Center) was created in Béni Abbèshe, and Menchikoff was appointed director for several years.

In 1946, together with the general government of Algeria, the BRP (Bureau de recherche de pétrole) created the Société Nationale de Recherche et d'Exploitation de Pétrole en Algérie (SN REPAL) headquartered in Hydra in Algiers. Geological research began in 1948, in association with CFP (French Petroleum Company) in the region of Béni Abbès, Timimoun and In Salah, but without any positive results.

In 1972, the management of Saharan research center founded by the CNRS (Current National Center for Research on Arid Zones) was transferred to the Algerian authorities and has since depended on the University of Science and Technology, Houari Boumediene (Bab Ezzouar, Algiers).

After independence

On, July 5, 1962, the day of the declaration of Algerian Independence, the Algerian flag was raised at Béni Abbès while preserving the French forces in the city, respecting the Ceasefire according to the Évian Accords. A delegation of Mujahideen was founded in Béni Abbès with Alla Ben Lhachemi as political leader and military officials.

Between 1961 and 1965, the Organization Saharan scored his action in line with that of the Common Organisation of Saharan Regions (OCRS) and built 1,000 kilometres (620 mi) of additional roads, including the following segments: Béni Abbès – Adrar, Touggourt – El-Oued, and In-Amenas – El-Adeb.

In October 1962, the 2nd Foreign Infantry Regiment was installed at Colomb-Béchar and took command of the military sites in the Sahara: the (nuclear test sites and the Hammaguir space facilities.

The political management of the city was Algerian and the first mayor appointed was Ben Said Mokhtar, who remained in place until 1967, the date of the first elections of the Communal People's Assemblies.

In 1963 Béni Abbès's Patrol Leader (CP) and Tabelbala's CP were created from the Colomb-Béchar Regiment. In 1967 France evacuated four military French facilities that had remained active in the Sahara after independence, but not B2-Namous, a site in the Sahara where France tested chemical weapons, including the extremely toxic nerve agent Tabun. Following this action the company of Béni Abbès was removed too.

Until 1971 the city was governed by Mohamed Maamar locally called Ba Maamar because of his humility and closeness to the people.

From 1976 to 1981 the town was under the governance of Guesmia Boudjemmâa known as El-Montassir (Died June 8, 2009). The city saw the construction of a bridge at the entrance of the city, and the commissioning of antennas for receiving television programs.

== Architecture and urban planning ==
=== Housing and infrastructure ===
Béni Abbès has a total of 2,392 houses, of which 1,716 are occupied, giving an occupation rate of 6.3 inhabitants per occupied building. 90% of Béni Abbès's population are connected to drinking water, and 90% are also connected to the sewerage system.

=== Cityscape ===
Historic neighborhoods (Safat, Tlayat, Souiguiat) combine Islamic and local architecture. The hill with its buildings and its front Oued is representative of French and modern architecture.

The district seat and Citroen home overlooking the cliff are the representative type of French architecture of the colonial era. The seat of the Saharan Research Center, the old infirmary, and the colonists' neighborhood (called Karté) also feature this architectural type.

Historic neighborhoods retain the old underlying architecture, even if the surface of dwellings has changed, construction method and building materials either remain almost the same as previously, or incorporate new materials such as Cement and cement brick. The oldest mosque in the new town is in Safat neighbourhood which dates from 1957 (the Mosque of Ksar, 1605).

A nearby neighborhood of Souiguiat, was built by and inhabited by Jews from the beginning of the twentieth century to the dawn of the independence of Algeria. These Jews brought back by the French authorities' decree of October 24, 1870 which gave French citizenship to 37,000 Algerian Jews.

=== Religious buildings ===
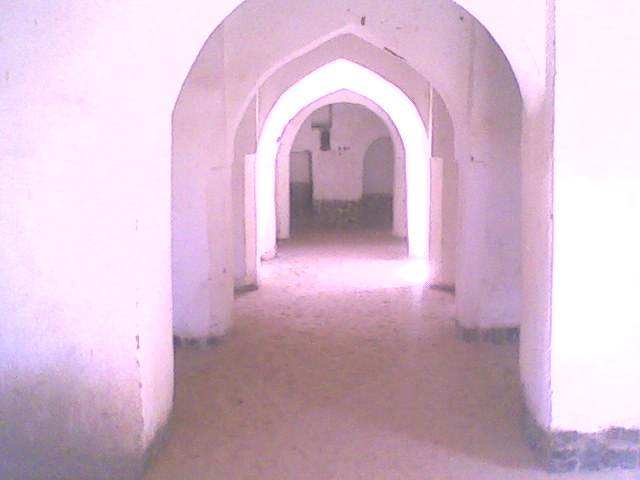
The old Ksar's Mosque (1605)

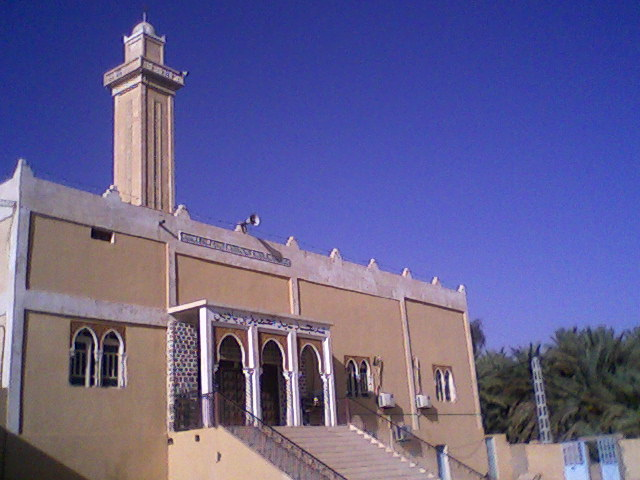
Ibn Badis' Mosque (about 1990)

The harmony of religions has long been the norm in Béni Abbès, and various places of worship are found in the town. There are religious buildings of both Islam and Christianity.

The oldest religious building is the Old Ksar's mosque, which dates back to the beginning of the seventeenth century (1605), followed the chapel of Father Charles de Foucauld (1901). All other religious buildings are mosques or Koranic schools Founded after the abandonment of Old Ksar in 1957. There are 5 operational mosques, with another 3 under construction.

=== Patron saints and mausoleums ===
In Béni Abbès there are dozens of tombs of saints, but only two have a mausoleum.

There are two patron saints for all Abbabsa:

- Sidi Othman called El Ghrib: came from Egypt, founder of Béni Abbès and creator of its source according to oral tradition. His grave is in the cemetery that bears his name.
- Sidi Mohammed Ben-Abdeslam : unified the tribes and founded the ksar of the palm grove. His tomb is in the mosque of Old Ksar.

The two mausoleums existing at Béni Abbès are dedicated to:

- Sidi El Hadj Mhamed Ben Ahmed : patron saint of Ouled Ali Ben Moussa; the mausoleum is at the entrance to the city on the right bank of Oued Saoura, in an old cemetery.
- Sidi Mohamed Ben Abbou : patron saint of Oulad Mehdi; the mausoleum is in the cemetery and on the Shelf that bear his name.

The rest are tribal saints:

- Sidi Othman dite El Ghrib (all Abbabsa)
- Sidi Mohamed Ben Abbou or Sidi Mohamed Ben Abdellah (Oulad Mehdi)
- Sidi Ali Ben Yahia (Oulad Rahou)
- Sidi Mohammed ben abdeslam (Mrabtine)
- Sidi El Hadj Mhamed Ben Ahmed (Oulad Ali Ben Moussa)
- Sidi Radouan (Beni hassan)
- Sidi Djebor (Ghenanma)
- Sidi Said
- Sidi Abdelkader al-Jilani (all Abbabsa)

=== Cemeteries ===
The Sidi Othman Cemetery is a common name for two cemeteries at the same time, it refers to both the burial place of the current city, and the burial place of the saint Sidi Othman el-Gharib, which is considered the oldest burial site in the city (there is no information available about the burial places of the Beni Hassan).

There are several old cemeteries dating from the time prior to the founding of the Old Ksar: Sidi Mohamed Ben Abbou Cemetery, Sidi Ali Ben Yahia Cemetery, and Sidi El Hadj Mhamed Ben Ahmed Cemetery.

Béni Abbès has cemeteries for the burial of people of different abrahamic religions, a Christian cemetery on the plateau (near the current clinic) and on the other side of the Charles de Foucauld chapel in addition to a cemetery for the burial of Jews.

There is also a brand new cemetery dedicated to martyrs of the war of National Liberation, at the entrance to the city on the left side of the road.

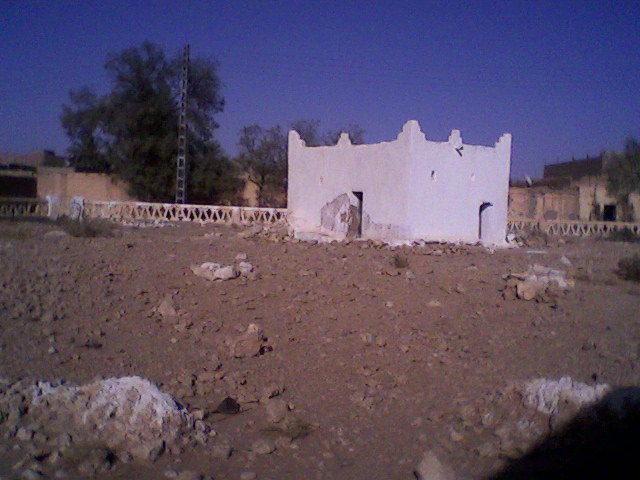
Sidi Mohamed Ben Abbou Cemetery

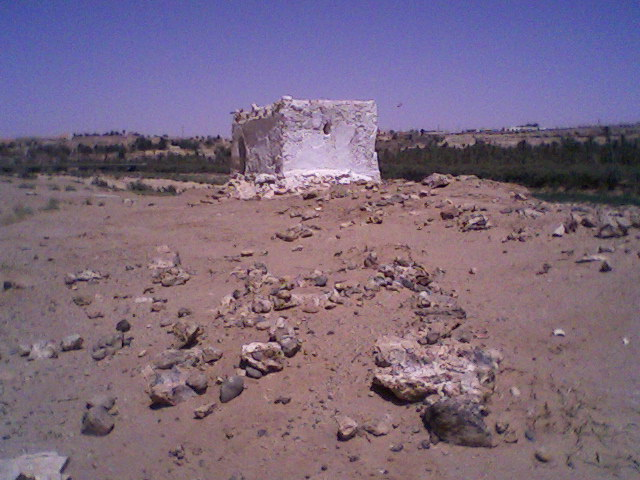
Sidi El Hadj Mhamed Ben Ahmed Cemetery

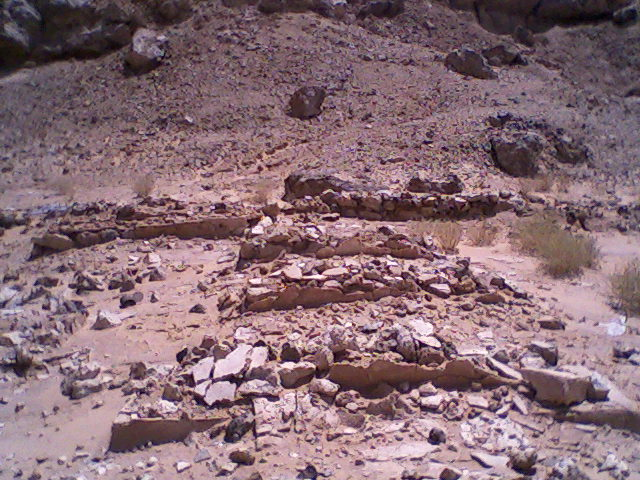
Jews' Cemetery (20th Century)

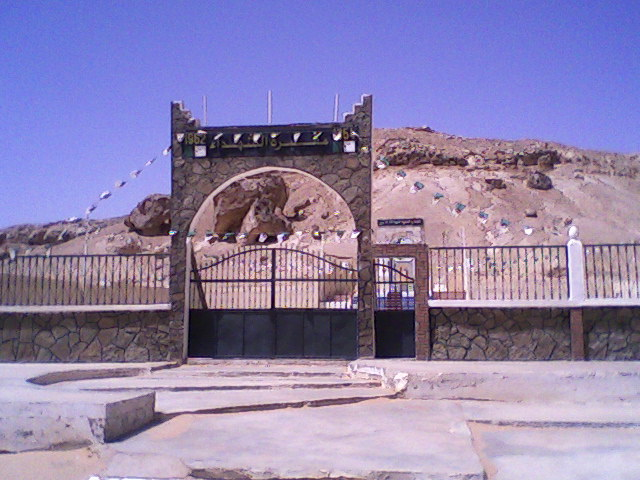
Martyrs' Cemetery

== Culture ==
=== Museums ===
Béni Abbès Museum is located in the Saharan Research Center. It was created because of the richness of this region, containing important treasures in a radius of 50 kilometres (31 mi) with different geological structures, flora and fauna. It contains seven sections focusing on Béni Abbès and its region: prehistory, old Béni Abbès, natural history, archaeology, entomology, flora and fauna.

=== Music ===
Traditional songs of Béni Abbès such as El Maya and El Hadra accompanied by percussion instruments called Tara and Kallal, singing local Arabic poetry and folklore in different rhythms.

- El Maya: a symbol of the folklore of the Abbabsa, played by a group of singers and drummers, similar to the Ghazal and Madih nabawi genres of folk songs.
- El Hadra: a strict traditional Madih nabawi for Muhammad and Ahl al-Bayt (people of the clan).

=== Festivals and Events ===
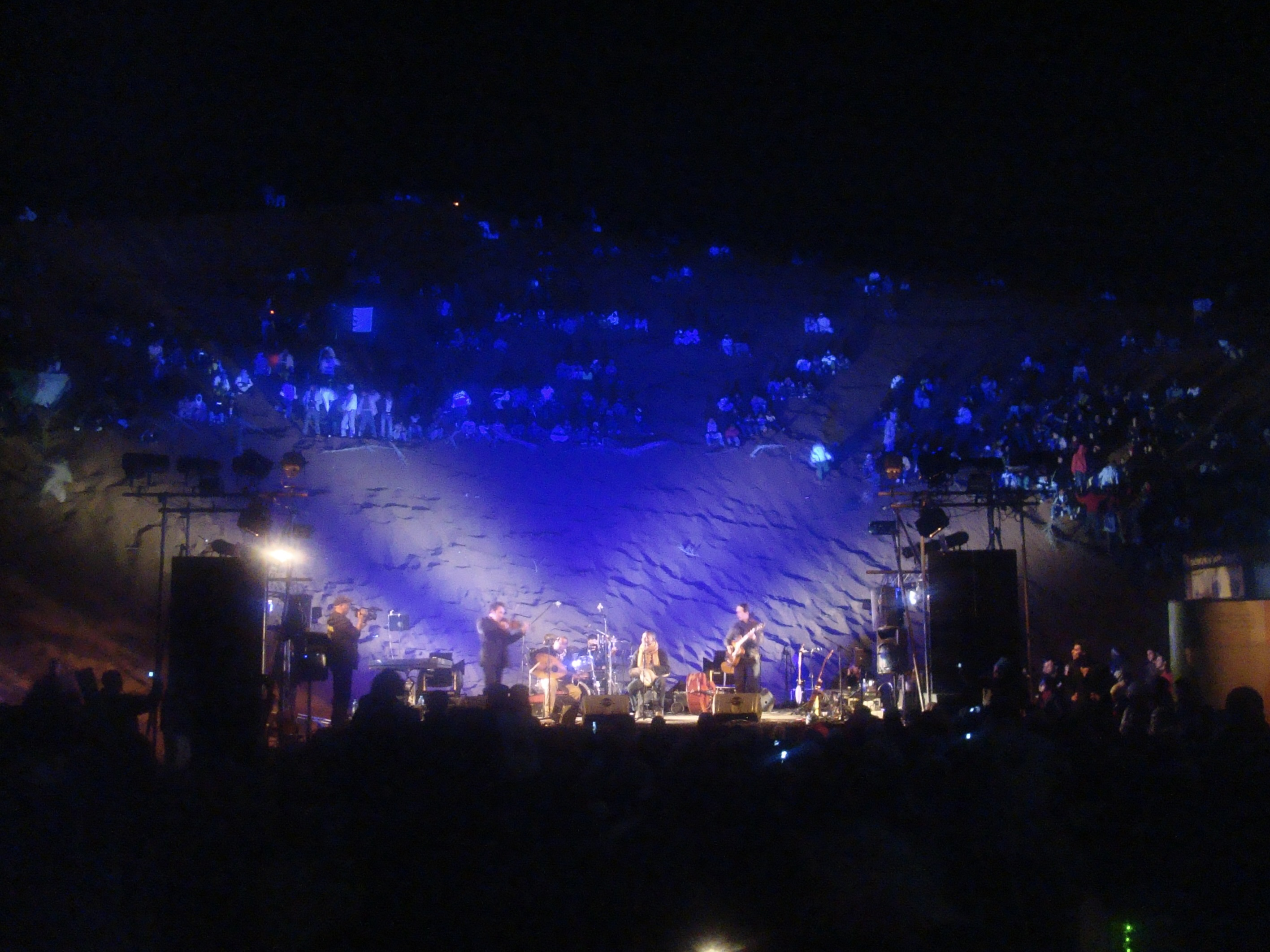
An evening of nights Saoura's in dunes

For a long time, Béni Abbès has been the venue for several cultural events:

- In the year 1920, Citroën organised a car rally hosted by Béni Abbès.
- During the 1930s, art exhibitions were featured, including the galleries of the artist André Hébuterne in 1933 and 1934.
- In 1990, a part of the film The Sheltering Sky by Italian filmmaker Bernardo Bertolucci was filmed in Béni Abbès.
- In 2005, Béni Abbès host of the circus band Cambodian International Lighthouse Ponleu Selpak.
- In 2007, Béni Abbès hosted the 8th edition of the Marathon of the dunes.
- From 19 to 21 April 2009, the jubilee of the geologist Professor Jean Fabre was commemorated in Béni Abbès.
- In 2010, Béni Abbès was the site of filming a part of the television series Djouha of the artist Hakim Dekkar.

The Festival Les Nuits de la Saoura is an international annual festival of music in Béni Abbès, the result of a cooperation between both Algerian association Hillal Saoura and French Nuits Métis. The first event took place in December 2003/January 2004.

=== Annual feast ===
Each year at Béni Abbès the Mouloud feast (for the birth of Muhammad) is held. This is an opportunity for the presentation of those born in the past year, and a grand parade with music and old rifles, commemorating peace between the tribes and the creation of the ksar of the palm grove.

The Abbabsa, like all Muslims, use the Lunar calendar to determine the dates of special local and religious events but also give each month a special appellation as shown below.

months in Arabic	local name (m)
Muharram (Arabic: محرم)	Achour (عاشور)
Safar (Arabic: صفر)	Tabea ʻĀshwr (تابع عاشور)
Rabi' al-awwal (Arabic: ربيع الأول)	El-Mouloud (المولود)
Rabi' al-thani (Arabic: ربيع الثاني)	Tab'eo lawel (تابعو لول)
Jumada al-awwal (Arabic: جمادى الأول)	Tab'eo jawége (تابعو الجاوج)
Jumada al-Thani (Arabic: جمادى الثاني)	...
Rajab (Arabic: رجب)	ch-har al-Lah (شهر الله)
Sha'aban (Arabic: شعبان)	Chaabane (شعبان)
Ramadan (Arabic: رمضان)	Remdan (رمضان)
Shawwal (Arabic: شوال)	El-Aïd Sghir (العيد الصغير)
Dhu al-Qi'dah (Arabic: ذو القعدة)	Bin-Laïad (بين لعياد)
Dhu al-Hijjah (Arabic: ذو الحجة)	El-Aïd al-Kbīr (العيد لكبير)

=== Cinemas ===
There is one cinema in Béni Abbès.

== Health ==
Béni Abbès has a hospital named Mohammed Yaakoub (one of only four in the province), one polyclinic, one room care facility, a maternity ward, 4 private pharmacies, and a medical operating theater.

== Education and research centers ==
The educational system in Béni Abbès has 8 elementary schools, two middle schools, one secondary school, a vocational training center, and paramedic training classes. However, there are no higher educational institutions in the town.

7.3% of the population has a tertiary education, and another 24.0% has competed secondary education. The overall literacy rate is 86.0%, and is 91.6% among males (the second highest in the province) and 80.4% among females.

The National Center for Research on Arid Zones (Béni Abbès station) is the only research station in Béni Abbès; it houses a museum (collections of local ethnography, geology, prehistory, and zoology), a zoo (very few animals are still present but among them is a great tortoise), a botanical garden and a biological research laboratory.

== Abbassian Cuisine ==
The Abbassian cuisine in Béni Abbès is a rich mix of different cultures; it is strongly influenced by Moroccan culinary traditions, and is also rich in local specificities, marked by very varied traditional dishes including:

- Khobz Lebsal (Arabic: خبز البصل) "Onion bread": is an unleavened bread based with onion, after preparation of the paw of a mixture of water and flour, filled the dough with the sauce prepared with onion, tomato, chili pepper (optional) and oil (preferably olive oil).
- ṭaʿām (Arabic: طعام) "Couscous": a popular dish in many countries, but it has a special method of preparation in Béni Abbès. This is what is made as the first dish of hospitality for a guest.
- Erkkik (Arabic: الرقيق): dough sheets are prepared in using a special tray called a tadjine (Arabic: طاجين)), and left to dry for a while. Leaves cut into pieces are put in a plate with wells that wet it with a specially prepared sauce.

== Associations ==
The creation of associations in Béni Abbès began with the Act of December 4, 1990. They have successfully engaged in the fields of exchange, youth camps and Volunteer projects such as ADESF and Ouarourout Association, environmental protection, maintenance and renewal of cultural heritage, including music (El-Maya Association, Hillal Saoura), promotion of handicrafts, sand skiing, camel racing organization (El-Khayma Association).

== Economy ==
=== Sectors of activity ===
==== Tourism ====
Tourism is the most prospective economic sector for development. There are two hotels in Béni Abbès for tourists, including one rated three stars. Béni Abbès has the potential for several types of development:

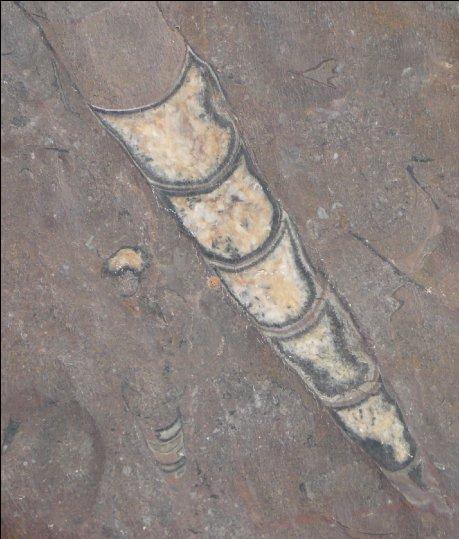
Carboniferous Great Wall of China (Orthoceras)

- Saharan: There are camel rides, visits to the Grand Erg Occidental and many opportunities for excursions and walks.
- Religious: Mouloud Day, celebrating the birth of Muhammad.
- Cultural: music festivals and other cultural events.
- Scientific: researchers and others who visite the NCRAZ.
- Voluntary: Volunteer projects and rehabilitation of sites.

Significant attractions include:

- The ksars: Béni Abbès includes seven ksars, some of which are still inhabited. These include the ksar placed at the heart of the palm grove; it has been uninhabited since 1957 and is currently being restored, and is classified as a building of national architectural heritage.
- The palm grove is shaped in the form of a scorpion, whose tail is dominated by a large red sand dune (the highest of the Grand Erg Occidental).
- A swimming pool fed by a spring of pure water coming out at 24 degrees (warm in winter, cool in summer).
- Carboniferous Great Wall of China: 30 kilometres (19 mi) from Beni Abbes, on the left side of the road to El Ouata is a deposit of Orthoceras fossils.

==== Industry ====
Currently, apart from the power station which has a capacity of 4 × 5 MW TG (2008), there is no industry in Béni Abbès, which explains the high rate of unemployment (60%) for the population of working age.

The Power station of Béni Abbès supplied all villages between Igli and Beni Ikhlef until 2010 when the villages between Kerzaz and Beni Ikhlef switched to the Charouine station. The electrification rate is assessed at 86% but the region has not yet supplied with Town gas.

A project costing 17 billion dinar for a pipeline over 300 kilometers to supply town gas to the Districts of Béni Abbés, Béchar, Kénadsa, Abadla, Taghit and Béni Ounif commenced in 2010.

Béni Abbès has the potential to be an important investment location due to the basic infrastructure it already has. A carbonated water factory, although inactive for the moment, was in operation during the eighties under the socialist system and between 1998 and 2001 under the private sector. The bottling company of Ain Sidi Othmane water blocked for a long time.

In addition the city has real potential to produce glass, tiles and porcelain.

==== Agriculture ====
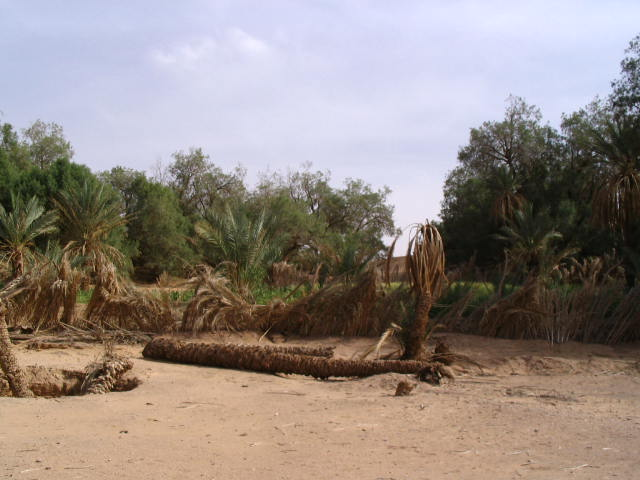
part of the Béni Abbès palm grove affected by fusarium

The Béni Abbès palm grove is 40 hectares in area. It is not large enough to ensure food self-sufficiency for the population of around 11,000 inhabitants, considering that most fields have been abandoned due to inheritance issues, lack of water, and movement of labor to other sectors that have higher profitability.

The useful agricultural area is 415 hectares spread over several locations of the Municipality. The largest estimated area is of Jouiffa (120 hectares), but just 5% of the plots are electrified. Other agricultural areas include Ain Seguia, Ouarourout, and Zghamra. There are 250 fellah (farmers), many of whom have abandoned their fields because of the scarcity of water.

In 1908, The Béni Abbès palm grove was affected for first time by the fungal pathogen Fusarium, after the disease appeared in 1870 in south Morocco. A different strain of Fusarium oxysporum was isolated in 1998 from the land of the Beni Abbes palm grove.

As of 2009 there were 1,134 sheep, 1,904 goats, 1,339 camels, and 5 cattle]. There were also 2200 chickens in 6 buildings.

=== Mineral Resources ===
The territory of Béni Abbès contains many important mineral resources. Among them is sand, useful for the production of brick and limestone clicks and hollow glass. The other minerals are concentrated mainly in the mountainous Ougarta Range to the southwest. A satellite photo of these mountains shows important mining areas containing mineral deposits of gold, silver, copper, iron, manganese, barium, arsenic, tungsten, strontium and lead, which is mixed with zinc.

=== Transport ===
Béni Abbès has limited means of transportation. The bus station covers all the movement needs of citizens with local lines to Béchar, Igli, El Ouata, Kerzaz and Ouled Khoudir, and an extraprovincial line to Adrar.

The opening of the new road between Béni Abbès and El Ouata was going out the ksars between these two cities of anonymity, this project has cost 30,033,900 dinars.

In addition to transport by bus, Béni Abbès has an airport dating back to the colonial era. The possibility of a railway between Béni Abbès and Bechar is being considered.

There is a total length of 127 kilometres (79 mi) of roads in the commune. The town has two fuel service stations.

== Sports ==
The most important sports practiced in Béni Abbès are football, handball, and athletics. Other less common sports include sand skiing, volleyball and swimming.

Béni Abbès had a football club since the late 1950s, one of the oldest clubs in the region but it has not performed well for the lack of financial means.

The best-known athletes who trace their origins to Béni Abbès:

- Nahida Touhami: specialist 800 and 1500 m athlete.
- Bergoug El Hadj: handball goalkeeper of JS Kabylie.

== Politics ==
=== List of mayors of Béni Abbès ===
The first mayor is Ben Said Mokhtar, named immediately after independence in July 1962. The second was Trabelsi Muhammad, the first PAPC (president of the Communal People's Assembly).

- Ben Said Mokhtar
- Trabelsi Mouhammed
- Abdelatif Abdelatif
- Alla Mouhammed
- Kebir Bachir
- Belabbes Mouhammed
- Moumen (Boukhobza) Ahmed
- Bouhadda Abdellah
- Benmoussa Abdelkader
- Abdeldjebar Mhamed
- Kebir Nadjib
- Bouhadda Abdellah

=== List of heads of Béni Abbès District ===
The heads of Béni Abbès District are presented in the following table:

Name	Période de travail
Mohamed Maamar	1967–1971
Guesmia Boudjemmâa "El-Montassir"	1976–1981
Saci Ahmed Abdelhafid	1992–1997
Raouani Mahmoud	1997–2002
Mehdi Khouazem	2002–2007
Mohamed Habri	Octobre 2009- ...

== Localities ==
The commune is composed of three localities:

- Béni Abbès
- Zerhamra
- Ougarta

Both Zerhamra and Ougarta are located beneath the Ougarta Range to the south. Zerhamra is 35 kilometres (22 mi) southwest of Béni Abbès, while Ougarta is 50 kilometres (31 mi) south of the town.

== Named after the city ==
- Beni-Abbes Community: This organization is named after the city, because it was the place stability of Saint Charles Eugène de Foucauld

== Twinned cities ==
Béni Abbès is twinned with the following cities:

- Sidi Ghiles (Tipaza) Algeria.
- Septèmes-les-Vallons France.
