= Ougarta Range =

Mountain range in Béchar Province, Algeria

- سلاسل الوقارتة
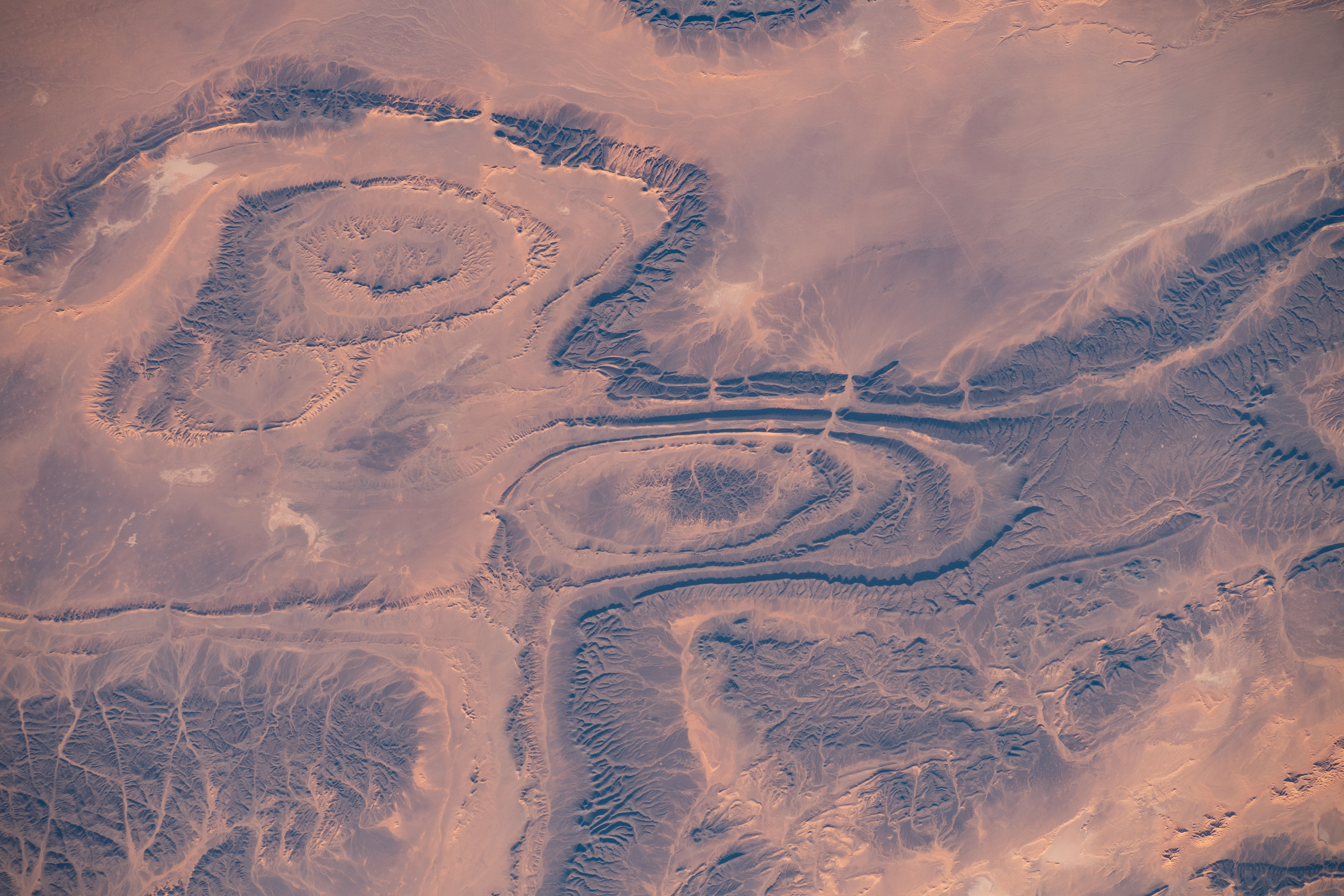
- Parts of the Ougarta Range, as seen from the ISS

Highest point
- Peak: Djebel Bet Touaris
- Elevation: 890 m (2,920 ft)

Dimensions
- Length: 250 km (160 mi) northwest-southeast
- Width: 50 km (31 mi)

Geography
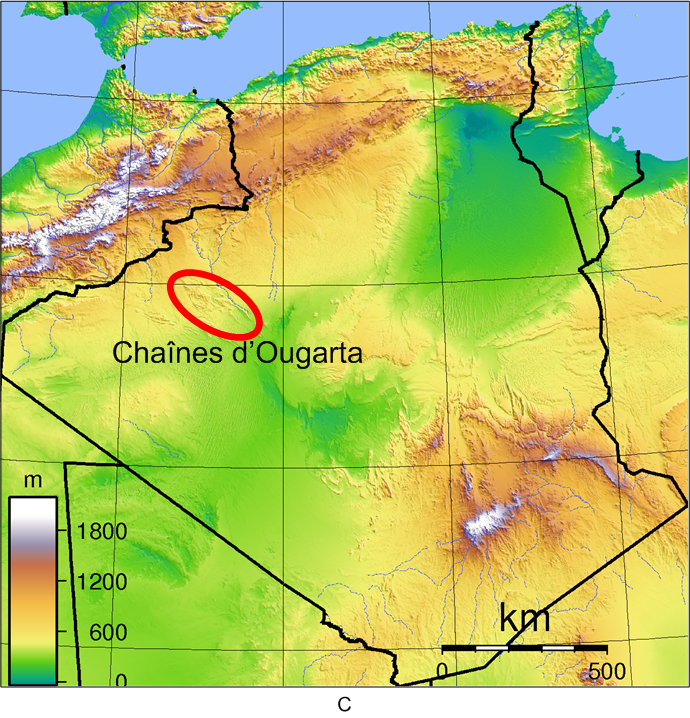
- Location of the Ougarta Range in Algeria
- Country: Algeria
- Province: Béchar Province
- Range coordinates: 29°36′N 2°21′W

Ougarta Range or Mountains of Ougarta (Arabic: سلاسل الوقارتة, French: Chaînes d'Ougarta) are a mountain range in the Saoura area of southwestern Algeria. The range is oriented from northwest to southeast, and extends over a length of 250 kilometres (160 mi) to a maximum width of 50 kilometres (31 mi).

The highest point of the Ougarta Range is Djebel Bet Touaris (elevation 890 m), located in the extreme northwest of the chain. The other major peaks are Djebel Rhennouma (867 m) and Djebel Berga Saida (855 m), both located in the northwest.

The remaining peaks have an altitude between 772 m (northwest) and 602 m (southeast).

The Ougarta Range is surrounded:

- to the northeast by the Grand Erg Occidental (the valley of Oued Saoura is the boundary between the two geographical areas);
- to the northwest by the Erg Er Raoui.

The Ougarta Range is named after the village and oasis of Ougarta, which lies amongst the mountains. Other towns lying next to the range are the village of Zerhamra in the northwest, and Béni Ikhlef and Kerzaz in the southeast.
