= El Ouata =

El Ouata اﻟﻮاتة
- Commune and town
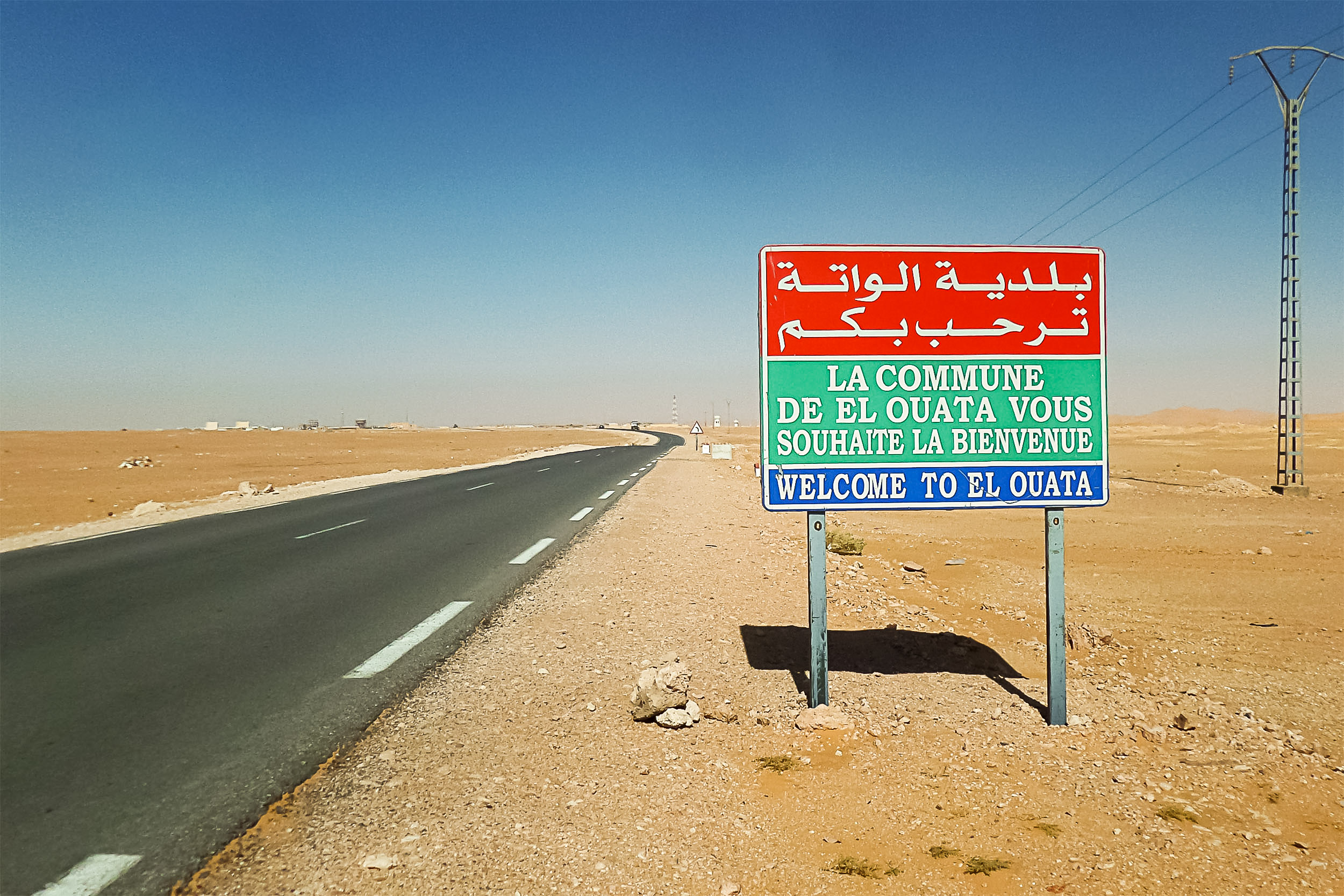

- Location of El Ouata commune within Béchar Province

- Location of El Ouata within Algeria
- Coordinates: 29°52′N 1°50′W
- Country: Algeria
- Province: Béchar Province
- District: El Ouata District

Area
  - Total: 7,950 km^{2} (3,070 sq mi)
- Elevation: 431 m (1,414 ft)

Population (2008)
  - Total: 7,343
  - Density: 0.924/km^{2} (2.39/sq mi)
- Time zone: UTC+1 (CET)

El Ouata (Arabic: اﻟﻮاتة) is a town and commune in Béchar Province, western Algeria. The commune is coextensive with El Ouata District, which is named after the town. According to the 2008 census its population is 7,343, up from 7,014 in 1998, with an annual population growth rate of 0.5%. The commune covers an area of 2,870 square kilometres (1,110 sq mi).

== Geography ==
El Ouata lies on the left (northeast) bank of the Oued Saoura in the Saoura valley. The Grand Erg Occidental, a large area of continuous sand dunes lies to the east, while the rocky ridges of the Ougarta Range rise to the west, running from northwest to southeast along the opposite side of the river from the town.

== Climate ==
El Ouata has a hot desert climate, with extremely hot summers and warm winters, and very little precipitation throughout the year.

Climate data for El Ouata
Month	Jan	Feb	Mar	Apr	May	Jun	Jul	Aug	Sep	Oct	Nov	Dec	Year
Mean daily maximum °C (°F)	18.8 (65.8)	22.0 (71.6)	26.0 (78.8)	30.6 (87.1)	35.4 (95.7)	41.9 (107.4)	44.6 (112.3)	44.0 (111.2)	40.0 (104.0)	32.8 (91.0)	24.9 (76.8)	18.8 (65.8)	31.7 (89.0)
Daily mean °C (°F)	11.2 (52.2)	14.2 (57.6)	18.2 (64.8)	22.5 (72.5)	27.3 (81.1)	32.6 (90.7)	36.2 (97.2)	35.7 (96.3)	31.5 (88.7)	24.6 (76.3)	17.6 (63.7)	12.0 (53.6)	23.6 (74.6)
Mean daily minimum °C (°F)	3.7 (38.7)	6.4 (43.5)	10.5 (50.9)	14.5 (58.1)	19.2 (66.6)	24.3 (75.7)	27.8 (82.0)	26.7 (80.1)	23.0 (73.4)	16.4 (61.5)	10.4 (50.7)	5.3 (41.5)	15.7 (60.2)
Average precipitation mm (inches)	8 (0.3)	6 (0.2)	3 (0.1)	3 (0.1)	3 (0.1)	1 (0.0)	1 (0.0)	2 (0.1)	4 (0.2)	7 (0.3)	8 (0.3)	8 (0.3)	54 (2)
Source: climate-data.org

== Economy ==
Agriculture is the main industry in El Ouata. The commune has a total of 1,680 hectares (4,200 acres) of arable land, of which 1,264 hectares (3,120 acres) is irrigated. There are a total of 136,180 date palms planted in the commune. As of 2009 there were 1,009 sheep, 1,140 goats, 1,011 camels, and 8 cattle.

Tourism in El Ouata is mainly focused around the sand dunes, palm groves, the old ksar, and the nearby Ougarta Range.

== Infrastructure and housing ==
85% of El Ouata's population are connected to drinking water (the second lowest rate in the province), but 100% are connected to the sewerage system, and 81% (including 2,527 buildings) have access to electricity (the equal lowest in the province). There is one fuel service station in the town.

El Ouata has a total of 1,503 houses, of which 905 are occupied, giving an occupation rate of 8.1 inhabitants per occupied building.

== Transportation ==
El Ouata is on the N6 national highway between Béchar to the northwest and Adrar to the southeast. Towns accessible to the north via the N6 include Béni Abbès and Igli, while to the south the towns of Béni Ikhlef, Kerzaz, Timoudi and Ouled Khoudir can be accessed.

There is a total length of 42 kilometres (26 mi) of roads in the commune.

El Ouata is 271 kilometres (168 mi) from the provincial capital, Béchar.

== Education ==
There are 8 elementary schools, with 57 classrooms including 39 in use. There are a total of 2,243 school students.

5.6% of the population has a tertiary education, and another 15.3% has competed secondary education. The overall literacy rate is 74.2%, and is 84.5% among males and 64.5% among females.

== Health ==
El Ouata has 2 polyclinics, 8 room care facilities, and a maternity ward.

== Religion ==
El Ouata has 11 operational mosques, with another 1 under construction.

== Localities ==
The commune is composed of 10 localities:

- El Ouata Centre
- Ksar Bouhadid
- Ksir El Ma
- Ammas
- El Madja
- Annefid
- Aguedal
- El Bayada
- Boukhlouf
- El Ouata Ksar
