= Béni Abbès Province =

Province of Algeria

Béni Abbas Province ولاية بني عباس
- Province
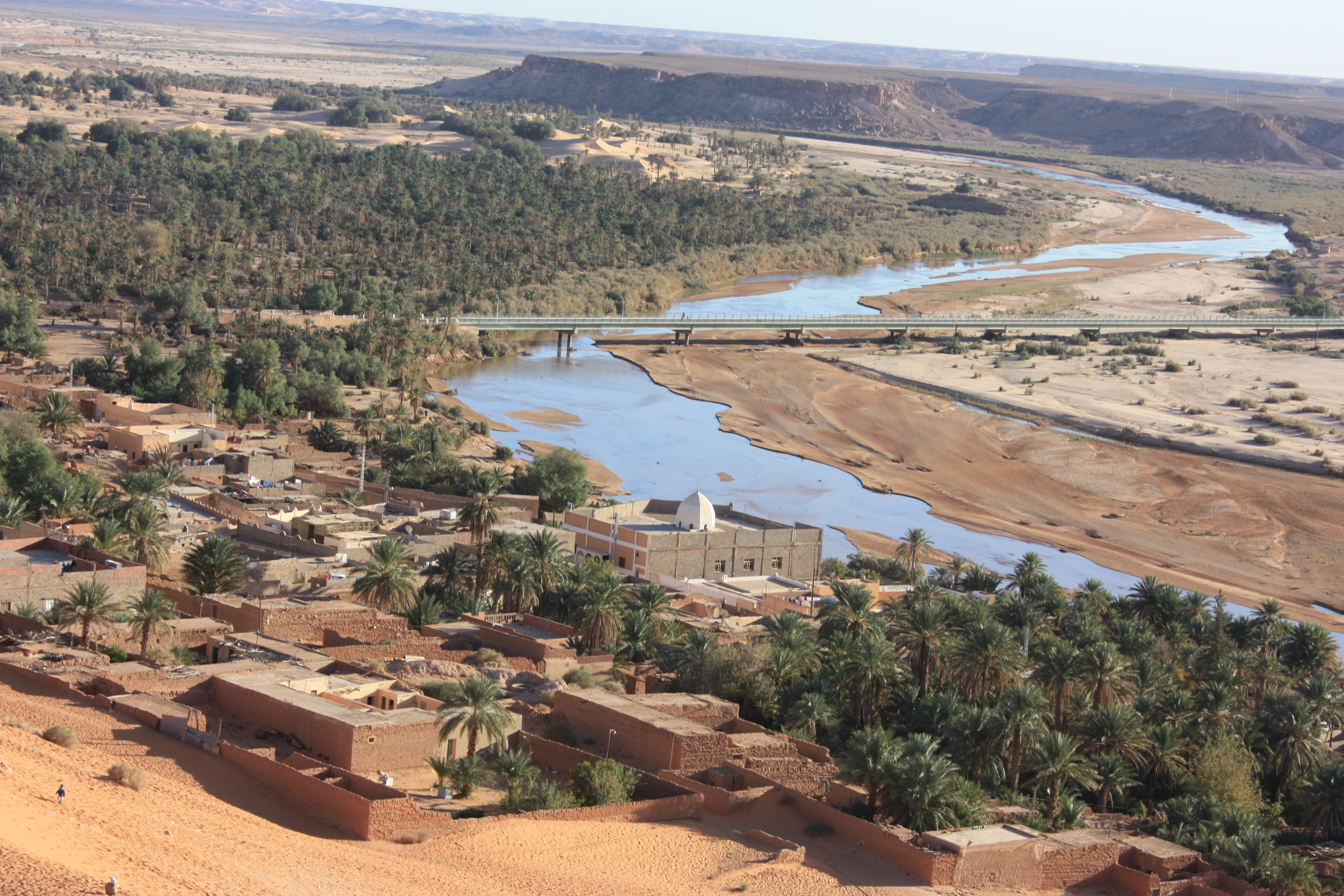
- Beni-Abbés Oued saoura

- Map of Algeria highlighting Béni Abbès
- Coordinates: 30°08′00″N 2°10′00″W
- Country: Algeria
- Established: December 18, 2019
- Capital: Béni Abbès

Government
  - Wāli: Boubakar Lansari

Area
  - Total: 101,350 km^{2} (39,130 sq mi)
- Elevation: 276 m (906 ft)

Population (2008)
  - Total: 50,163
  - Density: 0.49495/km^{2} (1.2819/sq mi)
- Time zone: UTC+01 (CET)
- Area code: +213 (0) 49
- ISO 3166 code: DZ-01
- Districts: 6
- Municipalities: 10

Béni Abbas (Arabic: ولاية بني عباس) is a province in southwestern Algeria. Created in 2019, previously, a delegated wilaya created in 2015. It is in the Algerian Sahara.

== Geography ==
The wilaya of Béni Abbès is in the Algerian Sahara; its area is 101,350 km^{2}.

It is delimited:

- to the north by the Béchar Province and Morocco;
- to the east by the Timimoun Province;
- to the west by the Tindouf Province;
- and to the south by the Tindouf Province and Adrar Province.

The greater part of the province is uninhabitable sand dune fields (ergs), in particular the Great Western Erg and the Erg Er Raoui, or dry plains (hamadas) suitable for grazing but with insufficient surface water to support agriculture. Most settlements are concentrated in oases along the Saoura valley and its tributaries. An aquifer under the Erg Er Raoui supports the main exception, Tabelbala.

Natural resources include copper in the south in Djebel Ben Tagine.

== History ==
The oases' traditional economic basis was agriculture, notably growing date palms and grain. The inhabitants of Igli speak Berber, and those of Tabelbala a Songhay language, Korandje; elsewhere, Arabic is spoken. Many of the oases had significant populations of haratin or shurfa. A notable zaouia (traditional religious school) is found at Kerzaz. The region also supported a substantial mainly Arab pastoralist nomadic population, notably the Ghenanma, Chaamba, and Reguibat; some of these still remain nomadic, but most have settled in the oases. Trans-Saharan trade routes passing through this region played an important role in its economy in pre-modern times, but have at present been superseded.

== Administrative divisions ==
The province is made up of 6 districts and 10 municipalities.

The districts are:

1. Béni Abbès
2. Kerzaz
3. El Ouata
4. Tabelbala
5. Ouled Khodeïr
6. Igli

The municipalities are:

1. Beni Abbes
2. Beni Ikhlef
3. El Ouata
4. Igli
5. Kerzaz
6. Ksabi
7. Ouled Khoudir
8. Tabelbala
9. Tamtert
10. Timoudi

== History ==
The wilaya of Béni Abbès was created on November 26, 2019.

Previously, it was a delegated wilaya, created according to the law n° 15–140 of May 27, 2015, creating administrative districts in certain wilayas and fixing the specific rules related to them, as well as the list of municipalities that are attached to it. Before 2019, it was attached to the Béchar Province.

== Organization of the wilaya ==
During the administrative breakdown of 2015, the delegated wilaya of Béni Abbès is made up of 10 communes and 3 Districts
