= Peyerimhoff =

Peyerimhoff is a surname. It may refer to:

- Henri de Peyerimhoff (entomologist) (1838–1877), French magistrate and entomologist
- Henri de Peyerimhoff (1871–1953), French civil servant and industrialist
- Paul de Peyerimhoff de Fontenelle (1873–1957), French naturalist, botanist, entomologist, and zoologist
- Sigrid D. Peyerimhoff (born 1937), German theoretical chemist
