= Albert Métin =

French teacher, professor, author and politician

Emile Albert Métin
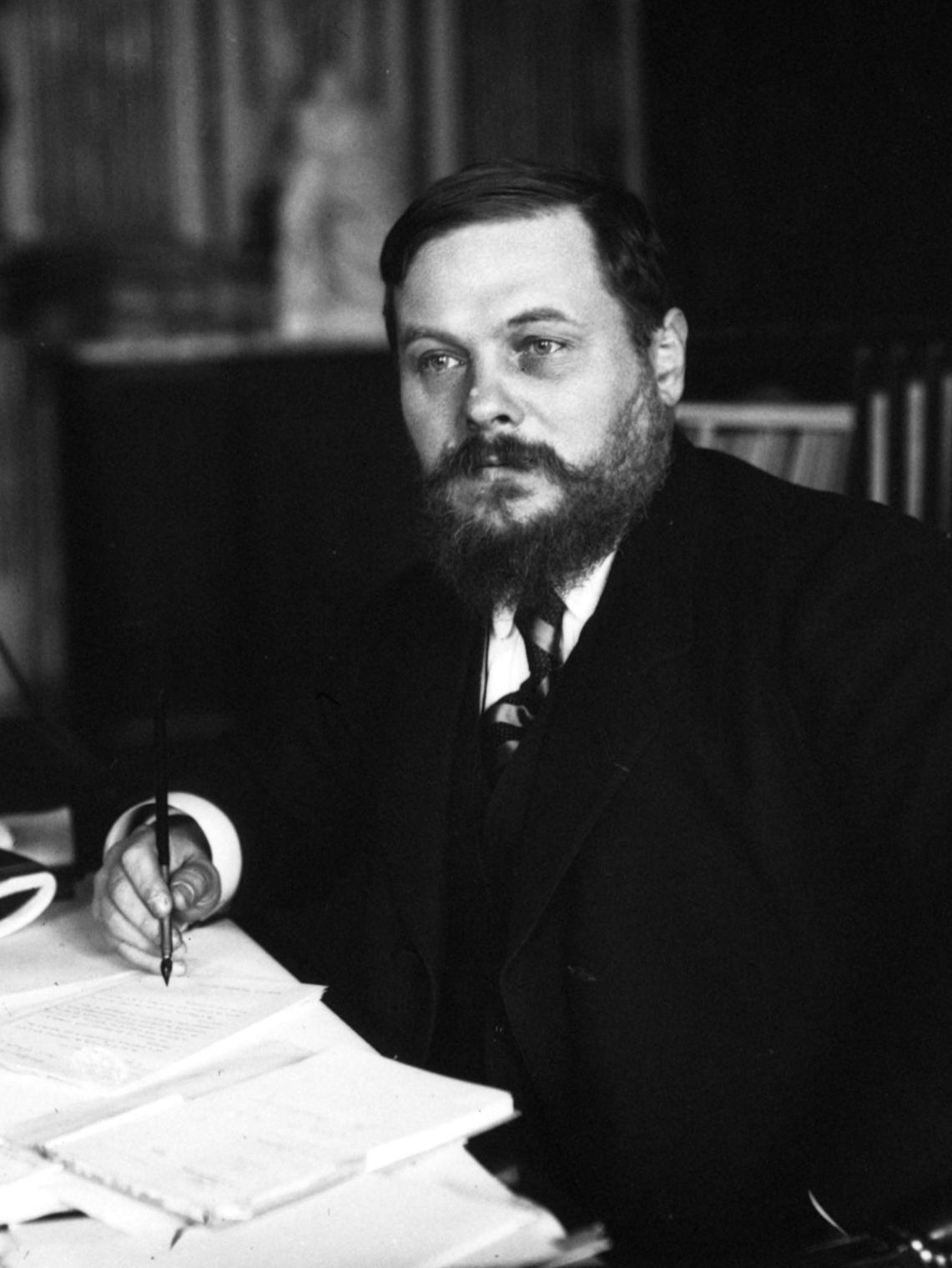
- Albert Métin in 1913

Minister of Labor and Social Welfare
- In office 9 December 1913 – 3 June 1914
- Prime Minister: Gaston Doumergue
- Preceded by: Henry Chéron
- Succeeded by: Jean-Baptiste Abel
- In office 29 October 1915 – 12 December 1916
- Prime Minister: Aristide Briand
- Preceded by: Jean-Baptiste Bienvenu-Martin
- Succeeded by: Étienne Clémentel

Personal details
- Born: 28 January 1871 Besançon, Doubs, France
- Died: 16 August 1918 (aged 47) San Francisco, US
- Occupation: Politician

Emile Albert Métin (French pronunciation: [emil albɛʁ metɛ̃]; 28 January 1871 – 16 August 1918) was a French teacher and professor of history and geography, a prolific author and a politician who was twice Minister of Labor and Social Welfare.

== Life ==
=== Early years ===
Albert Métin was born on 23 January 1871 in Besançon, Doubs. He was a brilliant scholar, and gained degrees in History and Geography. He became a professor at the Conservatoire national des arts et métiers.

Métin was one of the first to receive a travel grant from the University of Paris. He spent 18 months travelling around the world, and visited Australia and New Zealand. In New Zealand in 1899 he found that the radical social legislation in New Zealand had been implemented in a series of pragmatic steps that addressed specific issues, and had little grounding in political theory. He could not understand how New Zealand could have the world's "most advanced labor legislation" with "the weakest labor party." He coined the phrase "Socialism with no doctrine" (Le socialisme sans doctrines) to describe the Australasian reforms.

On his return Métin wrote Le socialisme sans doctrines: la question agraire et la question ouvrière en Australie et Nouvelle-Zélande in which he described "these countries in which the state has set limits to the right of property, has instituted the eight-hour day, the minimum wage, compulsory arbitration, with many other measures which have given the English antipodean colonies the surname Paradise of Workingmen." He strongly disapproved of the support given by labor to queen, empire and church. He wrote that labor was, "not in the least interested in building a socialist society, but in aping the bourgeoisie and in winning for themselves all the concessions and advantages possible within a capitalist society."

In October 1904 Métin was head of a French delegation that visited the Louisiana Purchase Exposition in St. Louis, US. The delegation visited Quebec, mainly Quebec City and Montreal, from 12–15 October. The party included several leading radicals, including Alphonse Verville, Joseph-Alphonse Rodier, Joseph Ainey, Isisdore Tremblay and Narcisse Arcand.

=== Pre-war politics ===
On the basis of his work on foreign labor laws Métin was selected by René Viviani as chief of staff in the Ministry of Labor when it was created by Georges Clemenceau in 1906. Métin was elected Deputy for the second district of Besançon on 12 December 1909, and was reelected on 24 April 1910 and on 26 April 1914 as a Democratic Republican. He sat with the radical socialists. He also became General Councillor of Doubs. In the period before World War I (1914–18) he was a member of commissions on social security, civil pensions, fiscal legislation, the budget and foreign affairs. On 9 December 1913 Gaston Doumergue appointed him Minister of Labor and Social Security, a position he held until 3 June 1914. He was supported by the journal le Petit Comtois, which in January 1914 reported his work to give workers access to low-cost housing, to improve old age pensions, particularly for women and widows, to obtain disability pensions and to provide insurance against agricultural accidents. The journal published his historical history of Ornans and Amancey.

=== World War I ===
After the declaration of war Métin was mobilized and served as an infantry lieutenant on the eastern front. Métin returned to the chamber, and was general rapporteur for the budget committee. He was again appointed Minister of Labor and Social Security from 29 October 1915 to 12 December 1916 in the cabinet of Aristide Briand. He was Sub-Secretary of State for Finance from 14 December 1916 to 17 August 1917. On 27 July 1917 Denys Cochin submitted his resignation as sub-secretary of state for Foreign Affairs, largely due to frustration over difficulties in achieving a full blockade of Germany and her allies. The cabinet accepted Cochin's resignation on 10 August 1917. Metin took his place, holding office until Clemenceau created a blockade ministry under Charles-Célestin Jonnart on 17 November 1917. Métin was then appointed head of the French mission to Australia. His friend André Siegfried was secretary general of the mission from July 1918. Métin died on 16 August 1918 in San Francisco of apoplexy, thought to have been caused by the strain of his work on the mission. He was a knight of the Legion of Honor.

== Publications ==
Albert Métin was a prolific author. Some of his books went through several editions, in some cases revised and updated by others.

=== Textbooks ===
- Albert Métin (1903). Cours d'instruction civique pour l'enseignement primaire supérieur. Paris: Masson. p. 192.
- Albert Métin (1904). Cours d'économie politique et de droit usuel pour l'enseignement primaire supérieur, par Albert Métin,... Paris: Masson. p. 344.
- Albert Métin (1910–1912). Cours de géographie. Vol. 1–3. Paris: A. Colin. pp. 351, 331, 392.
- Élie Bertrand; Albert Métin (preface) (1910). Cours de géographie commerciale, la France et ses colonies, les principales puissances du monde, à l'usage des écoles pratiques de commerce et d'industrie... Troisième année. Paris: H. Dunod et E. Pinat. p. 360.
- Albert Métin (1911). Cours de droit usuel, à l'usage des écoles primaires supérieures (programme du 26 juillet 1909), par Albert Métin,... 3e édition. Paris: Masson. p. 192.
- Albert Métin; Henri Goy (1912). Géographie du brevet élémentaire. Paris: A. Colin. p. 362.
- Albert Métin; Henri Flandre (1912). Histoire du brevet élémentaire. Paris: A. Colin. p. 456.
- Albert Métin; André Siegfried (reviewed and updated by) (1920). Cours d'économie politique à l'usage des écoles primaires supérieures (5 ed.). Paris: Masson. p. 184.
- François Goguel; Albert Métin; André Siegfried (1935). Cours d'instruction civique et notions de morale sociale. Enseignement primaire supérieur (programmes de 1920) (10 ed.). Paris: Masson. p. 240.

=== History and Geography ===
- Albert Métin (1903). L'Inde d'aujourd'hui, étude sociale (India Today, Social Study). Paris: A. Colin. p. 304.
- Albert Métin (1903). La Transformation de l'Égypte ... Les indigènes, Français et Anglais, la lutte d'influences, le développement économique. Paris: F. Alcan. p. 315.
- Charles Seignobos; Albert Métin (1904). Histoire moderne 1715-1815 (Modern History 1715-1815). Paris: A. Colin. p. 605.
- Charles Seignobos; Albert Métin (1904). Histoire contemporaine depuis 1815 (Modern History From 1815). Paris: A. Colin. p. 717.
- Albert Métin (1905). L'Extrême-Orient : Chine, Japon, Russie, par Albert Métin. Paris. p. 127.
- Albert Métin (1908). La Colombie britannique (British Columbia). Paris: A. Colin. pp. 431.
- Albert Métin (1913). Histoire des communes du canton d'Ornans (History of the Canton of Ornans). Besançon: Impr. de J. Millot. p. 195.

=== Other works ===
- Albert Métin (1897). Le Socialisme en Angleterre (Socialism in England). Paris: F. Alcan. p. 309.
- Albert Métin (1901). Le socialisme sans doctrines: la question agraire et la question ouvrière en Australie et Nouvelle-Zélande (Socialism without Doctrines). Paris: F. Alcan. p. 281.
- Albert Métin (1901). Ministère du Commerce, de l'industrie, des postes et des télégraphes. Office du travail. Législation ouvrière et sociale en Australie et Nouvelle-Zélande. Mission de M. Albert Métin. Paris: Impr. nationale. p. 200.
- Léon Bourgeois; Albert Métin (1902). Déclaration des droits de l'homme et du citoyen, 1789, expliquée et accompagnée de lectures. Paris: E. Cornély. p. 95.
- Albert Métin (1904). "Deux aspects du mouvement social en Italie (Two Aspects of the Social Movement in Italy". Le Musée social, mémoires et documents. Mars 1904. Paris: A. Rousseau. pp. 65–96.
- Albert Métin (1905). La Révolution et l'autonomie locale (Revolution and Local Autonomy). Toulouse: Société provinciale d'édition. p. 29.
- Albert Métin (1907). Exposition internationale de Saint-Louis 1904. Délégation ouvrière française aux États-Unis et au Canada. Rapports des délégués... recueillis... publiés et complétés par deux études sur le travail aux États-Unis et le travail au Canada. Paris: E. Cornély. p. 301.
- Albert Métin (1909). "Le Mouvement social en Australasie (The Social Movement in Australasia) I. Le minimum de salaire. II. Les retraites pour la vieillesse. III. La protection des ouvriers et employés". Le Musés social, mémoires et documents. Novembre 1909. Paris: A. Rousseau. pp. 281–303.
- Albert Métin (1908). Les Traités ouvriers, accords internationaux de prévoyance et de travail : textes officiels, commentaire et historique. Paris: A. Colin. pp. 272.
- Albert Métin (1908). Les Traités de prévoyance et de travail, textes, commentaire et historique, thèse complémentaire pour le doctorat ès lettres présentées à la Faculté des lettres de Paris. Paris: A. Colin. p. 223.
- Albert Métin (1911). Organisation des cultivateurs : assurances mutuelles, institutions communales et coopératives, syndicats agricoles, caisses de crédit agricole, par Albert Métin,... Besançon: impr. de J. Millot. p. 70.
- Albert Métin; Jean Merklen (1912). Les Retraites ouvrières et paysannes, manuel pratique pour l'application de la loi du 5 avril 1910 sur les retraites. Paris: M. Imhaus. p. 367.
- Albert Métin (1916). L'Indochine et l'opinion. Paris: H. Dunod et E. Pinat. p. 437.

=== Translations ===
- Andrew Carnegie (1906). Pour l'Arbitrage, discours rectoral adressé aux étudiants de l'Université écossaise de Saint-André, par M. Andrew Carnegie. Translation into French by Albert Métin. Preface by Paul-Henri-Benjamin d'Estournelles de Constant. Paris: C. Delagrave. p. 95.
- Robert Alexander Peddie; Beatrice Webb; Sidney Webb (1897). Histoire du trade unionisme. Translation into French by Albert Métin. Paris: V. Giard et E. Brière. p. 615.

== Sources ==
- "Albert Métin (1871-1918)". BnF.
- "ALBERT METIN DIES FROM WAR STRAIN; Chief of French Mission to Australia Stricken with Apoplexy in San Francisco.FOUND IN COMA IN ROOM Member of Chamber of Deputies and Ex-Minister Won War Cross While Serving with His Regiment". New York Times. 1918-08-17.
- "Albert Métin, un élu de gauche qui sera dans "l'Union sacrée"". 2014-01-01.
- A. W. S. (September 1901). "Reviewed Work: Le Socialisme sans Doctrines. by Albert Metin". American Journal of Sociology. 7 (2). The University of Chicago Press. doi:10.1086/211058. JSTOR 2762347.
- Farrar, Marjorie Milbank (1974). Conflict and Compromise. Springer Science & Business Media. ISBN 978-94-010-1992-7.
- Jolly, Jean (1977). "Albert MÉTIN". Dictionnaire des parlementaires français de 1889 à 1940.
- Leroux, Éric (2000). "L'influence du radicalisme français au Québec". Mens: Revue d'histoire intellectuelle de l'Amérique française. Presses Université Laval. ISSN 1492-8647.
- Phillips, Jock (2014-10-06). "Ideas in New Zealand - Socialism". Te Ara - the Encyclopedia of New Zealand.
- Sanguin, André-Louis (2010-04-01). André Siegfried: Un visionnaire humaniste entre géographie et politique. Editions L'Harmattan. ISBN 978-2-296-25598-2.
- Weir, Robert E. (2009-01-14). Knights Down Under: The Knights of Labour in New Zealand. Cambridge Scholars Publishing. ISBN 978-1-4438-0436-3.
