= Révoil =

Révoil is a French surname. It may refer to:

- Fanély Revoil (1906–1999), French opera and operetta singer
- Henri Révoil (1822–1900), French architect
- Pierre Révoil (1776–1842), French painter in the troubadour style
- Paul Révoil (1856–1914), French diplomat and administrator
