= Ruta Jusionyte =

French-Lithuanian artist and sculptor

- Website: http://www.rutajusionyte.com/index.php?PHPSESSID=0b6mlrinjdnsbs5395n850rq60

Ruta Jusionyte (born 1978) is a French-Lithuanian artist. She is a painter and sculptor.

== Biography ==
Jusionyte was born in Klaipėda and studied in the Vilnius Academy of Arts. In 2000 she left Lithuania for Paris and works and resides there. She has been holding solo and group exhibitions since 2003. Her works are held in public and private collections. She is the daughter of the prominent Lithuanian painter Algimantas Jusionis.

== Work ==
Jusionyte is a figurative Expressionist. Unlike much 20th century and more recent Expressionism, her work does not primarily focus on angst and fragmentation, but can be seen as an affirmation, and a positive representation, of our humanity. As journalist and art reviewer Florence Millioud-Henriques has written, reviewing an exhibition at Galerie Univers in Lausanne: "There is the mermaid and the man, the couple and the carp, the woman and the parrot, the rabbit and the woman. All have in common the desire to share, to touch, to protect, to wrap themselves in the same universal tenderness and all seem to find a reason to exist in this harmonious equity of kingdoms, genders and sexes." And the French philosopher and Art historian Christian Noorbergen has written of her art that it "exults wild health, and the immense weight of devouring life." Her paintings and sculptures are characterised by an emotive, gestural and lyrical technique, in either oil paint or terracotta, which links her stylistically to European Expressionism. She also produces sculptures in bronze. Recent paintings demonstrate an increasing interest in atmosphere and dramatic lighting.

Her subject matter ranges from human beings, expressive of bravery, confidence or fragility, and therianthropic or animal-human hybrid beings used as metaphors for the human condition. Her work is redolent of myths, fairy tales and Jungian archetypes, though with an emphasis on women's experience. Personal experiences are also imaginatively recast as ambiguous and at times unsettling narratives though, as with an artist like Paula Rego, humour and a subtle irony are also often present. Her work expresses an emotional tenderness that is distinct from much recent European art in an Expressionist mode. In an interview for online art daily echogonewrong with art writer Agnė Sadauskaitė, the artist has stated "This foundation, woman and man and their relationship, arises in my work, in sculptures or paintings. It could represent the issue of equality, or questions put to each other, who you are, how I will interact with you, what we will give each other. The psychologist Carl Gustav Jung states that we have femininity and masculinity (anima and animus) in ourselves, and over the years, masculinity grows stronger in women, and vice versa. In my work, there is a reflection on two sides in one person" Her interest in hybridisation has been remarked upon by French historian Thierry Delcourt: "She aims to extract a composite figure, acting as its roiling, turbulent transmitter. Like Germaine Richier and Gérard Garouste, she unfolds and unfurls her own matrix, teeming with her own culture and imagination. Words, things, and shapes collide, enabling her to produce hybrid figures that are on occasion misshapen from being underpinned by the richness of what produced them. Dreams give us an occasionally nightmarish foretaste, like the figures of Hieronymous Bosch or Goya’s Caprichos. It may well be the case that these avatars – polymorphic, spiritual monsters – are a better, truer rendition of humanity than Romantic figures stripped of ambiguity and the play of polysemy."

== Awards ==
In 2015 Jusionyte was awarded the Georges Coulon prize for figurative sculpture at the Académie Royale des Beaux-Arts.

== Collections ==
Her sculptures and paintings are in public collections and museums such as M. K. Čiurlionis National Art Museum, Modern Art Museum Vilnius, Museum of Angels Vilnius and Lebwen Fondation in Lithuania, and the collections of the city of Mans and Pithiviers, France.

== Selected solo exhibitions ==
- 2018 Gallery Schwab Beaubourg, Paris, France
- 2018 Vilnius Art Fair, Gallery Menu Tiltas, Vilnius, Lithuania
- 2018 Gallery Crid’art, Metz, France
- 2018 Gallery Espace 83, Rochelle, France
- 2017 Gallery Claudine Legrand, rue de Seine, Paris, France
- 2017 Gallery Wagner, Frankfurt, Germany
- 2017 Gallery Kellermann, Düsseldorf, Germany
- 2017 Vilnius Art Fair, Gallery Menu Tiltas, Vilnius, Lithuania
- 2016 Karlsuhe Art Fair, Gallery Wagner, Frankfurt, Germany
- 2016 Vilnius Art Fair, Gallery Menu Tiltas, Vilnius, Lithuania
- 2016 Lille Art Up, Gallery Claudine Legrand, Paris France
- 2015 Gallery Crid’Art, Metz, France
- 2015 Vilnius Art Fair, Gallery Menu Tiltas, Vilnius, Lithuania
- 2015 Gallery Claudine Legrand, rue de Seine, Paris, France
- 2015 Gallery 22 Art Contemporain, Cabrières d’Avignon, France
- 2014 Vilnius Art Fair, Gallery Menu Tiltas, Vilnius, Lithuania
- 2014 Gallery Danielle Bourdette-Gorzkowski, Honfleur, France
- 2014 Gallery Saint Rémy, Liège, Belgium
- 2014 Gallery Daniel Duchoze, Rouen, France
- 2013 Gallery Schwab, rue Quincampoix, Paris, France
- 2013 Gallery Claudine Legrand, rue de Seine, Paris, France
- 2013 Gallery Picot-le Roy, Morgat, France
- 2013 Gallery Univers, Lausanne, Switzerland
- 2013 Gallery La Louve, Arlon, Belgium
