= Eremolestes =

Scientific classification
- Domain: Eukaryota
- Kingdom: Animalia
- Phylum: Arthropoda
- Class: Insecta
- Order: Coleoptera
- Suborder: Adephaga
- Family: Carabidae
- Subfamily: Lebiinae
- Tribe: Lebiini
- Subtribe: Lionychina
- Genus: Eremolestes; Maindron, 1905

Genus of beetles

Eremolestes is a genus in the ground beetle family Carabidae. There are at least two described species in Eremolestes, found in Africa and Southwest Asia.

== Species ==
These two species belong to the genus Eremolestes:

- Eremolestes fallax (Peyerimhoff, 1929) (Algeria, Saudi Arabia, Senegal/Gambia, Nigeria, Eritrea, Djibouti, Somalia, Kenya)
- Eremolestes sulcatus (Chaudoir, 1876) (Saudi Arabia, Chad, Sudan, Eritrea, Djibouti)
