= Labergement-du-Navois =

- Part of Levier
- Coat of arms
- Location of Labergement-du-Navois
- Location within France Location within Bourgogne-Franche-Comté
- Coordinates: 46°58′39″N 6°04′52″E
- Country: France
- Region: Bourgogne-Franche-Comté
- Department: Doubs
- Arrondissement: Besançon
- Canton: Ornans
- Commune: Levier
- Area^{1}: 6.74 km^{2} (2.60 sq mi)
- Highest elevation: 832 m (2,730 ft)
- Lowest elevation: 697 m (2,287 ft)
- Population (2014): 108
  - Density: 16.0/km^{2} (41.5/sq mi)
- Time zone: UTC+01:00 (CET)
  - Summer (DST): UTC+02:00 (CEST)
- Postal code: 25270
- ^{1} French Land Register data, which excludes lakes, ponds, glaciers > 1 km^{2} (0.386 sq mi or 247 acres) and river estuaries.

Labergement-du-Navois (French pronunciation: [labɛʁʒəmɑ̃ dy navwa]) is a former commune in the Doubs département in the Bourgogne-Franche-Comté region in eastern France. On 1 January 2017, it was merged into the commune Levier. Inhabitants of the commune are called Loups (wolves).

== Geography ==
The commune is located 10 km (6.2 mi) south of Amancey. From the Fly at 866 m, there are views of the Alps.

== History ==
As its name implies (abergement means lodging), the town grew up as a stop on the road to Italy during the reign of Louis XV and after Franche-Comté became part of France.

== See also ==
- Communes of the Doubs department
