= Union Minière =

Union Minière can refer to:

- Union Minière du Haut Katanga (UMHK), a mining company operating in Africa prior to 1966
- Umicore, a Belgian metals company and successor to UMHK, which traded as Union Minière prior to 1999

== See also ==
- Union des Mines
