= Harpalus mairei =

Scientific classification
- Kingdom: Animalia
- Phylum: Arthropoda
- Class: Insecta
- Order: Coleoptera
- Suborder: Adephaga
- Family: Carabidae
- Genus: Harpalus
- Species: H. mairei

Binomial name
- Harpalus mairei Peyerimhoff, 1928

Species of beetle

Harpalus mairei is a species of ground beetle in the subfamily Harpalinae. It was described by Paul de Peyerimhoff in 1928.
