= Henri de Peyerimhoff =

French senior civil servant and lobbyist

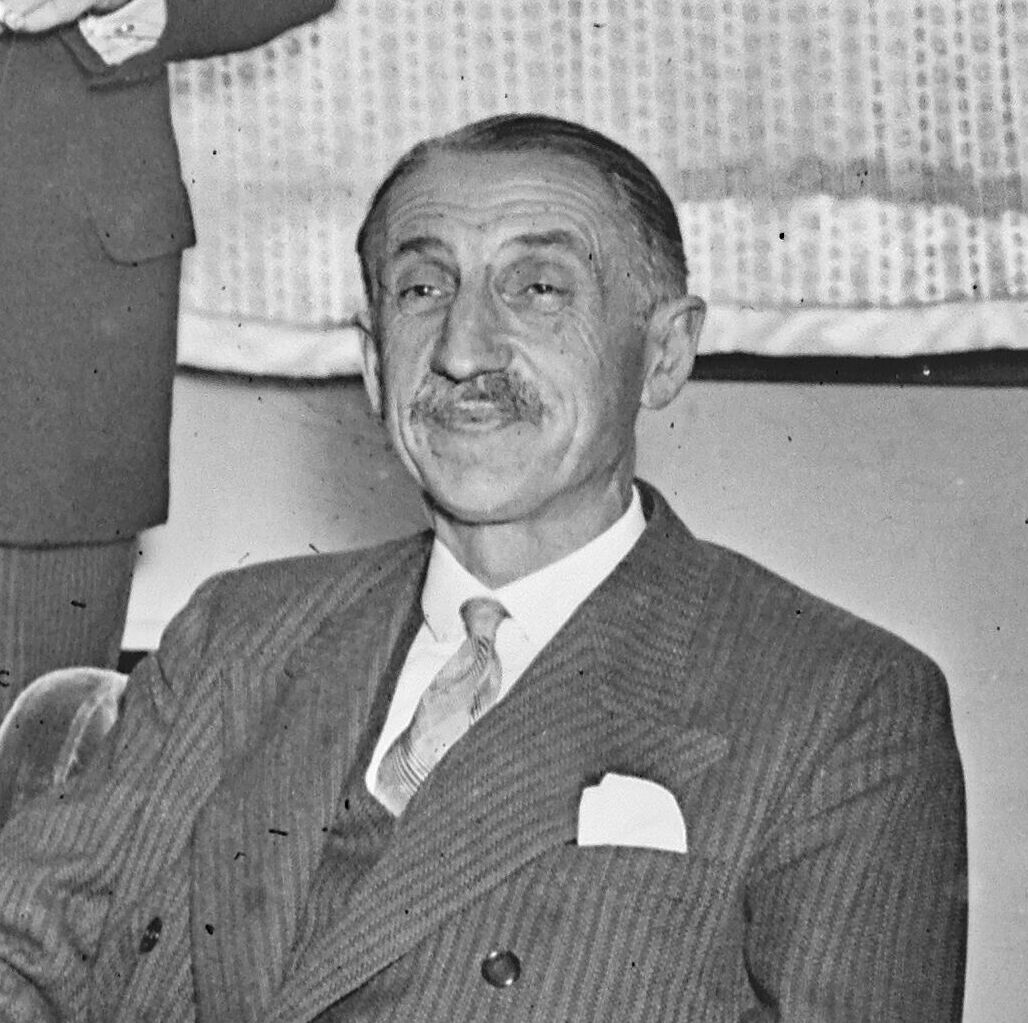
- Henri de Peyerimhoff in 1931
- Born: Henri Marie Joseph Hercule de Peyerimhoff de Fontenelle; 19 September 1871; Colmar, Alsace, France
- Died: 21 July 1953 (aged 81); Paris, France
- Occupations: Civil servant, industrialist

Henri de Peyerimhoff (19 September 1871 – 21 July 1953) was a French senior civil servant and then a lobbyist for the coal industry and president of several mining companies. He came from the minor aristocracy of Alsace and was son of a magistrate. At an early age he was made a senior administrator in the Council of State. He became bored with this work, resigned and became head of the colliery owner's association, whose interests he defended against other industries, the unions and the government. He became vice-president of the National Economic Council, and used that position to express his generally conservative views on social and industrial issues. He was in favour of paternalism and industrial cartels, and against state intervention.

== Early years 1871–1895 ==
Henri Marie Joseph Hercule de Peyerimhoff de Fontenelle was born in Colmar, Alsace on 19 September 1871. His family originated in 14th century Alsace near the borders with Bavaria and Baden. The Catholic branch associated with Switzerland assumed the name "Peyerimhoff de Fontenelle" in the late 18th century. His grandfather Hercule Jean-Baptiste de Peyerimhoff (1809-1890) was head of the Colmar municipal council and did much to modernise the city. His father was Henri de Peyerimhoff (1838–1877), a magistrate and entomologist who specialized in microlepidoptera (smaller moths). After the Franco-Prussian War (1870), when Alsace became part of Germany his father chose to stay with France, and became judge of the civil court of Moulins in 1873, and then in Perpignan. He suffered from poor health and died in 1877. Henri de Peyerimhoff's mother, Mme. Bellaigue, took her two sons Henri and Paul to live with her family in Nancy.

Henri de Peyerimhoff studied in Nancy at the Institution de la Malgrange, a religious college, where he met the future politician Louis Marin. He spent his holidays with his grandfather in Colmar. He was interested in mathematics and applied to enter the École Polytechnique but was rejected on the grounds that his rib cage was too small for his height. He responded by choosing to study philosophy and law, and went with his brother Paul to the École libre des sciences politiques, from which he graduated in the summer of 1893. He registered with the bar of Paris and began work as a lawyer, but did not like the work. In the spring of 1895 he heard that four places in the Conseil d'État were open for competition, prepared for the examination under Jacques Tardieu of the École libre, and was admitted. In April 1895 he was married in the cathedral of Moulins.

== Council of State 1895–1907 ==
Peyerimhoff was auditor at the Conseil d'État from 1895 to 1902, in the litigation section. The work was not particularly demanding. Édouard Laferrière, Vice-President (Note: The Vice-President of the Conseil d’Etat was in practice the head of the organization.) of the Conseil d’Etat, was temporarily appointed Governor General of Algeria at a time when the colony was experiencing a wave of antisemitism and serious financial difficulties. He took Peyerimhoff as head of his civil cabinet, but in July 1900 Peyerimhoff was called back to Paris by Georges Coulon, the new Vice-President of the Conseil d’Etat, and attached to the Interior section. Laferrière died, and in 1902 the new governor general of Algeria, Paul Révoil, created the position of "director of economic services" for Peyerimhoff, who settled with his wife in Algiers in April 1902. Révoil later resigned due to political disputes and was replaced by Charles Jonnart. Peyerimhoff prepared a huge survey of the results of colonization that was published in 1906.

Coulon thought Peyerimhoff should remain in Algeria and proposed to appoint him Prefect of Constantine, but he refused and in 1905 returned to the Conseil d’Etat where he was appointed Auditor First Class in the Legislation section. At the same time he retained an office in the Interior Ministry's Algerian Office, which caused an administrative conflict. He resigned from the Conseil d’Etat as of May 1907, and was made honorary Maître des requêtes. He continued to write about Algeria and paid tribute to people such as Eugène Étienne, Laferrière and Révoil with whom he had worked.

== Later career 1907–40 ==
=== Coal committee ===
Through his connections, and with the support of his maternal uncle Bellaigue, Peyerimhoff was appointed Secretary General of the Comité central des houillères de France (Central Committee of Coal Mines of France) in place of the engineer Édouard Gruner, who now concentrated on technical subjects. The committee was an industry lobby group with a staff of eighteen in Paris. Peyerimhoff was then in turn secretary general, vice president and president of the committee, the coal owners cartel, until that committee was dissolved in 1940. He defended the collieries against electricity and steel interests. He was interested in subjects such as trade unionism, workers' housing, social care for workers' children and controlled recruitment of Polish workers for French mines. In 1928 he wrote favorably about collective agreements in an article on Le Program Patronal in the Revue des Vivants.

As early as 1913 Peyerimhoff talked about the coal economy at the Musée social and Semaines sociales de France^{(fr)}, and wrote about it in the Revue de Paris and Revue des deux Mondes. In the late 1920s Peyerimhoff and Ernest Mercier headed the French delegation in the Comité Franco-Allemand d'Information et de Documentation, which tried to defuse the tension caused by the French occupation of the Ruhr and create cooperation between French and German industry. The deliberately informal but influential committee met eight times between May 1926 and May 1930 to discuss industrial cooperation in Europe. In July 1931 Peyerimhoff offered his unreserved support for a Franco-German economic accord.

=== Business elite ===
Peyerimhoff was often seen as a symbol of big business, and as a former senior official exemplified the collusion between the state and capitalism. In 1929 Peyerimhoff was part of a consortium that included François de Wendel and René-Paul Duchemin that paid a high premium to purchase a majority share in Le Temps, hoping to prevent the liberal paper from falling into the wrong hands. The deal became public in 1931 and gave further proof to those who thought the press was controlled by the powerful. In 1936 Le Crapouillot said he sat on the boards of eighteen companies. In 1939 the Chaix directory listed ten councils to which he belonged: Crédit national, Groupement des houillères du Nord et du Pas-de-Calais, Union des Mines (President), Société de gestion d’intérêts miniers et industriels français à l’étranger (President), Union industrielle de crédit pour la reconstitution, Compagnie générale d’électricité, Société des Forces motrices de la Truyère (President), Compagnie des mines de potasse de Blodelsheim, Société houillère de Sarre et Moselle (President) and the Compagnie des phosphates de Constantine (President).

Peyerimhoff has sometimes been accused of being a member of the Synarchy, but this seems exaggerated. Georges Valois identified Peyerimhoff as a member of an evil band of polytechniciens led by Jean Coutrot who had conspired against democracy, parliamentarianism and syndicalism since 1922 or 1923. Peyerimhoff did not always agree with other industry leaders, and François de Wendel accused him of being too close to radical leaders, but at other times he cooperated with Wendel. Peyerimhoff had been called "le gentleman du charbon" and a fonctionnaire patronal, but after being dismissed in 1940 he lost his influence in the coal industry.

=== Political views ===
Peyerimhoff was a member of the newly formed National Economic Council (CNE) from 1925, and Vice-President of the CNE from 1926 after the death of Robert Pinot. He defended the social policies of the colliery owners in the 1926 report of the National Economic Council. Peyerimhoff used his position in the CNE to give his views on a range of social and economic issues. He was in favour of industrial cartels but against the onerous controls on industry demanded by the General Confederation of Labour (CGT). He saw America as the model rather than the USSR. On behalf of the coal owners Peyerimhoff formally endorsed the corporatist Redressement Français at the closing session in the amphitheatre of the Sorbonne of its National Congress of Metropolitan and Colonial Organization in April 1927.

Peyerimhoff thought that unlike massive German conglomerates such as IG Farben the French model of industrial ententes let the member companies retain their identities and continue to compete to some extent. He observed that, "The state of 1850 was a legal and military entity. The state of 1930 is, above all, an economic apparatus. Although he was not a follower of Henri de Saint-Simon, Peyerimhoff thought the political structure of France needed basic change because politicians were no longer able to handle the problems of the modern economy. Among other ideas he thought the Senate should be restructured into an assembly that represented the different economic groups.

During the Great Depression Peyerimhoff backed the Fédération républicaine, the party of the "classic right". He seems to have moved further to the right after the triumph of the Popular Front in 1936. Police reports said he tried to buy François de La Rocque's Parti social français and bought Jacques Doriot's Parti populaire français. In 1938 Peyerimhoff and Louis Renault supported Georges Bonnet in opposing an intensive rearmament policy, which they thought would harm the economy.

== Last years 1940–53 ==
Peyerimhoff, who opposed state intervention, does not seem to have played any important role during World War II (1939–45). The Comité central des houillères de France was dissolved by decree on 9 November 1940, as was the Comité des forges. He wrote in his memoirs that nationalized industries generally preferred "the spectacular and the expensive" to "the efficient and profitable". In October 1944 he wrote to Charles de Gaulle urging him not to nationalize the coal mines, but his plea was ignored. After the war the mines were nationalized. In 1952 he was elected a free member of the Académie des Sciences Morales et Politiques. Henri de Peyerimhoff died in Paris on 21 July 1953 aged 81.

== Publications ==
Publications by Henri de Peyerimhoff de Fontenelle included:

- Henri de Peyerimhoff de Fontenelle (1906), Enquête sur les résultats de la colonisation officielle de 1871 à 1895 (Rapport à M. Jonnart, gouverneur général de l'Algérie), Alger: Impr. de Torrent / Algérie. Direction de l'agriculture et de la colonisation
- Henri de Peyerimhoff de Fontenelle (1912), H. de Peyerimhoff. Le Développement économique de la France. Les charbonnages français, Paris: A. Rousseau, pp. 137–162
- Charles de Lasteyrie; Angel Marvaud; Henri de Peyerimhoff de Fontenelle (1915), Intérêts économiques et rapports internationaux à la veille de la guerre (conférences organisées en 1914 par la Société des anciens élèves et élèves de l'École libre des sciences politiques), Bibliothèque d'histoire contemporaine, Paris: F. Alcan, p. 270
- Édouard Gruner; Henri de Peyerimhoff de Fontenelle (1924), Visite des exploitations de Merlebach et Sainte-Fontaine, Paris: Société houillère de Sarre et Moselle, p. 11
- Henri de Peyerimhoff de Fontenelle (1925), Société houillère de Sarre-et-Moselle...Allocution., Paris
- Henri de Peyerimhoff de Fontenelle (1 November 1925), "Le Problème houiller", La Revue de Paris, Paris: 24
- Henri de Peyerimhoff de Fontenelle (1927), Henry Darcy 1840-1926, Paris: Impr. Gauthier-Villars et Cie, p. 12
- Henri de Peyerimhoff de Fontenelle (1929), Les Formules modernes d'organisation économique et leurs connexions politiques et sociales (conférence tenue par M. Henri de Peyerimhoff, à Berlin, dans la salle des séances du Reichstag, le 17 décembre 1928), Paris: Gauthier-Villars, p. 28
- Paul Ernest-Picard; Louis-Félix-Marie-François Franchet d'Espèrey; Henri de Peyerimhoff de Fontenelle (1929), Une oeuvre française : L'Algérie : conférences organisées par la Société des anciens élèves et élèves de l'École libre des sciences politiques, Paris: libr. Félix Alcan, p. 296
- D'Armonnel (1933), L'Office des houillères sinistrées du Nord et du Pas-de-Calais et les charbons de réparations, preface by Henri de Peyerimhoff, Paris: impr.-édit. Jouve et Cie, p. 223
- Henri de Peyerimhoff de Fontenelle (1952), Les Médavy Grancey et le château de Médavy, Alençon: Impr. de Poulet-Malassis, p. 35
- Henri de Peyerimhoff de Fontenelle (1953), Remise à M. de Peyerimhoff de son épée de membre de l'Institut, Le Mesnil: Impr. de Firmin-Didot, p. 24
- Henri de Peyerimhoff de Fontenelle (1953), Notice sur la vie et les travaux de Raoul Dautry, Paris: impr. de Firmin-Didot / Académie des sciences morales et politiques

== Sources ==
- Boyce, Robert (2005-06-20), French Foreign and Defence Policy, 1918-1940: The Decline and Fall of a Great Power, Routledge, ISBN 978-1-134-74826-6
- Boyce, R. (2009-10-21), The Great Interwar Crisis and the Collapse of Globalization, Palgrave Macmillan UK, ISBN 978-0-230-28076-2
- Brunet, Luc-André (2017-06-08), Forging Europe: Industrial Organisation in France, 1940–1952, Springer, ISBN 978-1-349-95198-7
- Chatriot, Alain, "Henri de Peyerimhoff, figure du syndicalisme patronal de l'industrie houillère", Annales des Mines (in French)
- Douglas, Allen (1993-01-08), From Fascism to Libertarian Communism: George Valois Against the Third Republic, University of California Press, ISBN 978-0-520-91209-0
- Ehrmann, Henry Walter (2015-12-08), Organized Business in France, Princeton University Press, ISBN 978-1-4008-7832-1
- Fischer, Conan (2017-01-26), A Vision of Europe: Franco-German Relations during the Great Depression, 1929-1932, OUP Oxford, ISBN 978-0-19-166380-2
- Henri de Peyerimhoff de Fontenelle (1871-1953) (in French), BnF: Bibliotheque nationale de France
- Kuisel, Richard F. (1967), Ernest Mercier; French Technocrat, University of California Press, GGKEY:QEGX2YATZJQ
- Kuisel, Richard F. (1983-04-29), Capitalism and the State in Modern France: Renovation and Economic Management in the Twentieth Century, CUP Archive, ISBN 978-0-521-27378-7
- Nord, Philip (2012-08-26), France's New Deal: From the Thirties to the Postwar Era, Princeton University Press, ISBN 978-1-4008-3496-9
- Perry, M. (2011-01-19), Memory of War in France, 1914-45: Cesar Fauxbras, the Voice of the Lowly, Palgrave Macmillan UK, ISBN 978-0-230-29774-6
- Schmidt, Vivien A. (1996-04-26), "Building the dirigiste state (prior to 1981)", From State to Market?: The Transformation of French Business and Government, Cambridge University Press, ISBN 978-0-521-55553-1
