= Comité Central des Houillères de France =

French industrial lobby group

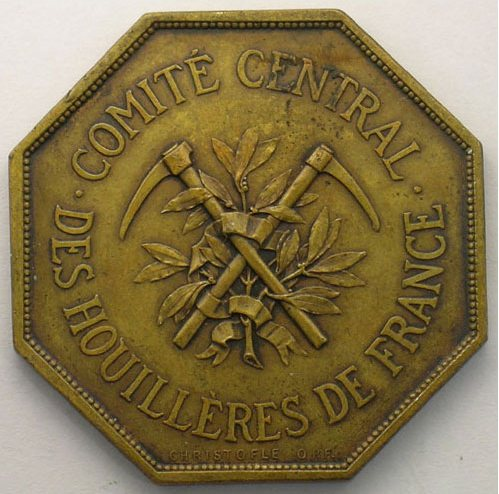
- 1924 numismatic by René Rozet
- Abbreviation: CCHF
- Predecessor: Comité des Houillères Françaises
- Successor: Comité d’organisation des combustibles minéraux solides
- Formation: March 10, 1887; 139 years ago
- Dissolved: November 9, 1940; 85 years ago
- Type: Lobby group
- Legal status: Defunct
- Purpose: Defend coalowners' interests
- Headquarters: 35 rue Saint-Dominique, 75007 Paris, France.
- Region served: France
- Official language: French

The Comité Central des Houillères de France (CCHF, Central Committee of Coalowners of France) was an industrial lobby group that represented the interests of the owners of coal mines. It was active between 1887 and 1940, when the Vichy government dissolved it and placed the coal industry under government control.

== Origins ==
A first attempt to unite the coalowners of the Loire region to defend their common interests was made in 1822, but did not last. The Union des Houillères françaises was formed in 1840 to promote the interests of the national mines and defend their common interests. It had a committee supported by a secretary in Paris who maintained records and responded to requests. The union also did not last long. The Comité des Houillères Françaises was organized from 1855 to 1869 by Amédée Burat (1809–83), a professor at the École Centrale Paris and consulting engineer to the Blanzy and Le Creusot mines. This committee provided a center for publications.

During the French Third Republic a period of prosperity for the coal mines ended after 1880 and the need for an industry organization reappeared. The Compagnie des Mines de la Loire set up a study committee on 1 July 1886 to review mining laws. Henry Darcy (1840–1926)^{(fr)}, president of the Châtillon-Commentry, Blanzy^{(fr)} and Dourges^{(fr)} companies, created the Comité Central des Houillères (CCHF) at the study committee's general assembly on 10 March 1887 through an expansion of that committee's powers. The purpose was to defend the interests of the French coal mining companies.

== History ==
The statutes of the CCHF were adopted in 1888 and provided for a president, permanent staff, secretary general, and a monthly meeting of all member companies with one representative per company. The head office was in Paris. It moved several times before 1897 when it was established at 55 rue de Chateaudun. In 1922 it moved to 35 rue Saint-Dominique, where it remained until the committee was dissolved in 1940. The statutes were modified in 1892, 1913, 1924 and 1931, but the general organization and objectives did not change. The committee had just two presidents: Henry Darcy from 1888 to 1925, then Henri de Peyerimhoff from 1925 to 1940. Under Peyerimhoff the committee had a staff of eighteen in Paris. The CCHF canvassed its members for subjects of interest, and circulated printed reports on laws and regulations, technical innovations, legal judgements in cases involving mining and so on.

The CCHF does not appear to have had the same influence on the coal industry as that of the Comité des forges on metallurgy. Its main role was to resist pressure from the government or the unions, and it did not have power over its own members. It was only in the 1930s that it began to resemble the German cartels, but the member companies still maintained their independence. The CCHF was particularly involved in revisions to the mining laws, where it was often able to influence parliament in its favour through discreet and carefully calculated influence on politicians and senior ministry staff. The CCHF occasionally used press campaigns to influence the public. It emerged that the CCHF and the Comite de Forges were managers of Le Temps, the most authoritative newspaper of the Third Republic.

After the 1940 defeat of France in World War II, the Vichy government targeted the CCHF, Comité de Forges and Confédération générale du patronat français (CGPF), three organizations closely identified with the grand patronat of France. The organizations were dissolved and their leaders were excluded from the successor organization committees. The decree dissolving the CCHF was issued by the Petain government on 9 November 1940, and another decree on the same date placed the mining industry under state control. The CCHF was replaced by the Comité d’organisation des combustibles minéraux solides. In 1944 the Director of Mines took over and supervised the nationalization of the coal mines and creation of the Charbonnages de France by law of 17 April 1946.

== Key people ==
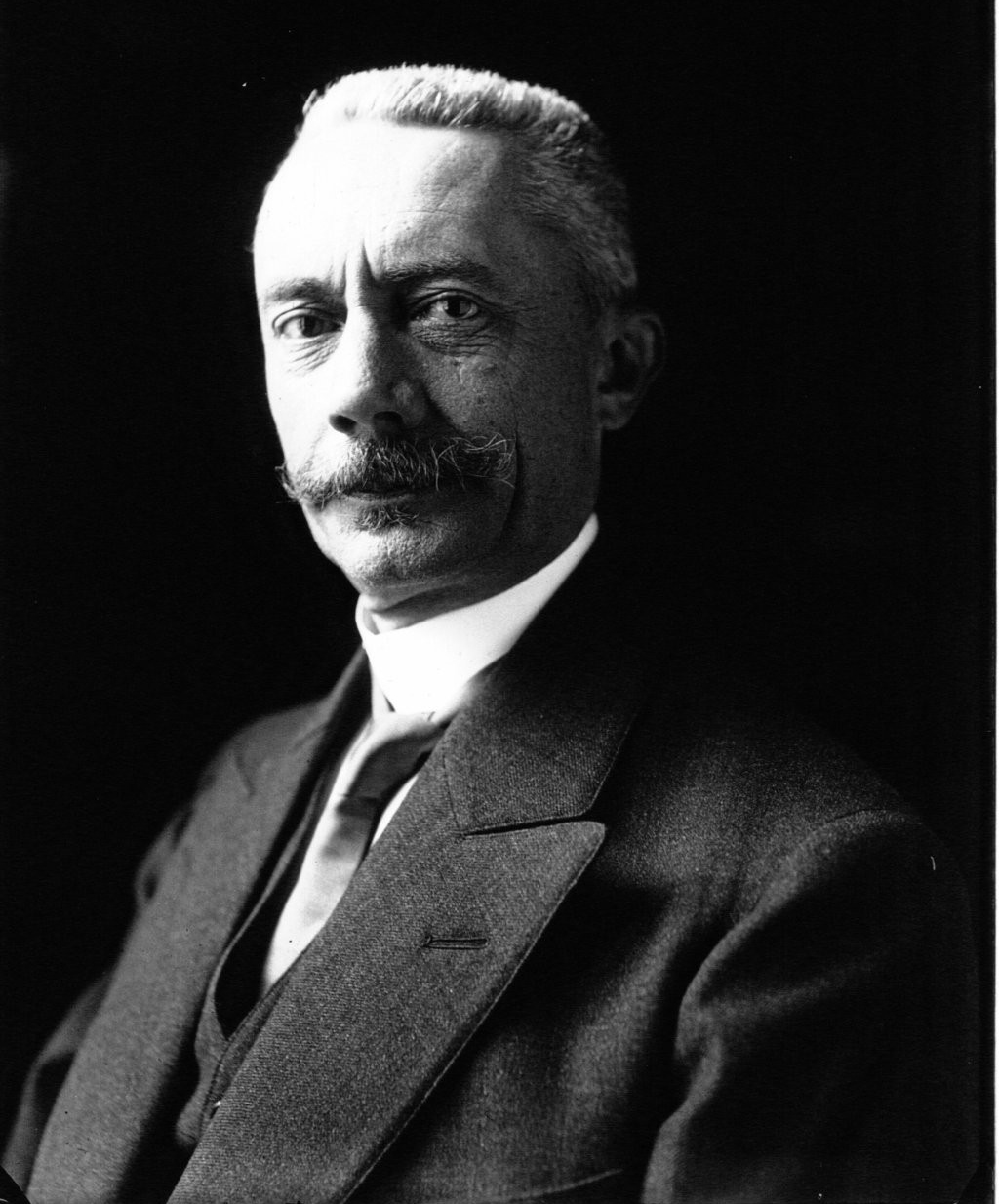
Jean Plichon, vice-president of the CCHF

Henry Darcy (1840–1926) started his career in 1863 in the Council of State, and was a prefect in several departments in 1873–77. He became chairman of the board of the Compagnie des Forges de Châtillon-Commentry et Neuves-Maisons in 1870, holding this office until his death. He was a member of the management committee of the Comité des Forges de France. In 1918 he was a co-founder of the Confédération générale de la production française.

In 1907 Henri de Peyerimhoff (1871–1953) was appointed Secretary General of the CCHF in place of Édouard Gruner, who now concentrated on technical subjects. Peyerimhoff was then in turn secretary general, vice president and from 1925 president of the committee until it was dissolved. In 1928 he wrote favorably about collective agreements in an article on Le Program Patronal in the Revue des Vivants. Peyerimhoff defended the collieries against electricity and steel interests. He was interested in subjects such as trade unionism, workers' housing, social care for workers' children and controlled recruitment of Polish workers for French mines.

- Henri Fayol (1841–1925) became a member of the CCHF in 1900. He was a member of the board of the Comité des forges and administrator of the Société de Commentry, Fourchambault et Decazeville. Fayol justified his use of the CCHF to lobby the government on principles of economic liberalism.
- Édouard Gruner (1849–1933), mining engineer and vice-president of the CCHF, was an active member of the Société d'économie sociale and secretary-treasurer of the Musée social.
- Jean Plichon (1863–1936) succeeded Léon Renard (1836–1916) as vice-president of the CCHF in the early 20th century.
- Louis Mercier (1856–1927) was a vice-president of the CCHF. He was CEO of the Mines de Béthune and a director of many mining and metallurgy companies and associations. He was president of the Société des ingénieurs civils de France.
- Baron René Reille (1835–1898) was a member of the CCHF and president of the board of directors of the Compagnie minière de Carmaux.
- Élie Reumaux (1838–1922)^{(fr)}, president of the Société des mines de Lens, was a vice-president of the CCHF.

== Member companies ==
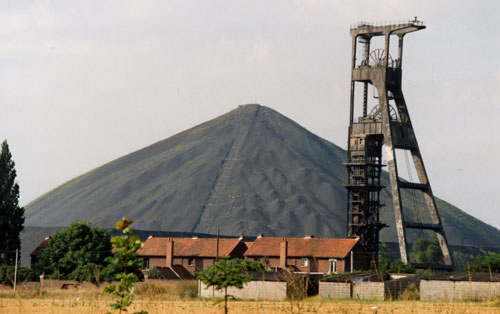
Slag heap at Bruay-la-Buissière

Founding companies (or their locations) were:

- Ahun
- Alès
- Aniche
- Anzin
- Azincourt
- Aubin
- Beaubrun
- Blanzy
- Bully-Grenay
- Bruay
- Bouquiès
- Carmaux
- Carvin
- Châtillon-Commentry et Neuves-Maisons
- Commentry-Fourchambault
- Le Creusot
- Courrières
- Decazeville
- Douchy
- Dourges
- l’Escarpelle^{(fr)}
- Épinac
- Ferfay
- La Grand-Combe
- Les Grandes Flaches
- Liévin
- Lens
- la Loire
- Marles
- Mokta el Hadid
- Meurchin
- Montrambert
- La Péronnière
- Portes et Sénéchas
- Rochebelle
- Rive-de-Gier
- Saint-Étienne
- Terrenoire
- Vicoigne^{(fr)}

No companies are known to have left the CCHF, although some disappeared through mergers and acquisitions. Most new French coal mining companies asked for admission. The 39 original companies rose to 100 in 1908 and 134 in 1934, then fell to 78 in 1938. Apart from the Société Mokta El Hadid, metal mines did not seek representation. From 1909 they had their own Chambre syndicale française des mines métalliques. The CCHF exchanged information with this organization and sometimes worked with it in public actions.

== Publications ==
=== Comité des Houillères Françaises ===
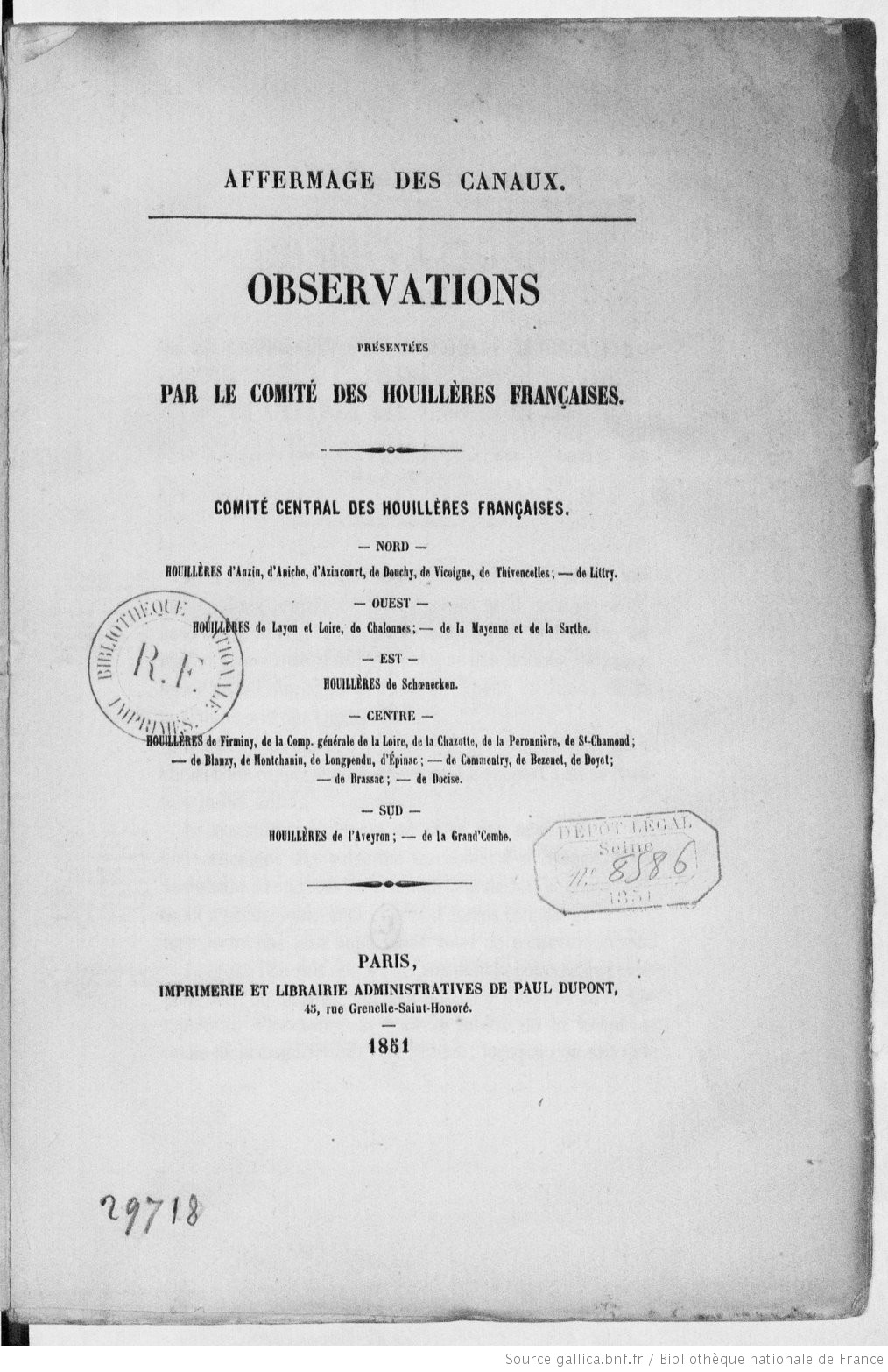
Cover page of Affermage des canaux (1851)

Publications by this committee included:

- Affermage des canaux. Observations présentées par le Comité des Houillères françaises, Paris: Imp. et Lib.. de Paul Dupont, Comité des Houillères Françaises, 1851
- Giuseppe-Antonio Borgnis (1852), Observations sur l'extraction et le commerce des houilles en Belgique, Paris: Impr. Gustave Gratiot, Comité des Houillères Françaises
- Sur l'importation des houilles prussiennes, Paris: Comité des Houillères Françaises, 1852
- Comité des houillères. Analyse des articles de la loi du 21 avril 1810 réglant les redevances des mines et le droit de surveillance de l'état sur l'exploitation, Paris: imp. de G. Gratiot, Comité des Houillères Françaises, 1853
- Les droits d'octroi imposés à la houille (Observations présentées à M. le préfet de la Seine et à MM. les membres du conseil municipal de Paris), Paris: imp. de G. Gratiot, Comité des Houillères Françaises, 1853
- Observations présentées sur les réunions de concessions et sur la propriété des mines, Paris: imp. de G. Gratiot, Comité des Houillères Françaises, 1853
- Observations présentées sur l'organisation et les tarifs de la navigation intérieure, Paris: imp. de Gustave Gratiot, Comité des Houillères Françaises, 1853
- Coup d'oeil sur la situation de l'industrie houillère, Paris: imp. de A. Guyot et Scribe, Comité des Houillères Françaises, 1854
- Note sur l'importation des houilles Prussiennes et sur la nécessité de réduire les tarifs du canal du Rhône au Rhin, Paris: imp. de A. Guyot et Scribe, Comité des Houillères Françaises, 1854
- Note sur quelques mesures administratives nécessaires pour abaisser le prix de revient des houilles, Paris: imp. de A. Guyot et Scribe, Comité des Houillères Françaises, 1855
- Nouvelles observations sur l'établissement des redevances proportionnelles des mines, Paris: imp. de A. Guyot et Scribe, Comité des Houillères Françaises, 1855
- Analyse des articles de la loi du 21 avril 1810 réglant la propriété des mines, les redevances proportionnelles et les conditions de la surveillance des travaux, Paris: imp. de A. Guyot et Scribe, Comité des Houillères Françaises, 1856
- Législation des mines, Paris: Comité des Houillères Françaises, 1857
- De l'indemnité due au propriétaire de la surface du sol, dans le cas de dommages causés par les travaux souterrains d'Exploitations, Paris: imp. de A. Guyot et Scribe, Comité des Houillères Françaises, 1857
- Redevances proportionnelles des Mines. (Janvier 1858), Paris: Comité des Houillères Françaises, 1858
- A sa majesté Napoléon III, empereur des Français (Mémoire à l'appui de la demande en réduction des tarifs de la navigation intérieure présentée à sa majesté l'empereur par le Comité des houillères françaises), Paris: Impr. de A. Guyot et Scribe, Comité des Houillères Françaises, 1858
- Dissertation sur l'indemnité due par l'exploitant des mines au propriétaire de la surface pour les dommages causés par les travaux souterrains de l'exploitation des mines, Paris: imp. de A. Guyot et Scribe, Comité des Houillères Françaises, 1858
- Redevance proportionnelle des mines. Question soumise au conseil d'Etat par la mine de Noeux (Pas-de-Calais), Paris: imp. de A. Guyot et Scribe / Comité des Houillères Françaises, 1859
- Note sur l'importation des houilles étrangères en France, Paris: imp. de A. Guyot, Comité des Houillères Françaises, 1859
- Pétition adressée à Sa Majesté l'Empereur (Signée : les Délégués des Houillères françaises, Paris: imp. de A. Guyot et Scribe, Comité des Houillères Françaises, 1860
- Dissertation sur l'indemnité due par l'exploitant de mines au propriétaire de la surface., Paris: imp. de Guyot et Scribe, Comité des Houillères Françaises, 1860
- Mines. Dommages à la surface. Occupation du sol. Travaux souterrains (Novembre 1860), Paris: imp. de A. Guyot et Scribe, Comité des Houillères Françaises, 1860
- Navigation intérieure de la France. Suppression des droits de navigation, amélioration des canaux et des rivières, Paris: imp. de A. Guyot et Scribe, Comité des Houillères Françaises, 1860
- Note sur la nécessité de maintenir les tarifs protecteurs, imp. de A. Guyot et Scribe, Comité des Houillères Françaises, 1860
- Note sur la redevance proportionnelle des mines, Paris: imp. de A. Guyot et Scribe, Comité des Houillères Françaises, 1860
- Note sur le projet du conseil de la Sarre, Paris: imp. de A. Guyot et Scribe, Comité des Houillères Françaises, 1860
- Comité des houillères Françaises, Paris: Comité des Houillères Françaises, 1860
- Comité des houillères françaises, Paris: imp. de A. Guyot, Comité des Houillères Françaises, 1860
- Navigation intérieure de la France. Amélioration des rivières et des canaux, Paris: imp. de A. Guyot et Scribe, Comité des Houillères Françaises, 1861
- Fabrication du Coke. Décisions du tribunal de Charleroi. (16 avril 1859). De la cour de Bruxelles (20 juin 1860). Et du tribunal de 1ere instance de Paris, Paris: Imp. de A. Guyot et Scribe, Comité des Houillères Françaises, 1861
- Cour de cassation, chambres réunies. Audiences des 22 et 23 juillet 1862. Présidence de M. Nicias Gaillard, Paris: imp. de Guyot et Scribe, Comité des Houillères Françaises, 1862, p. 99
- Pétition au sénat pour l'exécution d'un canal latéral à la Loire de Chatillon à l'embouchure de la Maine, Paris: imp. de A. Guyot et Scribe / Comité des Houillères Françaises, 1862
- Édouard Dalloz (1864), L'article 11 de la loi des mines du 21 avril 1810. Discussion, Précédée d'une introduction de Am. Burat, Paris: impr. de A. Guyot et Scribe, Comité des Houillères Françaises, p. 24
- Note sur les accidents des mines, Paris: imp. de A. Guyot et Scribe, Comité des Houillères Françaises, 1868
- Les Grèves en 1870, Paris: Imp. de A. Hennuyer, Comité des Houillères Françaises, 1870

=== Comité central des houillères de France ===
Publications by this committee included:

- Louis Ricard (1891), Questions législatives. Chambre des Députés. Session de 1891, Bar-le-Duc: impr. de Constant-Laguerre, Comité central des houillères de France, p. 31
- Compte rendu des travaux de la Commission prussienne des éboulements, Paris: Comité central des houillères de France, 1905, p. 684
- Règlements sur les mines de l'Oberbergamt de Dortmund, translated by Paul Sainte-Claire Deville, Paris: Comité central des houillères de France, 1907
- Jacques Taffanel (1909), Station d'essais de Liévin. Essais sur les appareils respiratoires à oxygène comprimé et régénération, Paris: Comité central des houillères de France, p. 72
- Projet de règlement général sur l'exploitation des mines, Comité central des houillères de France, 1909
- Jacques Taffanel (1921), Station d'essais de Liévin. 6e série d'essais sur les inflammations de poussières, Paris: Dunod, Comité central des houillères de France, p. 120
- M. G. Coquelu, ed. (1925), Barème Clerget pour le cubage des bois de mine, Montceau-les-Mines (Saône-et-Loire): Comité central des houillères de France, p. 120
- Statut des délégués mineurs, Paris: Impr. de Publications périodiques. Comité central des houillères de France, 1938, p. 12

== See also ==
- Union des Mines

== Sources ==
- Allain, Odile (1972), Comité Central des Houillères de France (PDF) (in French), Archives nationales
- Brunet, Luc-André (2017-06-08), Forging Europe: Industrial Organisation in France, 1940–1952, Springer, ISBN 978-1-349-95198-7
- Chatriot, Alain, "Henri de Peyerimhoff, figure du syndicalisme patronal de l'industrie houillère", Annales des Mines (in French)
- Comité central des houillères de France (in French), BnF: Bibliotheque nationale de France
- Ehrmann, Henry Walter (2015-12-08), Organized Business in France, Princeton University Press, ISBN 978-1-4008-7832-1
- "Fayol, Henri", Patrons de France (in French)
- Goldberg, Harvey (1962), The Life of Jean Jaurès, Univ of Wisconsin Press, ISBN 978-0-299-02564-9
- "Mercier, Louis", Patrons de France (in French)
- Peaucelle, Jean-Louis (2015-07-22), Henri Fayol, the Manager, Routledge, ISBN 978-1-317-31939-9
- Przybyla, Francis (2007-08-07), Le Blé, le sucre et le charbon: Les parlementaires du Nord et leur action 1881–1889 (in French), Presses Univ. Septentrion, ISBN 978-2-85939-980-1
- "Reumaux, Elie", Patrons de France (in French)
- Savoye, Antoine (1988), "Paul de Rousiers, sociologue et praticien du syndicalisme", Cahiers Georges Sorel (in French), 6 (1)
