= Édouard Laferrière =

French lawyer and authority in administrative law

Édouard Louis Julien Laferrière
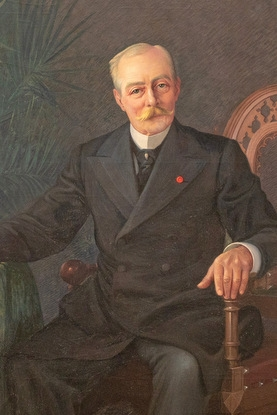
- Édouard Laferrière

Vice-President of the Council of State
- In office 1886 – July 1898
- Preceded by: Charles Ballot^{(fr)}
- Succeeded by: Georges Coulon

Governor General of Algeria
- In office 26 July 1898 – 3 October 1900
- Preceded by: Louis Lépine
- Succeeded by: Charles Jonnart (acting) then Paul Révoil

Public Prosecutor at the Court of Cassation
- In office 3 October 1900 – 2 July 1901
- Preceded by: Jean-Pierre Manau
- Succeeded by: Manuel-Achille Baudouin^{(fr)}

Personal details
- Born: 26 August 1841 Angoulême, Charente, France
- Died: 2 July 1901 (aged 59) Bourbonne-les-Bains, Haute-Marne, France
- Occupation: Lawyer, administrator

Édouard Louis Julien-Laferrière (26 August 1841 – 2 July 1901) was a French lawyer and authority in administrative law who held various senior administrative positions during the French Third Republic. He wrote a treatise on administrative law that defined the basis for modern French administrative law. He was appointed Governor-General of Algeria during a crisis in 1898, and established an elected advisory assembly with little real power. He encouraged southward expansion into the Sahara.

== Life ==
=== Early years (1841–70) ===
Édouard Laferrière was born in Angoulême on 26 August 1841. His parents were Louis Firmin Julien-Laferrière (1798–1861) and Jeanne Elisabeth Elise Lajarthe (1811–1875). His father was an advocate in Angoulême, then Bordeaux, professor at Rennes (1838), Inspector General of Faculties of Law (1846), Councilor of State (1849) and Rector of Toulouse (1854). His father was a professor of administrative law at the Faculty of Paris.

Edouard Laferrière became an advocate at the Paris Bar in 1864. He was a liberal, and opposed the authoritarianism of Napoleon III. He believed in the ideals of the French Revolution of 1789 and in positivism, and wanted a republic that would be a force for change but not for upheaval. He was editor of Rappel in 1869, and founded La Loi in 1870.

=== Council of State (1870–98) ===
After the fall of the Second French Empire Laferrière was named Master of Requests and Government Commissioner in the provisional commission that replaced the Council of State. When the Council of State was reconstituted on 24 May 1872 he was confirmed in his position. For some time he was Director General of Religious Administration. After the reorganization of the Council of State in 1879 he was named President of the Litigation Section.

As president of the litigation section he had great influence on administrative jurisprudence. In this position he developed the classification and definitions of types of litigation. From 1883 to 1884 he gave a course at the Paris Faculty of Law on Administrative Jurisdiction and Litigation. This was the basis for his Treatise of Administrative Jurisdiction and Litigation (1887), which in turn is the basis of modern French administrative law. He defined four bases for litigation: Abuse of power; Full litigation, where the judge may modify or replace the administrative act and impose damages; Legality and Repression.

On 9 October 1884 he married Marguerite Elise Joséphine Guy (1860–1929) in Paris. Their daughter Elise was born in 1885. In 1886 he was named Vice President of the Council of State. He held this office until July 1898, when he was appointed Governor General of Algeria.

=== Algeria (1898–1900) ===
Laferrière took office as Governor General of Algeria on 26 July 1898. He was appointed at a time when the colony was experiencing a wave of antisemitism and serious financial difficulties. He took Henri de Peyerimhoff from the litigation section of the Council of State as head of his civil cabinet, but in July 1900 Peyerimhoff was called back to Paris by Georges Coulon, the new Vice-President of the Conseil d’Etat, and attached to the Interior section. When he arrived in Algeria Laferrière had great difficulty with Max Régis, the antisemitic mayor of Algiers, whom he dismissed.

The Délégations financières algériennes was created in August 1898, an elected assembly to advise the government. It had 24 representatives of colons (French agricultural settlers), 24 of non-colons (French merchants, manufacturers and workers), and 21 of indigenous people. Laferrière followed the advice of Camille Sabatier^{(fr)} in including 6 Kabyles among the indigenous people, the others being Arabs. The measure gave limited political rights to the local people, but did not give them any real power.

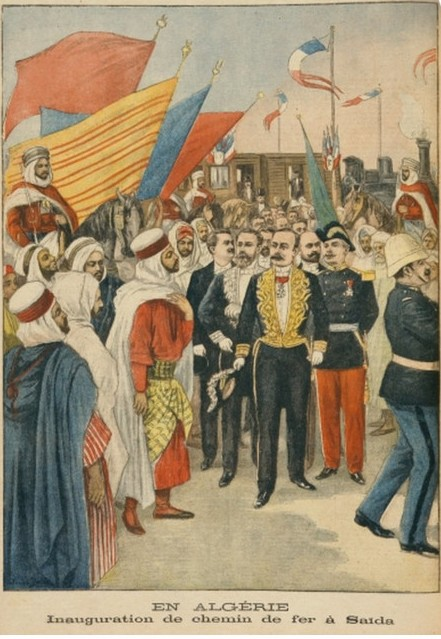
Laferrière at the opening of the Saida railway in Algeria, 1900

In August 1899 the French penetrated the Oued Zouzfana. In September the French government authorized extension of the narrow gauge military railway that was being built from Aïn Séfra to Djenien bou Rezg to be extended to Zoubia, only 10 kilometres (6.2 mi) from the Zousfana. Laferrière said "We will not have to do any more than to cross the pass which separates that region from that of the oued Zousfana in order to insure our Saharan penetration in that direction and an easy access towards the populous oases of the Tuat".

In December 1899 a French scientific mission encountered a large group of armed Saharan people in the Tidikelt^{(fr)}. The mission's military escort chose to fight, quickly routed the Saharans, and occupied the In Salah oasis. It has been said that Laferrière deliberately provoked the incident. Certainly he wanted an excuse to extend French influence. A poorly managed military campaign ensued in 1900, meeting little resistance but suffering greatly from heat and lack of water over the summer, with huge losses of camels. Part of the problem was lack of cooperation between Laferrière and General Crisot of the 19th Army Corps. Laferrière resigned from his position as Governor General. He was replaced by Charles Célestin Jonnart, Deputy of Pas-de-Calais, as Acting Governor General on 3 October 1900.

=== Last years (1900–1901) ===
In 1900 Laferrière was appointed Public Prosecutor at the Court of Cassation. Laferrière died on 2 July 1901 in Bourbonne-les-Bains, Haute-Marne, at the age of 59.

== Publications ==
Publications by Édouard Laferrière include:

- Édouard Laferrière (1864), (De Vi et de vi armata (Dig. 43,16). De la possession requise pour prescrire...) (Thèse pour la licence... 24-08-1864), Paris: impr E. Thunot, p. 143
- Édouard Laferrière (1865), Les Journalistes devant le Conseil d'État, Paris: Vve Joubert, p. 29
- Édouard Laferrière (1866), Rivalité des Parlements avec les intendants et le Conseil du Roi (discours prononcé à l'ouverture de la Conférence des avocats, le 8 décembre 1866), Paris: A. Lacroix, Verboeckhoven et Cie, p. 47
- Édouard Laferrière (1867), La Censure et le régime correctionnel (étude sur la presse contemporaine), précédée d'une lettre de M. Pelletan à M. Ernest Picard sur la liberté de la presse, Paris: A. Le Chevalier, p. 322
- Édouard Laferrière (1869), Les constitutions d'Europe et d'Amérique, Paris: Cotillon / Anselme Batbie, p. 656
- Édouard Laferrière (1871), La Loi organique départementale du 10 août 1871 : conseils généraux, commissions départementales (texte officiel annoté par M. É. Laferrière), Paris: Cotillon et fils, p. 92
- Édouard Laferrière (1881), L'Article 8 de la Constitution, interprétation de la clause de révision, Paris: A. Cotillon, p. 43
- Édouard Laferrière (1896), Traité de la juridiction administrative et des recours contentieux, Paris: Berger-Levrault
- Édouard Laferrière (1899), Gouvernement général de l'Algérie. (Discours prononcés à l'ouverture des Délégations financières le 6 novembre 1899 et à l'ouverture du Conseil supérieur du gouvernement le 11 décembre 1899), Algiers: impr. de P. Fontana, p. 41
- Édouard Laferrière (1999), Édouard Laferrière, Paris: Presses universitaires de France / Pascale Gonod, p. 300

== See also ==
- Boulevard Mohamed-Khemisti in Algiers, formerly named after Laferrière

== Sources ==
- Belmessous, Saliha (2013-03-21), Assimilation and Empire: Uniformity in French and British Colonies, 1541-1954, OUP Oxford, ISBN 978-0-19-957916-7
- Chatriot, Alain, "Henri de Peyerimhoff, figure du syndicalisme patronal de l'industrie houillère", Annales des Mines (in French)
- Delpard, Raphaël (2012-05-09), Ils ont vécu dans l'Algérie en guerre (in French), Archipel, ISBN 978-2-8098-0734-9
- Edouard Laferrière (in French), Conseil d'État
- Édouard Laferrière (1841-1901) (in French), BnF: Bibliotheque nationale de France
- Garric, Alain, "Edouard JULIEN-LAFERRIÈRE", Geneanet (in French)
- Gonod, Pascale (1992), Edouard laferriere, un juriste au service de la republique (in French), Paris 1
- "Les quatre types de contentieux administratif", vie-publique.fr (in French), Direction de l'Information Légale et Administrative, 5 June 2013
- Noémie, G (30 September 2013), "La classification des recours contentieux selon Edouard Laferrière", Doc du Juriste (in French)
- Roche, Sylviane (1997), Le temps des cerises: roman, TheBookEdition, ISBN 978-2-9535636-0-3
- Trout, Frank E. (1969), Morocco's Saharan Frontiers, Librairie Droz, ISBN 978-2-600-04495-0
