= Église de la Madeleine (Aix-en-Provence) =

Coordinates: 43.5294°N 5.4516°E

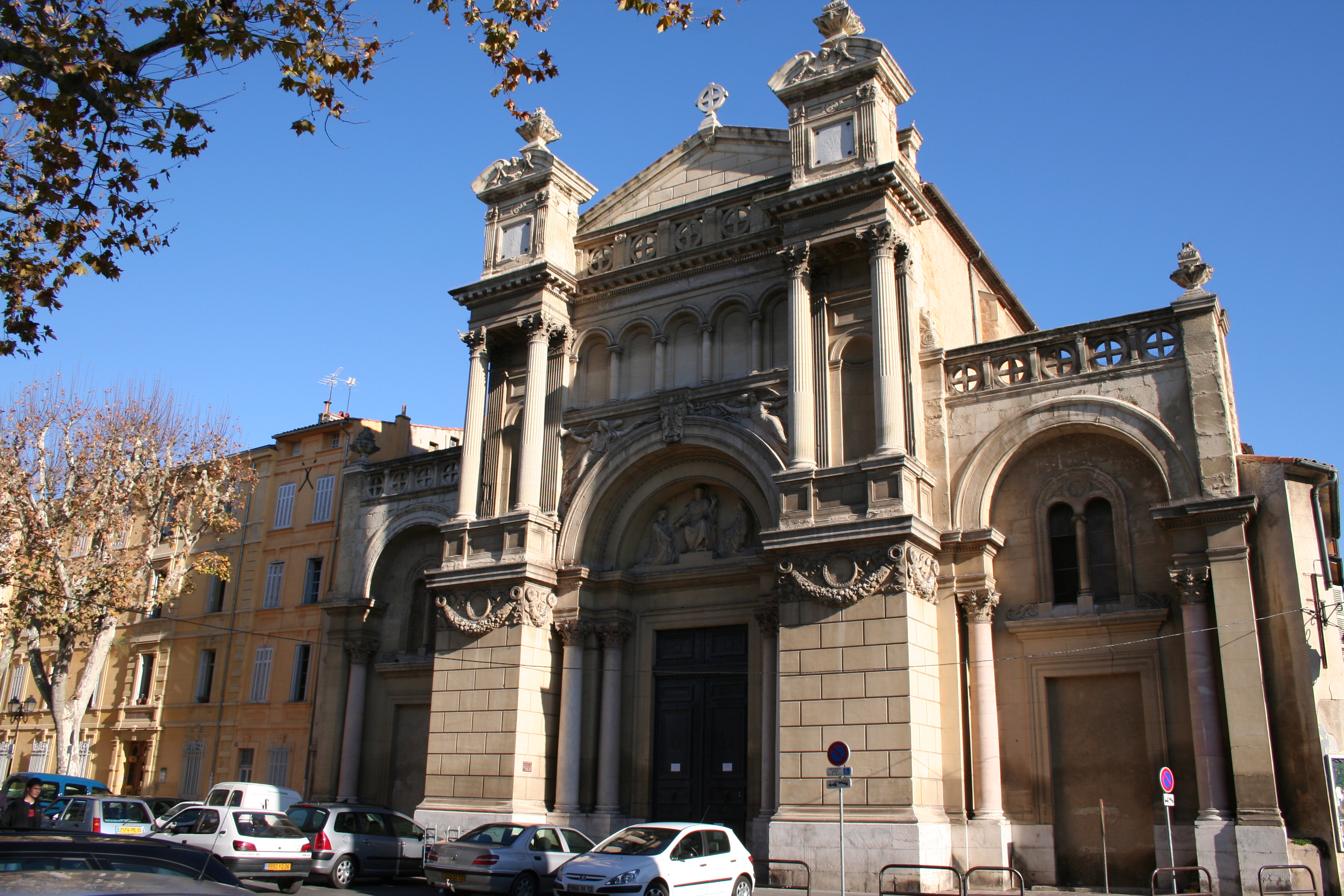
- Facade of the Église de la Madeleine
- Église de la Madeleine
- Location: Aix-en-Provence; Bouches-du-Rhône, Provence-Alpes-Côte d'Azur
- Country: France
- Denomination: Roman Catholic
- Tradition: Dominican Order

History
- Founded: 13th century

Architecture
- Heritage designation: Monument historique
- Architect(s): Laurent Vallon; Henri Révoil
- Style: Gothic architecture Second Empire architecture

Administration
- Archdeaconry: Roman Catholic Archdiocese of Aix

Clergy
- Archbishop: Christophe Dufour

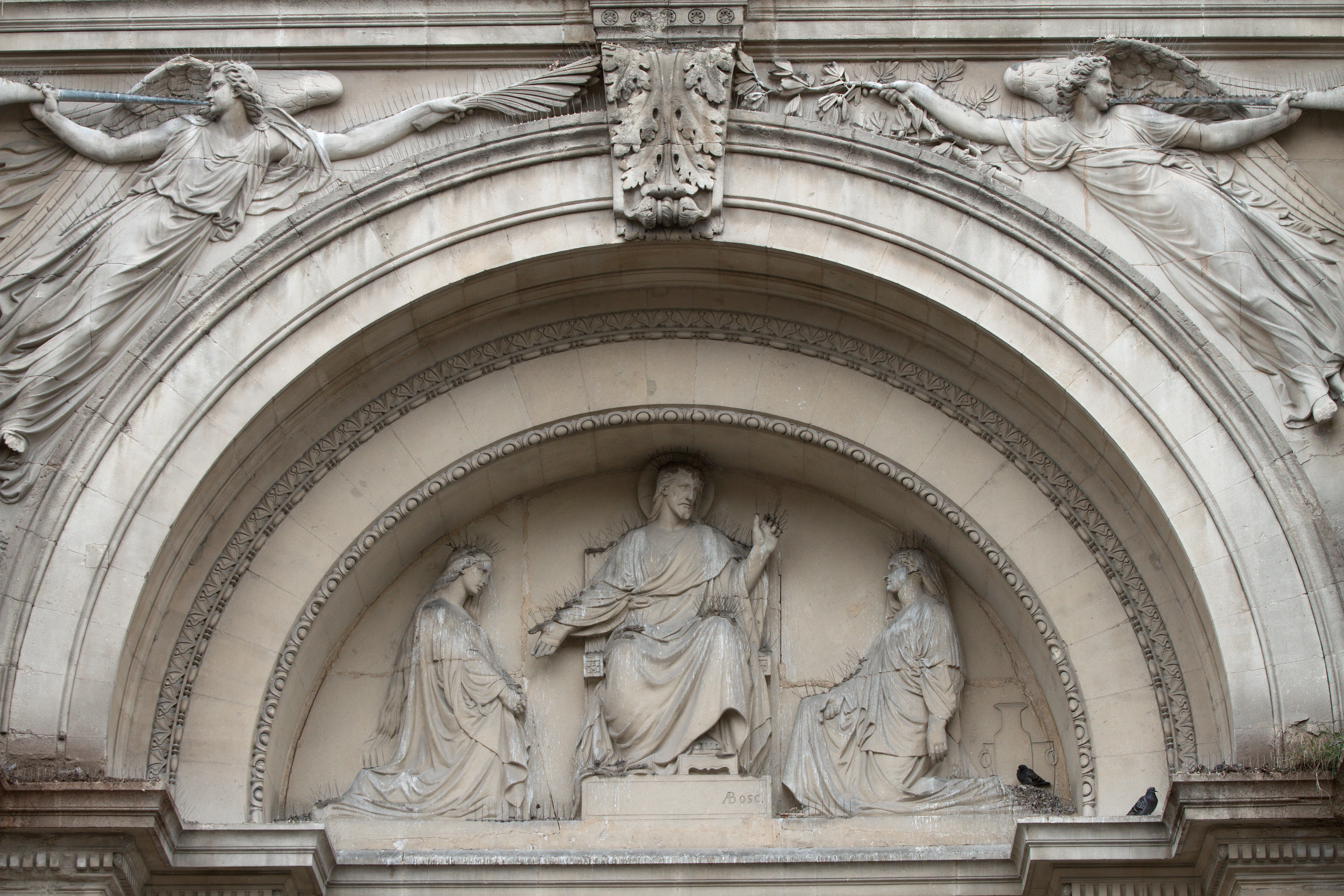
Close-up of the lunette sculpted by Henri Révoil above the main door

The Église de la Madeleine is a Roman Catholic church in Aix-en-Provence.

== Location ==
It is located on the town square of Place des Prêcheurs in Aix-en-Provence. It is next door to the Couvent des Prêcheurs, now a secondary school, also listed.

== History ==
A convent of the Dominican Order and a Gothic church was built in the 13th century on the Place des Prêcheurs. However, it was burned down in 1383. It was rebuilt, but came down in 1465. The current church building was constructed in its place in the seventeenth century. It was designed by architect Laurent Vallon (1652-1724), and it was built from 1691 to 1703. The facade was designed by architect Henri Révoil (1822-1900) from 1855 to 1860, and it serves as an example of Second Empire architecture. It was renamed in honour of Mary Magdalene in 1822.

Over the centuries, a number of renowned figures have been baptised in this church. On July 21, 1535, the son of François de Malherbe (1555–1628), also named François de Malherbe, was baptised in the church. A century later, André Campra (1660–1744) was baptised here on December 3, 1660. Eighteen years later, Gaspard de Gueidan (1688-1767) was also baptised in the church. Additionally, a century later, Louis-Charles-Jean-Baptiste Michel, who served as Bishop of Fréjus and Toulon from 1829 to 1845, was baptised in the church on July 12, 1761. More recently, the painter Paul Cézanne (1839-1906) was also baptised in this church.

Emmanuel de Fonscolombe (1810-1875) served as a chapel master.

The church has a fair amount of art pieces. For example, paintings inside the church include: La mort de St.Joseph by Jean-Baptiste van Loo (1684–1745), Madeleine chez Simon by Michel Serre (1658-1733), La nativité de Jésus by Pierre Mignard (1612-1695), Annunciation Tryptych by Barthélemy d'Eyck (c. 1420–after 1470), and Le Martyre de Saint-Paul by Théodore Beyermann. There are also paintings by Joseph-Marie Vien (1716-1809) and Jean Daret (1613–1668).

The pipe organ, designed by Jean-Esprit Isnard (1707-1781), dates back to 1743. Additionally, it is listed.

The church building was damaged by the 1909 Provence earthquake on June 11, 1909.

== At present ==
It has been closed for refurbishment since 2006. It will reopen in 2014. The paintings inside are temporarily housed in an air-conditioned warehouse in Marseille for the duration of the refurbishment of the church.

== Heritage significance ==
It has been listed as a Monument historique since October 24, 1988.
