= Jean-Baptiste Abel =

French politician

Jean-Baptiste Eugène Abel
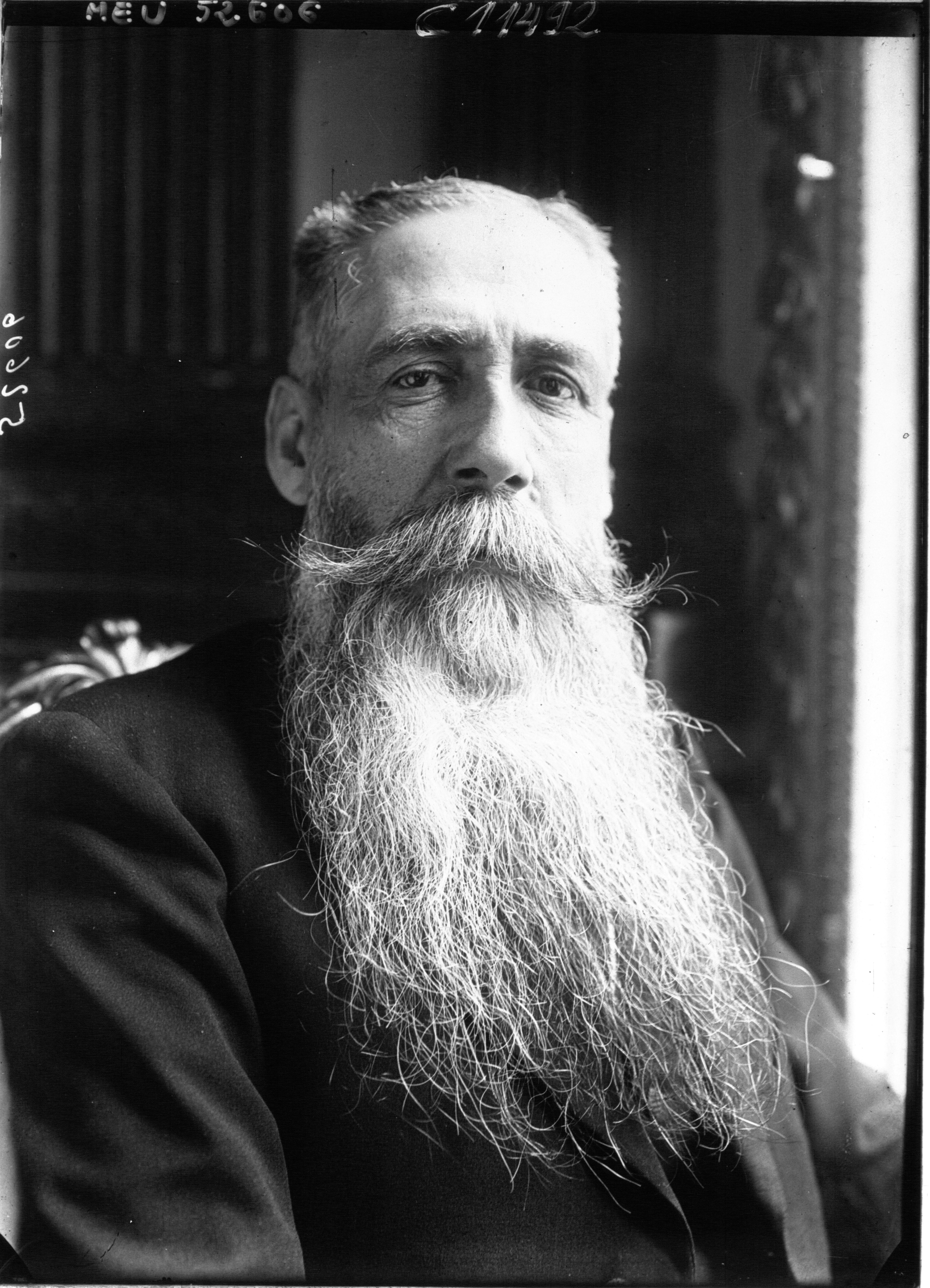
- Abel in 1914

Minister of Labor and Social Welfare
- In office 9 June 1914 – 13 June 1914
- Prime Minister: Alexandre Ribot
- Preceded by: Albert Métin
- Succeeded by: Maurice Couyba

Governor-General of Algeria
- In office 31 July 1919 – 31 August 1921
- Preceded by: Charles Jonnart
- Succeeded by: Théodore Steeg

Personal details
- Born: 12 January 1863 Toulon, France
- Died: 30 September 1921 (aged 58) Toulon, France
- Occupation: Lawyer

Jean-Baptiste Eugène Abel (12 January 1863 – 30 September 1921) was a French politician who was briefly Minister of Labor and Social Welfare, and later was Governor-General of Algeria.

== Early years ==
Jean-Baptiste Eugène Abel was born in Toulon on 12 January 1863. His father, Alphonse Abel, proclaimed the Republic in Toulon on 5 September 1870, and was interim mayor of the city. Jean-Baptiste Abel attended the Lycée de Toulon, then studied law and became an advocate in Toulon. In 1891 he was elected in a by-election to the General Council of the Var department representing Toulon West. He retained his seat in the departmental elections the next year, and in 1893 became vice-president of the council.

== Deputy ==
Abel ran successfully for election on the Radical platform as national deputy for the 1st district of Toulon in the general elections of August–September 1893. After taking his seat he was particularly involved in marine questions. He was appointed secretary of the chamber from 12 January 1897 to the end of the legislature. He ran again in the general election of 8–22 May 1898 but was defeated. He was appointed counselor to the Riom court of appeal, and then to the Nîmes court of appeal, holding this position for the next ten years.

Abel ran again in the general elections of April–May 1910 as national deputy for the 1st district of Toulon, and was elected. He was again involved in marine issues, and was a member of the marine committee. He was reelected in the April–May 1914 general elections, and was appointed Minister of Labor and Social Welfare in the short-lived cabinet of Alexandre Ribot, holding office from 9–13 June 1914. He was elected vice-president of the chamber in November 1915. In a debate that began on 13 March 1919 he argued that the fortifications in Paris and elsewhere were obsolete, saying, "Today, the dogma of the inviolability of fortifications has fallen in the face of the all-too-painful lessons of the last war."

== Governor of Algeria ==
In July 1919 Abel accepted the post of Governor-General of Algeria from Prime Minister Georges Clemenceau, holding this office while remaining a deputy. The appointment, effective 31 July 1919, was temporary. He resigned as vice-president of the chamber on 5 August 1919. He was reelected as deputy in the general elections of 16 November 1919. He now appeared in the chamber only to represent the government on discussions about Algeria.

Abel replaced Charles Jonnart as governor-general. Jonnart had enacted a law that gave many Algerians the right to obtain French citizenship. However, they had to abandon traditional customs such as polygamy to qualify, and most refused. From 1919 to 1923 there were only 317 requests for citizenship by Algerian veterans, of which 115 were rejected. In 1920 Abel said that France must admit Algerians into their national structure, or "beware lest they do not soon create one for themselves."

The colony was unsettled due to the effects of World War I (1914–18) followed by poor harvests. He was unable to solve these problems, but remained in Algeria until 31 August 1921, when he returned to Toulon in deteriorating health. He died in Toulon on 30 September 1921 aged 58.

== Sources ==
- Jolly, Jean (1977). "Jean-Baptiste, Eugène ABEL". Dictionnaire des parlementaires français de 1889 à 1940.
- Oulebsir, Nabila (2004). Les usages du patrimoine: monuments, musées et politique coloniale en Algérie, 1830-1930. Les Editions de la MSH. ISBN 978-2-7351-1006-3.
- Panchasi, Roxanne (2009). Future Tense: The Culture of Anticipation in France Between the Wars. Cornell University Press. p. 59. ISBN 978-0-8014-4670-2.
- Schweikart, Larry; Dougherty, Dave (2012-10-11). A Patriot's History® of the Modern World, Vol. I: From America's Exceptional Ascent to the Atomic Bomb: 1898-1945. Penguin Publishing Group. ISBN 978-1-101-60168-6.
- Spickard, Paul (2005-07-08). Race and Nation: Ethnic Systems in the Modern World. Routledge. ISBN 978-1-135-93060-8.
