= Socialism with no doctrine =

"Socialism with no doctrine" (French: socialisme sans doctrine) is a phrase coined by Albert Métin based on his observation of the experiments in labour and economic regulation by the nonsocialist governments of Australia and New Zealand that Métin described as effectively being a form of state socialism, although these policies did not contain any reference recognizing socialist theory. Métin wrote the book Socialisme sans doctrine (1901) that described this phenomenon and described these experiments undertaken in Australia and New Zealand to an audience in Paris that included future Prime Minister of France Alexandre Millerand in the audience.
