= Levier =

Levier L'Vi (Arpitan)
- Commune
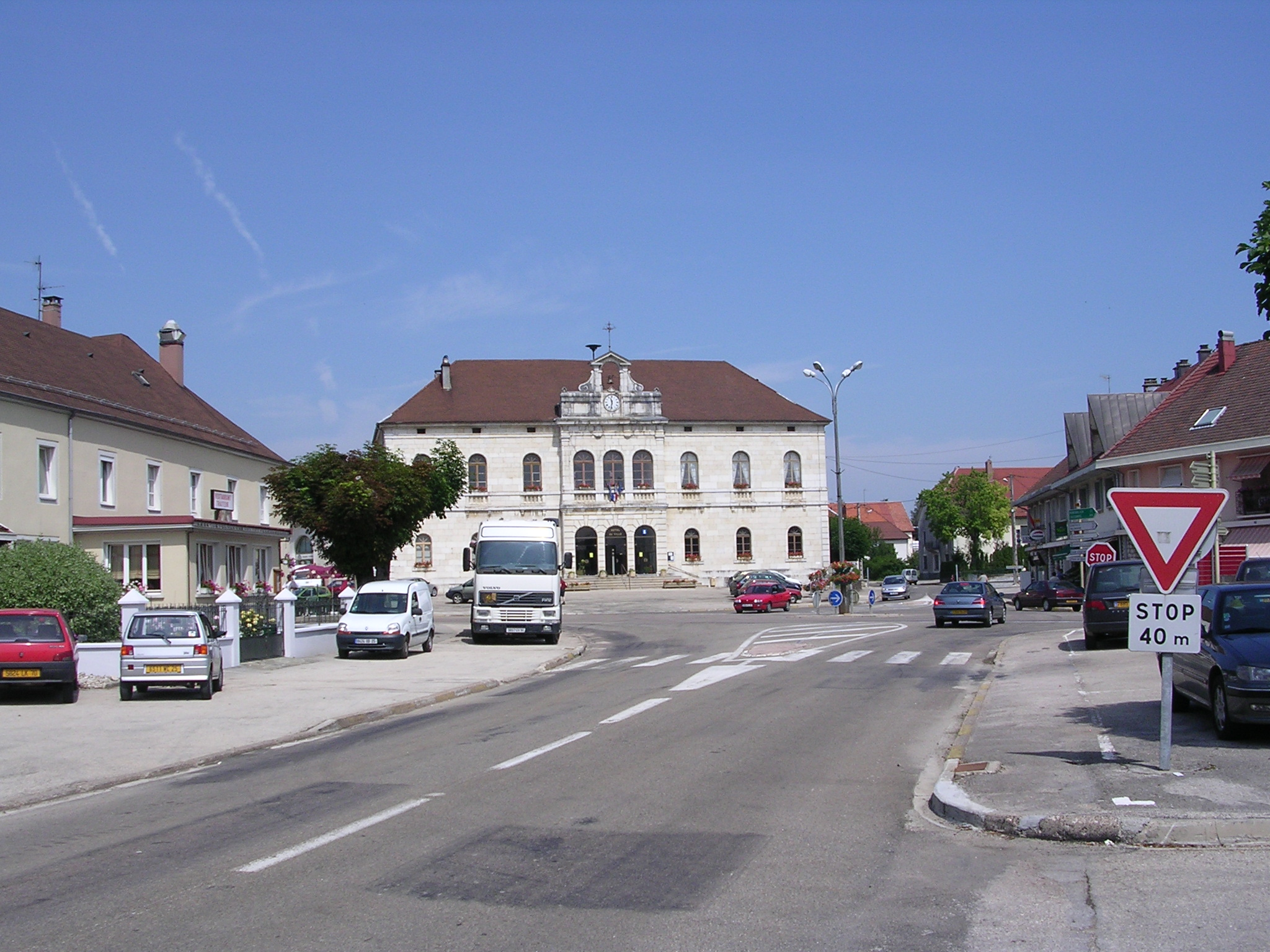
- Town center
- Location of Levier
- Location within France Location within Bourgogne-Franche-Comté
- Coordinates: 46°57′15″N 6°07′10″E
- Country: France
- Region: Bourgogne-Franche-Comté
- Department: Doubs
- Arrondissement: Pontarlier
- Canton: Frasne
- Intercommunality: Altitude 800

Government
  - Mayor (2020–2026): Marc Saulnier
- Area^{1}: 44.34 km^{2} (17.12 sq mi)
- Highest elevation: 901 m (2,956 ft)
- Lowest elevation: 679 m (2,228 ft)
- Population (2023): 2,400
  - Density: 54/km^{2} (140/sq mi)
- Time zone: UTC+01:00 (CET)
  - Summer (DST): UTC+02:00 (CEST)
- INSEE/Postal code: 25334 /25270
- ^{1} French Land Register data, which excludes lakes, ponds, glaciers > 1 km^{2} (0.386 sq mi or 247 acres) and river estuaries.

Levier (French pronunciation: [ləvje]; Arpitan: L'Vi) is a commune in the Doubs department in the Bourgogne-Franche-Comté region in eastern France. On 1 January 2017, the former commune of Labergement-du-Navois was merged into Levier.

== Geography ==
Levier is located 20 km (12 mi) from Pontarlier, 45 km (28 mi) from Besançon, and 14 km (8.7 mi) from the TGV station at Frasne.

== Population ==
Population data refer to the commune in its geography as of January 2025.

Historical population
Year	Pop.	±% p.a.
1968	1,504	—
1975	1,543	+0.37%
1982	1,710	+1.48%
1990	1,888	+1.25%
1999	1,785	−0.62%
2007	2,016	+1.53%
2012	2,124	+1.05%
2017	2,183	+0.55%
2023	2,400	+1.59%
Source: INSEE

== Economy ==
The economy is based on forestry.

== See also ==
- Communes of the Doubs department
