= Paul Révoil =

French diplomat and administrator

Amédée Marie Joseph Paul Révoil
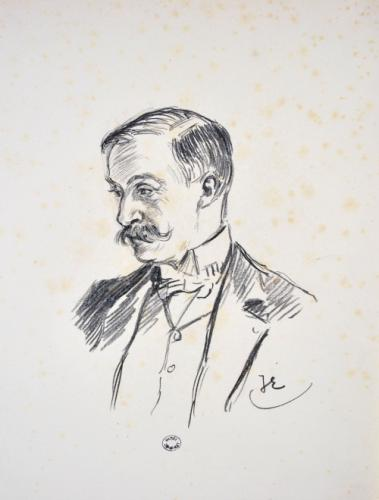
- Portrait of Revoil as governor general of Algeria by José Engel-Garry (1873-1915)

Governor General of Algeria
- In office 18 June 1901 – 11 April 1903
- Preceded by: Edouard Laferrière then Charles Jonnart (acting)
- Succeeded by: Maurice Varnier (acting) then Charles Jonnart (acting)

Personal details
- Born: 3 May 1856 Nîmes, Gard, France
- Died: 28 April 1914 (aged 57) Mouriès, Bouches du Rhône, France
- Occupation: Diplomat and administrator

Amédée Marie Joseph Paul Révoil (3 May 1856 – 28 April 1914) was a French diplomat and administrator who represented France in Morocco (1896–1901), was Governor General of Algeria (1901–1903) and was French ambassador to Switzerland (1906) and Spain (1907–09). He is known for his role in moving towards a peaceful extension of French influence in Morocco.

== Early years (1856–95) ==
Amédée Marie Joseph Paul Révoil was born on 3 May 1856 in Nîmes, Gard. His parents were Henri Antoine Révoil (1822–1900), Chief Architect in the Monuments Historiques, and Louise Henriette Anaïs Baragnon (1829–1870). He studied law and linguisa and published his thesis for a license, De l'Usufruit, in Paris on 30 May 1877. He was a member of the Conférence Molé-Tocqueville, where on 13 March 1877 his proposal to limit the Legion of Honour decoration to military services was examined.

Paul Révoil was Chief of Staff of Jules Develle at the Ministry of Agriculture from 1890 to 1893 before following Deville to the Ministry of Foreign Affairs, again as Chief of Staff. On 30 October 1893 he was appointed Deputy Director of Commercial Affairs at the Consulates department. He was promoted to Directeur du cabinet on 12 January 1895. On 31 October 1895 Revoil was named Minister Plenipotentiary to Rio de Janeiro.

== Morocco (1896–1901) ==
On 10 January 1896 Révoil became deputy to the Resident General in Tunis. He was appointed Envoy Extraordinary and Minister Plenipotentiary in Tangier, Morocco. The French were profoundly suspicious of British motives in Morocco, and thought they wanted to bring Morocco under their influence. Révoil even told Abel Combarieu^{(fr)}, secretary-general of the Élysée Palace, that if persuasion, bribery and intimidation did not work, it was expected that the wives of English diplomats would sacrifice their honour for the sake of England.

In April 1900 Alfred Le Chatelier wrote and printed the brochure Lettre à un Algérien sur la politique saharienne, which he sent to leading politicians. The brochure showed the risks of rash action on the Moroccan border and called for a cautious but firm policy. Eugène Étienne and Révoil both supported the brochure, and Le Chatelier was established as a force to be considered in setting North African policy. In 1900 Théophile Delcassé, Minister of Foreign Affairs, named Revoil, one of Étienne's closest friends, as head of the Tangier legation. This signalled the growing importance of Morocco to French policy.

== Algeria (1901–03) ==
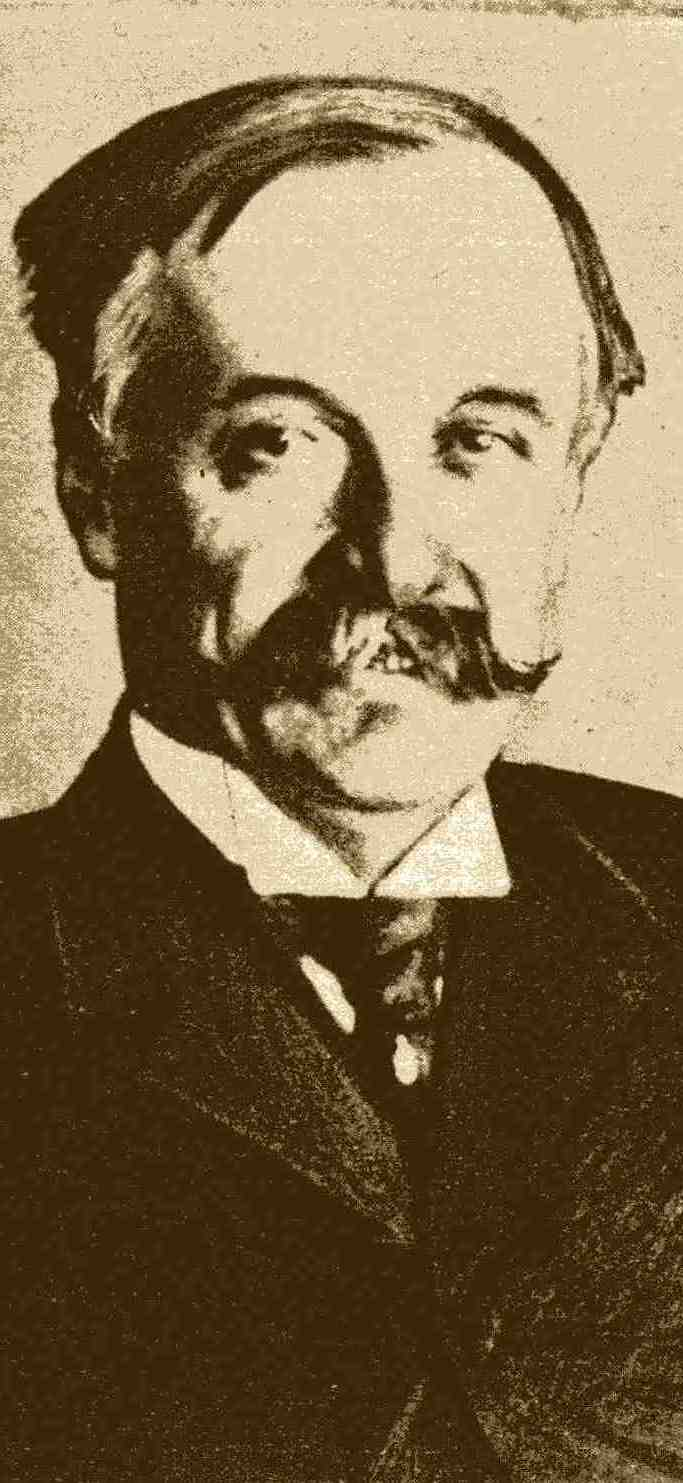
Paul Révoil by Eugène Pirou

In June 1901 Révoil left Tangier to become Governor General of Algeria in place of Jonnart. He was replaced in Tangier by Georges Saint-René Taillandier. He accepted the job in Algeria after some resistance, pleading poor health and the need to settle important issues in Morocco. He was persuaded by Delcassé, Pierre Waldeck-Rousseau, Minister of the Interior and President of the Council, and his friend Alexandre Millerand. Delcassé thought that Révoil would prevent any military adventures.

In July 1901 Révoil wrote that after 70 years of French rule in Algeria it was finally becoming possible to exploit the Sahara commercially and strategically, linking France's West African territories to Mauritania and French Sudan. At this time the status of the territories to the south of the traditional Algerian provinces was unclear. Stephen Pichon considered that a distinction should be made between Algeria and "territories annexed to Algeria". This would allow the authorities to determine the date from which the inhabitants were French subjects. Revoil was impatient with this question and wrote, "there can be no question of a distinction, in my view, between 'Algeria' and 'territories annexed to Algeria.'" He admitted that there had been no real annexation, but only "a police action in regions that we had always regarded as having belonged to French territory. He could not delimit the physical boundaries of the southern territories, but thought any person from a place under nominal French authority must be considered French.

During the two years he spent in Algeria Révoil followed a policy of cooperation with Morocco with the goal of avoiding military incidents in the border. In the summer of 1901 he went with the Moroccan envoy to Paris for talks about the frontier question, and acted as the main negotiator for France. On 20 July 1901 Revoil and representatives of Sultan Abdelaziz of Morocco signed the Protocol of Paris to define the border between Algeria and Morocco. The protocol of 20 July 1901 was confirmed by a protocol of 20 April 1902. Morocco recognized that Tuat was French territory, and agreed that in future when marauding tribesmen caused border incidents the agents of the two government should settle the issue on the spot through joint consultations.

Under the 1901 protocol two commissioners, Mohammed Guebbas of Morocco and General Auguste Constant Cauchemez of France, would go to the Guir-Zousfana region to implement the agreements. They would inform the people of the oases of the way the protocol affected them, would appoint local commissioners to regulate tribal disputes, and would choose places for the Moroccan police and customs posts and the police posts in the ksour of Figuig. This last was the most important to Revoil, since many of the tribesmen who had attacked French supply lines had taken refuge in the oasis of Figuig. The railway from Djéniane Bourzeg had already extended to about 10 kilometres (6.2 mi) from Figuig, and was to be extended towards Igli. It was essential that French troops have control of all the areas around the Oued Zouzfana valley so they could protect the line.

Révoil created the position of "director of economic services" for Henri de Peyerimhoff, who settled with his wife in Algiers in April 1902. Révoil later resigned due to political disputes and was replaced by Charles Jonnart. He left office on 11 April 1903. Peyerimhoff prepared a huge survey of the results of colonization that was published in 1906.

== Last years (1903–14) ==
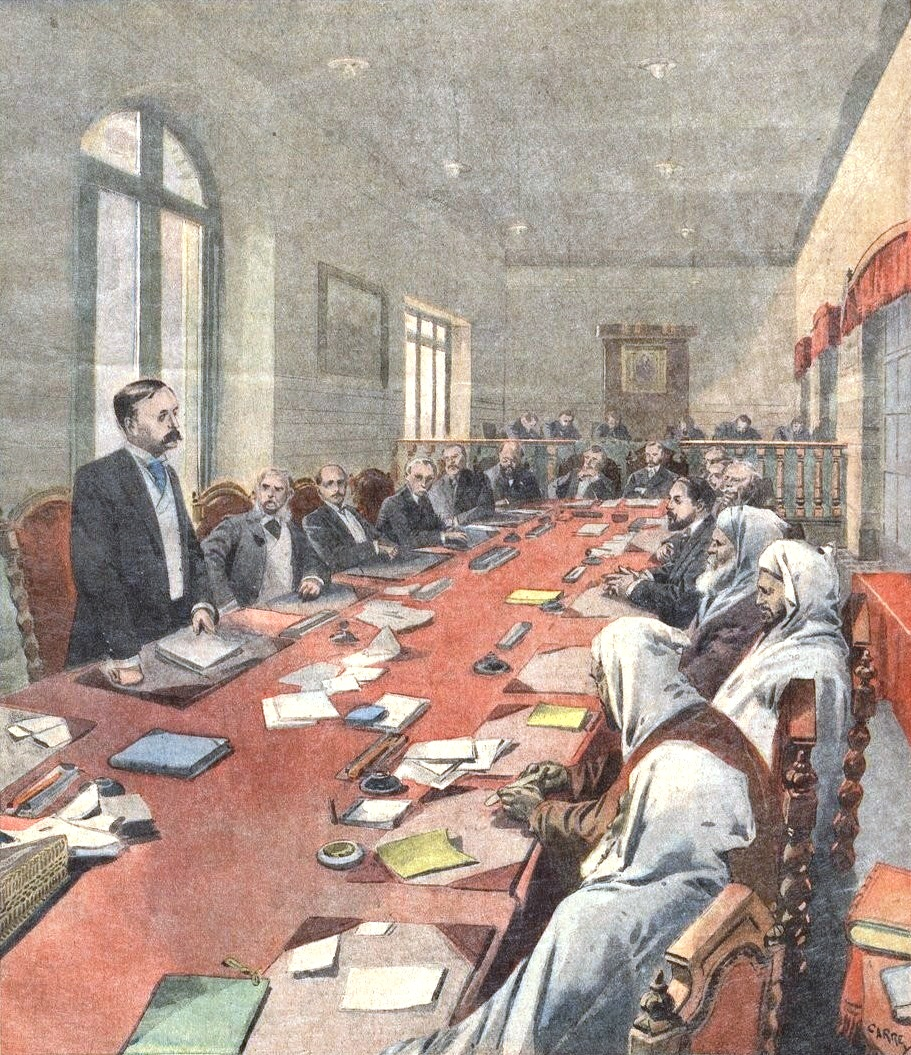
Opening session of the Algeciras Conference

On 6 June 1903 Révoil was assigned to study the potential for developing indigenous societies of agricultural insurance in Tunisia along the lines of existing institutions in Algeria. Révoil led the French delegation at the Algeciras Conference from 16 January 1906 to 7 April 1906, which aimed to resolve the First Moroccan Crisis. Révoil collaborated closely with his British counterpart, Sir Arthur Nicholson. He consulted with Nicholson before taking any important step, and was kept informed by Nicholson of the views of the other delegates. Révoil gave credit to the Archives marocaines of the Mission scientifique du Maroc (MSM, Scientific Mission of Morocco) for providing the French delegates with the advantage of accurate information on subjects such as the legitimacy of expropriation under Sharia law. (Note: Le Chatelier had founded the MSM at his own expense in 1904, and later received a grant from the Ministry of Education.) Révoil said, "The MSM is thus one of the most justified institutions of our Moroccan policy. One can say that it has imposed itself even upon our most informed experts.

Révoil was detached on 15 June 1906 by order of Maurice Rouvier, Minister of Foreign Affairs and President of the Council. On 26 September 1906 in Bern Revoil signed for France the International Convention Respecting the Prohibition of Night Work for Women in Industrial Employment. He was appointed ambassador to Bern, Switzerland, on 28 November 1906. He was appointed ambassador to Madrid, Spain, on 28 January 1907. He held office until 1909. He retired on 29 July 1910. He spent the last years of his life as director of the Ottoman Bank in Paris.

It was through Révoil's influence that the Baux Valley Canal was built in 1914 near his home at Mouriès, Bouches du Rhône, to cope with periods of drought. He helped provide a supply of drinking water to Mouriès. Révoil died on 28 April 1914 in Mouriès. The center of Mouriès is named the Cours Paul Revoil. The village of Revoil Beni Ounif, by the Beni Ounif oasis in the department of Oran near Saoura, was founded in 1916 and named in his honour.

== Publications ==
Publications by Paul Révoil include:

- Révoil, Paul (1877-05-30), De l'Usufruit (Th. licence : Droit : Paris), Paris: F. Pichon, p. 83
- Révoil, Paul (1878), Ébauches et reflets, Paris: A. Lemerre, p. 104
- Révoil, Paul (1908), Henri Boucard, 1826-1905 (Comité central agricole de la Sologne. Extrait du procès-verbal de l'assemblée générale tenue à Lamotte-Beuvron, le 19 octobre 1908), Romorantin: impr. de A. Standachar, p. 15
- Révoil, Paul (1939), Paul Révoil, ambassadeur de France. Journal tenu pendant la Conférence d'Algésiras, 12 janvier-9 avril 1906, Paris: Impr. nationale, p. 120

== Sources ==
- Andrew, C. (1968-06-18), Théophile Delcassé and the Making of the Entente Cordiale: A Reappraisal of French Foreign Policy 1898–1905, Palgrave Macmillan UK, ISBN 978-1-349-00421-8
- "Aureille à visiter", Provence 7 (in French)
- Bibliographie de la France (in French), 1877
- Bourelly, "Amédée Marie Joseph Paul Révoil", Geneanet (in French)
- Bourgeois, Emile (2013), History of Modern France, 1815–1913, vol. 2: 1852–1913, Cambridge University Press
- Burke, Edmund III (2014-09-10), The Ethnographic State: France and the Invention of Moroccan Islam, University of California Press, ISBN 978-0-520-95799-2
- Chatriot, Alain, "Henri de Peyerimhoff, figure du syndicalisme patronal de l'industrie houillère", Annales des Mines (in French)
- Dasque, Isabelle (December 2007), "Une élite en mutation : les diplomates de la République (1871-1914)", Histoire, Économie et Société, 26 (4), Armand Colin: 81–98, doi:10.3917/hes.074.0081, JSTOR 23613755
- Enjalran, Paulette, REVOIL, Paul (in French), Ministère de l'Europe et des Affaires étrangères - Direction des archives
- "International Convention Respecting the Prohibition of Night Work for Women in Industrial Employment", The American Journal of International Law, 4 (4, Supplement: Official Documents), Cambridge University Press: 328–337, October 1910, doi:10.2307/2212083, JSTOR 2212083
- Lewis, Mary Dewhurst (2013-09-27), Divided Rule: Sovereignty and Empire in French Tunisia, 1881Ð1938, Univ of California Press, ISBN 978-0-520-27915-5
- Pastoureau, Mireille (2008), Le duel fatal Harry Alis – Alfred Le Chatelier, 1er mars 1895, un épisode d'histoire littéraire et coloniale (PDF) (in French), Bibliothèque de l’Institut de France
- Paul Révoil (1856-1914) (in French), BnF: Bibliotheque nationale de France
- Révoil, Paul (1877-05-30), De l'Usufruit (Th. licence : Droit : Paris), Paris: F. Pichon, p. 83
- Thomas, Martin; Toye, Richard (2017), Arguing about Empire: Imperial Rhetoric in Britain and France, 1882-1956, Oxford University Press, ISBN 978-0-19-874919-6
- Trout, Frank E. (1969), Morocco's Saharan Frontiers, Librairie Droz, ISBN 978-2-600-04495-0
- Venis, Bernard (8 February 2002), Orleansville a Rovigo (in French)
- Vianes, Jean Pierre, "Paul REVOIL", Tourisme Mouriès (in French)
- White, John Albert (2002-06-27), Transition to Global Rivalry: Alliance Diplomacy and the Quadruple Entente, 1895-1907, Cambridge University Press, ISBN 978-0-521-52665-4
