= Henri Révoil =

French architect

- Born: 19 June 1822; Aix-en-Provence
- Died: 20 March 1900 (aged 77); Mouriès
- Occupation: Architect
- Children: Paul Révoil – Georges Révoil

Henri Révoil (1822–1900) was a 19th-century French architect.

== Biography ==
=== Early life ===
Henri Révoil was born in 1822 in Aix-en-Provence. His father was the painter Pierre Révoil.

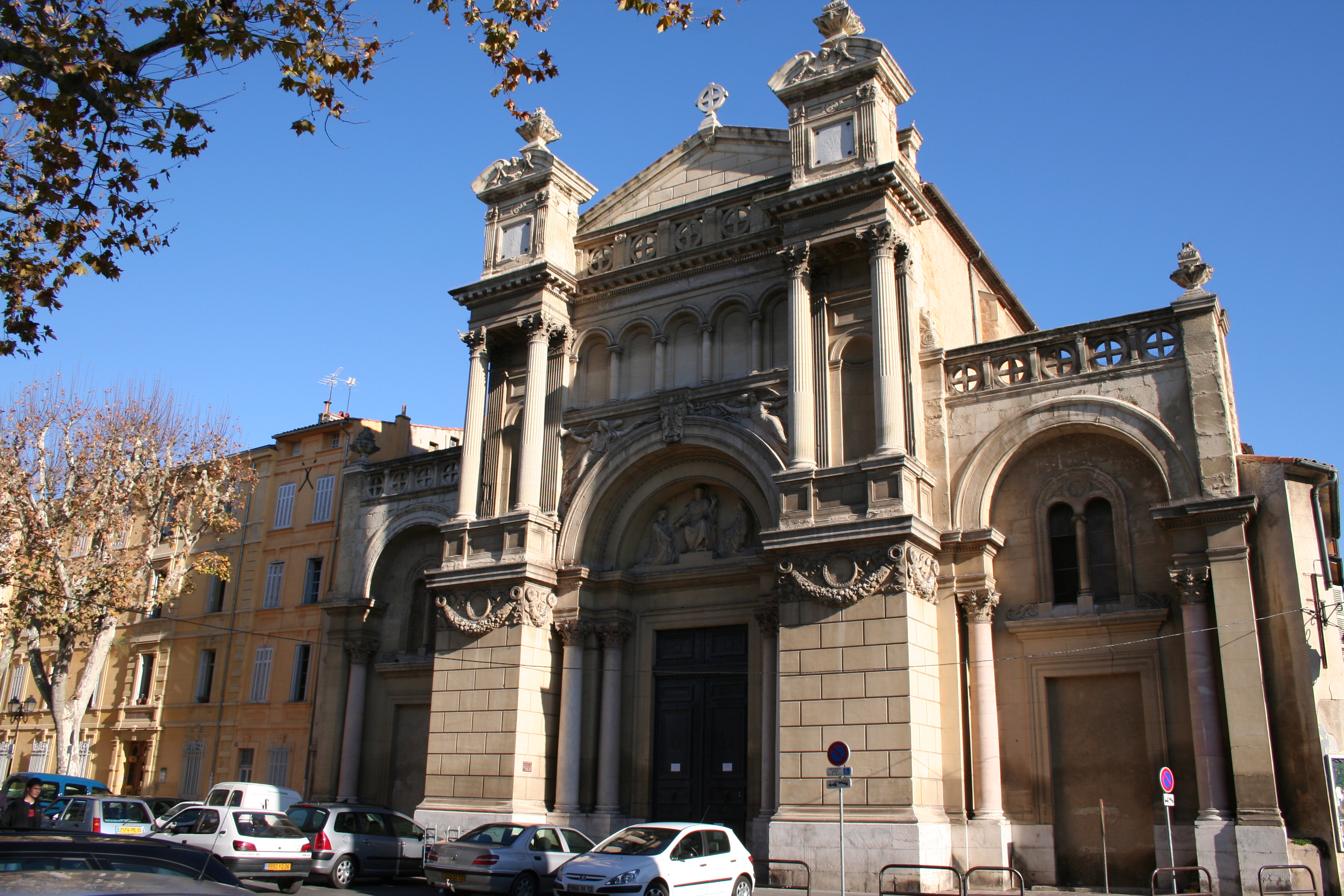
Facade of the Église de la Madeleine.

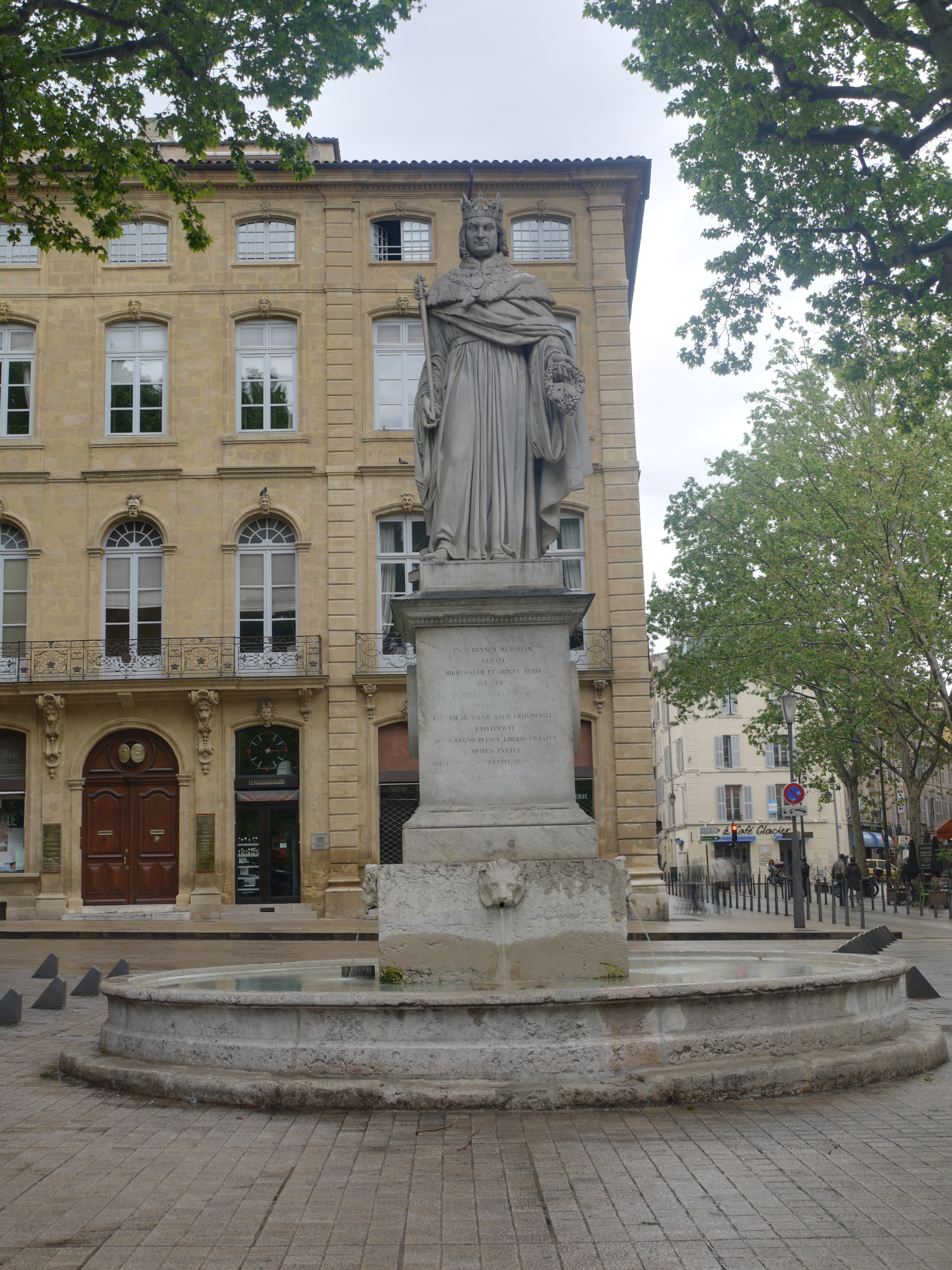
Fontaine du Roi René.

=== Career ===
From 1855 to 1860, he designed the facade of the Église de la Madeleine, which is listed as a Monument historique. He also designed the lower part of the Fontaine du Roi René on the Cours Mirabeau in 1819; three years later, in 1822, David d'Angers (1788–1856) designed a statue of René of Anjou on top of it.

Additionally, he was commissioned to decorate the Marseille Cathedral in Marseille. He went on to restore many other churches in Provence.

Additionally, he restored the Château de Tarascon in Tarascon.

He was a member of the Académie de Nîmes.

=== Personal life ===
He was married to Louise-Anais-Henriette Baragnon (1830-1870). They resided in Nîmes. Their son, Paul Révoil (1856-1914), became a diplomat and nonfiction author.

He died in 1900 in Mouriès.

== Bibliography ==
- Henri Révoil, Architecture romane du midi de la France: Architecture civile (Morel, 1874, Volume 3, 43 pages)
