= Union des Mines =

Former French bank

- Formerly: Union des Mines – La Hénin
- Company type: Bank
- Industry: Banking
- Founded: 23 April 1923
- Founder: Comité Central des Houillères de France
- Defunct: 1966
- Fate: Merged with Banque de Suez
- Successor: Banque de Suez et de l'Union des Mines
- Key people: Henri de Peyerimhoff (chairman); Louis Quesnot (chairman); José Ariès (chairman); Robert Demenge (chief executive; later chairman)

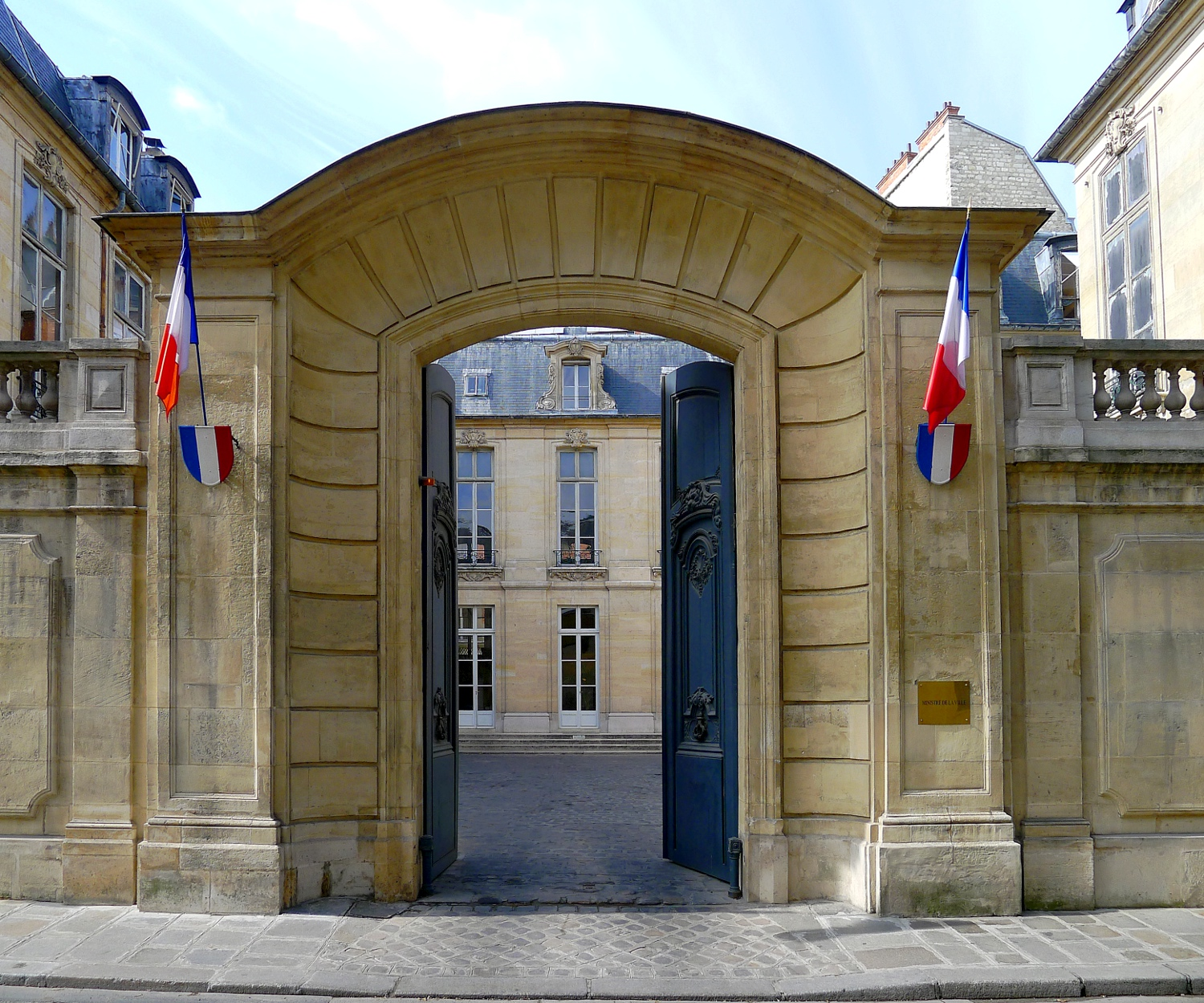
The Hôtel de Broglie at 35, rue Saint-Dominique in Paris, head office of Union des Mines from 1923 to 1945

The Union des Mines (lit. 'Mines' Union'), known from 1963 as Union des Mines - La Hénin, was a French bank established in 1923. It eventually merged in 1966 with Banque de Suez to form the Banque de Suez et de l'Union des Mines (BSUM). The latter in turn merged with Banque de l'Indochine in 1975 to form Banque Indosuez.

== Overview ==
The Union of Mines was created on 23 April 1923 by major French coal companies gathered within the powerful industry group the Comité Central des Houillères de France. The purpose of the bank was to support the financial operations of the coal mines and to provide them banking services.

The Union des Mines was initially headquartered at 35, rue Saint-Dominique in central Paris, the same building as the Comité Central des Houillères. After World War II, it relocated to 9, rue Louis-Murat on the right bank of the Seine. Henri de Peyerimhoff was the bank's first chairman, staying until 1932 when he was succeeded by Louis Quesnot who held the position until 1942, succeeded in turn by José Ariès until 1956.

The Union des Mines established several subsidiaries: Société de gestion d'intérêts miniers et industriels français à l’étranger (lit. 'Management Company for French Mining and Industrial Interests Abroad', est. 1923); British and Continental Banking Company (est. 1926); Banque Nouvelle La Prudence in Montceau-les-Mines (est. 1926); Société Financière, Industrielle et Minière (abbreviated as Sofimine, lit. 'Financial, Industrial and Mining Company', est. 1928); and Franco-American Company for Electricity and Industry (est. 1928). It also took various stakes in industrial companies such as the Compagnie des phosphates de Constantine, Mines de Salsigne, Société des Forces Motrices de la Truyère, Union électrique et financière, or Banque Générale du Nord.

In 1963, the Union des Mines merged with La Hénin, a bank created in 1949 by renaming and reorganizing the former Banque Générale Industrielle. Robert Demenge, who had been the chief executive of Union des Mines since 1956, became the chairman of the merged entity. In 1966, the Union des Mines-La-Hénin in turn merged with Banque de Suez to form Banque de Suez et de l'Union des Mines, in effect a subsidiary of the Suez Company.

== See also ==
- Mining in France
- List of banks in France
