= Georges Coulon =

French lawyer and politician

Vice-President of the Council of State
- In office 1898–1912
- Preceded by: Édouard Laferrière
- Succeeded by: Alfred Picard^{(fr)}

Personal details
- Born: 11 March 1838
- Died: 20 February 1912 (aged 73)
- Occupation: Lawyer, politician

Georges Coulon (11 March 1838 – 20 February 1912) was a French lawyer, politician and vice president of the French Council of State from 1898 to 1912.

== Family background ==
=== Eugène Scribe's son ===
Georges Coulon was officially the son of the actress Augustine-Antoinette Finot-Léonard and Antoine Coulon, choreographer and ballet director at the Paris Opera and Her Majesty's Theatre in London. However, there is speculation that Coulon was probably the son of Eugène Scribe.

=== Descendants ===
Georges Coulon had six sons: Jean-Paul Coulon, Jean-Pierre Coulon, Jean-Louis Coulon, Jean-Jacques Coulon, Jean-Claude Coulon and Jean-René Coulon. Jean-Louis and Jean-René, died during the World War I in 1914 and 1916. His first son, Jean-Paul Coulon was a well-known magistrate and his daughter Denise Coulon married the painter Olivier Debré, Michel Debré's brother, joining two famous families of the French Republic: the Pelletan and the Debré families. When Georges Coulon died in 1912, a state funeral was given in his honor and his six sons marched behind the cortege.

=== Villa Jean Marmaille ===
Georges Coulon built a huge villa by the beach of Saint-Georges-de-Didonne named: "Jean Marmaille", a reference to the first names given to his children. The house still exists and is occupied by descendants of Georges Coulon.
