= Amancey =

- Commune
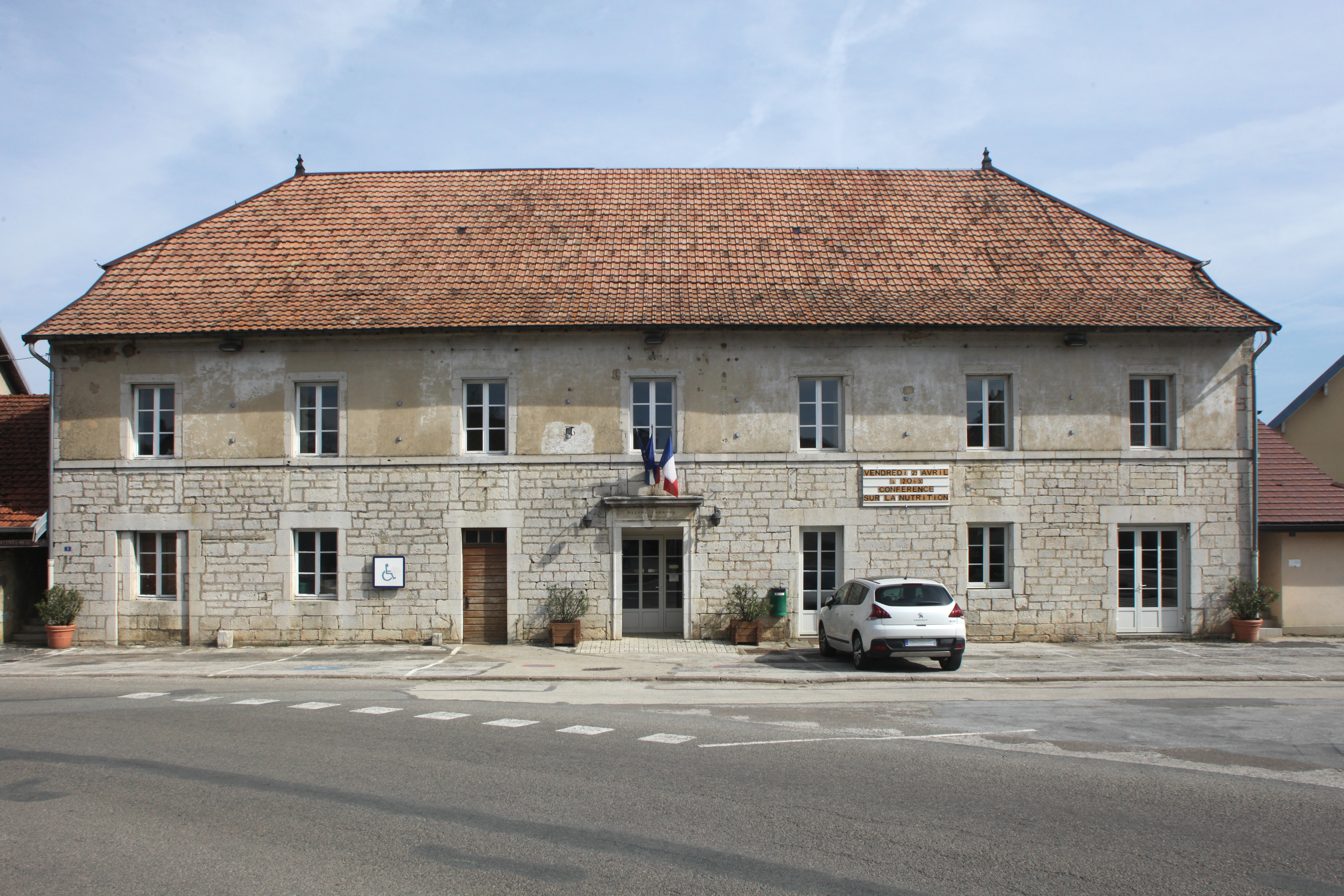
- The town hall in Amancey

- Coat of arms
- Location of Amancey
- Location within France Location within Bourgogne-Franche-Comté
- Coordinates: 47°02′19″N 6°04′20″E
- Country: France
- Region: Bourgogne-Franche-Comté
- Department: Doubs
- Arrondissement: Besançon
- Canton: Ornans
- Intercommunality: Loue–Lison

Government
  - Mayor (2020–2026): Philippe Maréchal
- Area^{1}: 13.78 km^{2} (5.32 sq mi)
- Highest elevation: 636 m (2,087 ft)
- Lowest elevation: 393 m (1,289 ft)
- Population (2023): 744
  - Density: 54.0/km^{2} (140/sq mi)
- Time zone: UTC+01:00 (CET)
  - Summer (DST): UTC+02:00 (CEST)
- INSEE/Postal code: 25015 /25330
- ^{1} French Land Register data, which excludes lakes, ponds, glaciers > 1 km^{2} (0.386 sq mi or 247 acres) and river estuaries.

Amancey (French pronunciation: [amɑ̃sɛ]) is a commune in the Doubs department in the Bourgogne-Franche-Comté region in eastern France.

== Population ==
Historical population
Year	Pop.	±% p.a.
1968	461	—
1975	451	−0.31%
1982	505	+1.63%
1990	535	+0.72%
1999	616	+1.58%
2007	628	+0.24%
2012	666	+1.18%
2017	687	+0.62%
2023	744	+1.34%
Source: INSEE

== See also ==
- Communes of the Doubs department
