= Charles Jonnart =

French politician (1857–1927)

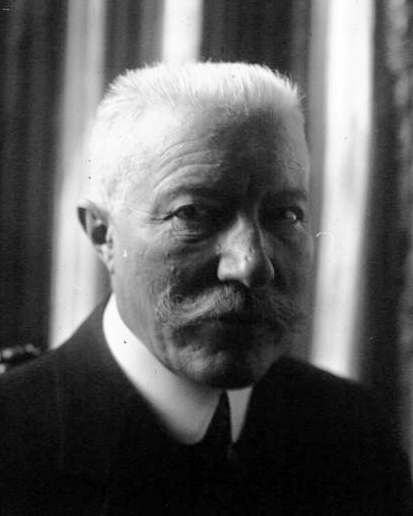
Charles Jonnart

Charles Célestin Auguste Jonnart (27 December 1857 – 30 December 1927) was a French politician.

== Early years ==
Born into a bourgeois family in Fléchin, Pas-de-Calais, Charles Jonnart was educated at Saint-Omer, then in Paris. Interested in the Algeria that he had visited as a young man, he was appointed in 1881 by Léon Gambetta to the office of Governor General of Algeria. In 1884, he was appointed director of the department's Algeria to the Ministry of Interior.

== Political career ==
Beginning a political career as a liberal, he was elected in 1886 as General Counsel of Saint-Omer and in 1889 as member of Pas-de-Calais. He distinguished himself in the house by his frequent interventions on colonial issues including the organization of Algeria.

Chosen in 1893 by Casimir Périer for the post of Minister of Public Works, he was elected in 1894 as Senator Pas-de-Calais. The same year, an automobile accident forced him to stop his ministry.

During 1900, he returned to Algeria, where he was appointed Governor-General. He resigned for health reasons but in 1903 again returned to his post. He helped promote the career of the future Marshal Hubert Lyautey. The latter, still colonel, was promoted to general and was entrusted by Jonnart with policy implementation in the region.

In 1911, Charles Jonnart was appointed as foreign minister in the cabinet of Aristide Briand. During the First World War, he was the Senate rapporteur of the Committee on Foreign Affairs. He was briefly Minister of Blockade in the government of Clemenceau. Then, the Allied Powers chose him as authorized representative to force King Constantine of Greece to abdicate the throne.

After the war, he became chairman of the Democratic Republican Party in 1920, and was then appointed ambassador of France to the Holy See, with the delicate mission to resume diplomatic relations with the Pope. He was elected to the Académie française on 19 April 1923.

There is an interesting account of the 11 June 1917 ultimatum of Jonnart, who, as former Governor General of Algeria, had come to Greece by which King Constantine was forced to leave his country and to live in exile in Switzerland. It was composed by Despina Geroulanos-Streit, Erinnerungen, Athens, and privately printed 1981, pp. 64–69.

Political offices
Preceded by Jules Viette	Minister of Public Works; 1893–1894	Succeeded by Louis Barthou
Preceded by Édouard Laferrière	Acting Governor-General of Algeria; 1900–1901	Succeeded by Paul Révoil
Preceded by Raymond Poincaré	Minister of Foreign Affairs; 1913	Succeeded by Stéphen Pichon
Preceded by Henry Chéron	Minister of Labor and Social Welfare; 1913–1914	Succeeded by Jean-Baptiste Abel
Preceded by Emile Métin	Minister of Blockade and Liberated Regions; 1917–1920	Succeeded by Albert Lebrun
