= Paul de Peyerimhoff de Fontenelle =

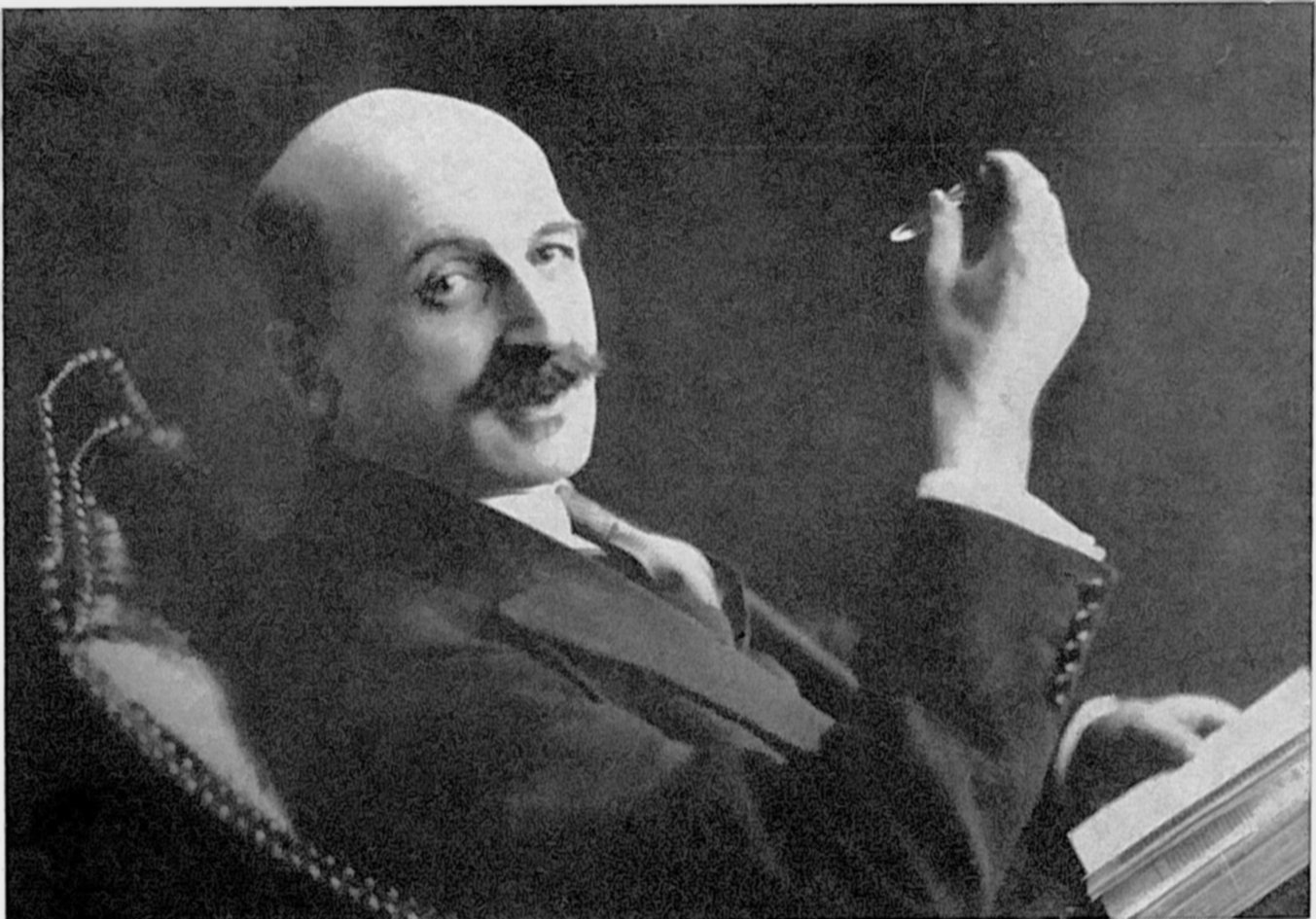
Paul de Peyerimhoff de Fontenelle

Paul-Marie de Peyerimhoff de Fontenelle (7 October 1873 - 2 January 1957) was a naturalist, botanist, entomologist, and zoologist. He made numerous natural history expeditions to northern Africa. He donated his various collections to the National Museum of Natural History in France.

He was the second son of Henri Peyerimhoff de Fontenelle (1838–1877), mayor of Colmar, France. His older brother was Henri de Peyerimhoff (1871–1953), a French civil servant and industrialist. Peyerimhoff obtained his education at the Collège Saint-Sigisbert in Nancy, and later at the École des Eaux et Forêts in the same city.

In 1896 he was appointed to the Eaux et Forêts of Senones (in the Vosges). It was here, while making his first investigations into the cave fauna of the Lower Alps, that Peyerimhoff became friends with J. Sainte-Claire Deville, at that time an artillery lieutenant, but who would go on to become a noted entomologist.

Peyerimhoff later moved to Algeria to work at the Forest Research Station there. In 1935, he was appointed director of the institution, a role that he kept until his retirement in 1937. At that point, Peyerimhoff was an honorary inspector general of the Water and Forests Department and also an officer of the Legion of Honor. During World War II, he was called to direct the Forest Research Station du Bois de Boulogne in Algeria. Only in 1950, due to illness, did Peyerimhoff finally abandon his interests in this area.

== Abbreviation (botany) ==
The standard author abbreviation Peyerimh. is used to indicate this person as the author when citing a botanical name. (See the list of all genres and species described by this author in IPNI.)
