= Ksabi =

Ksabi ﻗﺼﺎﺑﻰ
- Commune and town
- Location of Ksabi commune within Béchar Province

- Location of Ksabi within Algeria
- Coordinates: 29°5′52″N 0°58′48″W
- Country: Algeria
- Province: Béchar Province
- District: Kerzaz District

Area
  - Total: 2,220 km^{2} (860 sq mi)
- Elevation: 332 m (1,089 ft)

Population (2008)
  - Total: 3,187
  - Density: 1.44/km^{2} (3.72/sq mi)
- Time zone: UTC+1 (CET)

Ksabi (Arabic: ﻗﺼﺎﺑﻰ) is a town and commune in Ouled Khodeïr District, Béchar Province, in western Algeria. According to the 2008 census its population is 3,187, up from 2,656 in 1998, with an annual growth rate of 1.9%. The commune covers an area of 2,220 square kilometres (860 sq mi).

== Geography ==
Ksabi lies at an elevation of 332 metres (1,089 ft) on the left (eastern) bank of the Oued Saoura in the Saoura valley; it is the lowest town on this river before it reaches the endorheic lake Sebkha el Melah. The Grand Erg Occidental, a large area of continuous sand dunes lies to the east, while the rocky ridges of the Ougarta Range rise to the west, running from northwest to southeast along the opposite side of the river from the town.

== Climate ==
Ksabi has a hot desert climate, with extremely hot summers and mild winters, and very little precipitation throughout the year.

Climate data for Ksabi
Month	Jan	Feb	Mar	Apr	May	Jun	Jul	Aug	Sep	Oct	Nov	Dec	Year
Mean daily maximum °C (°F)	19.4 (66.9)	22.4 (72.3)	26.8 (80.2)	31.9 (89.4)	36.2 (97.2)	42.1 (107.8)	45.5 (113.9)	43.8 (110.8)	39.3 (102.7)	32.0 (89.6)	24.7 (76.5)	18.4 (65.1)	31.9 (89.4)
Daily mean °C (°F)	11.7 (53.1)	14.5 (58.1)	18.7 (65.7)	23.6 (74.5)	27.9 (82.2)	33.5 (92.3)	36.8 (98.2)	35.4 (95.7)	31.5 (88.7)	24.6 (76.3)	17.7 (63.9)	12.0 (53.6)	24.0 (75.2)
Mean daily minimum °C (°F)	4.1 (39.4)	6.7 (44.1)	10.7 (51.3)	15.4 (59.7)	19.6 (67.3)	24.8 (76.6)	28.1 (82.6)	27.1 (80.8)	23.7 (74.7)	17.2 (63.0)	10.8 (51.4)	5.7 (42.3)	16.2 (61.1)
Average precipitation mm (inches)	3 (0.1)	3 (0.1)	5 (0.2)	2 (0.1)	1 (0.0)	0 (0)	0 (0)	1 (0.0)	1 (0.0)	4 (0.2)	5 (0.2)	4 (0.2)	29 (1.1)
Source: climate-data.org

== Economy ==
Agriculture is the main industry in Ksabi. The commune has a total of 1,063 hectares (2,630 acres) of arable land, of which 932 hectares (2,300 acres) is irrigated. There are a total of 95,000 date palms planted in the commune. As of 2009 there were 2,092 sheep and 1,101 goats, but no camels or cattle.

== Infrastructure and housing ==
95% of Ksabi's population are connected to drinking water, 95% are connected to the sewerage system, and 97% (including 771 buildings) have access to electricity. There are no fuel service stations in the town; the nearest is in Kerzaz.

Ksabi has a total of 659 houses, of which 429 are occupied, giving an occupation rate of 7.4 inhabitants per occupied building.

== Transportation ==
Ksabi is connected by a local road to the N6 national highway between Béchar to the northwest and Adrar to the southeast. The nearest towns accessible by the N6 to the north are Ouled Khoudir, Kerzaz, and Timoudi. Ksabi is 404 kilometres (251 mi) from the provincial capital, Béchar.

There is a total length of 48.7 kilometres (30.3 mi) of roads in the commune.

== Education ==
There are 6 elementary schools, with 32 classrooms including 26 in use. There are a total of 966 school students.

2.5% of the population has a tertiary education (the lowest in the province), and another 9.2% has competed secondary education. The overall literacy rate is 62.6%, and is 76.1% among males and 47.8% among females. These are the lowest rates in the province overall and for females, and the second lowest rate for males.

== Health ==
Ksabi has 5 room care facilities and a maternity ward. For more advanced treatment, residents must attend either the polyclinic in Ouled Khoudir or the hospital in Béni Abbès.

== Religion ==
Ksabi has 6 operational mosques, with another 1 under construction.

== Localities ==
The commune is composed of four localities:

- Ksabi
- Timgharine
- Hassi Abdallah
- Bent Cherk
