= Zawiya =

Zawiya, Zawiyah, Zawia, Zaouia, Zaouiet and similar terms may refer to:

- Zawiya (institution), a building and institution associated with Sufis in the Islamic world

== Places ==
=== Algeria ===
- Aïn Zaouia, an Algerian town
- Mazer Zaouia, an Algerian village
- Zaouia El Abidia, an Algerian town
- Zaouia el Kbira, an Algerian village
- Zaouia Foukania, an Algerian village
- Zaouia Sidi Moussa, an Algerian village
- Zaouiet Kounta, an Algerian town
- Zaouiet Kounta District, an Algerian district
- Zawiya Thaalibia, an Algerian zawiya in the Casbah of Algiers
- Zawiya Thaalibia, an Algerian zawiya in the Issers
- Zawiyas in Algeria, an Algerian Islamic topic
- Zawiyet Sidi Amar Cherif, a Sufi zawiya in Algeria
- Zawiyet Sidi Boumerdassi, a Sufi zawiya in Algeria
- Zawiyet Sidi Boushaki, a Sufi zawiya in Algeria

=== Egypt ===
- Zawyet El Aryan, an Egyptian town
- Unfinished Northern Pyramid of Zawyet El Aryan, an Egyptian pyramid
- Zawyat Razin, an Egyptian city

=== Israel ===
- Khirbat Zawiya, a Palestinian Arab village in Baysan, depopulated in 1948 during Nakba
- Zawiya, Safad, a Palestinian Arab village depopulated in 1948 also during Nakba

=== Libya ===
- Zawiya District, (officially Zawia) a district in the west of Libya
- Zawiya, Libya, (officially Zawia) the capital city of that district

=== Palestine ===
- Az-Zawiya, Salfit, a Palestinian town in Salfit Governorate, West Bank
- As-Sawiya, a Palestinian town in Nablus Governorate, West Bank
- Zawiya, Jenin, a Palestinian village in Jenin Governorate, West Bank

=== Syria ===
- Zawiya Mountain, a highland region in Syria
