= United Nations Security Council Resolution 380 =

UN Security Council Resolution 380
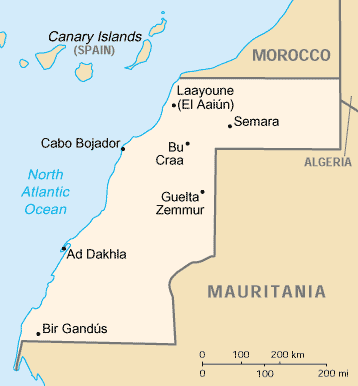
- Western Sahara
- Date: 6 November 1975
- Meeting no.: 1,854
- Code: S/RES/380 (Document)
- Subject: Western Sahara
- Result: Adopted

Security Council composition
- Permanent members: China; France; Soviet Union; United Kingdom; United States
- Non-permanent members: Byelorussian SSR; Cameroon; Costa Rica; Guyana; Iraq; Italy; Japan; Mauritania; Sweden; Tanzania

United Nations Security Council Resolution 380, adopted on November 6, 1975, gravely noted that the situation in Western Sahara had seriously deteriorated. The Council regretfully noted that despite resolution 377, resolution 379 and an appeal by the President of the Security Council to the King of Morocco Hassan II, the March still took place.

The Resolution goes on to deplore the holding of the March and to call on Morocco to immediately withdraw all the participants in the march from Western Sahara. The Council ends by calling upon Morocco and all other parties concerned to cooperate fully with the Secretary-General and to fulfill the mandate entrusted to him in resolutions 377 and 379.

No details of the vote by members of the Council were given, other than that it was "adopted by consensus".

== See also ==
- Green March
- List of United Nations Security Council Resolutions 301 to 400 (1971–1976)
- United Nations visiting mission to Spanish Sahara
- Western Sahara War
