= Jatri Uld Said Uld Yumani =

Sahrawi politician (1915–1993)

Jatri Uld Said Uld Yumani (Lakhsas, 1915 – † Rabat, Morocco, 21 December 1993) was a Sahrawi politician, professional grazier, procurator of the Cortes Españolas and president of the Djema'a.

== Uprising ==
In 1967, El Jatri started an uprising against Spain and the all-native army supported him. The military leader of the revolution was Corporal Merebbih of the Reguibat. As a result of this uprising, the government created the Djema'a or General Assembly of the Sahara—the first Sahrawi representative body, which gave the people their first opportunity for autonomy in the Spanish Empire.

== Parliamentarian ==
He was elected Procurator of the Cortes Españolas on 13 July 1963 by representatives of the Provincial Assembly of the Sahara. He was reelected in 1964, but left office on 20 December 1965; his seat went to Seila Uld Abeida Uld Ahmed. His swearing-in ceremony was performed privately in accordance with his Muslim religion.

He was elected to terms of office from 1967 to 1971 and was designated Head of state. He again left office on 4 March 1975 prior to the end of the legislative session.

== Lineage ==
Leader of one of the most important factions of the Reguibat, a tribe cut by four political borders (Western Sahara, Morocco, Mauritania and Algeria), he sustained the political balance of a tribe divided in three big separate blocks by political borders and was the leader (chej) of Le Boihat, the powerful Reguibat nomad faction from the western edge of their territory.

== Defection ==
On 5 November 1975, as President of the Djema'a, he swore his allegiance to Hassan II, who considered him the authentic representative of the Saharauis. This act was shocking after having been one of the biggest defenders of self-determination and independence. The previous 12 October 67 of the 102 members of the Djema'a had gathered in Ain Ben Tili, Mauritania and agreed to dissolve the body, leaving the Polisario Front the only legitimate representative of the Saharauis.

After attending a session of the Cortes gathered in Madrid, he went to Morocco accompanied by Saharauis Feidul Ali Derham and Ahmed Derhem. In a ceremony at the Royal Palace of Agadir, he submitted to Hassan II of Morocco speaking for the Djema'a, requesting the start of negotiations between Spain and Morocco for the retrocession of the Sahara to the Kingdom of Morocco.

Hassan Dirham, head of the Dirham clan, became president of the remaining Djema'a.

One of his children is a member of the Parliament of Morocco and another is a leader in the Polisario Front.
