= Khalihenna Ould Errachid =

Moroccan politician

- خليهن ولد الرشيد
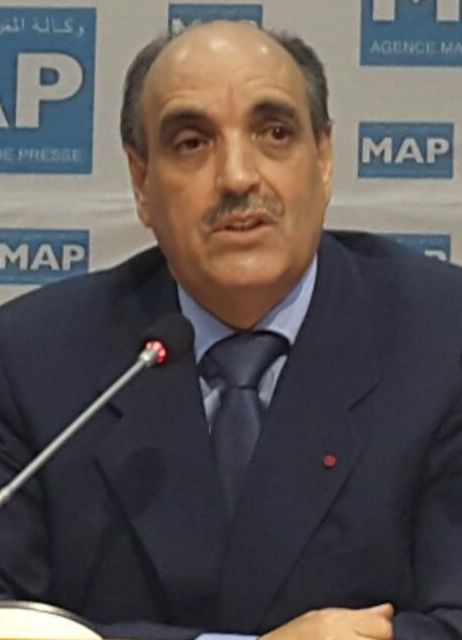
- Ould Errachid in 2015

President of the Royal Advisory Council for Saharan Affairs
- Incumbent
- Assumed office 25 March 2006
- Monarch: Mohammed VI

Mayor of Laayoune
- In office 6 June 1983 – 20 June 2009
- Monarchs: Hassan II; Mohammed VI

Member of Parliament for Laayoune
- In office 5 June 1977 – 30 September 2002

Minister in charge of the development of Southern Provinces
- In office 11 April 1985 – 30 September 1986
- Monarch: Hassan II
- Prime Minister: Mohammed Karim Lamrani

Minister in charge of Saharan Affairs
- In office 10 March 1977 – 5 October 1981; 5 November 1981 – 5 October 1983; 30 November 1983 – 11 April 1985; 30 September 1986 – 11 August 1992
- Monarch: Hassan II

President of the Sahrawi National Union Party
- In office 10 April 1974 – 22 May 1975

Personal details
- Born: 24 November 1951 (age 74) Laayoune, Seguia el-Hamra, Spanish West Africa
- Party: National Rally of Independents

Khalihenna Ould Errachid (Arabic: خليهن ولد الرشيد; born 23 November 1951) is a Moroccan Sahrawi politician. He is the president of the Royal Advisory Council for Saharan Affairs (CORCAS), a government body behind Morocco's proposed autonomy plan for Western Sahara.

== Biography ==
=== Early life ===
Khalihenna Ould Errachid was born on 23 November 1951 in a tent near Laayoune within the Reguibat tribe. His father, a respected herdsman in the tribe, was a veteran of a tribal revolt against France during their conquest of Morocco in 1937. He arrived in school at the age of 9. He attended both elementary school and high school in Laayoune.

Interested in politics from a young age, Ould Errachid was a rising nationalist, who attended reunions in his family home organized by Muhammad Bassiri in the 1960s. On June 17, 1970, Bassiri organized a large-scale demonstration in Zemla, a district of Laayoune which Ould Errachid took part in, he witnessed the Spanish Legion's crackdown on the protest which led to a dozen deaths and Bassiri's abduction.

After Bassiri's abduction, Khalihenna went into hiding in Laayoune. He was arrested three days later by Spanish colonial authorities but was quickly released on the intervention of his Spanish teachers. After obtaining his baccalaureate and a scholarship, he undertook his superior studies in an industrial engineering school in Madrid.

=== Political career ===
In 1974, Ould Errachid started the pro-Spanish Sahrawi National Union Party (PUNS). The PUNS, which had been created with the approval of the Spanish authorities, was the only authorized political party in Spanish Sahara (also in the rest of Spain, except the ruling Falange movement) between 1974 and 1975, had been created to counter the territorial claims from neighbours Morocco and Mauritania, as well as the Sahrawi nationalism Polisario Front, created in 1973.

In April 1975, during a press conference in Paris, Ould Errachid declared that "if it weren't for phosphates, nobody would vindicate the territory. What Morocco seeks is not the Sahrawi welfare, but the exploitation of phosphates. We want independence, and the circumstance is given that in the future state of Western Sahara there are phosphates deposits."

=== Under Hassan II ===
During the United Nations visiting mission to Spanish Sahara in May–June 1975, and before the Madrid Agreement, Ould Errachid fled from El Aaiún to Las Palmas, and then took another plane to Morocco. Few days after, on May 19, Ould Errachid declared his allegiance to the King of Morocco, Hassan II in Fez. Ould Errachid claims that he helped organize the Green March in 1975. Several sources alleged that he left Western Sahara with between 160,000 and 6,000,000 pesetas taken from a bank account linked to PUNS. Under King Hassan II, he was appointed in 1977 as Minister of Saharan Affairs, and later as mayor (President of the Municipal Council) of Laayoune from 1983 until 2006, when he was succeeded by his brother, Moulay Hamdi Ould Errachid.

He was viewed as very close to the King Hassan's right-hand man, the minister of interior Driss Basri, who held responsibility for the Saharan territories, where Polisario waged a guerrilla war against Morocco until the 1991 cease-fire (still in effect, pending final resolution of the conflict). Following the death of King Hassan in 1999, and the dismissal of Basri by the new king Mohammed VI's new government a few years later, Ould Errachid believed his political career was over.

=== Under Mohammed VI ===
In 2006, King Mohammed VI created the Royal Advisory Council for Saharan Affairs (CORCAS) to promote Morocco's autonomy plan. As head of the royal council, Khalihenna Ould Errachid made a public comeback, and was featured prominently in Moroccan diplomacy.

Khalihenna Ould Errachid considers the Polisario Front as an obstacle to a peaceful solution due to what he saw as deep dependency on Algeria. The Polisario refuses to acknowledge CORCAS and refuses Morocco's autonomy plan, opting for full independence instead.

In 2008, a transcript from a 2005 Equity and Reconciliation Commission meeting regarding the Western Sahara War was leaked to Al-Jarida al-Oula, during the meeting, Ould Errachid declared that "there are some people [...], about three or four Army officers who have committed what can be called war crimes against prisoners outside the scope of the war" and that "many civilians were thrown from helicopters or buried alive".

== See also ==
- History of Western Sahara
