= Boutarfaya =

- Village
- Location within Algeria
- Coordinates: 29°18′48″N 1°5′50″W
- Country: Algeria
- Province: Béni Abbès Province
- District: Kerzaz District
- Commune: Timoudi
- Elevation: 365 m (1,198 ft)
- Time zone: UTC+1 (CET)

Boutarfaya is a village in the commune of Timoudi, in Kerzaz District, Béni Abbès Province, Algeria. The village is located on the northeast bank of the Oued Saoura 4 kilometres (2.5 mi) east of Timoudi and 7 kilometres (4.3 mi) north of Ouled Khoudir.
