= Timgharine =

- Village
- Location within Algeria
- Coordinates: 29°9′49″N 1°2′46″W
- Country: Algeria
- Province: Béni Abbès Province
- District: Ouled Khoudir District
- Commune: Ksabi
- Elevation: 356 m (1,168 ft)
- Time zone: UTC+1 (CET)

Timgharine (also written Timrharine) is a village in the commune of Ksabi, in Ouled Khoudir District, Béni Abbès Province, Algeria. The village is located on the east bank of the Oued Saoura about halfway between Ouled Khoudir to the north and Ksabi to the south. It is connected to Ouled Khoudir by a local road along the side of the river, and to the N6 national highway by a road across the river to the west.
