= El Ksar, Algeria =

El Ksar
- Village
- Location within Algeria
- Coordinates: 29°13′11″N 1°1′47″W
- Country: Algeria
- Province: Béni Abbès Province
- District: Ouled Khoudir District
- Commune: Ouled Khoudir
- Elevation: 357 m (1,171 ft)
- Time zone: UTC+1 (CET)

El Ksar (also written El Gasr) is a village in the commune of Ouled Khoudir, in Ouled Khoudir District, Béni Abbès Province, Algeria. The village is located on the east bank of the Oued Saoura 5 kilometres (3.1 mi) southeast of Ouled Khoudir. It is connected to Ouled Khoudir by a local road along the side of the river, along with the other village of Ouled Rafaa.
