= SBAI =

SBAI may refer to:

- Softball Association of India, the governing body for softball in India
- Standards Board for Alternative Investments, an international standard-setting body for the alternative investment industry

== See also ==
- Sbai, a garment worn in mainland south east Asia
- Sbai (surname) including Sbaï
