= Bent Cherk =

- Village
- Location within Algeria
- Coordinates: 29°8′46″N 0°44′52″W
- Country: Algeria
- Province: Béni Abbès Province
- District: Ouled Khoudir District
- Commune: Ksabi
- Elevation: 349 m (1,145 ft)
- Time zone: UTC+1 (CET)

Bent Cherk is a village in the commune of Ksabi, in Ouled Khoudir District, Béni Abbès Province, Algeria. The village is located near the border with Adrar Province and is connected to the N6 to the southwest by a local road.
