= Togba =

- Location in Mauritania
- Coordinates: 17°23′30″N 10°21′17″W
- Country: Mauritania
- Region: Hodh El Gharbi
- Time zone: UTC+1 (West Africa Time)
- ISO 3166 code: MRT

Togba was a town in the Hodh El Gharbi region of Mauritania. Its ruins were first recorded in 1949 by French archeologist Raymond Mauny. Despite being remarkably close to the nearby medieval ruins of Aoudaghost, Togba does not appear to be related.

According to Mauritanian oral history, Togba was founded by members of the Tajakant tribe after their town of Tinigui was destroyed by internal tribal conflict, likely sometime in the 15th or 16th century. Some of the refugees came here and built Togba. The town survived possibly as late as 1905 before it was abandoned. The French archeologists who found it wrote that the ruins were "very recent."
