= Battle of Ain Ben Tili (January 1976) =

- Part of Western Sahara War
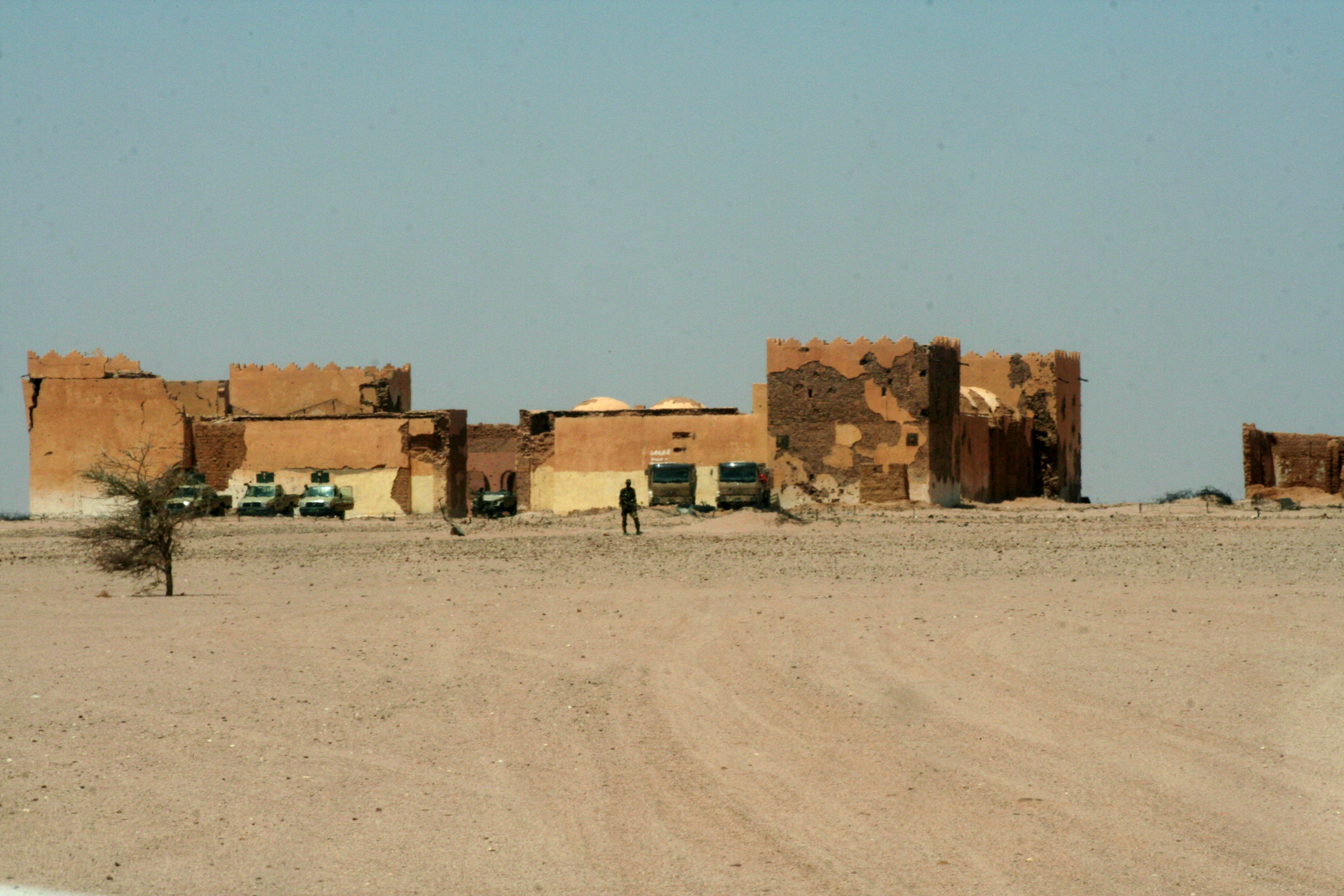
- Ain Ben Tili in 2010
Date	19-24 January 1976
Location	Ain Ben Tili, Mauritania
Result	Polisario Front victory
Territorial changes	Polisario Front captures the Ain Ben Tili outpost

Belligerents
Polisario Front	Mauritania Morocco

Commanders and leaders
Unknown	(Mauritania) Cmdr. Soueidatt Ould Weddad †

Casualties and losses
	(Mauritania) 480 killed: 32 soldiers captured; (Morocco) One F-5 shot down

The Battle of Ain Ben Tili was launched by the Polisario Front on January 19, 1976. Situated in the northern region of Mauritania, Ain Ben Tili was located just a few kilometers away from the town of Bir Lehlou, near the border with Western Sahara. Following repeated Polisario attacks, Mauritanian troops withdrew from the town five days later.

== Attack ==
The battle at Ain Ben Tili began when Polisario Front fighters launched an attack on Mauritanian troops in the town. The battle lasted for several hours, and the Mauritanian garrison faced intense and sustained assaults from the Polisario fighters. Commander Soueidatt Ould Weddad, an officer in the Mauritanian Parachute Regiment, tragically lost his life during the conflict. As the Mauritanian forces were under constant harassment, the Moroccan Air Force intervened to provide support to their Mauritanian allies.

On January 21, two days after the initial attack, the conflict escalated further when a Moroccan Northrop F-5A aircraft was shot down by a SAM-6 missile while operating in Mauritanian airspace. The pilot of the aircraft was killed in the incident, making it the first Moroccan plane to be downed since the beginning of the conflict in Western Sahara.

Despite the support from the Moroccan Air Force, the Mauritanian military found it increasingly difficult to maintain control of Ain Ben Tili due to the relentless attacks by the Polisario forces. As a result, the Mauritanian garrison received orders to retreat from the area on January 24, 1976, effectively ceding control of Ain Ben Tili to the Polisario Front.
