= Khalili Erguibi =

Moroccan military leader (1925–2017)

- Born: 1925
- Died: 21 October 2017 (aged 91–92) Military Hospital of Inezgane, Morocco
- Allegiance: Morocco
- Branch: Moroccan Army of Liberation; Royal Moroccan Army
- Service years: 1956–1980
- Children: 13, including Mohamed Abdelaziz

Khalili Ben Mohamed El Bechir Erguibi (or Rguibi) (1925–2017) was a Moroccan Captain, member of the Southern Liberation Army and a member of CORCAS. He is the father of Mohamed Abdelaziz, the 3rd Secretary General of the Polisario Front.

== Biography ==
Khalili was born in 1925 in the region of Oued Saguia el-Hamra as a member of the nomadic Reguibat tribe who transhumed in the northeast of the Spanish Sahara. In 1956, he went to welcome and pledge allegiance to King Mohammed V after his return from exile, and joined as commander, the Southern Liberation Army (a branch of the Moroccan Army of Liberation). After the disbandment of the Moroccan Liberation Army, he surrendered arms to the Royal Moroccan Armed Forces and joined their Ranks. He was assigned to Tan Tan, Chefchaouen, Kenitra, Marrakech, Kasbah Tadla until his retirement in 1980. In 1963, he participated in the Sand War and was the commander of the Moroccan corps. The last time he saw his son Mohamed Abdelaziz, dates back to 1972, when he was part of the Royal Moroccan Army, while Mohamed Abdelaziz was continuing his studies in Rabat and decided to join the ranks of the Polisario without informing him. In a 2007 interview with Asharq Al-Awsat, he said, "I was working and assured to send him money so that he could continue his studies in Rabat, and I thought that he was persevering for the sake of knowledge achievement, but I was surprised that he was leaving Rabat in the direction of the Algerian capital."

In 2001, he was received by King Mohammed VI, then appointed to the Royal Advisory Council for Saharan Affairs (CORCAS) in 2006.

On 18 November 18 2016, he was awarded the Wissam Al Mokafaa Al Watania (National Order of Merit), by King Mohammed VI.

== Death ==
On 21 October 2017, he died at the Military Hospital of Inezgane, where he had been admitted two days earlier following gastric complications. After three days, Morocco's High Commissioner of Former Resisters and Members of the Liberation Army paid a posthumous tribute to him "saluting the memory of a fervent defender of national unity and a fighter to countless heroic acts."

== Family ==
Erguibi had 13 children, the majority of them live in Morocco, while Mohamed Abdelaziz and two of his sisters live in the Sahrawi refugee camps.

His son, Mohamed Abdelaziz, was a student in the Mohammed V University of Rabat, who became one of the founding members of the Polisario Front and its 3rd Secretary General.

His son, Mohamed El Habib Erguibi, is a pro-Polisario lawyer and an active lobbyist with foreign delegations, he works from his office in Laayoune.

His son, Driss, is a surgeon in CHU Ibn Rochd of Casablanca.

His son, Mohamed Salem, works in Smara.

His son, Mohamed Saïd, is an engineer in Kasbah Tadla, where his younger brother Mustapha, is also employed as a secretary.

His son, Ahmed, is a provincial administrator in Beni Mellal.

As for his daughters, Asma, is an optician in Agadir, El Ouilda is a housewife in Laayoune, Fatimatou is a municipal employee in Smara and Khadijatou is seamstress in Kasbah Tadla.
