= United Nations Security Council Resolution 379 =

UN Security Council Resolution 379
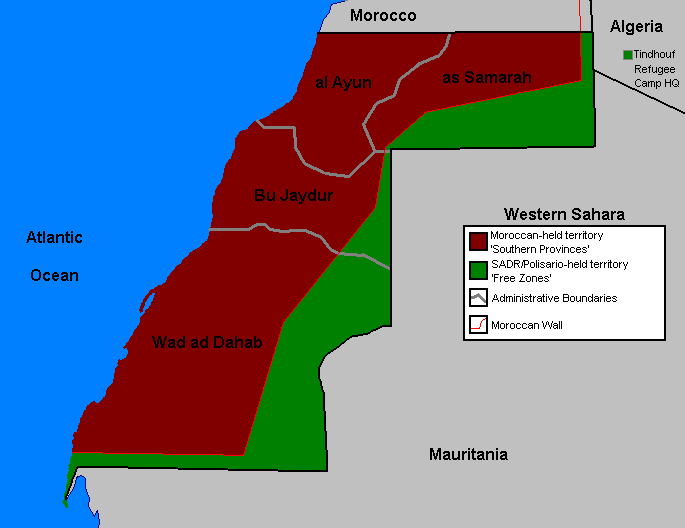
- Western Sahara (Moroccan Wall in red)
- Date: 2 November 1975
- Meeting no.: 1,852
- Code: S/RES/379 (Document)
- Subject: Western Sahara
- Result: Adopted

Security Council composition
- Permanent members: China; France; Soviet Union; United Kingdom; United States
- Non-permanent members: Byelorussian SSR; Cameroon; Costa Rica; Guyana; Iraq; Italy; Japan; Mauritania; Sweden; Tanzania

United Nations Security Council Resolution 379, adopted on November 2, 1975, considered a report by the Secretary General relating to the situation concerning Western Sahara. The council reaffirmed resolution 377, General Assembly resolution 1514 and noted the grave situation with concern.

The resolution urges all parties concerned and interested to avoid an action which might further escalate the tension in the area and requests the Secretary-General to continue and intensify his consultations with the interested parties and to report back as soon as possible.

No details of the vote were given, other than that it was "adopted by consensus".

== See also ==
- Green March
- List of United Nations Security Council Resolutions 301 to 400 (1971–1976)
- United Nations visiting mission to Spanish Sahara
- Western Sahara War
