= Zaouia el Kbira =

- Village
- Location within Algeria
- Coordinates: 29°29′1″N 1°30′3″W
- Country: Algeria
- Province: Béni Abbès Province
- District: Kerzaz District
- Commune: Kerzaz
- Elevation: 392 m (1,286 ft)
- Time zone: UTC+1 (CET)

Zaouia el Kbira (also written Zaouia el Kebira or Zaouia Kebira) is a village in the commune of Kerzaz, in Béni Abbès Province, Algeria. It lies on the Oued Saoura between Béni Ikhlef and Kerzaz. The village is on the N6 national highway, 8 kilometres (5.0 mi) northwest of Kerzaz and 15 kilometres (9.3 mi) southeast of Béni Ikhlef.
