= Royal Advisory Council for Saharan Affairs =

Advisory committee to the Moroccan government

Kingdom of Morocco Royal Advisory Council for Saharan Affairs
- Conseil royal consultatif pour les affaires sahariennes المجلس الملكي الاستشاري للشؤون الصحراوية
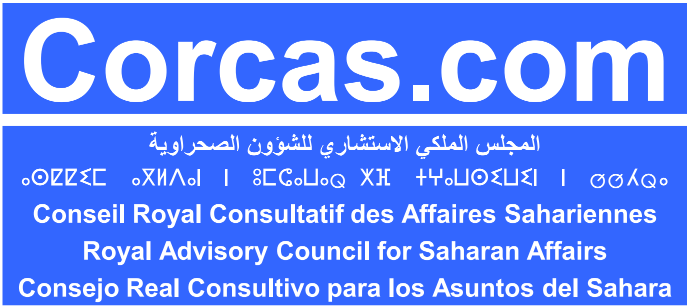

Agency overview
- Formed: March 25, 2006
- Headquarters: 9 rue Bani Oulid, Rabat; 33°57′48″N 6°48′43″W
- Agency executives: Khalihenna Ould-Errachid, President; Maouelainin ben Khalihanna Maoulainin, Secretary General
- Website: http://www.corcas.com

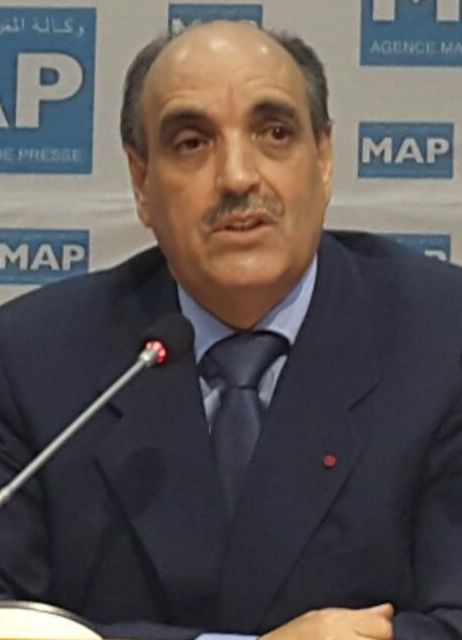
Khalihenna Ould-Errachid, the president of CORCAS

The Royal Advisory Council for Saharan Affairs (Arabic: المجلس الملكي الاستشاري للشؤون الصحراوية; French: Conseil royal consultatif pour les affaires sahariennes; Spanish: Consejo Real Consultivo para los Asuntos del Sahara) is an advisory committee to the Moroccan government on Western Sahara. It was created under Mohammed VI in early 2006, after a new autonomy plan proposed by Morocco to replace the United Nations' Baker Plan. The Polisario Front opposes Morocco's autonomy plan, demanding a referendum and independence.

== Mission ==
The CORCAS is a consultative body for proposals related to what Morocco calls their Southern Provinces, CORCAS also defends Morocco's claim over Western Sahara in local media and abroad. The CORCAS fully condemns the refugee camps of Tindouf and the Polisario Front, citing human rights concerns.

== Composition ==
There are 141 members of CORCAS, mostly Moroccan Sahrawi politicians and tribal leaders. The members were appointed by the King of Morocco and support Morocco's claim on Western Sahara. Khalili Erguibi, the father of the late Polisario Front leader and SADR president, Mohamed Abdelaziz was a member of CORCAS until his death in 2017.

The president of CORCAS, Khalihenna Ould-Errachid, founded the Partido de Unión Nacional Saharaui (PUNS) in 1974, the party supported the Spanish colonization of Spanish Sahara. After the departure of the Spanish in 1975 and the disbanding of the PUNS, Ould-Errachid pledged allegiance to the king of Morocco at the time, Hassan II and helped organize the Green March, he is an active defender of Morocco's claim over Western Sahara.

== International activities ==
Members of CORCAS are regularly featured in the Moroccan press. The president of CORCAS, Khalihenna Ould-Errachid, regularly attends meetings in international forums, such as the United Nations, where Western Sahara is discussed. Most notably, Ould-Errachid has met with the President of China, Hu Jintao.

== Criticism ==
In an interview with the independent Moroccan weekly magazine Le Journal Hebdomadaire, the ex-chairman of CORCAS' Human Rights Commission and head of the Association of Sahrawi Victims of Repression in the Tindouf Camps, El Houcine Baïda, criticized the lack of tackling human rights issues, and about the manner which Ould-Errachid runs the Council. In his opinion, the country's actions in the Western Sahara were alienating Sahrawis, and thus could push more youth towards what he defined as separatism. He further claimed that most of the organization's members had no knowledge of the government's autonomy plan - that they were supposedly responsible for drafting - and that president Ould-Errachid runs the council's affairs despotically, like "a new Franco".

== See also ==
- History of Morocco
- History of Western Sahara
- Sahrawi Arab Democratic Republic (SADR)
- Sahrawi National Council (SNC)
