= Meslila =

- Settlement
- Location within Algeria
- Coordinates: 29°15′59″N 0°54′26″W
- Country: Algeria
- Province: Béni Abbès Province
- District: Ouled Khoudir District
- Commune: Ouled Khoudir
- Elevation: 370 m (1,210 ft)
- Time zone: UTC+1 (CET)

Meslila is a settlement in the commune of Ouled Khoudir, in Ouled Khoudir District, Béni Abbès Province, Algeria. The settlement is surrounded by the dunes of the Grand Erg Occidental.
