= Ouled Rafaa =

- Village
- Location within Algeria
- Coordinates: 29°14′47″N 1°2′2″W
- Country: Algeria
- Province: Béni Abbès Province
- District: Ouled Khoudir District
- Commune: Ouled Khoudir
- Elevation: 356 m (1,168 ft)
- Time zone: UTC+1 (CET)

Ouled Rafaa (also written Ouled Raffa) is a village in the commune of Ouled Khoudir, in Ouled Khoudir District, Béni Abbès Province, Algeria. The village is located on the northeast bank of the Oued Saoura 3 kilometres (1.9 mi) east of Ouled Khoudir. It is connected to Ouled Khoudir by a local road along the side of the river, along with the other village of El Ksar.
