= Aspergillus stercorarius =

Scientific classification
- Kingdom: Fungi
- Division: Ascomycota
- Class: Eurotiomycetes
- Order: Eurotiales
- Family: Aspergillaceae
- Genus: Aspergillus
- Species: A. stercorarius

Binomial name
- Aspergillus stercorarius A.J. Chen, Frisvad & Samson (2016)

Species of fungus

Aspergillus stercorarius is a species of fungus in the genus Aspergillus. It is from the Nidulantes section. The species was first described in 2016. It has been isolated from dung in Kerzaz, Sahara, and Kagh Islands.
