= Béni Ikhlef =

Beni Ikhlef ﺑﻨﻰ ﻳﺨﻠﻒ
- Commune and town
- Location of Béni Ikhlef commune within Béchar Province

- Location of Béni Ikhlef within Algeria
- Coordinates: 29°34′30″N 1°36′33″W
- Country: Algeria
- Province: Béchar Province
- District: Kerzaz District

Area
  - Total: 2,615 km^{2} (1,010 sq mi)
- Elevation: 400 m (1,300 ft)

Population (2008)
  - Total: 2,459
  - Density: 0.9403/km^{2} (2.435/sq mi)
- Time zone: UTC+1 (CET)

Béni Ikhlef (Arabic: ﺑﻨﻰ ﻳﺨﻠﻒ) is a town and commune in Kerzaz District, Béchar Province, in western Algeria. As of the 2008 census, its population was 2,459, up from 2,280 in 1998, with an annual growth rate of 0.8%. The commune covers an area of 2,617 square kilometres (1,010 sq mi).

== Geography ==
Béni Ikhlef lies on the left (northeast) bank of the Oued Saoura in the Saoura valley. The Grand Erg Occidental, a large area of continuous sand dunes lies to the east, while the rocky ridges of the Ougarta Range rise to the west, running from northwest to southeast along the opposite side of the river from the town.

== Climate ==
Béni Ikhlef has a hot desert climate, with extremely hot summers and warm winters, and very little precipitation throughout the year.

Climate data for Béni Ikhlef
Month	Jan	Feb	Mar	Apr	May	Jun	Jul	Aug	Sep	Oct	Nov	Dec	Year
Mean daily maximum °C (°F)	19.2 (66.6)	22.3 (72.1)	26.6 (79.9)	31.3 (88.3)	35.8 (96.4)	42.2 (108.0)	45.1 (113.2)	44.6 (112.3)	40.4 (104.7)	33.6 (92.5)	24.4 (75.9)	18.9 (66.0)	32.0 (89.7)
Daily mean °C (°F)	11.6 (52.9)	14.4 (57.9)	18.7 (65.7)	23.1 (73.6)	27.6 (81.7)	33.1 (91.6)	36.5 (97.7)	35.1 (95.2)	31 (88)	24.1 (75.4)	17.5 (63.5)	12.3 (54.1)	23.8 (74.8)
Mean daily minimum °C (°F)	4 (39)	6.6 (43.9)	10.8 (51.4)	15 (59)	19.5 (67.1)	24.7 (76.5)	28 (82)	27 (81)	23.4 (74.1)	16.8 (62.2)	10.7 (51.3)	5.7 (42.3)	16.0 (60.8)
Average precipitation mm (inches)	6 (0.2)	5 (0.2)	9 (0.4)	4 (0.2)	2 (0.1)	1 (0.0)	1 (0.0)	1 (0.0)	2 (0.1)	6 (0.2)	8 (0.3)	7 (0.3)	52 (2)
Source: climate-data.org

== Economy ==
Agriculture is the main industry in Béni Ikhlef. The commune has a total of 394 hectares (970 acres) of arable land, of which 314 hectares (780 acres) is irrigated. There are a total of 36,420 date palms planted in the commune. As of 2009 there were 614 sheep, 347 goats, 45 camels, and 13 cattle. There were also 6700 chickens.

Tourist attractions include sand dunes, palm groves and an ancient fort.

== Infrastructure and housing ==
95% of Béni Ikhlef's population is connected to drinking water, 95% is also connected to the sewerage system, and 91% (including 560 buildings) have access to electricity.

Béni Ikhlef has a total of 436 houses, of which 302 are occupied, giving an occupation rate of 8.1 inhabitants per occupied building.

== Transportation ==
Béni Ikhlef is on the N6 national highway between Béchar to the northwest and Adrar to the southeast. Towns accessible to the north via the N6 include El Ouata, Béni Abbès and Igli, while to the south the towns of Kerzaz, Timoudi and Ouled Khoudir can be accessed. Béni Ikhlef is 312 kilometres (194 mi) from the provincial capital, Béchar.

There is a total length of 24 kilometres (15 mi) of roads in the commune.

== Education ==
There are 3 elementary schools, with 20 classrooms including 15 in use. There are a total of 706 school students.

9.1% of the population has a tertiary education (the second highest in the province), and another 21.9% has competed secondary education. The overall literacy rate is 81.8%, and is 90.6% among males and 72.6% among females.

== Health ==
Béni Ikhlef has one room care facility. There are no hospitals, clinics, or pharmacies. The nearest clinics are in Kerzaz and El Ouata, and the nearest hospital is in Béni Abbès.

== Religion ==
Béni Ikhlef has 2 operational mosques, with another 1 under construction.

== Localities ==
The commune is composed of two localities:

- Béni Ikhlef
- Guerzim

Guerzim also lies on the N6 highway, 10 kilometres (6.2 mi) northwest of the main town of Beni Ikhlef.
