= Hassi Abdallah =

Hassi Abdallah may refer to:

- Hassi Abdallah, Algeria, a village in Béchar Province, Algeria
- Hassi Abdallah, Mauritania, a village and rural commune in Mauritania
