= Guerzim =

- Village
- Location within Algeria
- Coordinates: 29°38′57″N 1°40′26″W
- Country: Algeria
- Province: Béni Abbès Province
- District: Kerzaz District
- Commune: Béni Ikhlef
- Elevation: 414 m (1,358 ft)
- Time zone: UTC+1 (CET)

Guerzim is a village in the commune of Béni Ikhlef, in Kerzaz District, Béni Abbès Province, Algeria. The village lies on the Oued Saoura 10 kilometres (6.2 mi) north of Béni Ikhlef and 28 kilometres (17 mi) southeast of El Ouata.
