= Sidi Ahmed Rguibi =

Sahrawi Islamic preacher and political leader

Sidi Ahmed Rguibi (Arabic: سيدي أحمد الركيبي) was an Arab Sahrawi Islamic preacher and political leader from Beni Hassan tribe, in the tribal areas of the north-western Sahara Desert in the 16th century. He was born in 1590 in El Kharaouiaa. He was considered a holy man and an Idrisid, or descendant of Prophet Muhammad. He died at the age of 75.

He claimed descent from Abd al-Salam ibn Mashish. The line of ascent between Sidi Ahmed Rguibi and Abd al-Salam ibn Mashish spans five generations and goes Sidi Ahmed Rguibi ibn Abd al-Wahid ibn Abd al-Karim ibn Abdallah ibn Abd as-Salam ibn Mashish.

He is the founder of the Reguibat, the largest and most powerful Sahrawi tribe, whose areas extended from Western Sahara into modern-day Mauritania, Morocco and Algeria.

His shrine, located in the northern Saguia el Hamra region of Western Sahara, is still visited every year by thousands of visitors.
