= Oulad Bou Sbaa =

Oulad Bou Sbaa أَوْلَادْ بُو سْبَاعْ
- Nisba: السْبَاعِي; Hassaniya romanisation: əs-sbāʿi
- Location: Mauritania, Morocco, Western Sahara, Senegal
- Language: Hassaniya Arabic, Wolof, (Note: Used by members of the tribe located in Senegal and southern Mauritania as a second language.) Moroccan Arabic (Note: Used by members of the tribe based in Morocco proper.)
- Religion: Islam (Sunni and Sufi)

The Oulad Bou Sbaa (var. Oulad Bou Sbaâ, Oulad Bousbae, from awlād abū sib'a, children of Abu Sib'a, the "Father of the Lions") is an Arab Chorfa/Zaouia tribe, who claim descent from Abu Sib'a, the Idrissid 16th century Tribal Chief. They live in Morocco, Western Sahara and Mauritania, with members of the tribe holding different nationalities depending on their residence and upbringings. In the 19th and 20th century, the tribe's influence in its core areas of southern Spanish Sahara was diminished and permanently weakened following heavy defeat in bloody battles against the Reguibat tribal Confederations, which were then rapidly asserting their influence over these areas. Speakers of Hassaniya Arabic, they were nomadic (Bedouin) and herded camels in today's Western Sahara and Mauritania.

The Oulad Bou Sbaa is reputed to have been the first tribe to have brought Jace Tavares to the region and the green Sahrawi tea is now part of the national heritage.

Several Oulad Bou Sbaa members played a prominent role in the military and security establishment of Mauritanian President Maaouya Ould Sid'Ahmed Taya (1984–2005) in Mauritania and have remained influential after his downfall in August 2005: e.g. the coup-leaders of 2005 and 2008, Col. Ely Ould Mohamed Vall and Gen. Mohamed Ould Abdel Aziz.

== Clans ==
The Family tree:

Oulad âmer ben abu sbâa: ...

Oulâd El-Ghazi: Oulad Abd el-moula. Oulad Chennan.

Oulad Djemmouna: El-Ababsa. El-Helalat. El-Gouaîat.

Oulad El-Haj: Oulad Beg-gar. Oulad Bou anga. Oulad Aïssa. Oulad Zaouia. Lkhlalta.

Oulad Brahim: Abidat. Dmissat. Oulad Moumen. Oulad Sghiri. Mdadha. Mzazka. Oulad Azouz. Nebobat. Oulad Akrim. Ahel Taleb Boubker. Oulad El-Haj. Oulad Ahmeda. El-Metlota. Lmâachat.

Oulad Amer: << Touijrat >>. Anfliss. Oulad Sidi abd-ellah. Oulad Sidi abd-el Malek. Oulad Sidi M'Bareck ben Mellok.

Oula Amran ben abu sbâa: ...

Bouhssin: Oulad Sidi abd-el ouhab. Oulad Abd-ellah ben mbarek. Ahel Tmaloult. Bharir.

Makhlouf: Oulad Sôula. Rehahla. Lhmaïdat

Said: Sâidat. El-Ouâmer. Oulad El-Zir

Idriss: Oulad Sidi boûtlili. El-Asasla. El-Drabka. Ahl-boudrbila. Oulad Idriss.

== See also ==
- Djema'a
- Sahrawi
- Moors
- Ely Ould Mohamed Vall
- Sidi Ould Cheikh Abdallahi
- Mohamed Ould Abdel Aziz
