= Sbai (surname) =

Sbai is a surname linked to the Idrissid Moorish tribe of the Oulad Bou Sbaa. Notable people with the surname include:

- Abderrahmane Sbai (1940-2010), Moroccan politician and civil servant
- Hassanine Sbaï (born 1984), Tunisian race-walker
- Ismaïl Sbaï (born 1980), Moroccan racing driver
- Salaheddine Sbaï (born 1985), Moroccan footballer
- Souad Sbai (born 1961), Moroccan-born Italian politician and writer
- Youssef Sbai (born 1978), Tunisian weight-lifter.
- Youssef Sbaï (born 2001), Moroccan AI Engineer and scientist
