= Reguibat =

Nomadic Sahrawi tribe of Sanhaja-Berber origins

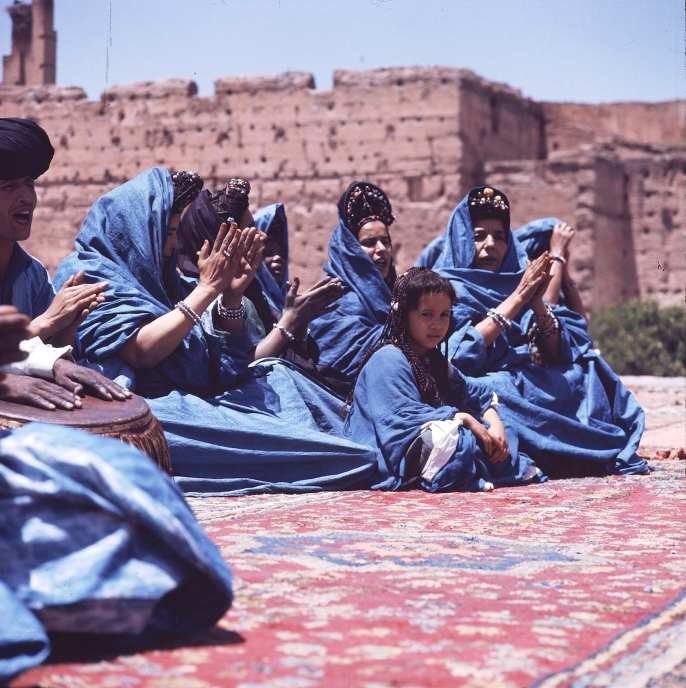
- Women of the Reguibat
- Ethnicity: Arab-Berber
- Nisba: al-Reguibi
- Location: Western Sahara, Mauritania, Morocco, Algeria
- Descended from: Sidi Ahmed al-Reguibi
- Population: >100,000 (1996)
- Language: Hassaniya Arabic
- Religion: Sunni Islam

The Reguibat (Arabic: الرقيبات, romanized: al-Rgībāt; variously transliterated Reguibate, Rguibat, R'gaybat, R'gibat, Erguibat, Ergaybat) is a Sahrawi tribal confederation of mixed Arab and Sanhaja Berber origins. The Reguibat speak Hassaniya Arabic, and are Arab in culture. They claim descent from Sidi Ahmed al-Reguibi, an Arab Islamic preacher from Beni Hassan who settled in Saguia el-Hamra in 1503. They also believe that they are, through him, a chorfa tribe, i.e. descendants of Muhammad. They are divided into two main geographical divisions - the Reguibat as-Sahel and Reguibat ash-Sharg - who are in turn divided into sub tribes. Religiously, they belong to the Maliki school of Sunni Islam.

Their population in 1996 exceeded 100,000 people. David Hart estimated their population to number from 200,000 to 300,000 in 1962 but this could be too high. They are today the largest tribe in Western Sahara.

== Origin ==
The eponymous founder and ancestor of the Reguibat is said to be Sidi Ahmed al-Reguibi who turned up to the Draa valley from Fez in 1503. Sidi Ahmed al-Reguibi claimed Sharifian descent through Abd al-Salam ibn Mashish which attracted many disciples - a lot of whom of Sanhaja origin - from his wanderings between the valleys of Draa, El-Gaada and the Saguia el-Hamra. The line of ascent between Sidi Ahmed al-Reguibi and Abd al-Salam ibn Mashish goes Sidi Ahmed al-Reguibi ibn Abd al-Wahid ibn Abd al-Karim ibn Abdallah ibn Abd as-Salam ibn Mashish.

== History ==
Initially an important Arabic zawiya or religious tribe with a semi-sedentary lifestyle, the Reguibat gradually turned during the 18th century towards camel-rearing, raiding and nomadism, in response attacks from neighboring tribes which provoked them into taking up arms and leaving the subordinate position they had previously held. This started a process of rapid expansion, and set the Reguibat on the course towards total transformation into a traditional warrior tribe. In the late 19th century, they had become well-established as the largest Sahrawi tribe, and were recognized as the most powerful warrior tribe of the area.

The grazing lands of the Reguibat fractions extended from Western Sahara into the northern half of Mauritania, the edges of southern Morocco and northern Mali, and large swaths of western Algeria (where they captured the town of Tindouf from the Tajakant tribe in 1895, and turned into an important Reguibat encampment). The Reguibat were known for their skill as warriors, as well as for an uncompromising tribal independence, and dominated large areas of the Sahara Desert through both trade and use of arms. The Reguibat have been trading in the Algerian oasis markets of the Touat and Gourara regions.

A long war started with the Tadjakant who were a tribe that founded the city of Tindouf in 1820. Ghazis happened until the end of the 20th century when in 1895 an assembly of the Reguibat including both the Reguibat as-Sahel and Reguibat Lagouacem decided on a full scale mobilisation of all able-bodied men with a warrior of the Oulad Moussa selected as dahman (the leader of the troops). This led to an attack on Tindouf by 1000 men of the Reguibat and the Reguibat were victorious. The Reguibat fought in other wars and assisted other tribes. For example, they assisted the Oulad Bou Sbaa in resisting a force from the Adrar and the Hodh led by Sidi Ahmed al-Kunti and sided with the Oulad Tidrarin in their rebellion against the Oulad Delim until the peace the Reguibat made with the Oulad Delim in 1892.

Reguibat Sahrawis were very prominent in the resistance to French and Spanish colonization in the 19th and 20th century, and could not be subdued in the Spanish Sahara until 1934, almost 50 years after the area was first colonized by Spain.

Since the 1970s, many Reguibat have been active in the Polisario Front's resistance to Moroccan rule over the still non-sovereign Western Sahara territory. Polisario leader Mohamed Abdelaziz was a Reguibi (from the Foqra faction), as is the Moroccan CORCAS leader Khalihenna Ould Errachid.

== Socio-political organisation ==
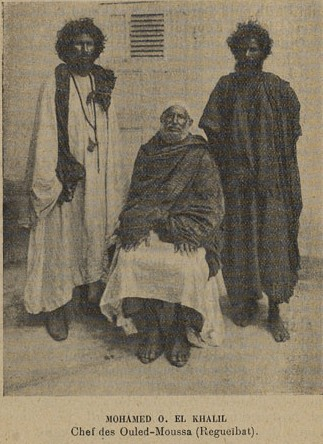
Mohamed O. El-Khalil, chief of the Oulad Moussa

There was not a single shaykh ash-shuyukh of the Reguibat. Rather, they had two shaykhs of equal standing representing the two main territorial divisions - the Reguibat as-Sahel and Reguibat ash-Sharg. Under each shaykh, there was a body of 20 councillors who were called the ait arba'in (the people of the forty). This is a Berber term and the ait arba'in is traditionally a feature of Berber political organisation meaning that the Reguibat adopted it some time ago. The ait arba'in was chosen by the shaykh of the territorial divisions and they carried out his edicts as well as the qadi's. The ait arba'in was operative on a full scale only during war time. They today do not exist.

== Subdivisions ==
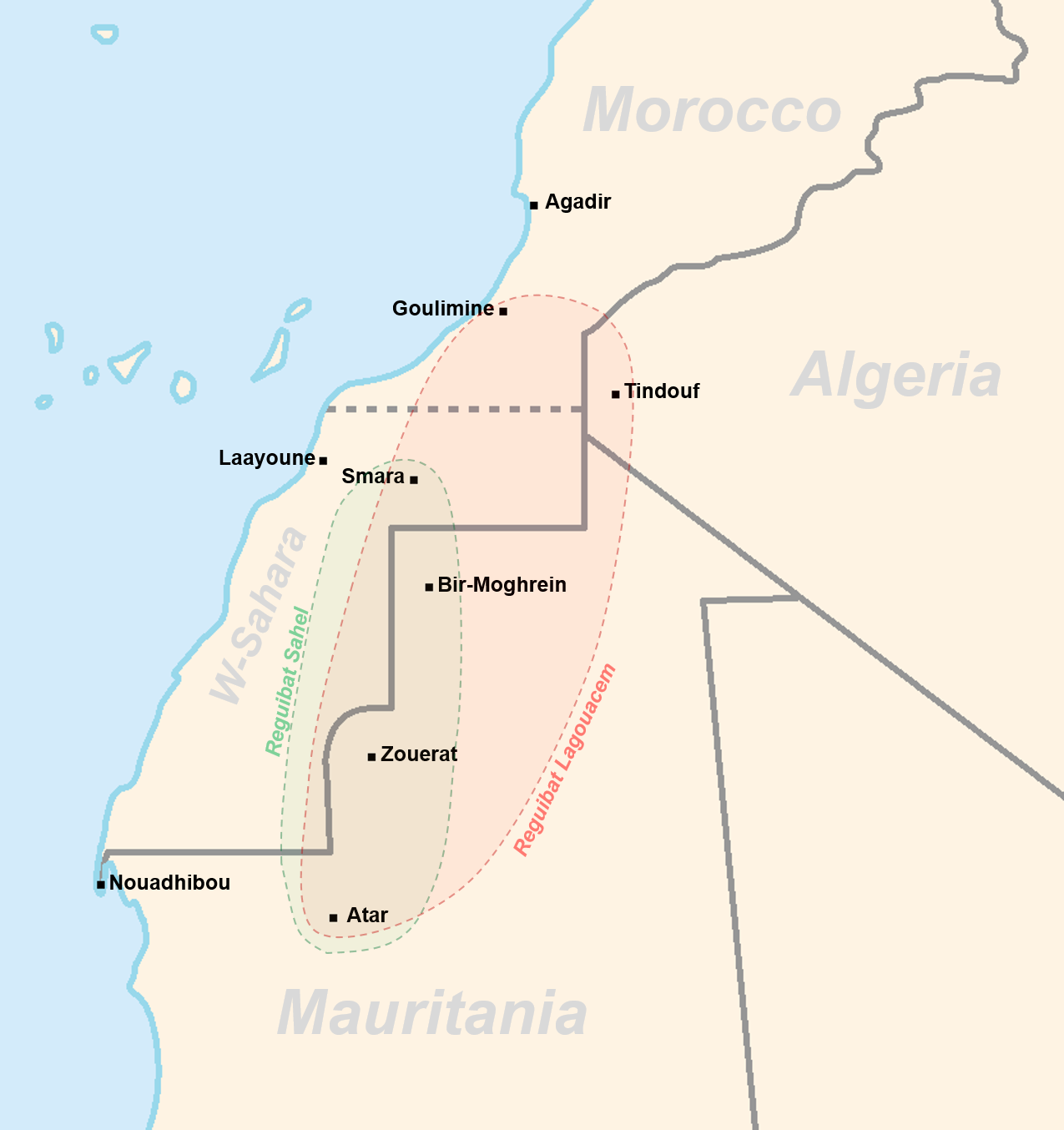
The two divisions of the Reguibat

Even though the Reguibat claim to have five fifths (which is a segmentation found in many large Berber tribes in Morocco like the Aït Atta and Ait Waryaghar), they have two main subdivisions:

- Reguibat as-Sahel (Arabic: رقيبات الساحل, romanized: Rgībāt as-Sāḥil, lit. 'Coastal Reguibat'), and
- Reguibat ash-Sharg (Arabic: رقيبات الشرق, romanized: Rgībāt ash-Sharg, lit. 'Eastern Reguibat') which is also referred to as the Reguibat Lagouacem

These two main subdivisions were distinguished by a camel brand called nār (Arabic: نَار, lit. 'fire') which corresponds to the wasm found among Bedouins in Saudi Arabia. For the Reguibat as-Sahel, their nār is kāf (ك) which is why they are also called Reguibat al-Kaf. For the Reguibat ash-Sharg, their nār is qāf (ق) which is why they are also called Reguibat al-Qaf. There are multiple traditions for how many children Sidi Ahmed al-Reguibi had ranging from 60 (20 from each of three wives) to 6 to 3 (from a woman of the Sellam called Kaouria Mint Mohammed).

According to the Historical Dictionary of Western Sahara, Sidi Ahmed al-Reguibi had three sons: Ali, Amar and Qacem. the Reguibat as-Sahel and Reguibat ash-Sharg are divided in the following way:

- Reguibat as-Sahel, who descend from Ali and Amar
  - Oulad Moussa
    - Oulad el-Qadi, Ahel Bellao, Oulad Moueya, Oulad Lahsen, Oulad Hossein
  - Souadd
    - Ahel Brahim Ben Abdallah, Ahel Ba Brahim, El-Gherraba, Oulad Bou Said, Ahel Khali Yahya
  - Lemouedenin
    - Ahel Ahmadi, Sereirat
  - Oulad Daoud
    - Ahel Salem, Ahel Tenakha, Ahel Baba Ammi
  - Oulad Borhim
  - Oulad Cheikh
    - Ahel Delimi, Ahel Baba Ali, Lemouissat, Lahouareth, Lahseinat, Ahel el-Hadj
  - Thaalat
    - Ahel Dekhil, Ahel Meiara, Ahel Rachid
  - Oulad Taleb
    - Oulad Ben Hossein, Oulad Ba Brahim, Oulad Ba Aaissa, Oulad Ba Moussa, Ahel Dera
- Reguibat ash-Sharg, who descend from Qacem
  - Ahel Brahim Ou Daoud
    - Ahel Sidi Allal, Ahel Belqacem Ou Brahim, Sellam, Selalka, Ahel Lahsen Ou Hamad, Lehmeidenet, Oulad Sidi Hamad, Jenha
  - Lebouihat
    - Ahel Daddah, Ahel Qadi, Ahel Haioun, Ahel Sidi Ahmed Ben Yahya, Lemrasguia, Ahel Sidi Abdallah Ben, Moussa
  - Laiaicha
    - Ahel Belal, Ahel Beilal
  - Foqra
    - Ahel Ahmed Ben Lahsen, Ahel Lemjed, Ahel Taleb Hamad, Rema, Lemnasra, Seddadgha, Oulad Sidi M'hamed

According to the tradition of the six sons as recorded by David Montgomery Hart, these six sons constituted the six clans of the Reguibat. These sons and clans are:

- Ali whence the Oulad Ali wuld Sidi Ahmed al-Reguibi (KĀF)
- Amr whence the Oulad Amr wuld Sidi Ahmed al-Reguibi (KĀF)
- Qasim whence the al-Qwasim or al-Gwasim (QĀF)
- Faqir whence al-Fuqra or al-Fugra (QĀF)
- Ba Bwih whence al-Bwihat (QĀF)
- Brahim u Dawud whence Ahl Brahim u Dawud (QĀF)

== See also ==
- Djema'a
- Tekna

== Sources ==
- Hart, David M. (1962). "The Social Structure of the Rgībāt Bedouins of the Western Sahara". Middle East Journal. 16 (4): 515–527. ISSN 0026-3141.
