= Tajakant =

The Tajakant (also Tadjakant Morocco) is a Sahrawi tribe of Berber Sanhaja origins. They speak Hassaniya Arabic.

The Tajakant mainly live in Mauritania, Morocco, Western Sahara, Algeria, and Mali. They are Muslims, adhering to the Maliki school of Sunni Islam.

The Tajakant tribe descended from the tribe of Lamtuna, a fraction of the powerful tribe of Sanhadja in the Mauritanian Adrar. They became sedentary during the ninth century, at the fall of the Almoravid empire and founded two cities, Tinigui and Togba, located between Chinguetti and Ouadane, but since disappeared.

The Tajakant were known as traders and warriors, and held a strong position in the trans-Saharan trade between Belad Asudan (Sub-Saharan Africa) and Morocco.

In 1852, Tajakant tribesmen founded a settlement and trading post in the oasis of Tindouf, in what is now Algeria. They were engaged in a lengthy war against the Reguibat and Kunta in the 19th c., their allies in this war were the Senhaja. This culminated in 1895 where the settlement of Tindouf was attacked and sacked by a raiding party of Reguibat tribesmen. Tindouf was destroyed, and most of the northern Tajakant wiped out; some populations remain in Morocco, Western Sahara and a few in Mauritania, where their members have gained importance as religious scholars.

Today's Tajakant are said to be sedentary, and engaged in small-scale trading and farming they mainly live in Morocco and the Moroccan administered territory of Western Sahara. They are one of the strongest proponents of the Moroccan claims on the territory, this might be due to their historical feud with the Rguibat. A few live in Algeria, Mauritania and Mali.

== See also ==
- Sahrawi
- Moors
- Djema'a
- Polisario Front
- List of Sahrawi tribes
