= Vidhan Bhavan =

Vidhan Bhavan is an Indian term for a building of a state legislative assembly and may refer to:

- Vidhan Bhavan, Jaipur, the seat of the legislature of Rajasthan
- Vidhan Bhavan, Lucknow, the seat of the legislature of Uttar Pradesh
- Vidhan Bhavan, Nagpur, a building of the Maharashtra Legislature
- Vidhan Bhavan metro station, a planned station in Mumbai

== See also ==
- Bidhan (disambiguation)
- Bhawan (disambiguation)
