= Sahrawi National Union Party =

Former political party in present-day Western Sahara

Sahrawi National Union Party حزب الاتحاد الوطني الصحراوي Hizb Al-Ittihad Al-Qawmi Aṣ-Ṣaḥrāwīyyah
- Spanish name: Partido de Unión Nacional Saharaui
- Secretary-General: Khelli Henna Ould Rachid (November 1974–14 May 1975); Dueh Sidna Naucha (14 May 1975–14 November 1975)
- Founded: November 1974
- Dissolved: 14 November 1975
- Headquarters: El Aaiun, Spanish Sahara
- Youth wing: PUNS Youth
- Membership (1974): 3,200
- Ideology: Reformism; Autonomism; Sahrawi nationalism
- Colors: Blue, Yellow and Red

Party flag

The Sahrawi National Union Party (Arabic: حزب الاتحاد الوطني الصحراوي, romanized: Hizb Al-Ittihad Al-Qawmi Aṣ-Ṣaḥrāwīyyah; Spanish: Partido de Unión Nacional Saharaui, PUNS) was a short-lived political party set up by Francoist Spain to rally indigenous support in its rebellious Spanish Sahara colony (presently Western Sahara).

== Creation of PUNS ==
The PUNS was created in late 1974 as the Revolutionary Progressive Party (Partido Revolucionario Progresivo), but soon changed its name. It was composed mainly of members of the Djema'a, a tribalist political body set up for similar purposes in the 1950s. Its flag is based on the Spanish flag for the Ifni-Sahara maritime province (1946-1975).

PUNS was during its time the only legal party within the territory of Francoist Spain, except the ruling Falange Española. PUNS was allowed to send delegates to the Cortes (Parliament) in Madrid. It had no decision-making powers, and was more an instrument of the military governors in Western Sahara. Its leaders and creators, Khellihenna Ould Errachid and Dueh Sidna Naucha, worked in close collaboration with Spanish authorities.

== Political profile ==
The party's political program was supportive of Spain, and changed according to the rapid evolution of Spanish policy. In first months of its existence, its political activity mainly consisted of statements denouncing the Polisario Front, a nationalist guerrilla which had by then taken over most of the countryside. PUNS also advocated independence as a distant goal to be preceded by autonomy within Spain, and conditional on good relations with the government in Madrid.

As the prospect of Moroccan invasion began to seem ever likelier after the 1975 International Court of Justice Advisory Opinion on Western Sahara on Western Sahara, the colonial authorities allowed the PUNS to increase its demands for independence and campaign intensely against Moroccan ambitions, even threatening armed struggle against an invasion.

As the difference of opinion rapidly shrank, the rank-and-file PUNS membership gravitated towards the Polisario, and as early as May 1975, the leaders of PUNS met with POLISARIO's Secretary General, El-Ouali, who consistently condemned the party as a "puppet" of fascism and colonialism. Many members were also present at the Ain Ben Tili and Guelta Zemmur conferences, although not as representatives of the party, but rather of the Djema'a or their tribal groupings.

In mid-1975, PUNS seemed to simultaneously be slipping out of Spanish control and losing its political relevance, since Spain had agreed in principle to relinquish control of the Western Sahara and consequently no longer had a need for a loyalist political party there. In addition to this, Polisario remained distrustful, and did not accept the demand of PUNS leaders to form a common political front while preserving the party's internal structure. El-Ouali instead insisted that the PUNS dissolve itself and that its supporters could join the Polisario Front as regular members.

== Collapse in 1975 ==
On July 6, 1975, the first clashes between PUNS and Polisario membership took place in El Aaiun, with several wounded. The night before, the PUNS offices in Smara were burned by POLISARIO members. In October, PUNS sent telegrams to the 1975 UN visiting mission members protesting the portray given in their report of Errachid as PUNS Secretary General, as he had been expelled of the party on May 14 for his treason. In the night of November 14, 1975, the remaining members of the party, headed by last Secretary General Dueh Sidina Naucha, dissolved the PUNS, giving the affiliates the chance to join the Polisario Front.

As Morocco and Mauritania invaded in November 1975, after the Madrid Accords, Spain abandoned PUNS, and what little remained of the party instantly collapsed. Its membership dispersed: many were swept away in the refugee exodus to Tindouf, Algeria, where they joined the Polisario. A small number, including some prominent leaders, instead went to Morocco, where they denounced their own earlier nationalist campaign and lent their support to the claims of King Hassan II to Western Sahara — notably, PUNS leader Khellihenna Ould Errachid, who still today (2012) acts as the Moroccan monarchy's main Sahrawi face to its claims to Western Sahara. Dueh Sidina Naucha went to Spain in 1975. In 1987 he surprisingly reappeared in the Liberated Territories during a UN technical visiting mission. He declared that even though not a Polisario member, he is a Sahrawi, so he support the Polisario Front as the legitimate representative of the Sahrawi people. Naucha added that after the Green March "our 20,000 (PUNS) militants integrated the POLISARIO: in war it is needed to fight united". He now lives in the Canary Islands. A very small number of activists went to Mauritania, supporting the Ould Daddah government's claims on the territory until its collapse in 1978.
