= Green March =

1975 military event

- Part of Western Sahara conflict and Hispano-Moroccan conflicts
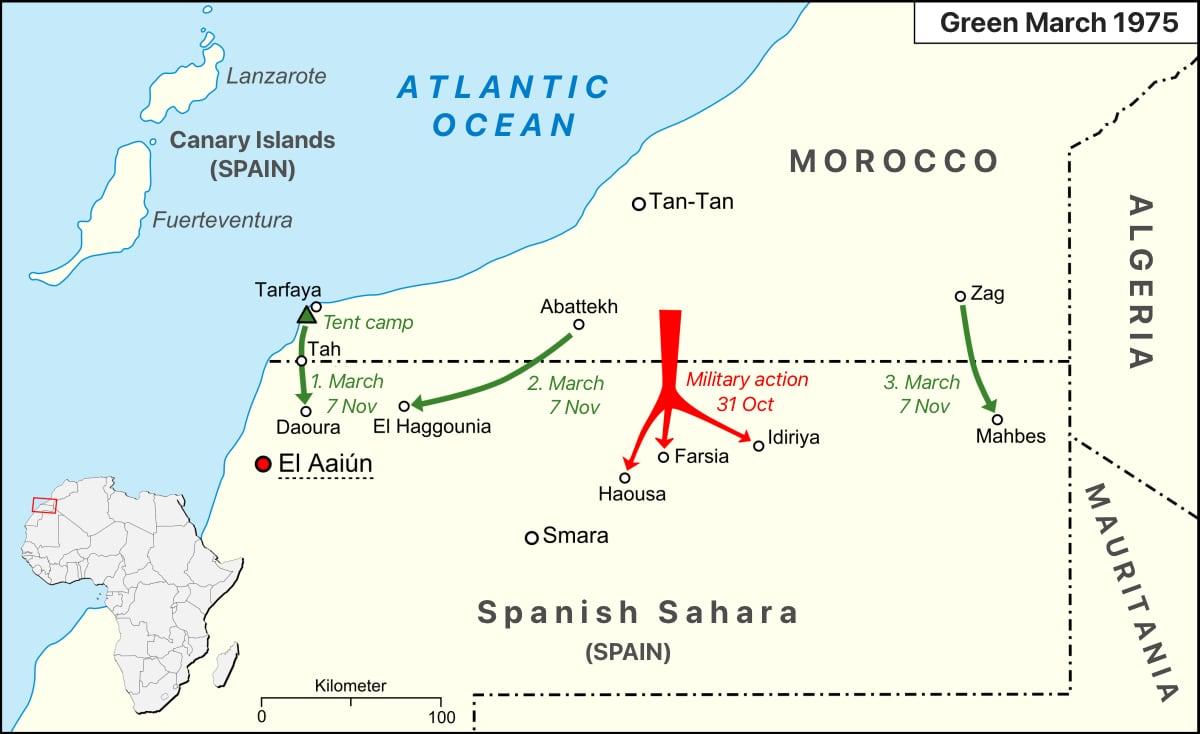
- Marches of 7 November (in green) and military action of 31 October (in red)
Date	6–10 November 1975 (complete withdrawal ordered on 18 November)
Location	Spanish Sahara
Result	Moroccan victory: Civilian withdrawal ordered after a 10 km penetration; diplomatic breakthrough leading to the Madrid Accords (14 November 1975)
Territorial changes	Spain leaves the territory; Morocco and Mauritania partially occupy and partition it

Belligerents
Spain	Morocco; United States (logistical and diplomatic support)

Commanders and leaders
Prince Juan Carlos; Carlos Arias Navarro; Gen. Federico Gómez de Salazar	Hassan II; Ahmed Osman

Units involved
Units of Tropas Nómadas; Light cavalry groups of the 3rd and 4th Thirds of the Legion; Expeditionary battalion of the Canary Infantry Regiment 50; Paratrooper and artillery units	Moroccan civilians with the support of the Royal Moroccan Armed Forces

Strength
c. 5,000 legionaries and army troops	c. 350,000 civilian volunteers (including c. 50,000 women) c. 30,000 military and gendarmerie personnel escorting the march c. 8,000–12,000 regular troops deployed along the northeastern border

The Green March (Arabic: المسيرة الخضراء, romanized: al-masīrat ul-khaḍrāʾ) was a strategic mass demonstration in November 1975, coordinated by the Moroccan government and the military, to force Spain to hand over the disputed, autonomous semi-metropolitan province of Spanish Sahara to Morocco. The Spanish government was preparing to abandon the territory as part of the decolonization of Africa, just as it had granted independence to Equatorial Guinea in 1968. The native inhabitants, the Sahrawi people, aspired to form an independent state. The demonstration of approximately 350,000 Moroccans advanced several kilometers into the Western Sahara territory. The operation also relied on logistical support and tacit approval from the United States Department of State and the CIA, as Washington and Paris, within the context of the Cold War, favored the integration of the territory into pro-Western Morocco over the emergence of an independent state potentially aligned with Algeria and the Eastern Bloc.

The Green March was condemned by the international community, notably in United Nations Security Council Resolution 380. The march was considered an attempt to bypass the International Court of Justice's Advisory opinion on Western Sahara that had been issued three weeks earlier. Morocco gained control of most of the former Spanish Sahara, which it still holds to this day. The refusal of the Sahrawi people to submit to the Moroccan monarchy shaped the Western Sahara conflict, still unresolved today, whose main episode was the Western Sahara War.

== Background ==
=== Spain in Western Sahara ===
The territory of Western Sahara, inhabited predominantly by nomadic Sahrawi tribes (subgroups of the Arab-Berber Bidhan), had been a Spanish possession since the last third of the 19th century. The first coastal settlement was founded in 1884 at Villa Cisneros (modern-day Dakhla), and over the following decades military occupation expanded inland, resulting in the establishment of the Spanish Sahara through the merging of Saguia el-Hamra in the north and Río de Oro in the south. Effective control over the desert interior, driven by geostrategic motives to safeguard the nearby Canary Islands, was only consolidated after 1934 with the establishment of the military base at Smara, and was completed during the Francoist regime.

In 1958, to avoid the early waves of decolonization and counter Arab nationalist pressure, the regime of Francisco Franco changed the formal status of the colony, proclaiming it the 53rd Spanish province and granting Spanish citizenship to Sahrawi residents, though they remained in a socially subordinate position. The Spanish administration systematically sought to isolate the indigenous population from Moroccan and Mauritanian influences; a secret 1960 document from the Spanish High General Staff explicitly recommended implementing "an anti-Moroccan, but non-nationalist policy".

The United Nations, refusing to recognize "provincialization" as a legitimate form of self-determination, placed Spanish Sahara on its list of non-self-governing territories in 1960. Through Resolution 2072 on 16 December 1965, the United Nations General Assembly repeatedly called on Spain to decolonize the territory and organize a referendum on self-determination for the indigenous population.

A significant economic incentive for maintaining Spanish presence emerged in the early 1960s with the discovery and subsequent exploitation, beginning in 1962, of the vast phosphate deposits at Bou Craa. However, continued colonial paternalism and the socio-economic marginalization of Sahrawis fueled anti-colonial opposition, culminating in the violent Spanish repression of protesters during the 1970 Zemla uprising in El Aaiún.

=== Moroccan and Mauritanian claims and domestic politics ===
Morocco, to the north of Spanish Sahara, had long claimed that the territory was historically an integral part of Morocco under the ideology of Greater Morocco, which had previously led to border clashes with Spain during the Ifni War (1957–1958). In the early 1970s, the monarchy of Hassan II faced a severe domestic crisis of legitimacy and repression known as the "Years of Lead", during which the King survived two military coup attempts in 1971 and 1972. The nationalist cause of Western Sahara became a crucial instrument to unite the armed forces, legitimize the monarchy, and forge national consensus across conservative and left-wing opposition parties.

At the same time, Sahrawi nationalism solidified: in 1973, led by Sahrawi university students including El-Ouali Mustapha Sayed, the Polisario Front was founded as an anti-colonial guerrilla movement armed and financed by neighboring Algeria. Under pressure from both Polisario insurgency and parallel territorial claims from Mauritania to the south, the Spanish government agreed in 1974 to conduct a census to prepare for a UN-sponsored self-determination referendum scheduled for the following year. Spain also attempted unsuccessfully to create a pro-Spanish political faction, the Partido de la Unión Nacional Saharaui (PUNS).

=== The International Court of Justice advisory opinion ===
Morocco intended to vindicate its claims and halt the planned referendum by demanding an advisory opinion from the International Court of Justice (ICJ). A UN visiting mission that toured the territory in May 1974 had concluded that the overwhelming majority of Sahrawis rejected annexation by either Morocco or Mauritania and favored complete independence, with the Polisario Front as their leading political force.

The ICJ issued its opinion on 16 October 1975. The court found that Western Sahara was not terra nullius at the time of Spanish colonization, and recognized that historical legal ties of allegiance (bay'a) existed between "some, but only some" Sahrawi tribes and the Sultan of Morocco, alongside land rights ties with Mauritanian tribes. However, the court unanimously concluded that none of these historical ties constituted legal ties of territorial sovereignty between Western Sahara and either state, and therefore could not override the application of General Assembly Resolution 1514 (XV) regarding the decolonization of Western Sahara and the indigenous population's right to self-determination through a free and genuine expression of their will.

== Preparation and logistics ==
=== Announcement of the March ===
Having been briefed through diplomatic channels on the likely outcome of the ICJ ruling, Hassan II held a secret meeting on 26 September 1975 with provincial governors to plan a mass mobilization. Days later, the CIA informed US Secretary of State Henry Kissinger of Moroccan invasion plans; the US advised formal caution but assured tacit support to prevent an independent Western Sahara from falling into the socialist orbit of Algiers and Moscow.

Within hours of the ICJ verdict's release on 16 October 1975, the King addressed the nation on state television. Selectively citing paragraph 162 of the ruling—which acknowledged historical ties of allegiance—while omitting the court's final conclusion favoring self-determination, Hassan II declared that "the right has prevailed over injustice". He announced the organization of a peaceful "Green March" of 350,000 unarmed civilian volunteers carrying Qur'ans and Moroccan flags to cross into Spanish Sahara and "reunite it with the Motherland".

=== Recruitment and logistical scale ===
Within three days, over 524,000 Moroccan citizens registered at recruitment offices. The government established regional quotas to select the final 350,000 participants: southern coastal provinces between Marrakesh and Agadir contributed over 120,000 marchers, central Atlantic coastal cities provided 72,000, and southern border provinces such as Tarfaya, Tiznit, and Errachidia contributed 53,000. Northern Morocco (from Tangier to Oujda) was deliberately underrepresented with 65,000 participants. University students were excluded for political security reasons, while participation was encouraged for 50,000 women and a significant contingent of civil servants.

The logistical effort was immense, financed by state funds and financial donations from Arab League allies, primarily Saudi Arabia:

- A total of 113 special trains and over 2,100 light vehicles and 6,000 requisitioned trucks and buses transported volunteers to the southern staging area in Tarfaya.
- A massive tent city covering 70 km² with 22,000 tents was erected near the border.
- Over 17,000 tons of food and 127,800 tons of water and fuel supplies were stockpiled and continuously airlifted by Royal Moroccan Air Force C-130 aircraft, supported by 470 civilian doctors and 230 ambulances.

=== Covert military operations ===
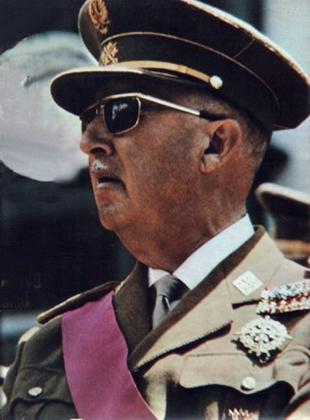
General Francisco Franco, whose terminal illness induced the Spanish government to avoid an open colonial war.

While international attention focused on the civilian encampment at Tarfaya, the Moroccan Army launched a covert military invasion along the eastern frontier of Spanish Sahara. Beginning on 31 October 1975, armored and infantry units totaling approximately 10,000 troops crossed the northeastern border, clashing with Polisario Front forces and occupying remote outposts evacuated by Spain, including Farsia, Haousa, and Idiriya. This maneuver aimed to block any potential conventional military intervention by Algeria and fix Polisario guerrilla forces inland, far from the Atlantic coast where the civilian march was scheduled to cross. Additionally, some 30,000 regular army soldiers in civilian clothes and gendarmes were embedded within the civilian march to maintain discipline, control column movements, and provide internal security.

== The Green March ==
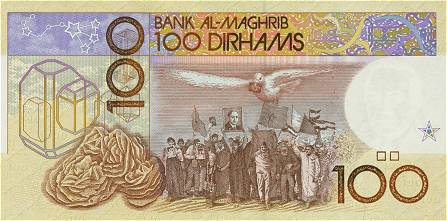
A 100 dirham note from 1991 commemorating the Green March

=== Border crossing (6 November) ===
The crisis erupted during a moment of deep domestic political vulnerability in Spain: General Francisco Franco lay dying in Madrid (he would die on 20 November 1975), while Prince Juan Carlos acted as temporary head of state in an atmosphere of institutional uncertainty. Prime Minister Carlos Arias Navarro's government, fearing that armed clash in Africa could trigger a domestic revolution similar to Portugal's Carnation Revolution, ordered military forces to avoid bloodshed.

On 4 November, the Spanish military commander in the Sahara, General Federico Gómez de Salazar, activated "Operation Marabunta": Spanish Legion and army regiments withdrew 12 kilometers from the border, establishing a fortified line of minefields and defensive entrenchments north of Daoura to protect the capital, El Aaiún.

The Flag of Morocco waved alongside copies of the Qur'an by marchers.

On the evening of 5 November, Hassan II gave the radio broadcast order to advance. At 10:33 am on 6 November 1975, the first echelon of some 40,000 civilians, led by Prime Minister Ahmed Osman, cut through barbed wire at the border post of Tah, overrunning the abandoned station and entering Spanish Sahara chanting religious and patriotic slogans. They advanced ten kilometers before halting in front of the Spanish minefield line, setting up makeshift camps where they spent the night facing Spanish troops who were under orders not to fire unless provoked.

=== Diplomatic escalation and withdrawal (7–10 November) ===
The UN Security Council met urgently, adopting Resolution 379 and, on 6 November, the stronger Resolution 380, which deplored the march and called on Morocco to withdraw all participants immediately across its international border.

Hassan II escalated pressure on 7 November by sending a second column of 100,000 marchers across the border from Abattekh toward Hagunia, and deploying a third group from Zag to threaten the Spanish garrison at Mahbes with encirclement. To prevent accidental skirmishes along the minefields from escalating into war, Spanish Minister of the Presidency Antonio Carro Martínez flew to Agadir on 8 November to negotiate with Hassan II.

A tacit compromise was reached during the talks: the King agreed to withdraw civilian marchers, and in return Spain committed to open immediate bilateral negotiations over the territory's handover, excluding the UN and the Polisario Front. On 9 November, Hassan II announced the conclusion of the march via radio:

Our wish has been fulfilled. We have performed our duty and the march has reached its objective; nothing remains for us now but to return to our starting point to study the continuation of our claims and rights.

— Hassan II of Morocco, speech of 9 November 1975.

Starting on 10 November, civilian columns orderly retreated to the staging camps at Tarfaya and were demobilized and returned to their home provinces by 18 November.

== The Moroccan arguments for sovereignty ==
According to Morocco, the exercise of sovereignty by the Moroccan state was characterized by official pledges of allegiance to the sultan. The Moroccan government was of the opinion that this allegiance existed during several centuries before the Spanish occupation and that it was a legal and political tie. The sultan Hassan I, for example, had carried out two expeditions in 1886 in order to put an end to foreign incursions in this territory and to officially invest several caids and cadis. In its presentation to the ICJ, the Moroccan side also mentioned the levy of taxes as a further instance of the exercise of sovereignty. The exercise of this sovereignty had also appeared, according to the Moroccan government, at other levels, such as the appointment of local officials (governors and military officers), and the definition of the missions which were assigned to them.

The Moroccan government further pointed to several treaties between it and other states, such as with Spain in 1861, the United States of America in 1786 and 1836, and with the United Kingdom in 1856.

The ICJ found that while legal ties of allegiance existed between the Sultan and some nomadic tribes, "neither the internal nor the international acts relied upon by Morocco indicate the existence at the relevant period of either the existence or the international recognition of legal ties of territorial sovereignty between Western Sahara and the Moroccan State".

== The Madrid Accords and aftermath ==
On 14 November 1975, one week before Franco's death, representatives of Spain, Morocco, and Mauritania secretly signed the Tripartite Agreement of Madrid. Spain agreed to relinquish administrative responsibility over the territory, establishing a temporary tripartite administration that would terminate with Spain's final withdrawal by 28 February 1976.

Under the agreement, Spain retained fishing rights in territorial waters and a 35% concession in the Bou Craa phosphate mines. Spanish Sahara was partitioned between the two claiming states:

- Morocco: annexed the northern two-thirds of the territory (Saguia el-Hamra and northern Río de Oro), including the capital El Aaiún.
- Mauritania: took control of the southern third, renaming it Tiris al-Gharbiyya (including Dakhla).

An assembly of local tribal notables (the Djema'a), meeting in El Aaiún on 26 February 1976 under Moroccan oversight, voted to approve the partition. The previous day, Spain's permanent representative to the UN, Jaime de Piniés, formally communicated the termination of Spanish presence, but noted that complete decolonization would only be achieved when the Sahrawi population validly expressed their will through a free self-determination vote.

=== Outbreak of the Western Sahara War ===
Map of the Moroccan berms built in Western Sahara. Yellow denotes areas controlled by the Polisario Front.

Following Spain's military withdrawal, Moroccan forces occupied major towns, leading to direct armed conflict with the Polisario Front, which was supported with troops and logistics by Algeria (clashing with Moroccan troops at the First Battle of Amgala in January 1976). A large portion of the Sahrawi population fled across the desert to refugee camps in Tindouf, southwestern Algeria.

On 27 February 1976, the Polisario Front proclaimed the creation of the Sahrawi Arab Democratic Republic (SADR) at Bir Lehlou. This triggered the 15-year Western Sahara War, which forced Mauritania—economically drained by guerrilla warfare—to renounce its territorial claims and sign a peace treaty with Polisario in August 1979. Morocco immediately occupied and annexed the southern sector evacuated by Mauritania. Armed hostilities continued until a UN-brokered ceasefire took effect in 1991, accompanied by the deployment of the MINURSO peacekeeping mission, though the planned self-determination referendum has not yet taken place.

== International law and current status ==
In international law, the Green March and the subsequent administration of Western Sahara remain subjects of legal dispute:

- Morocco: Argues that the mobilization was a legitimate act to restore national territorial integrity based on historical ties of allegiance (bay'a) recognized by the ICJ. In 2007, Morocco submitted an autonomy plan to the UN offering regional self-governance under Moroccan sovereignty.
- United Nations and African Union: The UN has never recognized the validity of the Madrid Accords. According to a 2002 legal opinion by the UN Under-Secretary-General for Legal Affairs, a treaty among administering powers cannot unilaterally transfer sovereignty over a non-self-governing territory; therefore, Spain remains legally regarded as the de jure administering power. UN General Assembly resolutions consistently characterize Moroccan presence in the territory as an "occupation". The SADR was admitted as a full member state of the African Union, prompting Morocco to withdraw from the continental organization from 1984 until its readmission in 2017.
- Spain: The traditional position of Spanish democratic governments had been to support the UN-requested self-determination referendum. However, according to US Department of State diplomatic cables leaked by WikiLeaks, Spain under Prime Minister Zapatero began unofficially backing the Moroccan position and attempting to broker an agreement between the parties—a shift denied on 15 December 2010 by Foreign Minister Trinidad Jiménez, who told Parliament that Spain remained neutral and would support any mutual agreement between Morocco and Polisario. The formal policy reversal culminated in March 2022, when Prime Minister Pedro Sánchez officially endorsed Morocco's 2007 autonomy initiative as the "most serious, realistic, and credible basis" for resolving the dispute, leading to diplomatic and commercial disputes with Algeria and condemnation from Sahrawi organizations.

== See also ==
- History of Western Sahara
- List of Spanish colonial wars in Morocco
- Moroccan settlers

== Bibliography ==
- Arasa, Daniel (2008). Historias curiosas del franquismo. Ediciones Robinbook. ISBN 978-84-7927-979-0.
- Barreñada, Isaías (2022). Breve Historia del Sáhara Occidental. Catarata. ISBN 978-84-1352-496-2.
- Bereketeab, Redie (2014). Self-Determination and Secession in Africa: The Post-Colonial State. Taylor & Francis. ISBN 978-1-317-64969-4.
- Hodges, Tony (1983). Western Sahara: The Roots of a Desert War. Westport: Lawrence Hill Company.
- Kusserow, Mourad (2012). Schicksal Agadir – Maghrebinische Abenteuer. Mainz: Verlag Donata Kinzelbach. ISBN 978-3-942490-07-8.
- Lehmann, Ingeborg (2001). Marokko. Ostfildern: Baedeker. ISBN 3-87504-412-6.
- López García, Bernabé (2022). Rebelarse en el desierto. Movilizaciones políticas en el Oeste Sahariano [1932-2020]. Bellaterra.
- López García, Bernabé (1997). El mundo arabo-islámico contemporáneo: Una historia política. Madrid: Síntesis. ISBN 84-7738-488-6.
- Omar, Emboirik Ahmed (2017). El Movimiento Nacionalista Saharaui: De Zemla a la Organización de la Unidad Africana. Mercurio. ISBN 978-84-947323-6-2.
- Payne, Stanley G.; Palacios, Jesús (2014). Franco: una biografía personal y política. Barcelona: Espasa. ISBN 978-84-670-0992-7.
- Rogan, Eugene (2018). Los Árabes. Del Imperio Otomano a la Actualidad. Planeta. ISBN 9788417067700.
- von Tabouillot, Werner (1990). Der Grüne Marsch im Lichte des Völkerrechts. Munich. ISBN 3-88259-724-0.
