= Zaouiet Kounta =

Zaouiet Kounta زاوية كنتة
- Commune and town
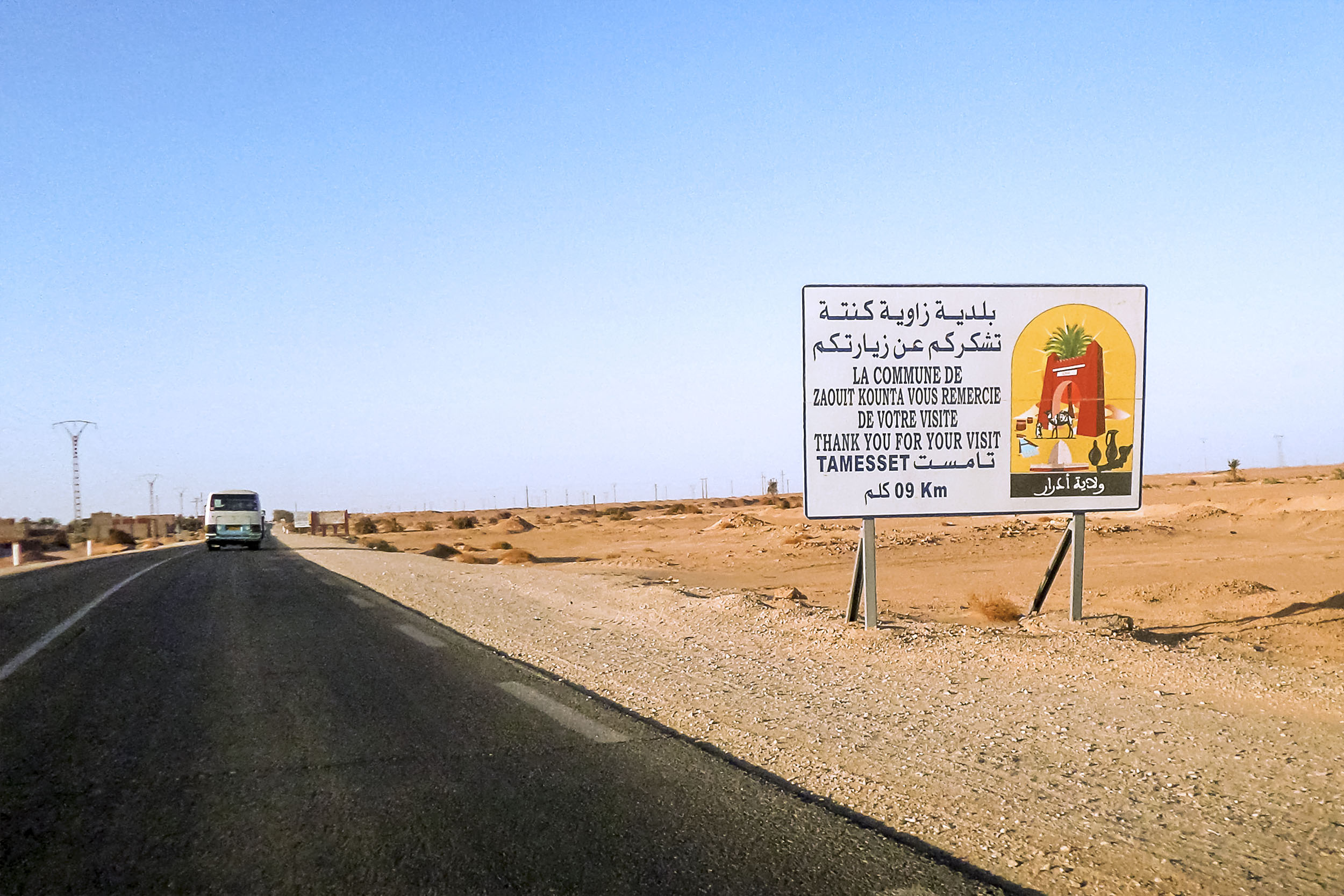

- Location within Algeria
- Coordinates: 27°13′N 0°12′W
- Country: Algeria
- Province: Adrar Province
- District: Zaouiet Kounta District
- Time zone: UTC+1 (CET)

Zaouiet Kounta (Arabic: زاوية كنتة) is a town in southern Algeria.

== Localities of the commune ==
The commune is composed of 17 localities:

- Zaouiet Kounta
- Mekkid
- Tiouririne
- Adreur
- Zaglou Arab
- Zaglou Merabitine
- Ouled El Hadj
- Taberkant
- Menacir
- Takhfift
- Admeur
- Tazoult
- Bouzegzad
- Zaouiet Cheikh
- Bouali
- Aghermamellal
- Azoua
