= Kerzaz =

Town in Béchar, Algeria

Kerzaz كرزاز
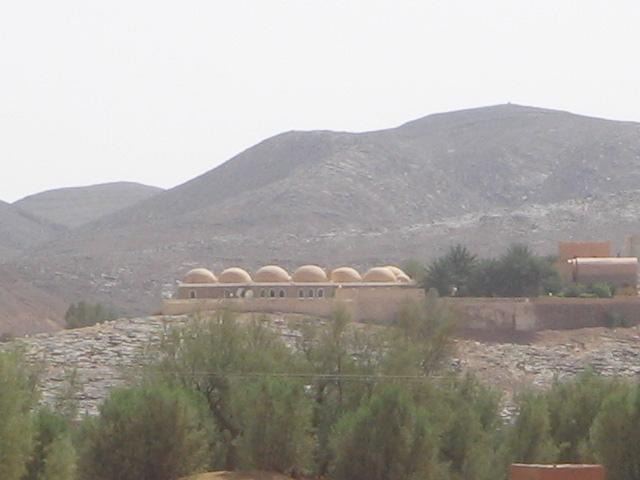
- View of Ougarta chains from Kerzaz

- Location of Kerzaz commune within Béchar Province

- Location within Algeria
- Coordinates: 29°27′N 1°25′W
- Country: Algeria
- Province: Béchar
- Province: Kerzaz District

Area
  - Total: 10,520 km^{2} (4,060 sq mi)
- Elevation: 397 m (1,302 ft)

Population (2008)
  - Total: 5,028
- Time zone: UTC+1 (West Africa Time)

Kerzaz (Arabic: كرزاز) is a town and commune, and capital of Kerzaz District, in Béchar Province, western Algeria. According to the 2008 census its population is 5,028, up from 4,276 in 1998, and its annual growth rate is 1.7%. The commune covers an area of 10,520 square kilometres (4,060 sq mi).

== Geography ==
Kerzaz lies on the left (northeast) bank of the Oued Saoura in the Saoura valley. The Grand Erg Occidental, a large area of continuous sand dunes lies to the east, while the rocky ridges of the Ougarta Range rise to the west, running from northwest to southeast along the opposite side of the river from the town.

== Climate ==
Kerzaz has a hot desert climate, with extremely hot summers and mild winters, and very little precipitation throughout the year.

Climate data for Kerzaz
Month	Jan	Feb	Mar	Apr	May	Jun	Jul	Aug	Sep	Oct	Nov	Dec	Year
Mean daily maximum °C (°F)	19.2 (66.6)	22.3 (72.1)	26.6 (79.9)	31.5 (88.7)	35.9 (96.6)	41.6 (106.9)	45.2 (113.4)	43.5 (110.3)	38.8 (101.8)	31.5 (88.7)	24.5 (76.1)	18.7 (65.7)	31.6 (88.9)
Daily mean °C (°F)	11.6 (52.9)	14.4 (57.9)	18.7 (65.7)	23.3 (73.9)	27.7 (81.9)	33.1 (91.6)	36.6 (97.9)	35.3 (95.5)	31.1 (88.0)	24.2 (75.6)	17.6 (63.7)	12.1 (53.8)	23.8 (74.9)
Mean daily minimum °C (°F)	4 (39)	6.6 (43.9)	10.8 (51.4)	15.1 (59.2)	19.5 (67.1)	24.6 (76.3)	28 (82)	27.1 (80.8)	23.4 (74.1)	16.9 (62.4)	10.7 (51.3)	5.6 (42.1)	16.0 (60.8)
Average precipitation mm (inches)	5 (0.2)	5 (0.2)	8 (0.3)	3 (0.1)	2 (0.1)	0 (0)	1 (0.0)	1 (0.0)	2 (0.1)	5 (0.2)	7 (0.3)	6 (0.2)	45 (1.7)
Source: climate-data.org

== Economy ==
Agriculture is the main industry in Kerzaz. The commune has a total of 541 hectares (1,340 acres) of arable land, of which 332 hectares (820 acres) is irrigated. There are a total of 63,570 date palms planted in the commune. As of 2009 there were 1,145 sheep, 575 goats, 228 camels, and 20 cattle.

== Infrastructure and housing ==
95% of Kerzaz's population is connected to drinking water, 95% is connected to the sewerage system, and 87% (including 1,161 buildings) have access to electricity. There is one fuel service station in the town.

Kerzaz has a total of 840 houses, of which 680 are occupied, giving an occupation rate of 7.4 inhabitants per occupied building.

== Transportation ==
Kerzaz is on the N6 national highway between Béchar to the northwest and Adrar to the southeast. Towns accessible to the north via the N6 include Béni Ikhlef, El Ouata, Béni Abbès and Igli, while to the south the towns of Timoudi, Ouled Khoudir and Ksabi can be accessed.

There is a total length of 42.6 kilometres (26.5 mi) of roads in the commune.

== Education ==
There are 4 elementary schools, with 34 classrooms including 20 in use. There are a total of 1,076 school students.

4.9% of the population has a tertiary education, and another 18.7% has competed secondary education. The overall literacy rate is 78.5%, and is 90.7% among males and 66.9% among females.

== Health ==
Kerzaz has 2 polyclinics, 2 room care facilities, and a maternity ward.

== Religion ==
Kerzaz has 3 operational mosques, with another 1 under construction.

== Localities ==
The commune is composed of three localities:

- Kerzaz Megsem
- Zaouia el Kbira
- Kerzaz Ksar

Kerzaz Megsem is at the location where the N6 highway departs from the Oued Saoura and enters the Ougarta Range. Kerzaz Ksar is slightly downstream, while Zaouia el Kbira is 8 kilometres (5.0 mi) upstream.
