= Hassi Abdallah, Algeria =

Hassi Abdallah
- Village
- Location within Algeria
- Coordinates: 29°1′43″N 0°54′52″W
- Country: Algeria
- Province: Béni Abbès Province
- District: Ouled Khoudir District
- Commune: Ksabi
- Elevation: 330 m (1,080 ft)
- Time zone: UTC+1 (CET)

Hassi Abdallah is a village in the commune of Ksabi, in Ouled Khoudir District, Béni Abbès Province, Algeria. The village is located on the northeast bank of the Oued Saoura 10 kilometres (6.2 mi) southeast of Ksabi. It is connected both Ksabi and the N6 national highway by local roads.
