= United Nations Security Council Resolution 377 =

UN Security Council Resolution 377
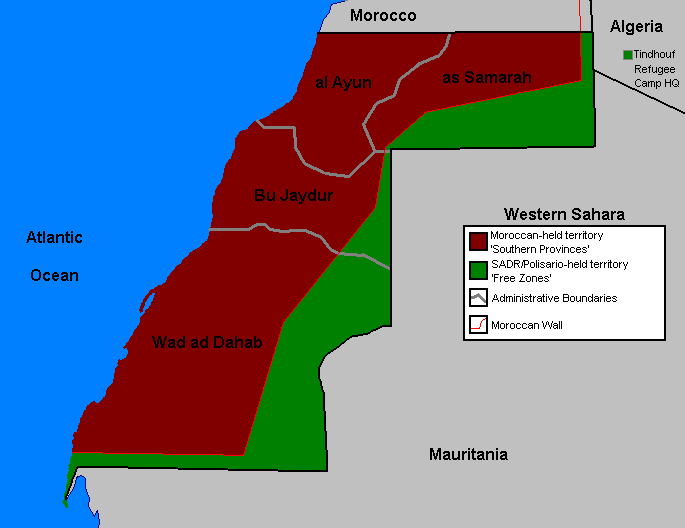
- Western Sahara (Moroccan Wall in red)
- Date: 22 October 1975
- Meeting no.: 1,850
- Code: S/RES/377 (Document)
- Subject: Western Sahara
- Result: Adopted

Security Council composition
- Permanent members: China; France; Soviet Union; United Kingdom; United States
- Non-permanent members: Byelorussian SSR; Cameroon; Costa Rica; Guyana; Iraq; Italy; Japan; Mauritania; Sweden; Tanzania

United Nations Security Council Resolution 377, adopted on 22 October 1975, dealt with the situation in Western Sahara. The Council reaffirmed recent work by the General Assembly and noted a letter from the Permanent Representative of Spain. The Council then invoked Article 34 of the UN Charter to request the Secretary-General enter into immediate consultations with the parties concerned and interested and to report to the Security Council as soon as possible on the results.

The Council stressed it did not want to prejudice any negotiations which the General Assembly might undertake and appealed to the parties concerned and interested to exercise restraint and moderation.

No details of the vote were given, other than that it was "adopted by consensus".

The resolution was adopted in the wake of Morocco's invasion of Western Sahara and annexation to the country, in the aftermath of Spain's abandonment of the territory. The United Nations refused to recognise the claim; the Council reaffirmed United Nations General Assembly Resolution 1514 of 14 December 1960 and all other resolutions over the territory.

== See also ==
- List of United Nations Security Council Resolutions 301 to 400 (1971–1976)
- United Nations visiting mission to Spanish Sahara
- Western Sahara War
