= Bidhan =

Bidhan may refer to:

Given name

- Bidhan Chandra Roy (1882–1962), Chief Minister of West Bengal, India
- Bidhan Lama, Olympic taekwondo practitioner from Nepal

Middle name

- Kalyan Bidhan Sinha (born 1944), Indian mathematician

Places

- Bidhan Sarani, street in Kolkata, India

Others

- Bidhan Chandra Krishi Viswavidyalaya, university in West Bengal, India
- Bidhan Chandra College, Asansol, West Bengal, India
- Bidhan Chandra College, Rishra, West Bengal, India

== See also ==
- Vidhāna, Vedic texts of Hinduism
- Vidhan Sabha, state legislative assemblies in India
  - Vidhan Bhavan (disambiguation), the buildings housing these
