= Zaouiet Kounta District =

Zaouiet Kounta District دائرة زاوية كنتة
- District
- Coordinates: 27°13′N 12°0′W
- Country: Algeria
- Province: Adrar Province
- Capital: Zaouiet Kounta
- Time zone: UTC+1 (CET)

Zaouiet Kounta District is a district of Adrar Province, Algeria.

== Communes ==
The district is further divided into 2 communes:

- Zaouiet Kounta
- In Zghmir
