= Timoudi =

Timoudi ﺗﻴﻤﻮدى
- Commune and town
- Location of Timoudi commune within Béchar Province

- Location of Timoudi within Algeria
- Coordinates: 29°19′N 1°8′W
- Country: Algeria
- Province: Béchar Province
- District: Kerzaz District

Area
  - Total: 6,175 km^{2} (2,384 sq mi)
- Elevation: 359 m (1,178 ft)

Population (2008)
  - Total: 2,389
  - Density: 0.3869/km^{2} (1.002/sq mi)
- Time zone: UTC+1 (CET)

Timoudi (Arabic: ﺗﻴﻤﻮدى) is a town and commune in Kerzaz District, Béchar Province, in western Algeria. According to the 2008 census its population is 2,389, up from 2,116 in 1998, with an annual population growth rate of 1.2%. The area of the commune is 6,175 square kilometres (2,384 sq mi).

== Geography ==
Timoudi lies at 359 metres (1,178 ft) in the Saoura valley on the banks of Oued Saoura, a wadi that marks the western edge of the Grand Erg Occidental, a large area of sand dunes in the Sahara desert.

== Climate ==
Timoudi has a hot desert climate (Köppen climate classification BWh), with extremely hot summers and cool winters, and very little precipitation throughout the year.

== Economy ==
Agriculture is the main industry in Timoudi. The commune has a total of 571 hectares (1,410 acres) of arable land, of which 366 hectares (900 acres) is irrigated. There are a total of 54,000 date palms planted in the commune. As of 2009 there were 1,009 sheep, 684 goats, 45 camels, and 10 cattle.

== Infrastructure and housing ==
95% of Timoudi's population is connected to drinking water, 95% is connected to the sewerage system, and 90% (including 729 buildings) have access to electricity. There are no fuel service stations in the town; the nearest is in Kerzaz.

Timoudi has a total of 628 houses, of which 204 are occupied, giving an occupation rate of 11.7 inhabitants per occupied building, by far the highest in the province.

== Transportation ==
Timoudi is located 9 kilometres (5.6 mi) from the N6 highway, on a local road that leads northeast from the highway to the town. The town of Ouled Khoudir is 11 kilometres (7 mi) southeast of Timoudi, while the town of Kerzaz is 34 kilometres (21 mi) to the northwest, and 60 kilometres (37 mi) by road. Timoudi is 391 kilometres (243 mi) from the provincial capital, Béchar.

There is a total length of 42.2 kilometres (26.2 mi) of roads in the commune.

== Education ==
There are 3 elementary schools, with 21 classrooms including 15 in use. There are a total of 634 school students.

4.3% of the population has a tertiary education, and another 16.7% has competed secondary education. The overall literacy rate is 72.3%, and is 86.4% among males and 58.3% among females.

== Health ==
Timoudi has 3 room care facilities, but otherwise few healthcare services are available. The nearest polyclinic is in Ouled Khoudir, and the nearest hospital is in Béni Abbès.

== Religion ==
Timoudi has 5 operational mosques.

== Localities ==
The commune is composed of four localities:

- Timoudi
- Boutarfaya
- Ben-Abdelkader
- Lemouih
