= Sebkha el Melah, El Menia =

Salt lake in El Menia Province, Algeria

Sebkha el Melah
- Location within Algeria
- Location: El Menia Province, Algeria
- Coordinates: 30°30′0″N 2°55′0″E
- Type: Endorheic salt lake
- Basin countries: Algeria

Ramsar Wetland
- Official name: Sebkhet El Melah
- Designated: 12 December 2004
- Reference no.: 1429

Location of Sebkha el Melah in Algeria

Sebkha el Melah, also known as Sebkhel el Melah or Sebkhet el Melah, is an endorheic salt lake in El Menia Province, central Algeria.

== Geography ==
Sebkha el Melah is a salt lake that has formed in a basin in El Menia Province in central Algeria. It consists of two bodies of water, the upper one pond-like, with a moderate degree of salinity and a biodiverse flora and fauna, and the lower one a sabkha or salt lake, with higher salinity, salt-encrusted margins and very little vegetation.

== Ecology ==
Sebkha el Melah has been designated as a Ramsar site since 2004. The area of the Ramsar site is 18,947 hectares (46,820 acres), the soils of the southern basin are saline and the vegetation sparse. On land there are stands of tamarisk and various species of seed-bearing plants. Some agricultural activities take place, including the cultivation of date palms. Several species of reptile and amphibian are found in the northern basin, as well as crustaceans, fish and small mammals. The site is of international importance because of the waterfowl that breed and raise their young here. The lakes are particularly productive because of the high temperatures experienced; more than 1% of the world populations of the ruddy shelduck (Tadorna ferruginea) and the ferruginous duck (Aythya nyroca) breed at Sebkha el Melah.
