= 1975 United Nations visiting mission to Spanish Sahara =

To assist in the decolonization process of the Spanish Sahara (now Western Sahara), a colony in North Africa, the United Nations General Assembly in 1975 dispatched a visiting mission to the territory and the surrounding countries, in accordance with its resolution 3292 (December 13, 1974).

== Purpose of the visiting mission ==
The mission intended to investigate the political situation in the Spanish Sahara, as well as the conflicting claims to the territory:

- Spain had administered the Spanish Sahara since the Berlin Congress in 1884, but had announced it was pulling out of the territory. A Madrid-backed political party, the Partido de Unión Nacional Saharaui (PUNS), argued for a gradual transition to independence and demanded privileged relations between Spain and a future Western Sahara.
- The Polisario Front, an indigenous anti-colonial organization that was waging a guerrilla war against Spanish forces since 1973, claimed the country for its inhabitants, the Sahrawis, and demanded immediate independence.
- Morocco invoked historical ties between its royal family and the Sahrawi tribes, claiming the territory as its Southern Provinces.
- Mauritania referred to common ethnicity (of Sahrawis and Moors) and historical territorial connections, to claim it as a northern part of the country; Tiris al-Gharbiyya.
- The United Nations had since 1966 demanded that a referendum among the native population should determine the future status of the territory.

== The mission ==
The mission was composed of three members. Its head was Simeon Aké, UN ambassador of the Côte d'Ivoire (Ivory Coast); accompanying him were Marta Jiménez Martinez, a Cuban diplomat, and Manouchehr Pishva, from Iran.

It toured the Spanish Sahara on May 12–19, 1975, after initially having been denied entry by Spanish authorities. On May 8–12 and again on May 20–22, it visited Madrid, Spain; and from May 28 to June 1, it toured the neighbouring countries Mauritania, Morocco and Algeria; in Algeria - which supported the Polisario since late 1974 - it also met with leaders of the Polisario Front.

== Findings of the mission ==
=== Western Sahara ===
In the territory, the mission encountered opposing demonstrations by the Polisario Front and the PUNS, both demanding independence, but differing in their approach to the Spanish authorities. Tony Hodges writes:

During its visit to the territory," [the UN mission] reported, "the mission did not encounter any groups supporting the territorial claims of neighbouring countries and consequently had no say of estimating the extent of their support, which appeared to be submerged by the massive demonstrations in favour of independence.

and

Although the mission met privately with a number of groups in the northern region representing PUNS," the UN envoys noted, "it did not witness any separate public demonstrations in support of that party. This was in marked contrast to the Frente Polisario, whose supporters from the onset appeared en masse carrying the flags and emblems of their movement. It was not until the mission visited the southern region that PUNS, following the example of its opponents, organized mass demonstrations to greet the mission at each place visited."

and

At Villa Cisneros and other settlements in the south, Polisario and PUNS supporters staged separate, rival demonstrations, but "although both groups mustered a large number of supporters," the mission noted, "the preponderance was clearly in favour of the Frente Polisario." The placards of Polisario and PUNS were "similar," for "both demanded complete independence for the territory and opposed integration with neighbouring countries."

and

Owing to the large measure of cooperation which it received from the Spanish authorities, the Mission was able, despite the shortness of its stay in the Territory, to visit virtually all the main population centers and to ascertain the views of the overwhelming majority of their inhabitants. At every place visited, the Mission was met by mass political demonstrations and had numerous private meetings with representatives of every section of the Saharan community. From all these, it became evident to the Mission that there was an overwhelming consensus among Saharans within the Territory in favour of independence and opposing integration with any neighbouring country [...] The Mission believes, in the light of what it witnessed in the Territory, especially the mass demonstrations of support for one movement, the Frente Polisario [...] that its visit served as a catalyst to bring into the open political forces and pressures which had previously been largely submerged. It was all the more significant to the Mission that this came as a surprise to the Spanish authorities who, until then, had only been partly aware of the profound political awakening of the population.

The mission estimated the largest demonstration they witnessed, "organized by the Frente Polisario", in El-Aaiun on May 13, 1975, to have consisted of 15,000 people - significant, since a 1974 census by the Spanish authorities had set the total population at just below 75,000 people.

=== Surrounding nations ===
- In Mauritania, the mission met with President Moktar Ould Daddah in Nouakchott, where he reiterated his demand for the integration of the territory into Mauritania. The mission also travelled to the northern towns of Atar, Zouerate, Bir Moghrein, and Nouadhibou, where they witnessed "large rival demonstrations" by the Parti du Peuple Mauritanien (PPM; Ould Daddah's ruling party) and the Polisario Front.
- In Fes, King Hassan II repeated the Moroccan claim to the territory, and the mission witnessed "large pro-annexation demonstrations in towns in the far south of the country, near the Western Saharan border" that "left in no doubt [...] the depth of popular support in Morocco for Hassan's campaign of 'reunification,' as well as his governments determination to achieve its objectives. The mission was informed that Morocco would not accept the inclusion of independence among the options to be put to the Western Saharans in a referendum. The only acceptable question was: 'Do you want to remain under the authority of Spain or to rejoin Morocco?'"
- In Algeria, President Houari Boumedienne stated that "Algeria had no interest in Western Sahara other than to see the Sahrawi's right to self-determination respected". The mission also visited the Sahrawi communities in Tindouf, Oum el-Assel and Hassi Abdallah in Algeria, where they "were met by thousands of pro-POLISARIO demonstrators" and were shown Spanish officers of the Tropas Nómadas, held as prisoners-of-war by POLISARIO forces. POLISARIO General Secretary El-Ouali Mustapha Sayed stated that "a referendum was unnecessary since it was now evident that the majority of Saharawis wanted independence, but [...] said that that they would accept one, if the UN insisted, on condition that the Spanish administration had first been withdrawn and replaced by a 'national' administration, that all Spanish troops had been withdrawn and replaced by POLISARIO soldiers under UN and Arab League guarantees, and that all refugees had been allowed to return to the territory".

== Consequences of the mission report ==
The mission presented its report to the United Nations on October 15, 1975. The results of the investigation were cited especially by the Polisario Front and its Algerian backers as supportive of their argument, but the debate was largely submerged by the presentation of the opinion of the International Court of Justice on October 16. The court argued that while there were historical ties between both Mauritania and Morocco to the tribes and lands of Spanish Sahara, neither country's claim sufficed to grant it ownership of the territory. The court also ruled that the Sahrawis possessed a right of self-determination, meaning that any solution to the problem of the status of Spanish Sahara had to be approved by the Sahrawi public. (A position regarded as supportive of the referendum.) As a response to the ICJ verdict, King Hassan II of Morocco announced within hours of the release of the court's findings, that he would organize a Green March into Spanish Sahara to assume ownership of the territory.

== See also ==
- Spanish Sahara
- Western Sahara
- History of Western Sahara
- Green March
- International Court of Justice Advisory Opinion on Western Sahara
- Sahrawi nationalism

== UN General Assembly archive number ==
The mission's final report is archived in the General Assembly Official Records.

- United Nations Visiting Mission to Spanish Sahara, 1975, General Assembly, 30th Session, Supplement 23, UN DocumentA/10023/Rev.
