= Ain Ben Tili =

- Location in Mauritania
- Coordinates: 25°59′40″N 9°33′12″W
- Country: Mauritania
- Region: Tiris Zemmour
- District: Bir Moghrein

Population
  - Total: less than 100

Ain Ben Tili (Arabic: عين بن تيلي) is a small village-fort in northeast Mauritania, on the border with Western Sahara. It is part of the Tiris Zemmour region.

== History ==
The fort was constructed by the French in 1934 during a campaign aimed at the pacification of the Sahara led by "General Trinquet". This was part of a larger scale French military effort to effectively occupy the interior of the Sahara (e.g. Tindouf or Smara) which were previously exempt from any foreign presence.

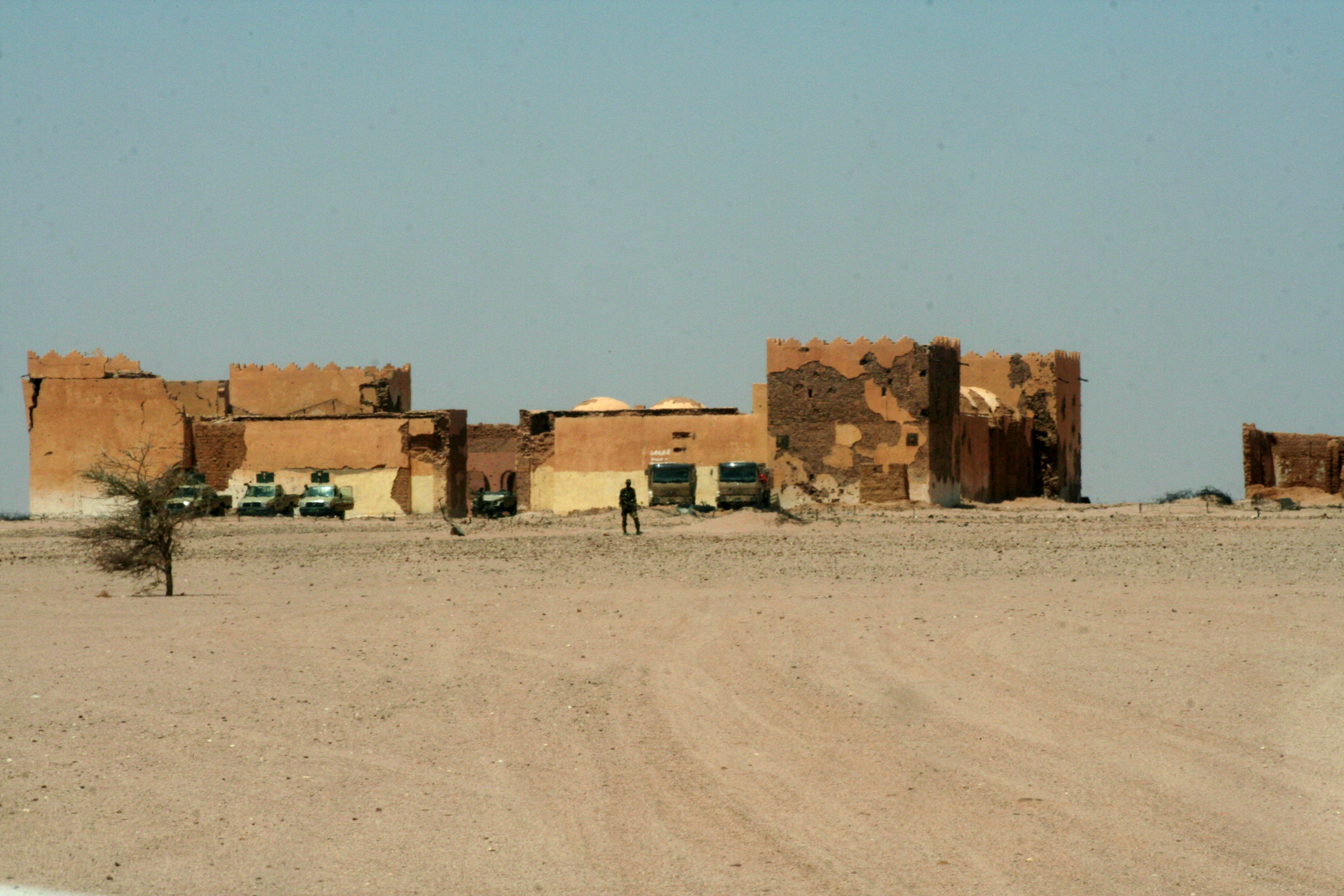
May 2010 photograph of the fort.

In 1961, the fort was returned to Mauritania which kept in there a small military garrison.

On 20 January 1976, the Polisario Front (a guerrilla movement demanding the independence of Western Sahara) surrounded and attacked the isolated fort killing the few Mauritanians which were stationed there. During this attack, a Mauritanian "Commandant" (Soueidatt Ould Weddad) was killed and a Moroccan Northrop F-5 fighter aircraft called for support was shot down by the POLISARIO. The latter kept the fort, until the Moroccan army took over it in 1977 only to abandon it two years later since it proved difficult to defend against the POLISARIO's raids.

After the 1991 cease-fire between Morocco and the Polisario Front, the United Nations' MINURSO has occasionally sheltered some of its personnel at the fort.

A French Legionnaire's grave marked by a distinctive cross is located at Ain Ben Tili; his name was "Brigadier Tison" and he died in 1934 during the building of the fort.

As of 2012, Ain Ben Tili was occupied by the Mauritanian military who are attempting to secure the border area from al-Qaeda militants based in Mali who "raid" into Northern Mauritania and are connected to the many smugglers who operate in the greater Sahara region.

== Controversy ==
On April 10, 2022, the Royal Moroccan Air Force reportedly launched a drone strike in the Free Zone on the border of the town. The drone strike was part of a series of attacks in the Free Zone in which 2 people were killed and several were badly injured. The Armed Forces of Mauritania conducted a search and rescue mission in the area looking for missing people including a child.
