= Kerzaz District =

Kerzaz District دائرة كرزاز
- District
- Location of Kerzaz within Béchar Province
- Coordinates: 29°27′N 1°25′E
- Country: Algeria
- Province: Béchar
- District seat: Kerzaz

Area
  - Total: 19,310 km^{2} (7,460 sq mi)

Population (2008)
  - Total: 9,876
  - Density: 0.5114/km^{2} (1.325/sq mi)
- Time zone: UTC+01 (CET)
- Municipalities: 3

Kerzaz is a district in Béchar Province, Algeria. It was named after its capital, Kerzaz. According to the 2008 census, the total population of the district was 9,876 inhabitants. Almost all of the population is settled near the Oued Saoura, which runs from northwest to southeast through the district. The main road, National Highway N6, also runs through the district from northwest to southeast on the way from Béchar to Adrar, Algeria.

== Municipalities ==
The district is further divided into 3 municipalities:

- Kerzaz
- Timoudi
- Béni Ikhlef
