= Ouled Khoudir =

Ouled Khoudir أوﻻد ﺧﺪﻳﺮ
- Commune and town
- Location of Ouled Khoudir commune within Béchar Province

- Location of Ouled Khoudir within Algeria
- Coordinates: 29°14′56″N 1°4′20″W
- Country: Algeria
- Province: Béchar Province

Area
  - Total: 1,920 km^{2} (740 sq mi)
- Elevation: 380 m (1,250 ft)

Population (2008)
  - Total: 4,251
  - Density: 2.21/km^{2} (5.73/sq mi)
- Time zone: UTC+1 (CET)

Ouled Khoudir (Arabic: أوﻻد ﺧﺪﻳﺮ) is a town and commune in Ouled Khoudir District, Béchar Province, in western Algeria. According to the 2008 census its population is 4,251, up from 3,893 in 1998, with an annual growth rate of 0.9%. The commune covers an area of 1,920 square kilometres (740 sq mi).

== Geography ==
Ouled Khoudir lies at 380 metres (1,250 ft) in the Saoura valley the on banks of Oued Saoura, a wadi that separates the Grand Erg Occidental, a large area of sand dunes in the Sahara desert to the east, from the rocky hills of the Ougarta Range to the west.

== Climate ==
Ouled Khoudir has a hot desert climate (Köppen climate classification BWh), with extremely hot summers and cool winters, and very little precipitation throughout the year.

Climate data for Ouled Khoudir
Month	Jan	Feb	Mar	Apr	May	Jun	Jul	Aug	Sep	Oct	Nov	Dec	Year
Mean daily maximum °C (°F)	19.4 (66.9)	22.4 (72.3)	26.8 (80.2)	31.8 (89.2)	36.0 (96.8)	41.9 (107.4)	45.3 (113.5)	43.8 (110.8)	39.3 (102.7)	31.8 (89.2)	24.7 (76.5)	18.6 (65.5)	31.8 (89.3)
Daily mean °C (°F)	11.8 (53.2)	14.6 (58.3)	18.7 (65.7)	23.5 (74.3)	27.7 (81.9)	33.3 (91.9)	36.6 (97.9)	35.4 (95.7)	31.5 (88.7)	24.4 (75.9)	17.8 (64.0)	12.2 (54.0)	24.0 (75.1)
Mean daily minimum °C (°F)	4.2 (39.6)	6.8 (44.2)	10.7 (51.3)	15.3 (59.5)	19.5 (67.1)	24.8 (76.6)	28.0 (82.4)	27.1 (80.8)	23.7 (74.7)	17.1 (62.8)	10.9 (51.6)	5.8 (42.4)	16.2 (61.1)
Average precipitation mm (inches)	3 (0.1)	4 (0.2)	6 (0.2)	2 (0.1)	1 (0.0)	0 (0)	0 (0)	1 (0.0)	2 (0.1)	4 (0.2)	5 (0.2)	4 (0.2)	32 (1.3)
Source: climate-data.org

== Economy ==
Agriculture is the main industry in Ouled Khoudir. The commune has a total of 1,635 hectares (4,040 acres) of arable land, of which 394 hectares (970 acres) is irrigated. There are a total of 130,700 date palms planted in the commune. As of 2009 there were 1,935 sheep, 843 goats, 198 camels, and 12 cattle. There were also 1800 chickens in 1 building.

== Transportation ==
Ouled Khoudir is located 8 kilometres (5.0 mi) from the N6 highway, on a local road that leads northeast to the town. The town of Timoudi is 11 kilometres (7 mi) northwest of Ouled Khoudir. Ouled Khoudir is 385 kilometres (239 mi) from the provincial capital, Béchar.

== Infrastructure and housing ==
95% of Ouled Khoudir's population is connected to drinking water, 95% is connected to the sewerage system, and 99% (including 1,071 buildings) have access to electricity. There are no fuel service stations in the town; the nearest is in Kerzaz.

Ouled Khoudir has a total of 991 houses, of which 493 are occupied, giving an occupation rate of 8.6 inhabitants per occupied building, the second highest in the province after the neighbouring town of Timoudi.

There is a total length of 29.2 kilometres (18.1 mi) of roads in the commune.

== Education ==
There are 3 elementary schools, with 30 classrooms including 24 in use. There are a total of 964 school students.

4.8% of the population has a tertiary education, and another 16.2% has competed secondary education. The overall literacy rate is 74.0%, and is 85.4% among males and 62.9% among females.

== Health ==
Ouled Khoudir has one polyclinic, 5 room care facilities, and a maternity ward. The nearest hospital is in Béni Abbès.

== Religion ==
Ouled Khoudir has 5 operational mosques, with another 1 under construction.

== Localities ==
The commune is composed of five localities:

- Ouled Khodir
- Ouled Rafaa
- El Ksar
- El Khabaïb
- Meslila
