= Djema'a =

Traditional and colonial assemblies in Western Sahara

The term Djema'a (or Djemaa, meaning "Congregation" or "Gathering" in Arabic) can refer to two things in a Western Sahara context.

== Djema'a: tribal leadership ==
The Djema'a was the leading body in a Sahrawi tribe, composed of elders and elected leaders. It organized war efforts, raiding parties, lawmaking and diplomacy, among other things, and also settled disputes between members of the tribe. Sometimes, a larger assembly known as the Ait Arbein (Council of Forty) would be gathered, composed of elders from several tribes, to organize the community against foreign invasion or other such supratribal concerns.

The exact organization of the Djema'a varied from tribe to tribe, but it generally incorporated both old Berber customs, Arab traditions and based its practices on Islamic law. Women served on the Djema'a in at least some of the Sahrawi tribes.

=== Decline ===
An enduring social structure, tribalism had ruled the Sahrawis since they first appeared in the area in the Middle Ages, but a combination of colonization and modernization has gradually eroded its hold on the population.

After Spain and France invaded the territory in 1884, the Djema'as remained very active, but as the Spanish Army gradually extended its control and subdued the tribes, resistant Djema'a leaderships were killed or jailed, while others were coerced or bribed into cooperation with the colonizers. The Ma al-Aynayn uprising in the early 1900s, and the rebellions which followed, represented something of a last stand of the traditional tribal society against colonization. In the 1950s, tribal authority was slowly eroding due to urbanization and new ways of life.

Harsh Spanish repressive measures after the Ifni War, including forced settlement, accelerated this process. By 1967, Sahrawi nationalist politics were for the first time organized in a modern political party, the Harakat Tahrir. Tribal traditions and divisions remain strong in Sahrawi society, however, although the formal system of Djema'a has largely been destroyed by the appearance of modern states.

=== Government attitudes to tribalism ===
The Polisario (see below) has generally taken a hostile attitude to tribalism, arguing that it is an outdated and antidemocratic model of governance, and actively campaigned against tribalism in the Tindouf refugee camps and the areas of Western Sahara ruled by the exiled Sahrawi republic. Morocco has generally been content to extract allegiance from tribal elders in areas controlled by it, and otherwise ignored it. In Mauritania, the Sahrawi-Moorish communities are still strongly tribally organized.

== Djema'a: Spanish colonial body ==
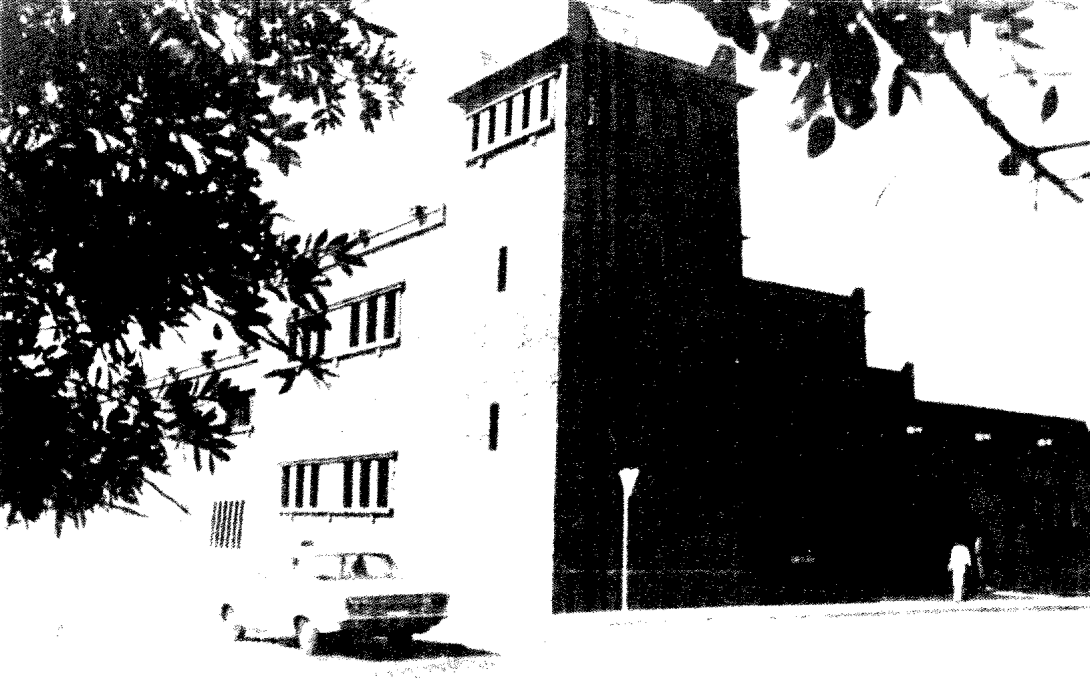
The building of the Spanish Djema'a in El Aaiún.

The Djema'a was also a ruling council of Sahrawi elders created in May 1967 by the authorities in Spanish Sahara, today Western Sahara. Djema'a officials were elected, but the colonial authorities ran the process and in effect selected the candidates. The first round of elections were held between July 14 and August 20, 1967, and the Djema'a was inaugurated on September 11 in El Aaiún. A second round Djema'a was elected in January 1971, and as the Polisario Front uprising began in 1973, it was also the last.

The members of the Djemaa often had status within tribes, but were not necessarily considered authentic representatives by the tribe membership. The Djema'a had little effective power, but was occasionally consulted by the Spanish military governors, and allowed to send representatives to Madrid. Its primary function was to provide the occupation with a facade of legality in the eyes of the Sahrawi population, drawing on traditions such as the tribal Djema'a and the Ait Arbein.

=== Dissolution ===
In 1974–75, the Djema'a lost in importance, as Spain set up a new organization in support of its policies, the Sahrawi National Union Party (PUNS), which absorbed many of the Djema'a's members, and most of its political functions. Without Spanish backing, and with Franco declaring his intent to release the territory, many of the Djema'a members hastily defected to the Polisario Front, a rebel movement which was involved in a rapidly growing guerrilla war against the Spanish presence. A smaller number also left for Morocco, to support that country's claims to Western Sahara as its Southern Provinces, and a few to Mauritania where they were presented as backers of Mauritanian rule in Tiris al-Gharbiyya. After the joint Moroccan-Mauritanian invasion of Western Sahara in late 1975, the Djema'a was dispersed in the mass exodus of refugees that followed.

=== Contending claims of legitimacy ===
A majority of its membership (67 of 102) voted on October 12, 1975 in the Polisario-backed Ain Ben Tili (Mauritania) congress to denounce the Moroccan invasion, declare support for Polisario and dissolve the Djema'a, so it would not be possible to exploit the body for political purposes. Later that year, however, the Moroccan government convened a meeting of Djema'a members in Morocco to declare support for its annexation of the territory. This was contested by the Polisario, which argued that:

- There was never a full congregation present, (they were less than a half of the total members) so there was no quorum.
- Even if there had been, the Djema'a had previously been dissolved by majority decision, and thus the Moroccan rump, Djema'a possessed no political legitimacy.

On February 27, 1976 the independence movement in Western Sahara, Polisario, proclaimed the Saharawi Arab Democratic Republic, intended to replace the Djema'a as a Sahrawi ruling body.

Although neither side recognized the Djema'a's authority when it was operative, denouncing it as a puppet of Spain, both Polisario and Morocco still use these instances of alleged Djema'a support as an argument for independence or annexation in the still ongoing Western Sahara conflict.

== See also ==
- Sahrawi nationalism
