= Ouled Khodeïr District =

Ouled Khodeïr District دائرة أولاد خضير
- District
- Location of Ouled Khodeïr within Béchar Province
- Coordinates: 29°15′N 1°3′E
- Country: Algeria
- Province: Béchar
- District seat: Ouled Khodeïr

Area
  - Total: 4,140 km^{2} (1,600 sq mi)

Population (2008)
  - Total: 7,438
  - Density: 1.80/km^{2} (4.65/sq mi)
- Time zone: UTC+01 (CET)
- Municipalities: 2

Ouled Khodeïr is a district in Béchar Province, Algeria. It was named after its capital, Ouled Khodeïr. According to the 2008 census, the total population of the district was 7,438 inhabitants. The Oued Saoura runs from northwest to southeast through the district, and empties into Sebkhel el Melah, also in the district, after a brief excursion into Adrar Province. The N6 national highway also runs through the district on the way from Béchar to Adrar, Algeria.

== Municipalities ==
The district is further divided into 2 municipalities:

- Ouled Khodeïr
- Ksabi
