= Emirate of Trarza =

Pre-colonial state in Mauritania (1640–1902)

Emirate of Trarza إمارة ترارزة
- 1640–1902
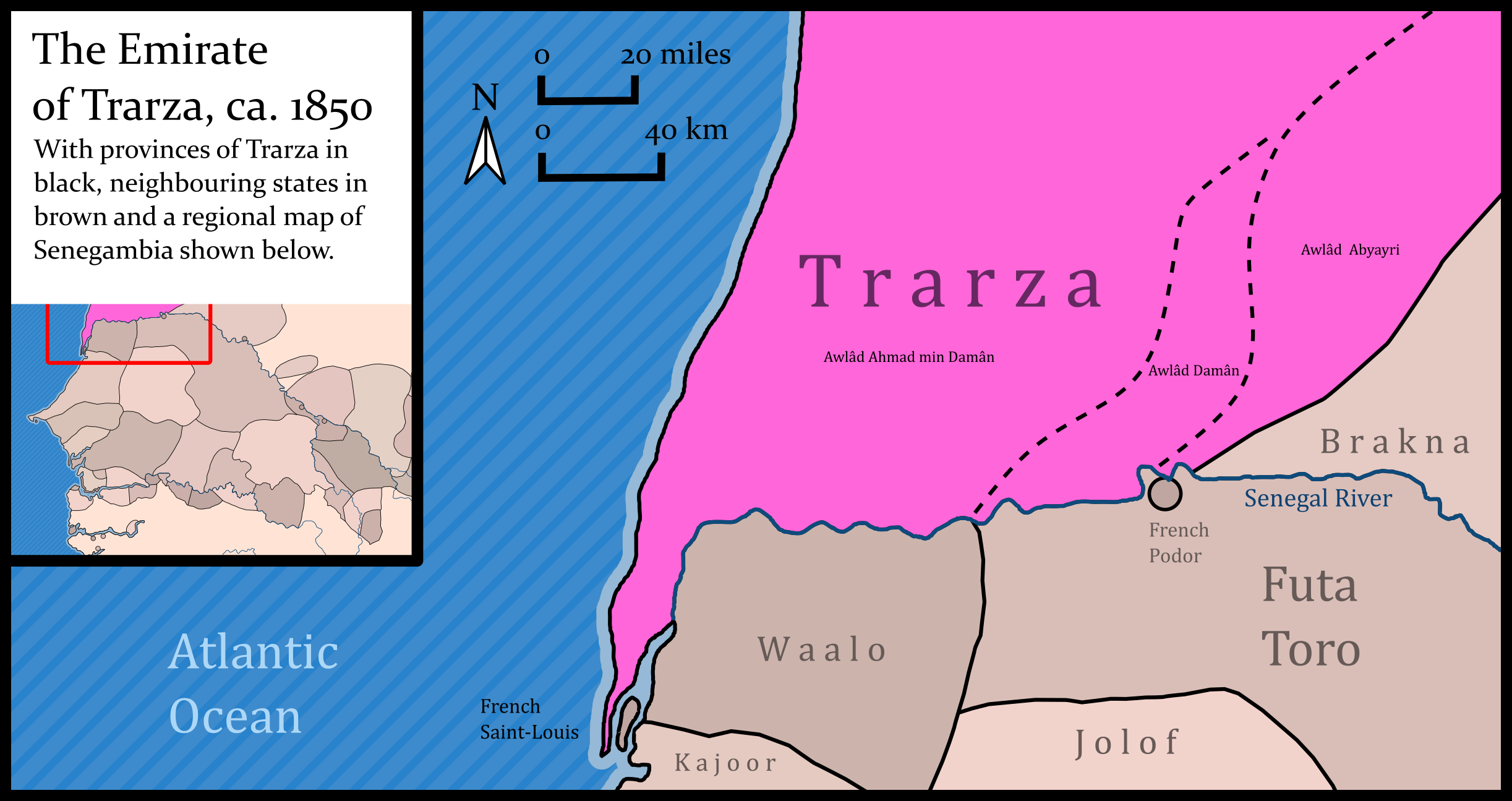
- Trarza ca. 1850
- Capital: Mederdra, Rosso
- Official languages: Arabic
- Common languages: Hassaniya, Zenaga, Wolof
- Religion: Islam
- Government: Monarchy
- Emir
- Historical era: Early Modern Period
  - Confederation founded: 1640
  - Declared a French protectorate: 1902
Succeeded by
French West Africa

The Emirate of Trarza (arabic: إمارة ترارزة) was a pre-colonial state in what is today southwest Mauritania. It has survived as a traditional confederation of semi-nomadic people to the present day. Its name is shared with the modern Region of Trarza. The population are Arab tribes.

Europeans later called these people Moors/Maures, and thus have titled this group "the Trarza Moors".

== Early history ==
Emirate of Trarza, founded in the midst of the final wars between the local nomadic Berbers and the Arab Hassanis tribes, was organized as a semi-nomadic state led by a Muslim Prince, or Emir. Trarza was one of three powerful emirates that controlled the northwest bank of the Senegal River from the 17th to the 19th centuries CE; the others were the emirates of Brakna, and the Tagant. Originally, Trarza are a clan of the Bani Hassan tribes who came in actual Mauritania during the 15th-16th centuries.

== Society and structure ==
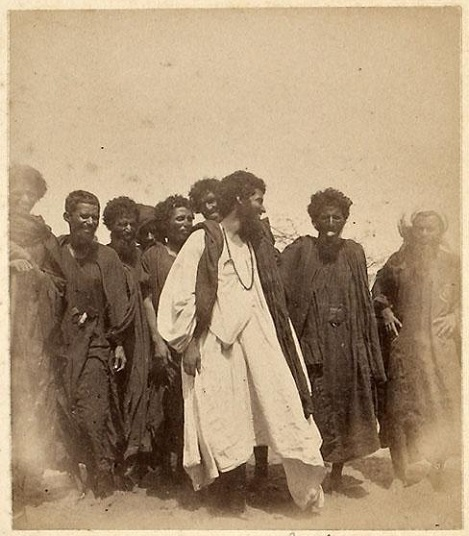
Trarzas Moors c. 1890

The Arab conquests had resulted in a society divided according to ethnicity and caste. The "warrior" lineages or clans, the Hassane, supposed descendants of the Beni Hassan Arab conquerors (cf. Oulad Delim) maintained supremacy and comprised the aristocratic upper ranks. Below them were ranked the "scholarly" or "clerical" lineages, who preserved and taught Islam. These were called marabout (by the French) or zawiya tribes (cf. Oulad Tidrarine). The zawiya tribes were protected by Hassane overlords in exchange for their religious services and payment of the horma, a tributary tax of cattle or goods. While the zawiya were exploited in a sense, the relationship was often more or less symbiotic. Under both these groups, but still part of the Western Sahara society, were the znaga tribes, people who worked in lower caste occupations, such as fishermen (cf. Imraguen), as well as peripheral semi-tribal groups working in the same fields (among them the "professional" castes, mallemin and igawen). All these groups were considered to be among the bidan, or Arab whites.

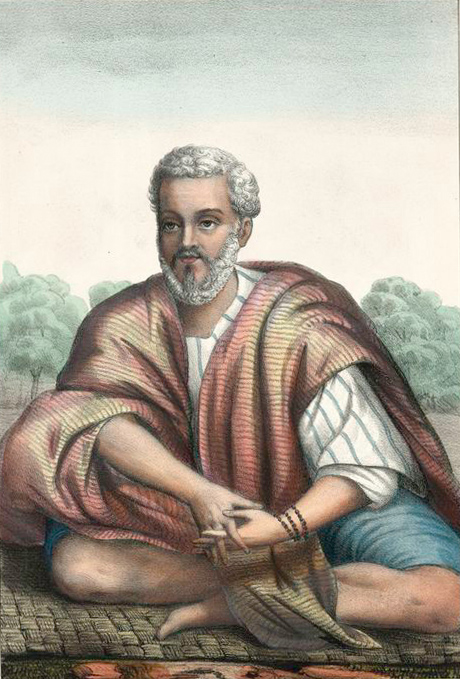
Portrait of a 'Moor prince' from Trarza, 1853

Below them were ranked groups known as Haratin, a "black" population (ethnic sub-Saharan). They are generally considered descendants of freed slaves of sub-Saharan African origins; some sources suggest they were descendants of the first inhabitants of the Sahara. (Note that Haratin, a term of obscure origin, has a different meaning in the Berber regions of Morocco.) The Haratin often lived serving affiliated bidan (white) families; in this role, they were considered part of the bidan tribe, and not having tribes of their own.

Below them were enslaved persons. These were owned individually or in family groups. At most they could hope to be freed and rise to the status of Haratin. Rich bidan families generally held a few slaves for domestic use. Nomadic societies have less use of slave labor than do sedentary societies. In some cases, the bidan used slaves to work on oasis plantations: farming dates, digging wells, etc.

These interrelated tribes controlled distinct territories: the Emirates of Trarza, Brakna, and Tagant were the political reflection of Hassane-caste tribes in southern Mauritania. At the beginning of the 20th century, the French used tensions within this system to overthrow the rulers of Trarza and its neighbors and establish colonial administration.

== Interactions with the South and Europeans: 18th century ==
In the 17th century, the French had established a trading post at the island Saint-Louis in the mouth of the Senegal River. The Bedouins of Mauritania came to control much of the trade from the interior that reached the French post. Trarza and other emirates profited from their raids against non-Muslims to their south by the seizure of slaves for sale and by the taxes they levied on Muslim states of the area. From the mid-18th to the 19th centuries, Trarza became involved deeply in the internal politics of the south bank of the Senegal. It raided and briefly conquered or backed political factions in the kingdoms of Cayor, Djolof, and Waalo.

== Trade and war: early 19th century ==
As the Atlantic Slave Trade was banned by Great Britain and the United States in 1808, Trarza and its neighbors' collected taxes on trade, especially acacia gum (Gum Arabic), which the French purchased in increasing quantities for its use in industrial fabric production. West Africa had become the sole supplier of world Gum Arabic by the 18th century. Its export at Saint-Louis doubled in amount in the decade of the 1830s alone.

Trarza's collection of taxes and its threat to bypass Saint-Louis by sending gum to the British traders at Portendick, eventually brought the Emirate into direct conflict with the French. A new emir, Muhammad al-Habib, had signed an agreement with the Waalo Kingdom, directly to the south of the river. In return for his promise of an end to raids in Waalo territory, the Emir took Njembot Mbodj, the heiress of Waalo, as a bride. The prospect that Trarza might inherit control of both banks of the Senegal struck at the security of French traders. The French initiated the Franco-Trarzan War of 1825 with a large expeditionary force that crushed Muhammad's army. As a result, the French expanded their influence to the north of the Senegal River.

== Second Franco-Trarza War ==
In the 1840s and 1850s, the French in Saint-Louis implemented expansion along the Senegal river valley by building fortified trading posts and militarily enforcing protectorate treaties with the smaller states in the territory of today's Senegal. Governor Protet began this policy, but it reached a climax under Louis Faidherbe. "The Plan of 1854" was a series of interior ministerial orders given to Governor Protet; it was developed after petitions from the powerful Bordeaux-based Maurel and Prom company, the largest shipping interest in St. Louis. It required the construction of forts upriver in order to command more territory and end African control of the acacia gum trade from the interior.

Trarza had renewed its alliance with Waalo, and Muhammed's son Ely was enthroned in Waalo as brak (king). Trarza had also formed a pact with former rival and neighbor, the Emirate of Brakna, to resist French expansion. They almost took Saint-Louis in a raid in 1855, but the French punitive expedition was swift and decisive. At the Battle of Jubuldu on 25 February 1855, the French defeated a combined Waalo and Moorish force; they formally assimilated (the then depopulated) Waalo territory into the French colony.

By 1860, Faidherbe had built a series of inland forts up the Senegal River, to Médine just below the Félou waterfall. He forced Trarza and their neighbors to accept the Senegal river as a formal boundary to their influence. But with the French defeat in the Franco-Prussian War of the 1870s, colonial expansion slowed. The Emirate of Trarza was undisturbed so long as it kept north the French possessions and did not interfere in trade. During the next thirty years, Trarza fell into internecine conflict with neighboring states over control of the Chemama, the area of agricultural settlements just north of the river. Traders in Saint-Louis profited by buying goods from Mauritania and selling the various Moorish forces weapons, and the French rarely interfered.

== Pacification: 1900-1905 ==
In 1901, French administrator Xavier Coppolani began a plan of "peaceful penetration" into the territories of Trarza and its fellow emirates. This consisted of a divide-and-conquer strategy in which the French promised the Zawiya tribes and, by extension the Haratin, greater independence and protection from the Hassane. In the space of four years (1901–1905), Coppolani traveled the area signing protectorates over much of what is now Mauritania, and beginning the expansion of French forces.

The Zawiya tribes, descendants of the earlier Berber-led tribes conquered in the 17th century, remained a religious caste within Moorish society. They produced leaders whom the French called (perhaps erroneously) marabouts. Having been disarmed for centuries, they relied upon the Hassane rulers for protection. Their leaders' grievances with Trarza's rulers were skillfully exploited by the French.

During this period, three noted marabouts had great influence in Mauritania: Shaykh Sidiya Baba, whose authority was strongest in Trarza, Brakna, and Tagant; Shaykh Saad Bu, whose importance extended to Tagant and northeast Senegal; and Shaykh Ma al Aynin, who exerted leadership in Adrar and the north, as well as in Spanish Sahara and southern Morocco. By enlisting the support of Shaykhs Sidiya and Saad against the depredations of the warrior clans and in favor of a Pax Gallica, Coppolani was able to exploit the fundamental conflicts in Maure society. He was opposed by both the French colonial administration in Senegal, which saw no value in the wastelands north of the Senegal River, and by the Saint-Louis commercial companies, to whom pacification meant the end of the lucrative arms trade. But, by 1904 Coppolani had peacefully subdued Trarza, Brakna, and Tagant; he also had established French military posts across the central region of southern Mauritania.

As Faidherbe had suggested fifty years earlier, the key to the pacification of Mauritania lay in the Adrar. There, Shaykh Ma al Aynin had begun a campaign to counteract the influence of his two rivals—the southern marabouts, Shaykhs Sidiya and Saad—and to stop the advance of the French. Because Shaykh Ma al Aynin enjoyed military as well as moral support from Morocco, the French policy of peaceful pacification gave way to active conquest. In return for support, Shaykh Ma al Aynin recognized the Moroccan sultan's claims to sovereignty over Mauritania. This action has since been the basis in the late 20th century for much of Morocco's claim to Mauritania.

In May 1905, before the French column could set out for Adrar, Coppolani was killed in Tidjikdja.

== Resistance and occupation: 1905-1934 ==
With the death of Coppolani, the tide turned in favor of Shaykh Ma al Aynin, who rallied many of the Maures with promises of Moroccan help. The French government hesitated for three years while Shaykh Ma al Aynin urged a Jihad to drive the French back across the Senegal River. In 1908 Colonel Gouraud, who had defeated a Tuareg resistance movement in the French Sudan (present day Mali), took command of French forces as the government Commissioner of the new Civil Territory of Mauritania (created in 1904). He captured Atar, and received the submission of all the Adrar peoples the following year.

In 1906 the Moroccan Sultan Moulay Abdelaziz launched a military expedition led by his cousin Moulay Idriss to reaffirm Morocco's authority over the Sahara. The campaign was supported by religious leader Ma al-Aynayn, who mobilized Saharan tribes in the Sultan's name. The Battle of Nimlane marked a symbolic Moroccan victory against the French, highlighting the strong influence of the Cherifian power in the region. Despite this success, France eventually regained the upper hand and solidified its control.

By 1912, the French had put down all resistance in Adrar and southern Mauritania. As a result of the conquest of Adrar, the French established their military ability and assured the ascendancy of the French-supported marabouts over the warrior clans within Maure society.

The fighting took a large toll on the animal herds of the nomadic Maures, who sought to replenish their herds in the traditional manner—by raiding other camps. From 1912 to 1934, French security forces repeatedly thwarted such raids. The last raid by the particularly effective and far-ranging northern nomads, the Reguibat, occurred in 1934 and covered a distance of 6,000 kilometers. They netted 800 head of cattle, 270 camels, and 10 slaves. Yet, except for minor raids and occasional attacks, the Maures generally acquiesced to French authority. They did attack Port-Etienne (present-day Nouadhibou) in 1924 and 1927.

With pacification, the French took on administering the vast territory of Mauritania.

== Important dates ==
c.1640 Trarza confederation founded.
15 Dec 1902 French protectorate.

=== List of rulers ===
Information in the table below is taken from John Stewart's African States and Rulers (Third edition, 2006).

Rulers of the Emirate of Trarza
Dates	Name	Notes
c. 1640 – c. 1660	Ahmad ibn Daman	
c. 1660 – 1703	Addi I	
1703 – 1727	Ali Sandura	
1727 – c. 1758	Umar I	
c. 1758 – ?	Mukhtar Ould Amar	
? – ?	Muhammad Babana	
? – ?	Addi II	
? – ?	Mukhtar II	
? – ?	Muhammad II	
? – c. 1800	Ali Kuri	
c. 1800 – ?	Aleit	
? – ?	Umar Kumba II	
? – ?	Muhammad III	
? – ?	Mukhtar III	
? – 1833	Umar III	
1833 – 1860	Muhammad al-Habib	Also known as Muhammad IV al-Habib
1860 – July 1871	Sidi Mbairika	
July 1871 – 1873	Ahmad Salum	
1873 – October 1886	Ely Ould Muhammad al-Habib	Also known as Sidi Ali Diombot
October – December 1886	Sheikh Muhammad Fadl	
December 1886 – 1891	Umar Salum	
1891 – 1903	Ould Sidi Ahmad Salum	
1903 – 1917	Sheikh Sa'd Bu	Also known as Sidi Ould Deid.
1917 – 1932	Sheikh al-Khalifa	Also known as Sidi Buya.

== See also ==
- History of Mauritania
- Trarza Region
- Franco-Trarzan War of 1825
- Ma al-'Aynayn: (b. c:a 1830–31, d. 1910) religious and political leader who fought French and Spanish colonization

== Bibliography ==
- M. Th. Houtsma, E. van Donzel. E. J. (1993 ed.) Brill's First Encyclopaedia of Islam, 1913-1936, BRILL: New York City. ISBN 90-04-08265-4.
- Boubacar B. 1998) Senegambia and the Atlantic Slave Trade, Cambridge University Press: Cambridge. ISBN 0-521-59760-9.
- Ruler list at worldstatesmen.org.
- (in French) Muhammed Al Muhtar W. As-sa'd, « Émirats et espace émiral maure : le cas du Trârza aux XVIIIe-XIXe siècles », Mauritanie, entre arabité et africanité, Revue des mondes musulmans et de la Méditerranée, n° 54, juillet 1990, p. 53-82)
