= Oulad Tidrarin =

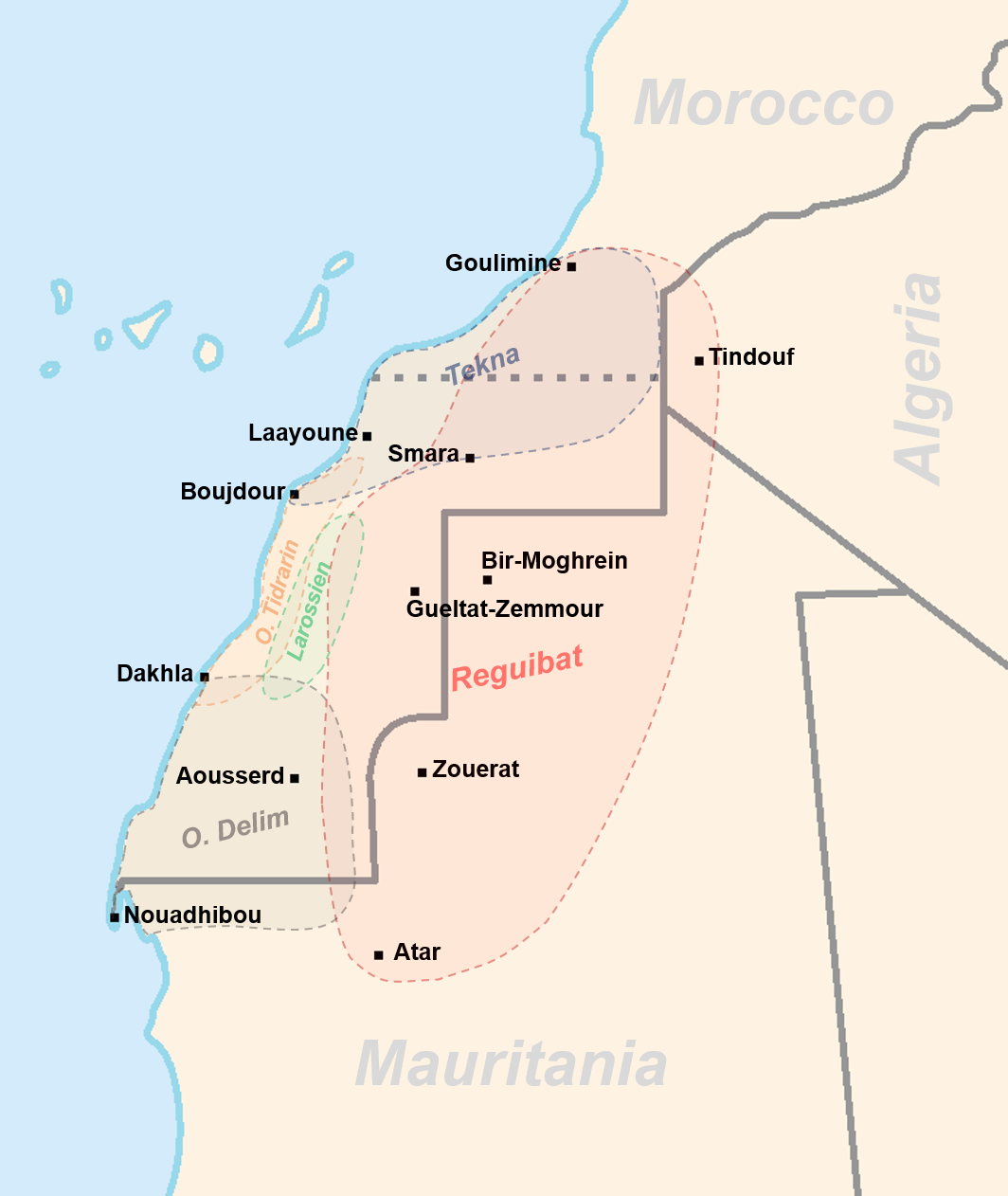
Map of the tribes of Western Sahara

The Oulad Tidrarin (Arabic: أولاد تيدرارين, romanized: Awlād Tīdrārīn) is a Sahrawi tribe of Arab origin. They speak Hassaniya Arabic. They are Muslims, belonging to the Maliki school of Sunni Islam. They live mainly in Western Sahara but also in Morocco and Mauritania.

The Oulad Tidrarin settled the Saguia el-Hamra and Río de Oro areas of Northwest Africa, their original home. Many live in the Cape Bojador and the coastline of the south of Morocco, some on the coast of Saguia el-Hamra and some branches live in the south and east of Mauritania. There are some members of the Uladsliman and Lidadsa in subgroups in Mali.

== Etymology ==
The name Tidrarin is Berber and means 'mountain dweller'. It is the diminutive form of idrarin ("mountains").

== History ==
The Oulad Tidrarin are said to be founded by Hannin whose alias was Tidrarin (the mountain dweller). Hannin may have lived in the 15th century and was originally from the Adrar in Mauritania but was taken to what is today Western Sahara after being captured by a ghazi. Ali, the great-great grandson of Hannin, is said to be the ancestor of most of the fractions of the tribes. Furthermore, seven of the Oulad Tidrarin's fractions descend from Sidi Ahmed Bou Ghambor who was an important and powerful chief at the end of the 17th century and beginning of the 18th during the Oulad Tidrarin's zenith.

The tribe entered a period of decline in the 18th century and eventually they were forced to pay the horma to the Oulad Delim becoming their tributaries. Only the Ahel Taleb Ali avoided this. They were reduced from a zawaya tribe to the status of a znaga tribe and were not allowed to bear arms.

In 1888, they rebelled against the Oulad Delim and in retaliation the Oulad Delim killed 22 Tidrarinis at Tah. This caused many Tidrarinis to seek refuge and migrate to Morocco. Eventually, other tribes like the Reguibat who sided the Oulad Tidrarin and the Ait Lahcen of the Tekna who joined the Oulad Delim joined the war. However, the Reguibat made peace with the Oulad Delim which led to more of the Oulad Tidrarin migrating to Morocco and the ones who remained being forced to pay tribute to the Oulad Delim.

Because of the imposed Spanish peace, the Oulad Tidrarin were freed from the horma and prospered comparatively to the Oulad Delim. In 1950, they owned more camels than the Oulad Delim and by the 1970s, they were mainly sedentary like other Sahrawi tribes. According to the 1974 Spanish census, they mainly lived in Laayoune, Dakhla and Boujdour.

== Subdivisions ==
The Oulad Tidrarin are made up of 10 fractions:

- Ahel Taleb Ali
- Oulad Moussa - They were one of the fractions that descended from Sidi Bou Ghambor and when the Oulad Tidrarin were forced to pay the horma to the Oulad Delim, they paid the horma to the Loudeikat fraction of the Oulad Delim.
- Oulad Ali
- Laboubat
- El-Faaris
- Lahseinat/El-Haseinat
- Oulad Souleiman
- Ahel Esteila
- Ahel Hadj
- Lidadsa

The Lidadsa and the El-Haseinat were adopted into the tribe so they do not descend from Ali, the great-great-grandson of Hannin (Tidrarin).

== Religious activism ==
The tribe has established centres for the spread of Islamic culture, particularly along the Atlantic coast region.

== See also ==
- Beni Hassan
- Banu Hilal
- Oulad Delim
- Reguibat
