= Sahrawis =

Ethnic group native to the western part of the Sahara desert

صحراويون (Arabic) Saharauis (Spanish)
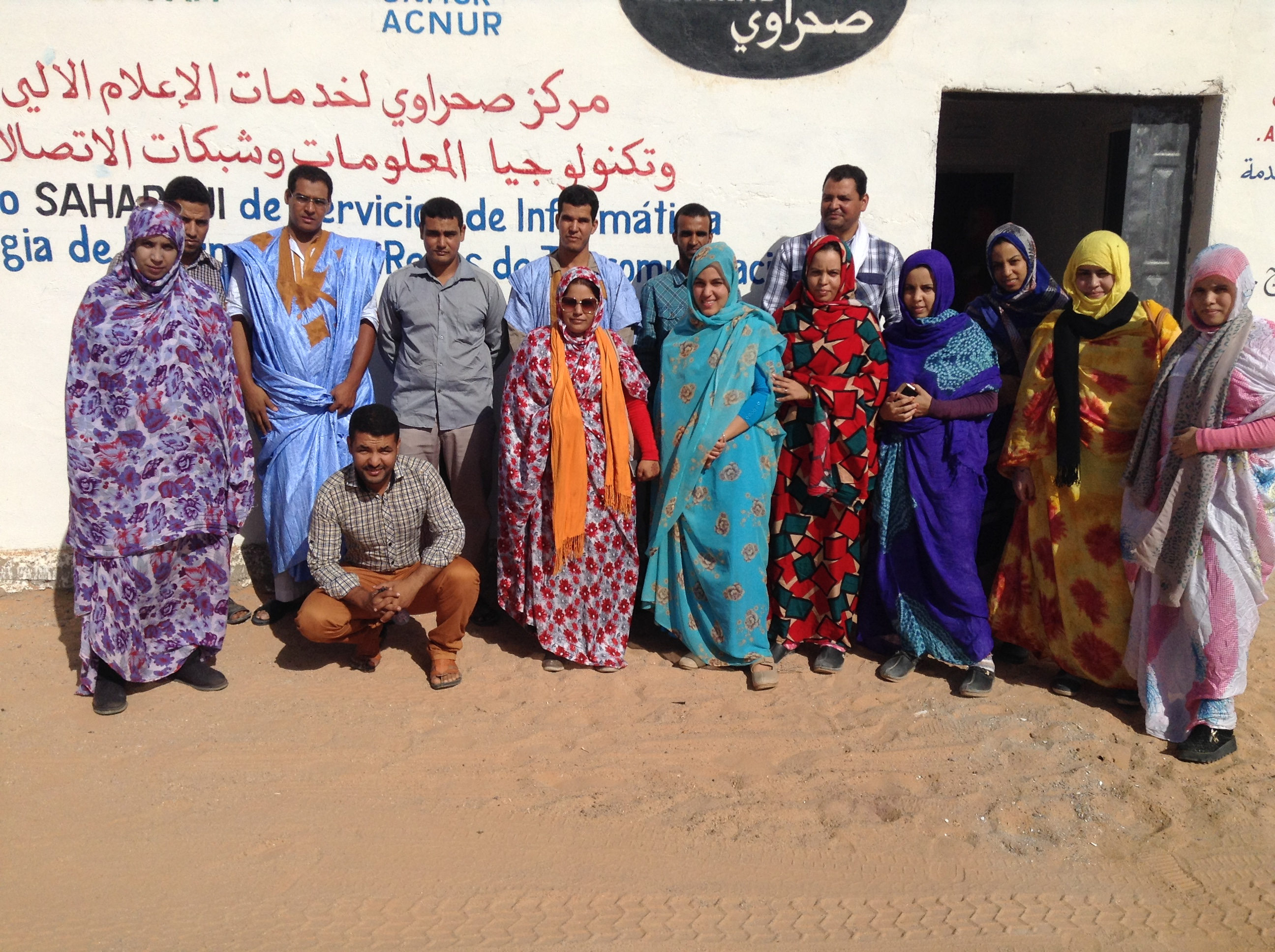
- Sahrawi refugees in Tindouf refugee camp, Algeria

Total population
- 652,271 (2020 est.)

Regions with significant populations
- Western Sahara: ~160,000 mostly in the Moroccan-occupied zone where they make up about 30% of the population
- Algeria: 174,000 refugees living in the Sahrawi refugee camps at Tindouf
- Morocco: 90,000
- Mauritania: 26,000 (refugees)
- Spain: 3,000–12,000

Languages
- Hassaniya Arabic (native), Berber languages (native), Modern Standard Arabic (written only), Spanish (lingua franca), French (lingua franca)

Religion
- Sunni Islam

Related ethnic groups
- Beidane, Moroccans, other Maghrebi Arabs, other Arab-Berbers and Arabized Berbers, other Arab and Berber peoples, Haratin, Gnawa, Wolof, Soninke, Afro-Arabs, Tuaregs, other Maghrebis

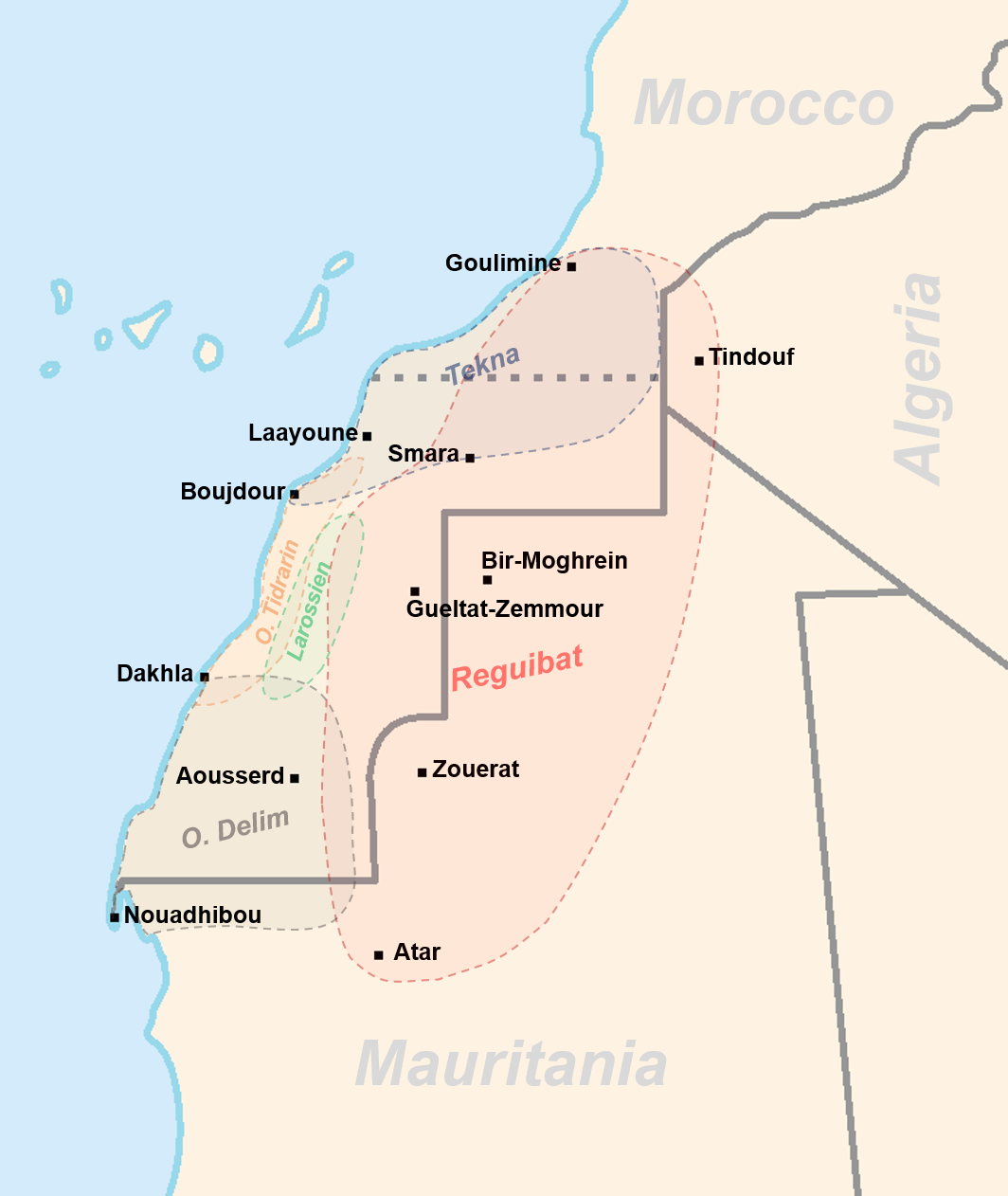
Map of the tribes of Western Sahara

The Sahrawis, or Sahrawi people (Arabic: صحراويون, romanized: Ṣaḥrāwīyūn; Spanish: saharauis), are an ethnic group native to the western part of the Sahara desert, which includes the Western Sahara, southern Morocco, much of Mauritania, and along the southwestern border of Algeria. They are of mixed Hassani Arab and Sanhaji Berber descent, as well as West African and other indigenous populations.

As with most peoples living in the Sahara, the Sahrawi culture is a mix of Arab and indigenous African elements. Sahrawis are composed of many tribes and are largely speakers of the Hassaniya dialect of Arabic.

== Etymology ==
Ṣaḥrāwī (صحراوي) is an Arabic word literally meaning "inhabitant of the desert". It is derived from the Arabic word for desert, Ṣaḥrā' (صحراء). A man is called a Sahrawi, and a woman is called a Sahrawiya. Traditionally, it referred to any inhabitant of the desert but came to refer to both the current and former inhabitants of the Western Sahara. Another term used to collectively refer to Sahrawis was Ahel es-Sahel meaning people of the west/coast of the desert.

== History ==
=== Early history ===
Nomadic Berbers, mainly of the Senhaja/Zenaga tribal confederation, inhabited the areas now known as Western Sahara, southern Morocco, Mauritania and southwestern Algeria before Islam arrived in the 8th century CE. It is not known when the camel was introduced to the region (probably in the first or second millennium BCE), but it revolutionized the traditional trade routes of North Africa. Berber caravans transported salt, gold between North and West Africa, and the control of trade routes became a major ingredient in the constant power struggles between various tribes and sedentary peoples. On more than one occasion, the Berber tribes of present-day Mauritania, Morocco and Western Sahara united behind religious leaders to sweep the surrounding governments from power, then founding principalities, dynasties, or even vast empires of their own. This was the case with the Almoravid dynasty of Morocco and Andalusia, and several emirates in Mauritania.

In the 11th century, the Bedouin tribes of the Beni Hilal and Beni Sulaym migrated westwards from Egypt to the Maghreb region. In the early 13th century, the Yemeni Maqil tribes migrated westwards across the entirety of Arabia and northern Africa, finally settling around present-day Morocco. They were badly received by the Zenata Berber descendants of the Merinid dynasty, and among the tribes pushed out of the territory were the Beni Hassan.

This tribe entered the domains of the Sanhaja, and over the following centuries imposed itself upon them, intermixing with the population in the process. Berber attempts to shake off the rule of Arab warrior tribes occurred sporadically, but assimilation gradually won out, and after the failed Char Bouba uprising (1644–74), the Berber tribes virtually without exception embraced Arab or Muslim culture and even claim Arab heritage. The Arabic dialect of the Beni Ḥassān, Hassaniya, remains the mother tongue of Mauritania and Moroccan-occupied Western Sahara, and is also spoken in southern Morocco and western Algeria, among affiliated tribes. Berber vocabulary and cultural traits remain common, despite the fact that many if not all of the Sahrawi/Moorish tribes today claim Arab ancestry; several are even claiming to be descendants of Muhammad, so-called sharifian tribes.

The modern day Sahrawis are a mixed ethnic group of diverse Berbers, Sahelian, West Africans & Arabs background. The people inhabit the westernmost Sahara desert, in the area of modern Mauritania, Morocco, Western Sahara, and parts of Algeria. (Some tribes would also traditionally migrate into northern Mali and Niger, or even further along the Saharan caravan routes.) As with most Saharan peoples, the tribes reflect a highly mixed heritage, combining Arab, and other influences, including ethnic and cultural characteristics found in many ethnic groups of the Sahel. The latter were primarily acquired through mixing with Wolof, Soninke and other populations of the southern Sahel, and through the acquisition of slaves by wealthier nomad families.

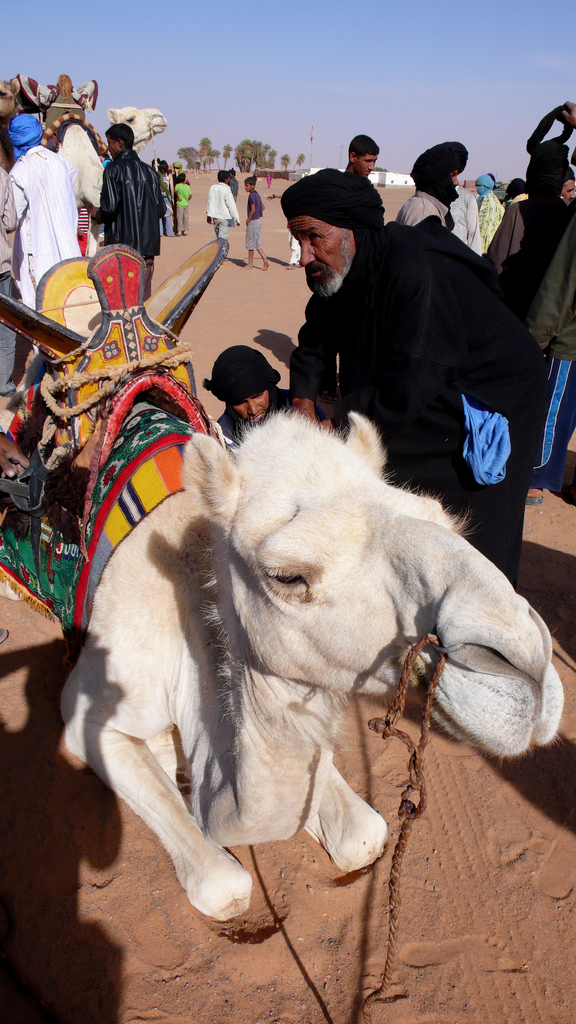
Sahrawi men with a camel

In pre-colonial times, the Sahara was generally considered Blad Essiba or "the land of dissidence" by the Moroccan central government and Sultan of Morocco in Fez, and by the authorities of the Deys of Algiers. The governments of the pre-colonial Sahelian empires of Mali and Songhai appear to have had a similar relationship with the tribal territories, which were at once the home of undisciplined raiding tribes and the main trade route for the Saharan caravan trade. Central governments had little control over the region, although the Hassaniya tribes would occasionally extend "beya" or allegiance to prestigious rulers, to gain their political backing or, in some cases, as a religious ceremony. The Moorish populations of what is today northern Mauritania established a number of emirates, claiming the loyalty of several different tribes and through them exercising semi-sovereignty over traditional grazing lands. This could be considered the closest thing to centralized government that was ever achieved by the Hassaniya tribes, but even these emirates were weak, conflict-ridden and rested more on the willing consent of the subject tribes than on any capacity to enforce loyalty.

=== European colonialism ===
Modern distinctions drawn between the various Hassaniya-speaking Sahrawi-Moorish groups are primarily political, but cultural differences dating from different colonial and post-colonial histories are also apparent. An important divider is whether the tribal confederations fell under French or Spanish colonial rule. France conquered most of North and West Africa largely during the late 19th century. This included Algeria and Mauritania, and, from 1912, Morocco. But Western Sahara and scattered minor parts of Morocco fell to Spain, and were named Spanish Sahara (subdivided into Río de Oro and Saguia el-Hamra) and Spanish Morocco respectively. These colonial intrusions brought the Muslim Saharan peoples under Christian European rule for the first time, and created lasting cultural and political divides between and within existing populations, as well as upsetting traditional balances of power in differing ways.

The Sahrawi-Moorish areas, then still undefined as to exact territorial boundaries, proved troublesome for the colonizers, just as they had for neighbouring dynasties in previous centuries. The political loyalty of these populations were first and foremost to their respective tribes, and supertribal allegiances and alliances would shift rapidly and unexpectedly. Their nomadic lifestyle made direct control over the territories hard to achieve, as did general lawlessness, an absence of prior central authority, and a widely held contempt for the kind of settled life that the colonizers sought to bring about. Centuries of intertribal warfare and raids for loot (ghazzu) guaranteed that the populations were well armed and versed in guerilla-style warfare. Tribes allied to hostile European powers would now also be considered fair game for cattle raids on those grounds, which tied the struggle against France and Spain into the traditional power play of the nomads, aggravating the internal struggles.

Uprisings and violent tribal clashes therefore took place with increasing frequency as European encroachment increased, and on occasion took the form of anti-colonial holy war, or Jihad, as in the case of the Ma al-'Aynayn uprising in the first years of the 20th century. It was not until the 1930s that Spain was able to finally subdue the interior of present-day Western Sahara, and then only with strong French military assistance. Mauritania's raiding Moors had been brought under control in the previous decades, partly through skilful exploitation by the French of traditional rivalries and social divisions between the tribes. In these encounters, the large Reguibat tribe proved especially resistant to the new rulers, and its fighters would regularly slip in and out of French and Spanish territory, similarly exploiting the rivalries between European powers. The last major Reguibat raid took place in 1934, after which the Spanish authorities occupied Smara, finally gaining control over the last unpatrolled border territories.

The Sahrawi-Moorish tribes remained largely nomadic until the early to mid-20th century, when Franco–Spanish rivalries (as well as disagreements between different wings of the French colonial regime) managed to impose rigid, if arbitrary, borders on the previously fluid Sahara. The wide-ranging grazing lands of the nomads were split apart, and their traditional economies, based on trans-Saharan caravan trade and raiding of each other and the northern and southern Sahel neighbors, were broken. Little attention was paid to existing tribal confederations and zones of influence when dividing up the Saharan interior.

==== Different colonial practices ====
French and Spanish colonial governments would gradually, and with varying force, impose their own systems of government and education over these territories, exposing the native populations to differing colonial experiences. The populations in Algeria were subjected to direct French rule, which was organized to enable the massive settlement of French and European immigrants. In Mauritania, they experienced a French non-settler colonial administration which, if light in its demands on the nomads, also deliberately overturned the existing social order, allying itself with lower-ranking marabout and zenaga tribes against the powerful warrior clans of the Hassane Arabs. In southern Morocco, France upheld indirect rule through the sultanate in some areas, while Spain exercised direct administration in others. Spanish Sahara was treated first as a colony, and later as an overseas province, with gradually tightening political conditions, and, in later years, a rapid influx of Spanish settlers (making Spaniards about 20% of the population in 1975). By the time of decolonization in 1950s–1970s, Sahrawi tribes in all these different territories had experienced roughly a generation or more of distinct experiences; often, however, their nomadic lifestyle had guaranteed that they were subjected to less interference than what sedentary populations experienced in the same areas.

==== Debate on pre-colonial allegiances ====
The period of colonization radically changed existing power structures, leaving a confused legacy of contradictory political affiliations, European-drawn borders with little resemblance to ethnic and tribal realities, and the foundations of modern political conflict.

For example, both sides in the Western Sahara conflict (Morocco vs. the Polisario Front) draw heavily on colonial history to prove their version of reality. Proponents of the Greater Morocco ideology point to some Sahrawi tribes calling upon the Moroccan sultan, who until 1912 remained the last independent Islamic ruler of the area, for assistance against the Europeans (see Ma al-'Aynayn). Pro-independence Sahrawis, on the other hand, point out that such statements of allegiance were almost routinely given by various tribal leaders to create short-term alliances, and that other heads of tribes indeed similarly proclaimed allegiance to Spain, to France, to Mauritanian emirates, and indeed to each other; they argue that such arrangements always proved temporary, and that the tribal confederations always maintained de facto independence of central authority, and would even fight to maintain this independence.

The International Court of Justice issued a ruling on the matter in 1975, stating that there had existed ties between the Moroccan sultan and some (mainly northerly Tekna) tribes in then-Spanish Sahara, but that these ties were not sufficient to abrogate Western Sahara's right to self-determination. The same kind of ruling was issued with regard to Mauritania, where the court found that there were indeed strong tribal and cultural links between the Sahrawis and Mauritanian populations, including historical allegiance to some Moorish emirates, but that these were not ties of a state or government character, and did not constitute formal bonds of sovereignty. Thus, the court recommended the United Nations to continue to pursue self-determination for the Sahrawis, enabling them to choose for themselves whether they wanted Spanish Sahara to turn into an independent state, or to be annexed to Morocco or Mauritania.

=== Decolonisation attempts ===
==== Western Sahara conflict ====
The area today referred to as Western Sahara remains, according to the United Nations, one of the world's last remaining major non-self-governing territories. Morocco occupies most of the territory as its Southern Provinces, and while recognized by the United States, the legality is disputed militarily by the Polisario Front, an Algerian-backed movement claiming independence for the territory as the Sahrawi Arab Democratic Republic (SADR). Since 1991, there has been a cease-fire between Morocco and Polisario, but disturbances in Moroccan-occupied territories as well as the ongoing dispute over the legal status of the territory guarantees continued United Nations involvement and occasional international attention to the issue.

==== Polisario Front ====
Flag of the Sahrawi Arab Democratic Republic, a partially-recognized Sahrawi state, used by the Polisario Front

The Polisario Front is the Western Sahara's national liberation movement, fighting for the independence of the Western Sahara since 1973—originally against Spanish rule; after 1975, against Mauritania and Morocco; since 1979, against Morocco only. The organization is based in Algeria, where it is responsible for the Tindouf refugee camps. The organization has maintained a cease-fire with Morocco since 1991 (see Settlement Plan), but continues to strive for the territory's independence as the Sahrawi Arab Democratic Republic (SADR) through peaceful negotiations. The Polisario Front restricts its claims to the colonially defined Western Sahara, holding no claim to, for example, the Sahrawi-populated Tarfaya Strip in Morocco, or any part of Mauritania. Since 1979, the Polisario Front has been recognized by the United Nations as the representative of the people of Western Sahara.

== Demographics ==
=== Ethnic background: Berbers, Sahelians and Arabs ===
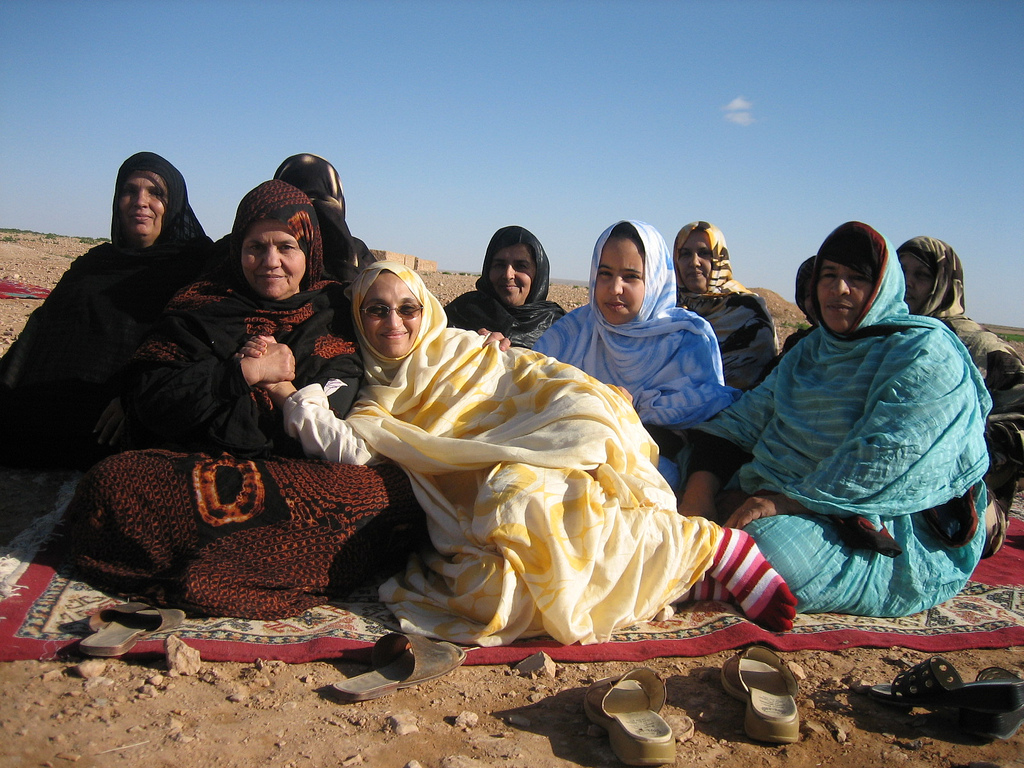
Group of Sahrawi women, including Aminatou Haidar.

As described above, the Hassaniya speaking tribes are of Arab Beni Hassan descent, who fused with the dominant Sanhaja Berber tribes, as well as Sahelian African and other indigenous populations (e.g. indigenous Soninke, Wolof speaking groups). Even though cultural Arabization of the Berber people was thorough, some elements of Berber identity remain.

Some tribes, such as the large Reguibat, have a Berber background but have since been thoroughly arabized; others, such as the Oulad Delim, are considered descendants of the Beni Hassan, even though intermarriage with other tribes and former slaves have occurred; a few, such as the Tekna tribal confederation, have retained some Berber dialect of the area. Often, though not in the case of the Tekna, the Berber-Arab elements of a tribe's cultural heritage reflects social stratification. In traditional Moorish-Sahrawi society, Arab tribes of the Tekna confederation claimed a role as rulers and protectors of the disarmed weaker Berber tribes of the Takna confederation. Thus, the warrior tribes and nobility would be Arab.

However, most tribes, regardless of their mixed heritage, tend to claim some form of Arab ancestry, as this has been key to achieving social status. Many (the so-called chorfa tribes) will also claim descendancy from the Islamic prophet Muhammad. In any case, no tribal identity is cut in stone, and over the centuries a great deal of intermarriage and tribal re-affiliation has occurred to blur former ethnic/cultural lines; groups have often seamlessly re-identified to higher status identities, after achieving the military or economic strength to defeat former rulers. This was, for example, the case of the largest of the Sahrawi tribes, the Reguibat. A Berber-descended zawiya (scholarly) tribe who in the 18th century took up camel nomadism and warrior traditions, they simultaneously took on more and more of an Arab identity, reflecting their new position alongside the traditional warrior castes of Arab Hassane origin, such as the Oulad Delim and the Arabic-speaking tribes of the Tekna confederation.

=== Social and ethnic hierarchy ===
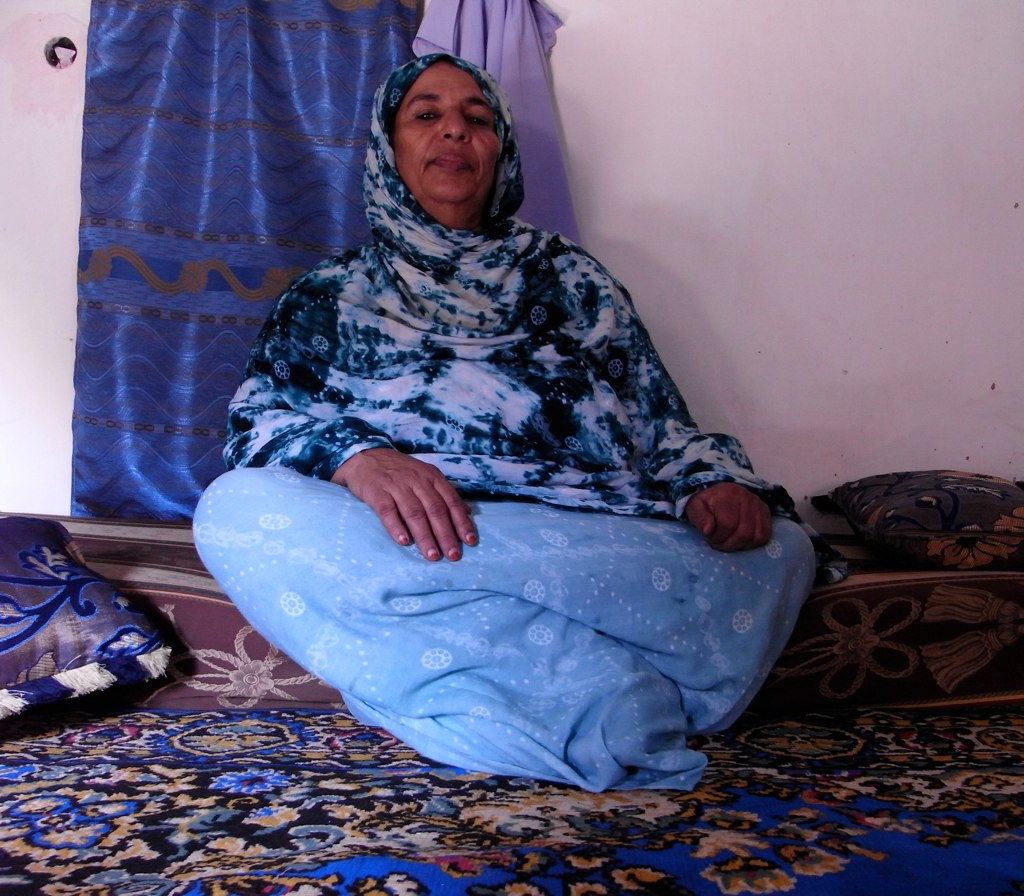
Sahrawi woman.

Generally speaking, the Hassaniya populations were (or are) divided into several groups, of different social status.

At the peak of society were the aristocratic "warrior" lineages or clans, the Hassane, supposed descendants of the Beni Hassan Arab tribe (cf. Oulad Delim). Below them stood the "scholarly" or "clerical" lineages. These were called marabout or zawiya tribes (cf. Oulad Tidrarine). The latter designation the preferred one in among the Western Sahara-centered tribes, who would also almost invariably claim chorfa status to enhance their religious credibility. The zawiya tribes were protected by Hassan overlords in exchange for their religious services and payment of the horma, a tributary tax in cattle or goods; while they were in a sense exploited, the relationship was often more or less symbiotic. Under both these groups, but still part of the Western Sahara society, stood the znaga tribes—tribal groups labouring in demeaning occupations, such as fishermen (cf. Imraguen), as well as peripheral semi-tribal groups working in the same fields (among them the "professional" castes, mallemin and igawen). All these groups were considered to be among the bidan grouping.

Below them ranked servile groups known as Haratin, according to some sources descendants of the earlier pre-Arab populations. (Note that "Haratin", a term of obscure origin, has a different meaning in the Berber regions of Morocco.) They often lived serving affiliated bidan families, and as such formed part of the tribe, not tribes of their own. Below them came the slaves themselves, who were owned individually or in family groups, and could hope at best to be freed and rise to the status of Haratin. Rich bidan families would normally own a few slaves at the most, as nomadic societies have less use of slave labour than sedentary societies; however, in some cases, slaves were used to work oasis plantations, farming dates, digging wells etc.

An important reference on Sahrawi population ethnography is the work of Spanish anthropologist Julio Caro Baroja, who in 1952–53 spent several months among native tribes of the Spanish Sahara. He published a 1955 book on the subject.

=== Population ===
According to the Ethnologue database, there were more than three million Hassaniya speakers in 2006, of whom 2.7 million resided in Mauritania. The number of Hassaniya speakers identifying as Sahrawi in the modern political sense is unknown, and estimates are hotly contested by partisans in the Western Sahara conflict. Most estimates however center around 200,000 to 400,000. These populations are centered in southern Morocco, Western Sahara, and in the Tindouf Province of Algeria, where large number of refugees from Western Sahara are located.

=== Languages ===
Sahrawis' native language is the Hassānīya, a variety of Arabic originally spoken by the Beni Hassan Arabian tribes of the Western Sahara. It has almost completely replaced the Berber languages originally spoken in this region. Though clearly a western dialect, Hassānīya is relatively distant from other North African variants of Arabic. Its geographical location exposed it to influence from Zenaga and Wolof. There are several dialects of Hassaniya; the primary differences among them are phonetics. Today Hassaniya is spoken in south-western Algeria, northern Mali, Mauritania, southern-Morocco and Western Sahara. (Mauritania has the biggest concentration of speakers) Some Sahrawis speak Tashelhit and/or Moroccan Arabic as a second language due to interaction with neighboring populations.

Modern Standard Arabic and Amazigh are the official languages of the Moroccan-occupied part of Western Sahara and Algeria. Mauritania has Modern Standard Arabic as its sole official language, while the Sahrawi Arab Democratic Republic recognizes both Arabic and Spanish as official languages.

The current Moroccan constitution (adopted in July 2011) mentions, in its 5th article, the Hassaniya language and recommends its preservation as a cultural heritage of Morocco.

Due to the past colonization of Western Sahara and Cape Juby by Spain, Spanish is spoken as a lingua franca by most of the Sahrawis, especially among the Sahrawi diaspora, with the Sahrawi Press Service, official news service of the Sahrawi Arab Democratic Republic, being available in Spanish since 2001 and the Sahara Film Festival, Western Sahara's only film festival, showing mainly Spanish-language films.

=== Refugees ===
After the Madrid Accords which transferred administration of the Spanish Sahara to Mauritania and Morocco, and Morocco claimed sovereignty over the territories, dismissing a judgement of the International Court of Justice reaffirming the right of the Sahrawi people to self-determination, from late 1975 an exodus of refugees fled the violence that ensued. Substantial numbers ended up in the Polisario Front movement's base areas in the Algerian Sahara, where refugee camps were set up in the Tindouf Province, and a smaller number in camps in Mauritania. The camps in Tindouf were named after towns in the Western Sahara (Awserd, Laayoune, Smara and Dakhla).

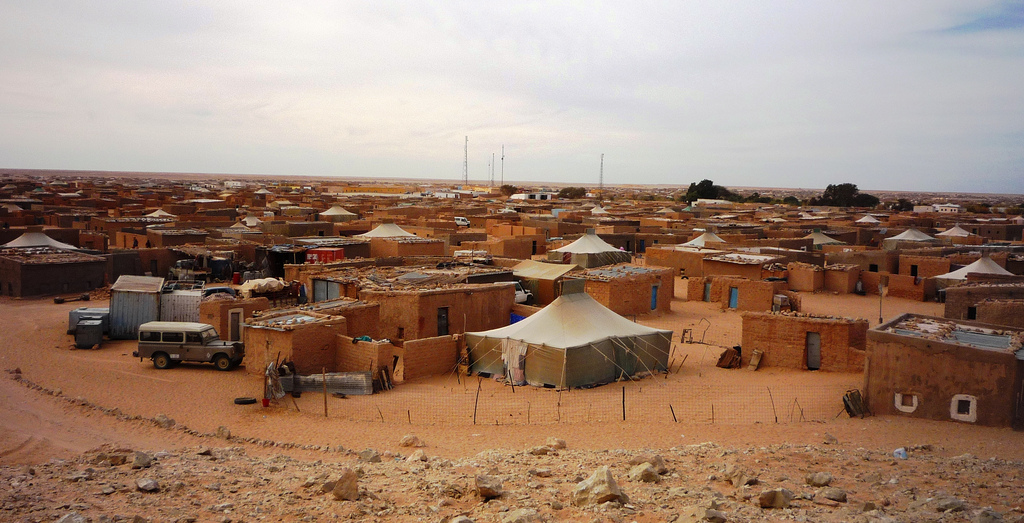
Sahrawi refugee camp in Tindouf Province, Algeria

As of January 2018, the number of Sahrawi refugees living in the five camps in Tindouf is estimated about 174,000, of whom 125,000 were entitled to food and nutrition assistance by UNHCR and 90,000 individuals regarded "most vulnerable refugees". The Moroccan government has contended that the figure is much lower, around 45,000 to 50,000, and that these people are kept in the refugee camps against their will by Polisario.

Mauritania housed as of 2009 about 26,000 Sahrawi refugees, classified by UNHCR as "people in a refugee-like situation". Many of them moved back and forth from the camps in Tindouf, Algeria.

Additionally, between 3,000 and 12,000 Sahrawis live in Spain, their former colonizer.

In 2018, thirty Sahrawi refugees died in an air crash of Algerian Air Force Il-76. They had been visiting Algiers for various medical and bureaucratic reasons. Sahrawis from the refugee camps are regularly provided with free flights in Algerian military transport aircraft.

== Culture ==
=== Religion ===
Religiously, the Sahrawis are Sunni Muslims of the Maliki rite or school. Historically, religious practice has been pragmatically adapted to nomad life and local tradition. Also, since the late medieval period, various Sufi Turuq (brotherhoods or orders), have played an important role in popular religious practice; the most important among these are the Qadiriyya and Tijaniyya. Further, among the Hassaniya tribes, certain lineages reputed to be descended from Muhammad, the chorfa, have played an important role in intertribal religious society.

=== Tribalism ===
See article on tribalism and the list of Sahrawi tribes.

The tribe was the historical basis of social and political organisation among the Hassaniya-speaking tribes of the Sahara, well into the colonial and arguably post-colonial period. Traditionally, Hassaniya Sahrawi society was completely tribal, organized in a complex web of shifting alliances and tribal confederations, with no stable and centralized governing authority.

Lawmaking, conflict resolution and central decision-making within the tribe, was carried out by the Djema'a, (Arabic, gathering) a gathering of elected elders (shaykhs) and religious scholars. Occasionally, larger tribal gatherings could be held in the form of the Ait Arbein (Group of Forty), which would handle supratribal affairs such as common defence of the territory or common diplomacy. During colonial times, Spain attempted to assume some of the legitimacy of these traditional institutions by creating its own Djema'a, a state-run political association that supported its claims to the territory.

== Notable people ==
- Al Khadra Mabrook
- Hadjatu Aliat Swelm

== See also ==
- Sahrawi refugees
- Bedouin
- Beidane
- Cape Juby
- Green March
- History of Western Sahara
- List of Spanish colonial wars in Morocco
- James Riley (captain)

== Sources ==
- Hodges, Tony (1983), Western Sahara: The Roots of a Desert War, Lawrence Hill Books (ISBN 0-88208-152-7)
- Jensen, Erik (2005), Western Sahara: Anatomy of a Stalemate, International Peace Studies (ISBN 1-58826-305-3)
- Mercer, John (1976), Spanish Sahara, George Allen & Unwid Ltd (ISBN 0-04-966013-6)
- Norris, H.T. (1986), The Arab Conquest of the Western Sahara, Longman Publishing Group (ISBN 0-582-75643-X)
- Pazzanita, Anthony G. and Hodges, Tony (1994), Historical Dictionary of Western Sahara, Scarecrow Press (ISBN 0-8108-2661-5)
- Shelley, Toby (2004), Endgame in the Western Sahara: What Future for Africa's Last Colony?, Zed Books (ISBN 1-84277-341-0)
- Thobhani, Akbarali (2002), Western Sahara Since 1975 Under Moroccan Administration: Social, Economic, and Political Transformation, Edwin Mellen Press (ISBN 0-7734-7173-1)
- Thompson, Virginia and Adloff, Richard (1980), The Western Saharans. Background to Conflict, Barnes & Noble Books (ISBN 0-389-20148-0)
