= Mallemin =

Blacksmith caste in Hassaniya Arab Society

The mallemin (also maalemine, muallemin etc.; derived from a plural of the Arabic word mu`allim, meaning approximately "sir" or "teacher") were a professional caste of blacksmiths and metalworkers within Hassaniya Arab society, Mauritania, southern Morocco and Western Sahara. They held a low place on the social ladder, but their services were used by all tribes.

== See also ==
Tribal castes and terms:

- Hassane (warrior tribes)
- Zaouiya (religious tribes)
- Znaga (subservient tribes)
- Haratine (former slaves, freedmen)
- 'Abid (slaves)
- Igaouen (griot bards)

Other:

- Mauritania
- Western Sahara
- Hassaniya Arabic
- Arab
- Berber people
