= Oulad Delim =

Bedouin Sahrawi tribe

Oulad Delim أولاد دليم
- Hassani Arab tribe
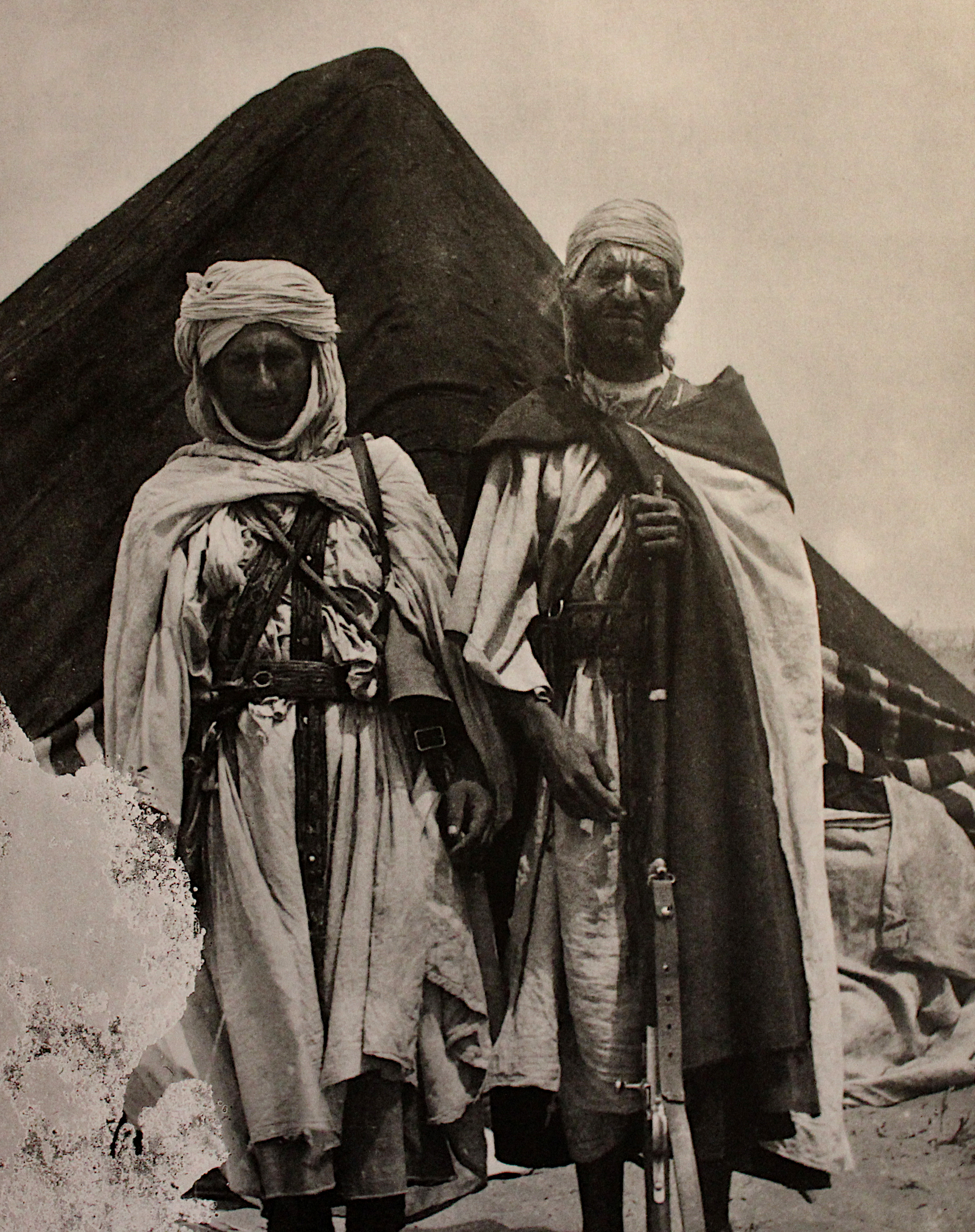
- Leaders of the Oulad Delim Sahrawi tribe at Río de Oro, February 1941. Photograph taken by Tomás Ázcarate Ristori.
- Ethnicity: Arab
- Nisba: Delimi
- Location: Río de Oro
- Descended from: Delim bin Hassan/Delim bin Oudei
- Parent tribe: Beni Ḥassān
- Language: Arabic (Hassaniya Arabic)
- Religion: Sunni Islam

The Oulad Delim (Arabic: أولاد دليم, romanized: Awlād Dlīm) also sometimes written as Oulad Dlim or Oulad Dalim are a Bedouin Sahrawi tribe of Arab descent. They come from the Banu Hassan tribe which is part of the larger Maqil. They were formerly considered of Hassane status i.e. part of the ruling warrior stratum. The Oulad Delim speak Hassaniya Arabic, a Bedouin dialect which is very close to pure classical Arabic. They traditionally live in the southern regions of Western Sahara, especially around the city of Dakhla. They are also found in Morocco in the region of Rabat, Marrakech, Sidi Kacem and El Jadida, where their ancestors received lands from the Moroccan sultans for their participation in warfare, as a Guich tribe, as well as in Mauritania in the region between Nouadhibou and Idjil.

The Oulad Delim have extensive tribal connections with northern Mauritanian tribes. They are Muslims, adhering to the Maliki school of Sunni Islam. Their traditional lifestyle was nomadic, based on camel herding.

== History ==
=== Origins ===
Their eponymous ancestor is Delim. One tradition says that Delim is the son of Oudei bin Hassan. According to this legend, Oudei had a servant whose small size caused her to be called Delima (meaning little animal skin). She had a son through him called Delim who was also of small size. Originally, he was disowned by his father fearing the jealousy of his Hilalian wife but he proved himself when a group tried to attack his father's wife while her own sons fled. This legend is taken from the Arabic novel Antar. Another tradition states that Delim was the son of Hassan himself. According to Paul Marty, the Oulad Delim are divided into the Remeithia, descendants of Remaith and the Oulad Chouikh descendants of Chouikh. Both groups numbered approximately six hundred tents each at the time of 1913.

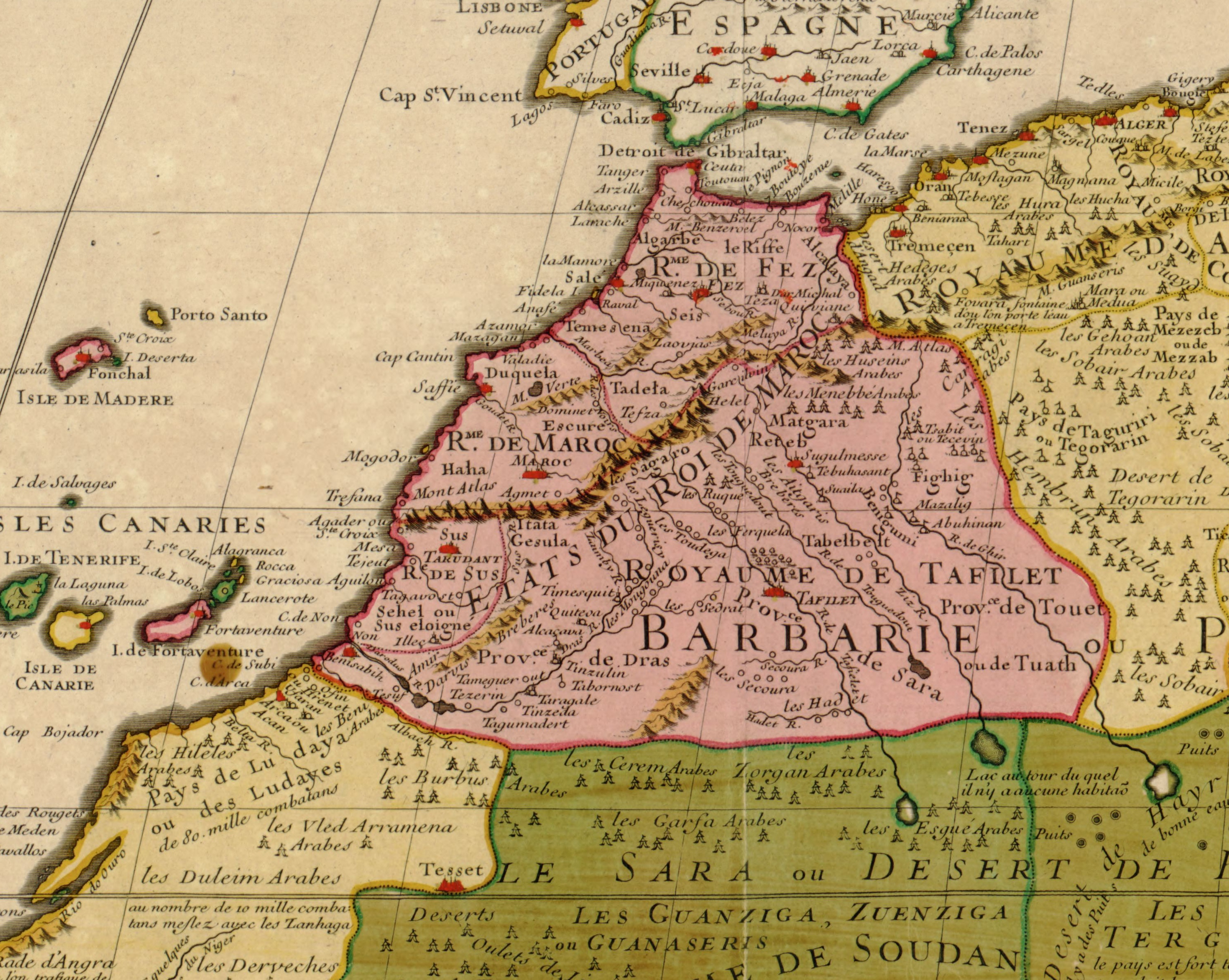
1707 Map of Morocco by Guillaume Delisle showing the historical position of the Oulad Delim (les Duleim Arabes) in the Sahara

Historical author and diplomat Leo Africanus wrote about the Oulad Delim in the 16th century:

The Oulad Dalim live in the Libyan desert together with the Zenaga, an African people; they neither have territory nor any provision, but are poor thieves who often travel to the province of Draa to barter animals for dates. They are poorly equipped, numbering 10,000, with 400 on horseback and the rest on foot.

=== Conflict with other Sahrawi Tribes ===
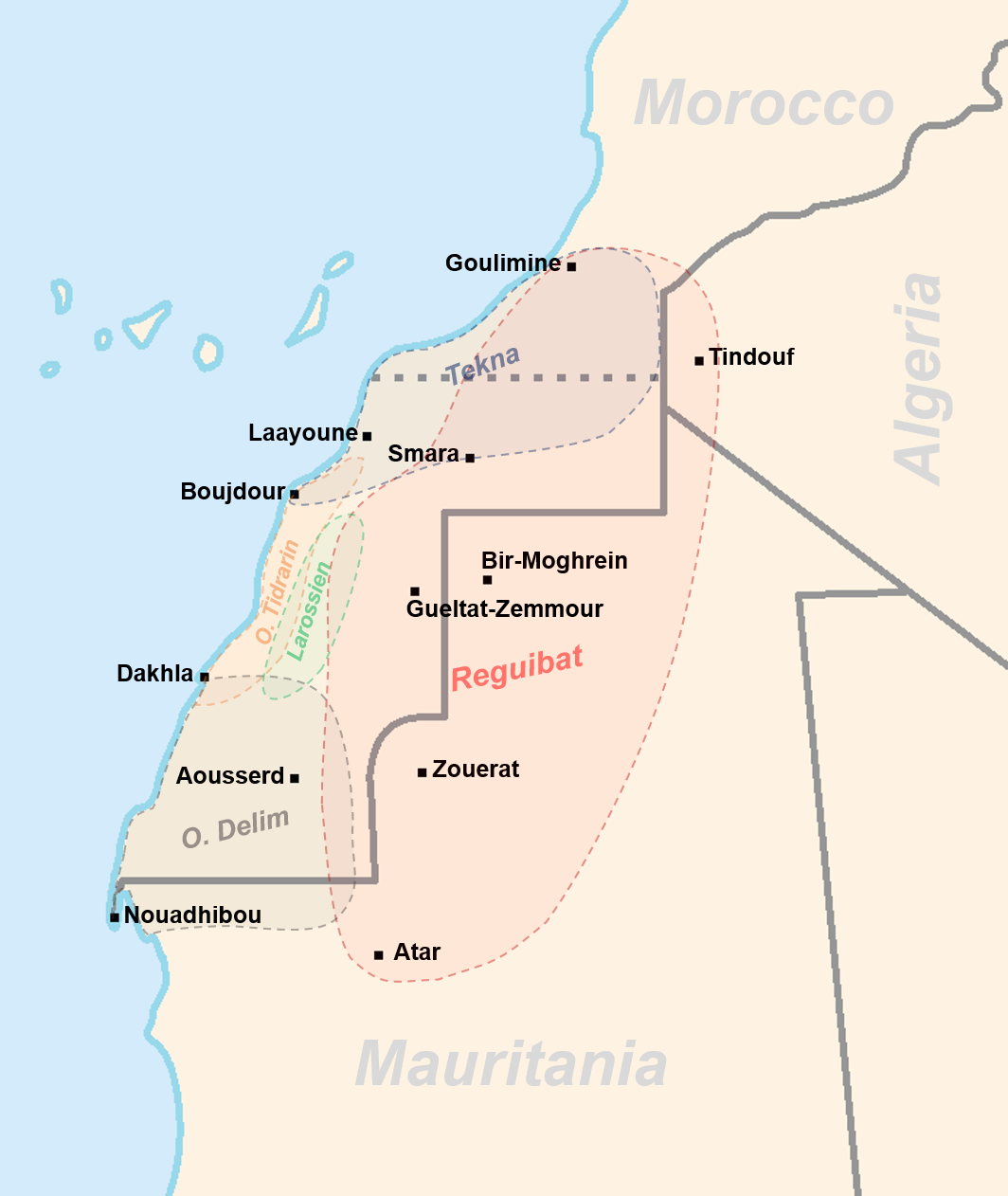
Map of the tribes of Western Sahara

In the second half of the 18th century, they forced the zawiya tribe Oulad Tidrarin to submit to their authority and pay the horma in exchange for protection. The fraction of the Oulad Tidrarin, the Ahel Taleb Ali managed to escape this treatment. The 19th century saw the rise of another Sahrawi tribe, the Reguibat who undermined the authority of the Oulad Delim. In 1888, war broke out between the Oulad Tidrarin and Oulad Delim along with other tribes when the Oulad Tidrarin refused to pay the horma. In the first battle, 22 Oulad Tidrarin were killed. 5 Delimis were killed later that year. Some Oulad Tidrarin migrated to Morocco to escape the Oulad Delim but some forged an alliance with the Reguibat who were angered by the murder of a Reguibi by a Delimi. The Oulad Delim also sought alliances with neighbouring tribes from the Tekna confederation. Initially, they were rejected by the Izarguien who did not wish to upset the Reguibat but they made a pact with the Ait Lahcen in Tan-Tan. Battles continued until 6 months later, the Oulad Delim managed to convince the Reguibat to abandon the Oulad Tidrarin in 1892 causing some of them to migrate to Morocco and others agreeing to submit to the horma again. A now weaker Oulad Delim were only able to extract less tribute than before. There were other conflicts the Oulad Delim were involved in at the end of the 19th century like with the northern Mauritanian Oulad Ghailan in 1899–1900.

=== Encounters with the Spanish ===
They were active in resisting European colonial advances during the 19th century. For example, on March 9, 1885, they attacked the installations of the Companion Comercial Hispanico Africana at Dakhla weeks after it was established. Through this they managed to attain a warlike and powerful reputation. Julio Cervera Baviera came across the Loudeikat fraction of the Oulad Delim describing them as "dedicating to marauding and theft, famous for their villainy and bloodthirsty instincts". However, they gradually established a modus vivendi with the Spanish settlement in Dakhla with one of their chiefs signing an accord with Spain to collaborate with the traders there. The Oulad Delim like other Sahrawi tribes saw the Spanish who at the time was too weak to expand deeper as less of a threat compared to the more powerful and expansive French colonial empire. Because of the enforced colonial peace, the Oulad Delim could no longer rely on their traditional sources of income like enforcing the horma on their tributaries or carrying out ghazzis. This allowed the Oulad Tidrarin who they previously exploited to become more prosperous. To continue to lead the lifestyle as "men of the gun", many Oulad Delim enrolled in the Tropas Nómadas and other Spanish auxiliary forces giving them a reputation for loyalty to Spain in the last decade of Spanish rule. However, most Oulad Delim including those in the Spanish army and police force supported the Polisario Front when Spain did not give the Sahrawis self-determination like they promised.

== Subdivisions ==
By the end of the 19th century, the Oulad Delim were divided into 5 fractions:

- Oulad Tegueddi
- Loudeikat
- Oulad Khaliga
- Oulad Ba Amar
- Serahenna

== See also ==
- Djema'a
- Sahrawi people
- Maghrebi Arabs
- Reguibat tribe
- Oulad Tidrarin
