= Tekna =

Sahrawi semi-nomadic ethnic group

Tekna تكنة
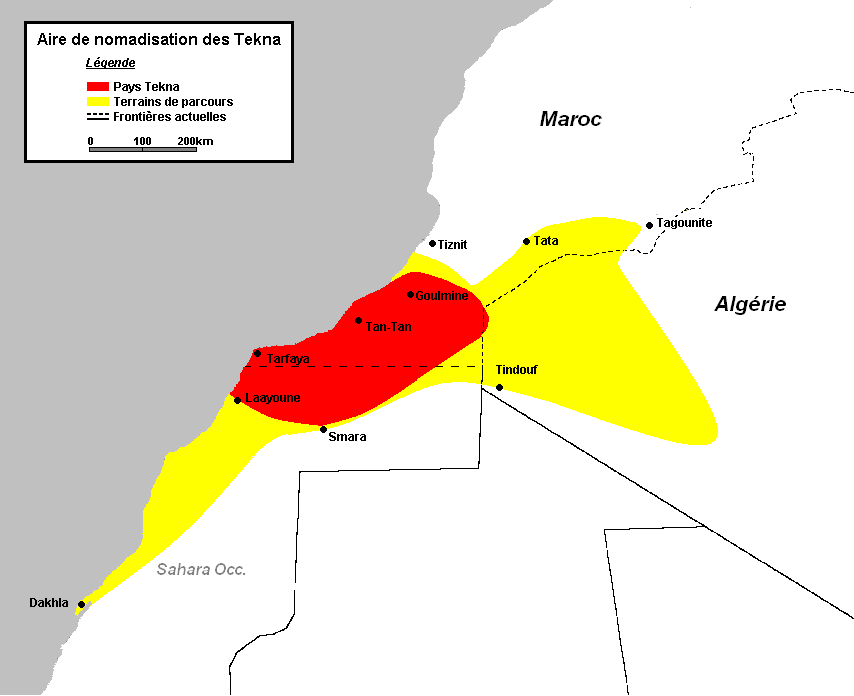
- Ethnicity: Arab-Berber
- Location: Morocco, Western Sahara, Algeria
- Language: Hassaniya Arabic (majority); Tashelhit (minority)
- Religion: Sunni Islam

The Tekna (Arabic: تكنة, romanized: Takna) is a Sahrawi semi-nomadic tribal confederation. It is of mixed Hassani Arab and Sanhaja Berber origins. Its present-day constituents inhabit southern Morocco, northern Western Sahara and western Algeria, though their traditional migration routes extend beyond these areas.

== Demographics ==
The Tekna tribes are predominantly Hassaniya Arabic-speaking, but they also include a minority of Shilha-speaking tribes. Tekna are predominantly Muslims, belonging to the Maliki school of Sunni Islam.

Traditionally, the Tekna lifestyle blended nomadic practices, such as camel and goat herding, with sedentary activities focused on maintaining important caravan trading routes in the Western Sahara.

The Tekna are divided into several Berber- or Arabic-speaking tribes, which are then subdivided into two tribal confederations, or leff:

1. the Aït Djemel confederacy (Western Tekna), consisting of the tribes of Aït Lahcen, Izerguiyen, Yaggout, and Aït Moussa Ou Ali; and
2. the Aït Atman (or Aït Bella) confederacy (Eastern Tekna), consisting of the tribes of Azouafit, Aït Yassine, Aït Oussa, Aït Brahim, and Aït Hmad.

== History ==
Islam began spreading to the Maghreb in the 8th and 9th centuries CE. One of the first historically significant Maghrebi leaders, Yusuf Ibn Tashfin, came to power in the 11th century. Following Ibn Tashfin's promotion to garrison leader by his cousin Abu Bakr Ibn Umar, Ibn Tashfin successfully assembled an army of followers, the Almoravids, who quickly advanced into the Atlas range and conquered northern Morocco by 1059. In 1062, Ibn Tashfin founded Marrakech and, in 1069, captured Fez, completing the Almoravid conquest of Morocco. Ibn Tashfin later expanded his empire to include Muslim Spain, but the rise of Christian Spain and internal tribal conflicts led to its eventual collapse in the following centuries.

In the subsequent years, various dynasties held differing levels of control over regional tribes. The Saadian dynasty, originating in the desert, expelled the Portuguese from present-day Agadir in the mid-16th century, before expanding north and south to Timbuktu under Ahmad el-Mansour. In the 17th century, the first Alawite sultan of Morocco, Al-Rashid Ibn Sharif, seized control over the territory extending from the Tafna River southward to Senegal and Timbuktu. Contingents of Tekna troops were then sent to the Senegal valley on behalf of the Sultan. Ibn Sharif's successor, Moulay Ismail, unified Morocco and led successful desert campaigns to establish nominal sovereignty throughout the region. However, after Moulay Ismail's death in 1727, effective power became intermittent or localized.

After 1765, the Tekna revolted, demanding greater autonomy. On May 30, 1767, Mohammed ben Abdallah, Sultan of Morocco, signed a peace and commerce treaty with King Charles III of Spain, recognizing that Morocco did not control the Tekna tribes.

However, at the time of the Spanish colonization and at the beginning of the 20th century, the Tekna tribes recognized the Sultan of Morocco as their spiritual ruler, but not their political one.

== See also ==
- Banu maaqil
- Sanhaja
- Shilha people
- Beni Ḥassān
- Morocco
- Western Sahara
- Sahrawi
- Reguibat
- Oulad Delim

== Bibliography ==
(in French) Attilo Gaudio, "Les populations du Sahara occidental: histoire, vie et culture", ed. Karthala 1993, (Chap. VIII, pp. 97–116) (ISBN 2-86537-411-4)
