= Hassane =

Traditionally dominant warrior tribes of Mauritania and Western Sahara

The Hassane is a name for the traditionally dominant warrior tribes of the Sahrawi-Moorish areas of present-day Mauritania, southern Morocco and Western Sahara. Although lines were blurred by intermarriage and tribal re-affiliation, the Hassane were considered descendants of the Arab Maqil tribe Beni Hassan (hence the name). They held power over Sanhadja Berber-descended zawiya (religious) and znaga (servant) tribes, extracting from these the horma tax in exchange for armed protection.

Occasionally, such as in the case of the important Reguibat tribe, Zawāyā Berber groups would rise to Hassane status by growing in power and prestige and taking up armed raiding; they would then often Arabize culturally to fit the prevailing image of Hassane tribes as original Arabs.

A good example of a Hassane tribe is the Río de Oro-centered Oulad Delim, which is considered as among the purest descendants of the Beni Hassan.

== See also ==
Tribal castes and terms

- Zawāyā (religious tribes)
- Znaga (subservient tribes)
- Haratine (former slaves, freedmen)
- Abid (slaves)
- Igaouen (griot bards and magicians)

Other

- Mauritania
- Western Sahara
- Hassaniya Arabic
- Arab
- Berber
- Sahrawi
- Moors
