= Haratin =

Ethnic group in Africa

حراطين
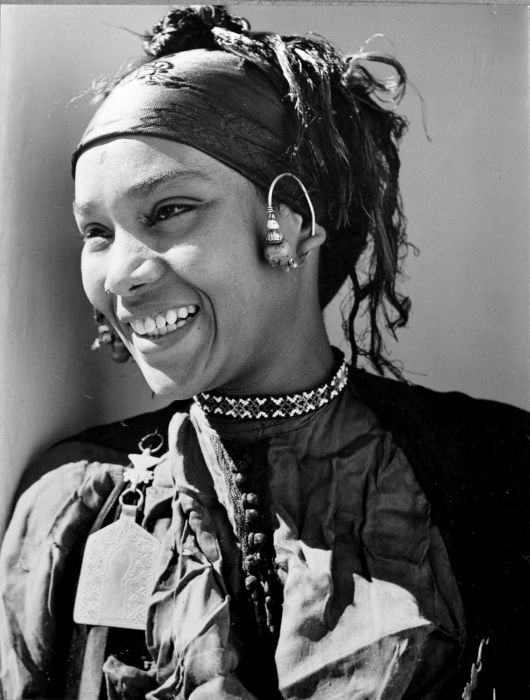
- Haratin woman from Tafilalt, Morocco

Total population
- >1.5 million

Regions with significant populations
- Mauritania (40%); Algeria; Mali; Morocco; Senegal; Tunisia; Western Sahara

Languages
- Maghrebi Arabic; Berber languages

Religion
- Sunni Islam

Related ethnic groups
- Gnawa, Afro-Arabs, Beidane, Sahrawis, Arabized Berbers, Tuareg, other Maghrebis

The Haratin (Arabic: حراطين, romanized: Ḥarāṭīn; /ˈhærətɪn/), (Note: sing. Ḥarṭānī) also spelled Haratine or Harratin, are an ethnic group found in western Sahel and southwestern Maghreb. The Haratin are mostly found in modern Mauritania (where they form a plurality), Morocco, Western Sahara, Senegal, Mali, Tunisia and Algeria.

The Haratin speak Maghrebi Arabic dialects and Berber languages. They are believed to largely descend from native ancient black populations that inhabited the Sahara.

They form the single largest defined ethnolinguistic group in Mauritania where they account for 40% of the population (~1.5 million). In parts of Arab-Berber Maghreb, they are sometimes referred to as a "socially distinct class of workers".

The Haratin have been, and still commonly are socially isolated in some Maghrebi countries, living in segregated, Haratin-only ghettos. They are commonly perceived as an endogamous group of former slaves or descendants of slaves. They converted to Islam under the Arabs and Berbers and were forcibly recruited into the Moroccan army by Ismail Ibn Sharif (Sultan of Morocco from 1672–1727) to consolidate power.

Traditionally, many Haratin have held occupations in agriculture – as serfs, herdsmen, and indentured workers.

== Name and etymology ==
The origin and meaning of the name Haratin (singular Hartani) is controversial. Some claim that it comes from the Berber word ahardan (pl. ihardin) referring to skin color, more specifically "dark color". This word is absent from the Arabic language and has been used by the Sanhaja tribe and Zenata tribe before the arrival of the Beni Ḥassān. Others claim it comes from the Arabic phrase al-Hurr al-Thani literally "the second free man" but having the meaning of "second class free person". Neither of these claims have much proof. Alternatively, it has been suggested the name may come from the Arabic verb haratha meaning "to cultivate" which may have seemed plausible since the Haratin were known to be cultivators in the south of Morocco.

According to historian Remco Ensel – a professor of anthropology specializing in Maghreb studies, the word "Haratin" in Morocco is a pejorative that connotes "subordination, disrepute" and in contemporary literature; it is often replaced with "Drawi", "Drawa", "Sahrawi", "Sahrawa", or other regional terms. In southern Morocco, Haratin prefer Drawa contesting servile descent and taking offense to the name Haratin. Because of this, Sudanese scholar Mohamed Hassan Mohamed argues Haratin is an imposed identity. They also use the terms Ayt Drā (lit. 'people of the Drā') or Ayt Tmourt (lit. 'people of the land'). Ayt is a Berber term meaning "people of" or "children of". The usage of this term indicates that there was acculturation into Berber culture. The Haratin claim that these names are an assertion of their ancient presence in southern Morocco.

== History ==
The Haratin form an ethnic group distinct from Arab and Tuareg populations, as well as from the contemporary ethnic groups of sub-Saharan Africa. In Mauritania, however, where there are nearly 1.5 million Haratin, they have developed a separate sense of ethnic identity.

=== Origins ===
Despite it being commonly believed that the Haratin are entirely descended from Sub-Saharan slaves, they in part descend from groups native to southern Morocco and the northern Sahara. French academic André Adam attributed their origin mostly to inhabitants of the Sahara:

Little is known about the origin of these people [Haratin]. Some of them are the descendants of slaves captured by nomads south of the Sahara …It is likely however; that most of them are the descendants of black populations which once lived in the Sahara … We do not know when or how they adopted the Berber language. Indeed, some of them came under Arab influence.

— “Berber Migrants in Casablanca,” in Arabs and Berbers: From Tribe to Nation in North Africa

According to Nina Epton, who did field work in the Draa, there was a Haratin tradition that they descend from Ham, the son of Noah:

The Harratin relate that they are the descendents of Noah’s second son, Ham, and that once upon a time they used to be white. One day, however, Ham protected his head during a heavy rain-storm by carrying the Koran on top of it. The rain was so heavy that it washed all the characters of the holy book on to Ham’s skin; these characters, being sacred, were indelible, and so they turned Ham and his offspring black forever!

— Saints and Sorcerers, a Moroccan journey

During the Roman occupation of Mauretania, the Godala Berber tribe fled to the south towards the Draa oasis and enslaved the local Haratin population.

=== Legal status ===
They have historically inherited their slave status and family occupation, have been endogamous, and socially segregated. Some communities differentiated two types of slaves, one called 'Abid or "slave" and Haratin or "freed slave". However, per anthropologist John Shoup, both 'Abid and Haratin were not free to own land or had equivalent property rights. Regardless of whether they were technically free or not, they were treated as socially inferior in the communities they lived in. Being denied the right and the ability to own any land, they historically survived by accepting a patron-client serf relationship either as domestic servant or as share-cropping labor (khammasin).

=== Black Guard ===
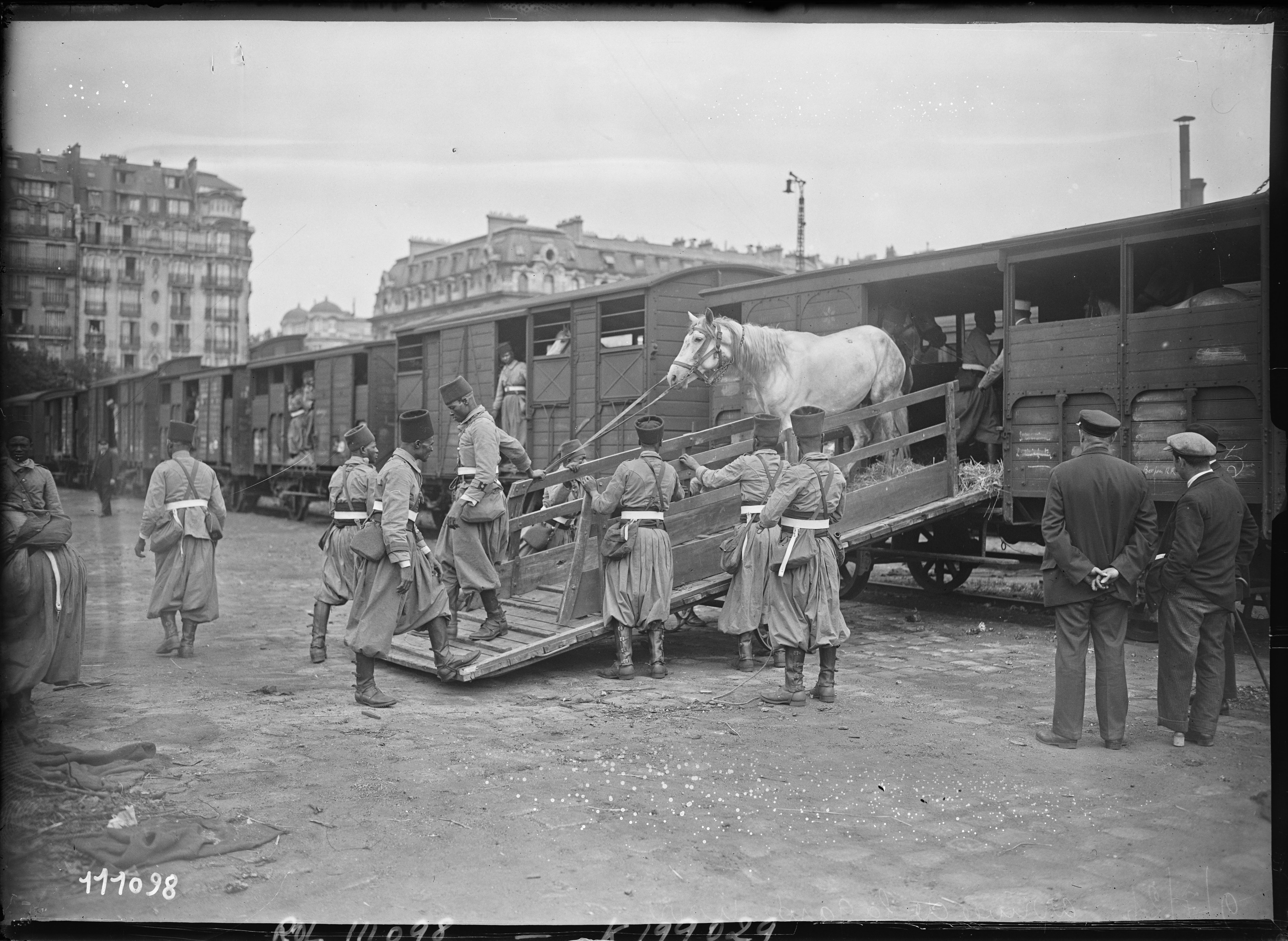
Black Guard of Yusef of Morocco

They became a common target of mandatory conscription by the Moroccan ruler Sultan Ismail Ibn Sharif (himself having a Haratin mother) as he sought to build a military that had no social or cultural attachment to any other Arab or Berber group in Maghreb. He conscripted the majority of able-bodied male Haratin and 'Abid that were present in Morocco at the time. This army was then commonly coerced into a series of wars in order to consolidate Ibn Sharif's power.

== Culture ==
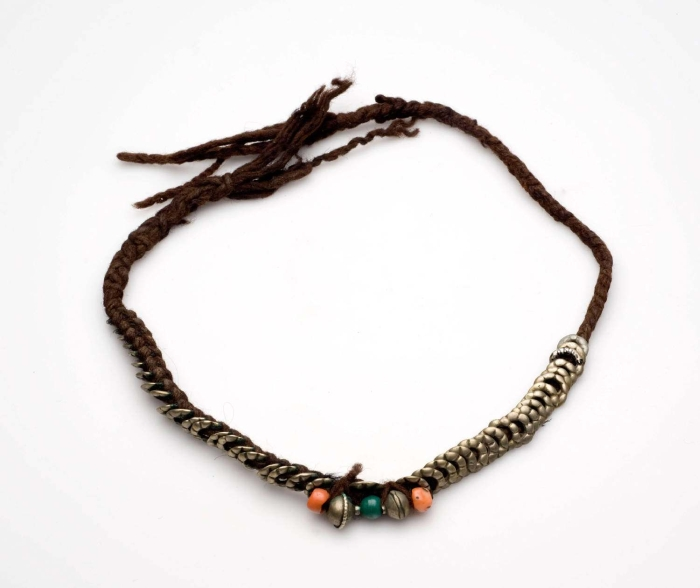
Tassfift, a headband worn by Haratin women

The Haratin speak Maghrebi Arabic dialects and Berber languages.

=== Music ===
In Mauritania, a lot of the music of the Haratin is dedicated to religion. For example, there is the Madih which are evening songs of men and women gathered around the tidinet lute, a kettledrum and a cyclical drum which are songs of praise for the Islamic prophet Muhammad. There is also dhikr which are devotional recitations accompanied instrumentally. The Bonjé (ambience) music genre consists of dance songs, praise songs and songs to welcome people. A famous opening piece of both the Madih and Bonjé is Bismillahi Bismirasul (In the name of God, in the name of the Prophet).

=== Architecture ===
The scholar Jeanne Marie Gentilleau identifies the "Haratin house" in the Draa valley as a house-granary designed for family living, protecting harvests and sheltering of animals. Gentilleau describes this house in the qsar as having a singular and central opening at the front which is the entrance to the hallway. The house has three levels to it and each are dedicated to one or more functions. The house is adapted to the pre-Saharan climate as well as the activity of its inhabitants who are oasis farmers.

== Haratin communities ==
The Haratin people are spread west of the Sahara Desert, mostly in Mauritania, Morocco, and Western Sahara. However, a small number are also spread across several countries, such as Senegal and Algeria.

=== Mauritania ===
In Mauritania, the Haratin form one of the largest ethnic groups and account for as much as 40% of the Mauritanians. They are sometimes referred to as "Black Moors", in contrast to Beidane, or "White Moors". The Haratin of Mauritania also primarily spoke Hassaniya Arabic.

The Haratin of Mauritania, according to anthropologist Joseph Hellweg, who specializes in West African studies, were historically part of a social caste-like hierarchy that likely developed from a Bedouin legacy between the 14th and 16th century. The "Hassan" monopolized the occupations related to war and politics, the "Zwaya" (Zawaya) the religious roles, the "Bidan" (White Moors) owned property and held slaves (Haratins, Black Moors). Each of these were immovable castes, endogamous, with hereditary occupations and where the upper strata collected tribute (horma) from the lower strata of Mauritanian society, considered them socially inferior, and denied them the right to own land or weapons thereby creating a socio-economically closed system.

In 1981, Mauritania officially abolished slavery. However, even after the formalities, abolishment, and new laws, discrimination against Haratin is still widespread, and many continue to be, for all practical purposes, enslaved, while large numbers live in other forms of informal dependence on their former masters. Although slavery was abolished by Presidential decree in 1981, it was not criminalized for the first time in 2007 and again in 2015, abolition in Mauritania is rarely enforced.

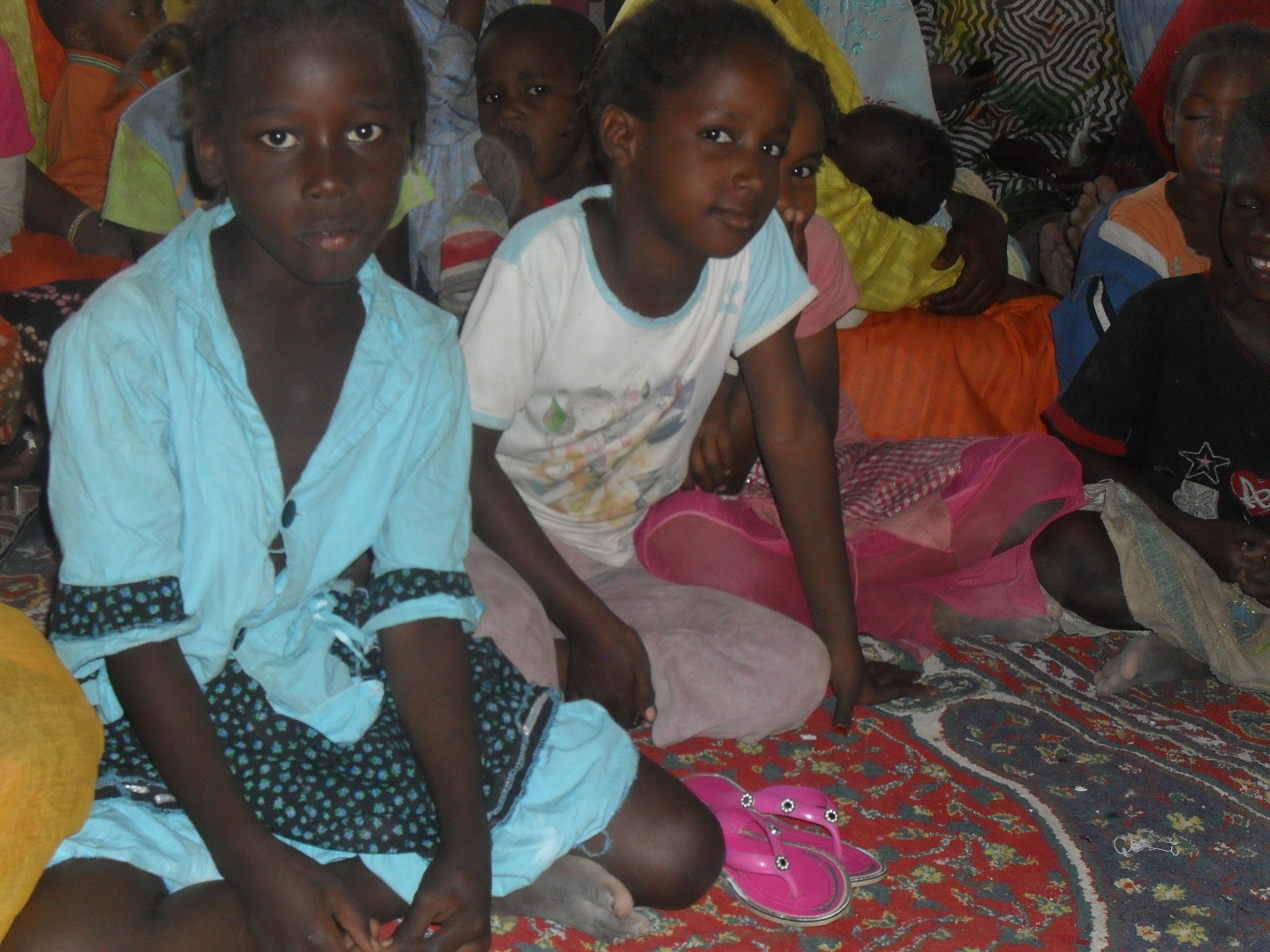
In Mauritania, the use of Haratin girls as servants has attracted the attention of activists.

Amnesty International reported that in 1994, 90,000 Haratine still lived as "property" of their master, with the report indicating that "slavery in Mauritania is most dominant within the traditional upper class of the Moors." According to Mauritanian officials, any master-serf relationship is mutually consensual. This position has been questioned by the United Nations and human rights advocacy groups.

The Amnesty International report states that "[s]social attitudes have changed among most urban Moors, but in rural areas, the ancient divide is still very alive." There have been many attempts to assess the real extension of slavery in modern Mauritania, but these have mostly been frustrated by the Nouakchott government's official stance that the practice has been eliminated. Amnesty further estimated that some 300,000 freed slaves continued to be in service of their former masters.

On 27 April 2007, Messaoud Ould Boulkheir was elected Speaker of the National Assembly, becoming the first black Haratin to hold the position.

=== Morocco ===
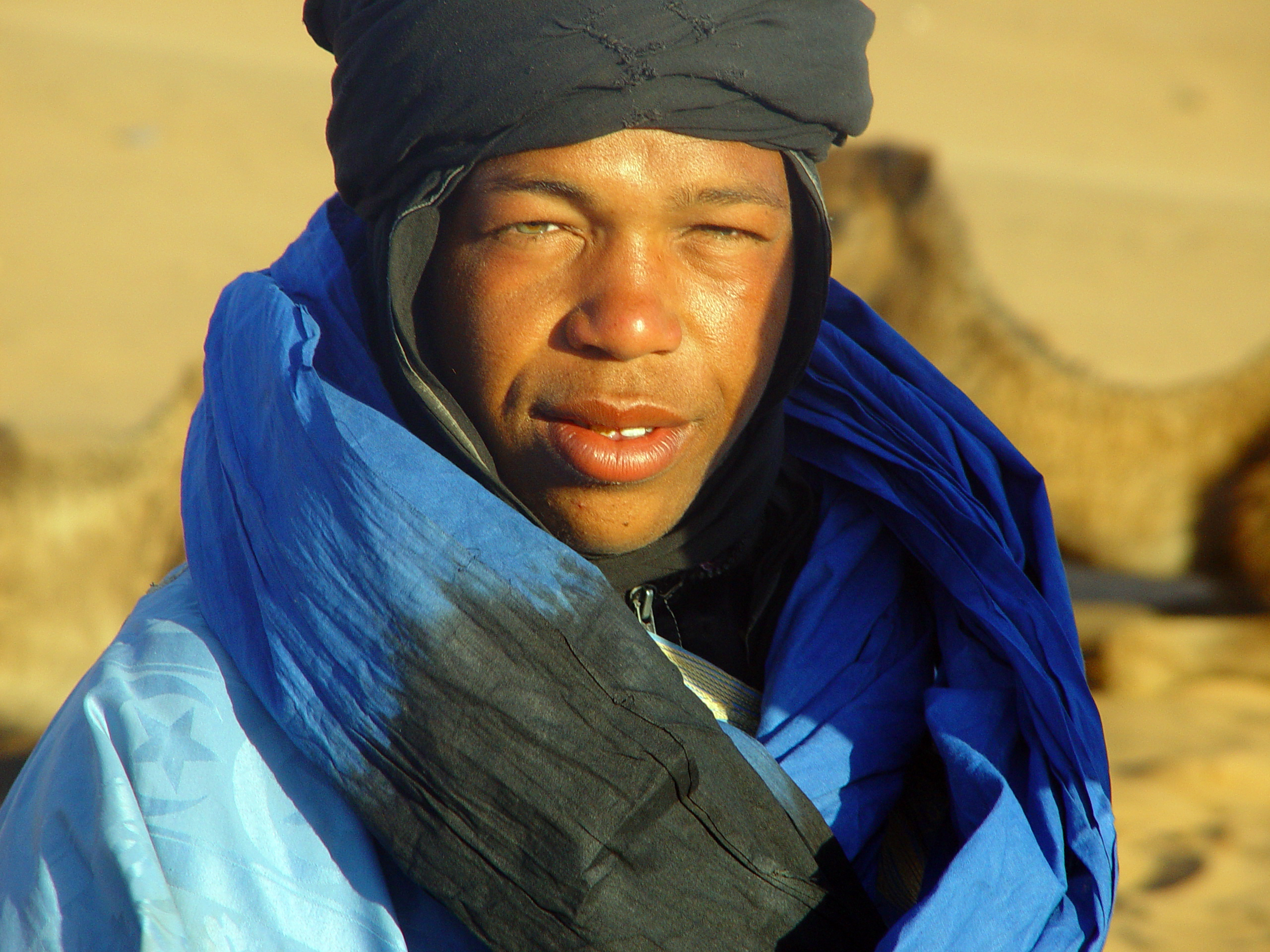
Haratin boy from the Draa valley

Haratin in Morocco are mostly concentrated in the southern part of the Drâa-Tafilalet region, specifically towns such as Zagora where they make up a significant portion of the populace. According to French explorer Charles de Foucauld, the Haratin may have formed a majority in southern Morocco with Haratin being nine-tenths of the population in some areas.

Haratin have been the slave strata of the Moroccan society through its recorded history. They were owned in every town and farming center before the time of Moroccan ruler Ismail Ibn Sharif. They provided domestic labor, farm labor, physical labor inside towns and markets, as well as were conscripted to fight wars.

According to Chouki El Hamel, a professor of history specializing in African Studies, the Moroccan Haratin may not be descendants of slaves of sub-Saharan origin but descend from native black populations who inhabited the south of Morocco. El Hamel claims that black Moroccans absorbed the "Arabo-centric values in the dominant interpretation of Islam" over the generations and they see themselves as Muslim Moroccans, rather than by their ethnic or native group.

The Haratin strata, as slave workers, were a major institution of Moroccan society through the 19th century. Yet, there has been a general lack of historical records about their origins and ethnography, leading to several constructed proposals, and their mention in older Moroccan literature is generally limited to their status as slaves and more focused on the rights on their owners. It is their contemporary economic and social marginalization that has awakened renewed interest in their history and their oral histories.

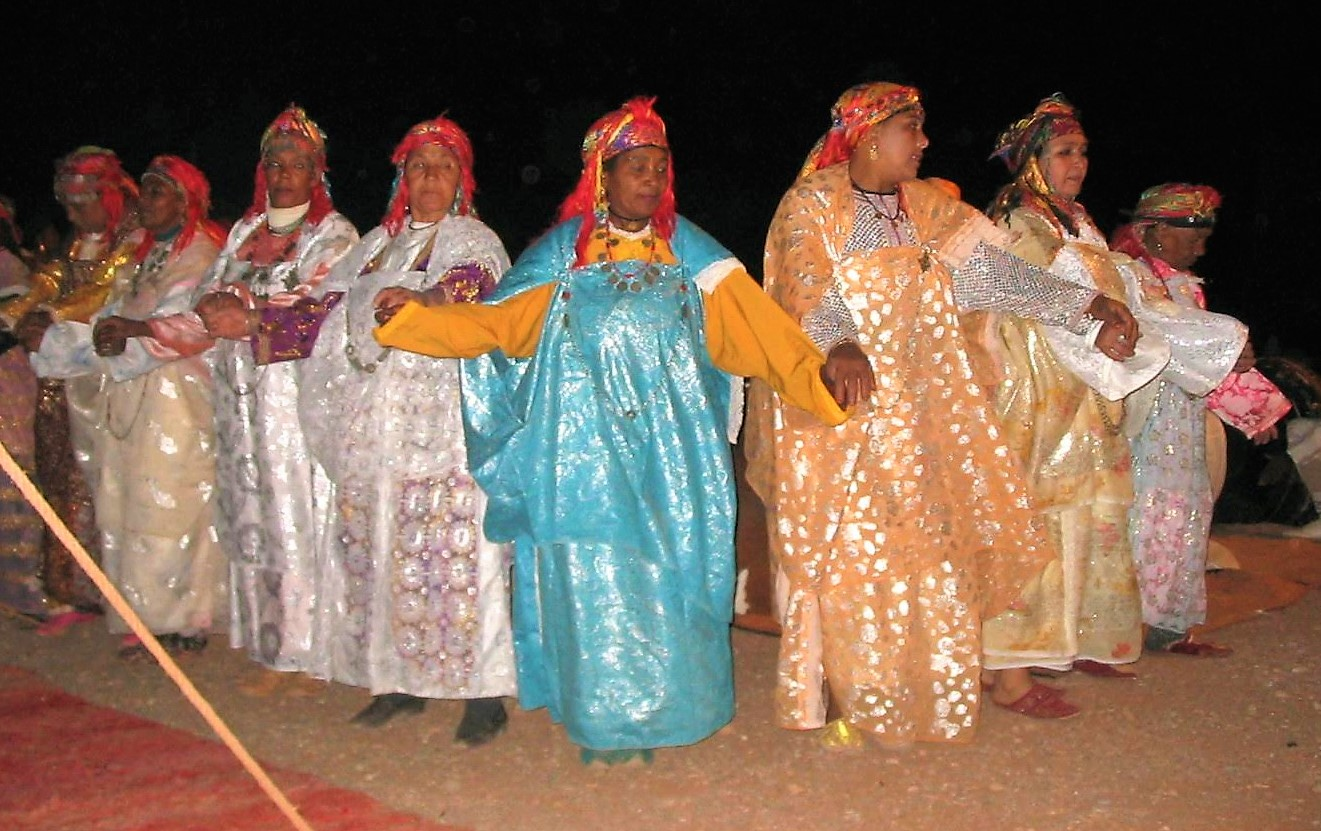
Haratin women from Telouet performing Ahwash

The Haratins remain indispensable workers in modern oases societies, states Ensel, and continue to be mistreated in contrast to the upper strata called the "Shurfa". According to Remco Ensel, Haratin, along with Swasin in Morocco and other northern fringe societies of the Sahara, were a part of a social hierarchy that included the upper strata of nobles, religious specialists, and literati, followed by freemen, nomadic pastoral strata, and slaves. The Haratin were hierarchically higher than the 'Abid (descendant of slaves) at the very bottom, but lower than Ahrar. This hierarchy, states Ensel, has been variously described as ethnic groups, estates, quasi-castes, castes, or classes.

The Haratins historically lived segregated from the main society, in a rural isolation. Their subjugation was sometimes ideologically justified by nobles and some religious scholars, even though others disagreed. The social stratification of Haratin and their inter-relationships with others members of the society varied by valley and oasis, but whether the Haratins were technically 'unfreed, semi-freed, or freed' slaves, they were considered as "inferior" by other strata of the society. The Haratin remain a marginalized population of Morocco, just like other similar groups around the world.

=== Western Sahara ===
According to Human Rights Watch, Morocco alleges that slavery is widespread in the Sahrawi refugee camps run by the Polisario Front in southwestern Algeria; Polisario denies this and claims to have eradicated slavery through awareness campaigns. A 2009 investigative report by Human Rights Watch interviewed some dark-skinned Sahrawi people, who are a small minority in the camps; they stated that some "blacks" are "owned" by "whites", but this ownership is manifested only in "granting" marriage rights to girls. In other words, a dark-skinned girl must have an approval from her "master". Without this, the marriage cannot be performed by a qadi.

The report notes that Polisario claims to oppose any such discrimination, but raises questions about possible official collusion in, or indifference to, the practice. In addition, a case of an official document that grants freedom to a group of enslaved families has been found by HRW. The document in question dates as recently as 2007. The document was signed by a local judge or an official civil servant. Slavery is still engraved in memories due to historical and traditional reasons, and such cases are not as shocking as one might think to the society of the Sahrawi refugee camps. The Human Rights Watch concludes its chapter on slavery as follows, "In sum, credible sources testified to Human Rights Watch about vestiges of slavery that continue to affect the lives of a portion of the black minority in the Tindouf camps. The practices involve historical ties between families that involve certain rights and obligations that are not always clear. Being a slave does not necessarily preclude enjoying freedom of movement."

Responding to questions about slavery, the Polisario has acknowledged the survival "to a limited extent, of certain practices related to antiquated thinking" and said it was "determined to combat and eradicate them whenever they emerge and no matter what shape they take." "We welcome this statement and urge the Polisario to be vigilant in pursuing this objective," said HRW.

=== Algeria ===
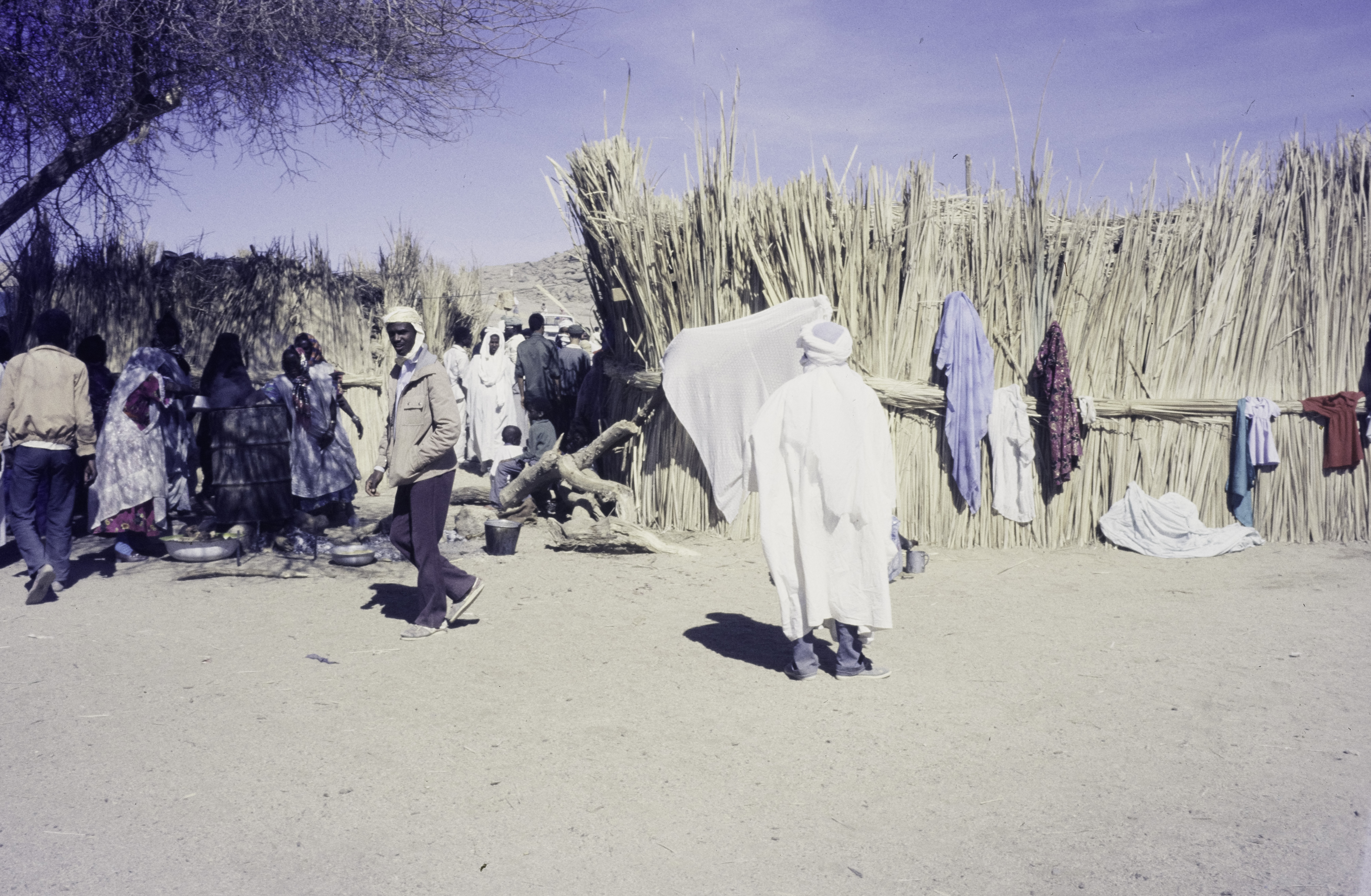
Haratin man with white scarf from Tamanrasset

In the Algerian Sahara, the Haratin, who were marginalized by France during colonization, experienced social and political progress after the country's independence. This integration had started during the war of liberation; a discourse of emancipation and the absence of state racism, which constitutes a tradition of Algerian nationalism, had succeeded in mobilizing this social category. Social success through education allowed the former Haratin to be represented in local communities and to access the most influential positions.

In the late 19th century, they formed 40% of the population in Touat.

== See also ==
- Gnawa
- Ikelan

== Bibliography ==
- Ilahiane, Hsain (1998). The Power of the Dagger, the Seeds of the Koran, and the Sweat of the Ploughman: Ethnic Stratification and Agricultural Intensification in the Ziz Valley. Southeast Morocco. Vol. 107, 7. unpublished dissertation: University of Arizona. hdl:10150/288865.
- El Hamel, Chouki (Fall 2002). "'Race', Slavery and Islam in the Maghribi Mediterranean Thought: The Question of the Haratin in Morocco". Journal of North African Studies. 29 (38). doi:10.1080/13629380208718472.
- Batrán, Aziz Abdalla (1985). "The 'Ulama' of Fas, Mulay Isma'il and the Issue of the Haratin of Fas". In Willis, John Ralph (ed.). Slaves and Slavery in Muslim Africa. Vol. 1: Islam and the Ideology of Enslavement. London: Frank Cass. pp. 1–16.
- Ensel, Remco (1999). Saints and Servants in Southern Morocco. Leiden: Brill. ISBN 9789004491717.
- Hunwick, J O. "Black Slaves in the Mediterranean World: introduction to a Neglected Aspect of the African Diaspora". Journal of African History.
- Ennaji, Mohammed (1998). Serving The Master: Slavery & Society in Nineteenth-Century Morocco. Translated by Graebner, Seth. St. Martin's Press. ISBN 9780312211523.
- Amnesty International, 7 November 2002, Mauritania, A future free from slavery? The formal abolition of slavery in 1981 has not led to real and effective abolition for various reasons, including a lack of legislation to ensure its implementation.
- El Hamel, Chouki (2014). Black Morocco A History of Slavery, Race, and Islam. Cambridge University Press. ISBN 9781139620048.
- Mohamed, Mohamed Hassan (22 February 2012). Between Caravan and Sultan: The Bayruk of Southern Morocco: A Study in History and Identity. Brill. ISBN 978-90-04-18379-7.
- Gentilleau, Jeanne Marie (11 January 2016). Habitat et mode de vie de la vallée du Drā (Maroc) : le village d'Asrir n'llemchane [Habitat and way of life in the Drā Valley (Morocco): the village of Asrir n'llemchane] (PhD thesis) (in French). University of Lyon.
