= Beni Ḥassān =

Arab tribe

Beni Hassan بني حسان
- Map of areas where Hassaniya Arabic is spoken
- Ethnicity: Arab
- Location: Western Sahara, Mauritania, Morocco, Algeria
- Parent tribe: Beni Maqil
- Language: Hassaniya Arabic
- Religion: Sunni Islam

Beni Ḥassān (Arabic: بني حسان, lit. 'sons of Ḥassān') is a Bedouin Arab tribe which inhabits Western Sahara, Mauritania, Morocco and Algeria. It is one of the four sub-tribes of the Banu Maqil who emigrated in the 11th century from South Arabia to the Maghreb with the Banu Hilal and Banu Sulaym Arab tribes. In the 13th century, they took the Sanhaja territories in the southwest of the Sahara. In Morocco, they first settled, alongside their Maqil relatives, in the area between Tadla and the Moulouya River. The Sous Almohad governor called upon them for help against a rebellion in the Sous, and they resettled in and around that region. They later moved to what is today Mauritania, and from the 16th century onwards, they managed to push back all black peoples southwards to the Senegal Valley river. The Beni Hassan and other warrior Arab tribes dominated the Sanhaja Berber tribes of the area after the Char Bouba war of the 17th century. As a result, Arabs became the dominant ethnic group in Western Sahara and Mauretania. The Bani Hassan dialect of Arabic became used in the region and is still spoken, in the form of Hassaniya Arabic. The hierarchy established by the Beni Hassan tribe gave Mauritania much of its sociological character. That ideology has led to oppression, discrimination and even enslavement of other groups in Mauritania.

== Origin ==
Beni Hassan are one of the four sub-tribes of Beni Maqil who emigrated to the Maghreb in the 11th century. The exact origin of the Beni Maqil tribe is unknown, although it has been established that they most likely originated in South Arabia (Yemen). The Maqil claimed Hashemite descent from Ja'far ibn Abi Talib, while some Arabian genealogists categorized them as Hilalians. Ibn Khaldun said both of these versions are false and that Maqil is most likely an Arab nomadic group from Yemen.

The tradition of Beni Hassan states that they were descendants of Hasan ibn Ali, son of Ali ibn Abi Talib, Muhammad's son-in-law and a leading figure in Shia Islam, although the Beni Hassan were Sunni Muslims. The Sahrawi nation includes the Beni Hassan as part of its founding peoples and Hassaniya Arabic as part of its national identity. There is also a Beni Hassan Bedouin tribe in northern Jordan.

Beni Hassan's descendants and other tribes that arrived from Yemen in the 13th century are considered among the clean-blooded Arab tribes. For example, the Oulad Delim who trace their origin back to Beni Hassan are the most populous tribe in Western Sahara and consider themselves the cleanest blooded Arabs in the Sahel.

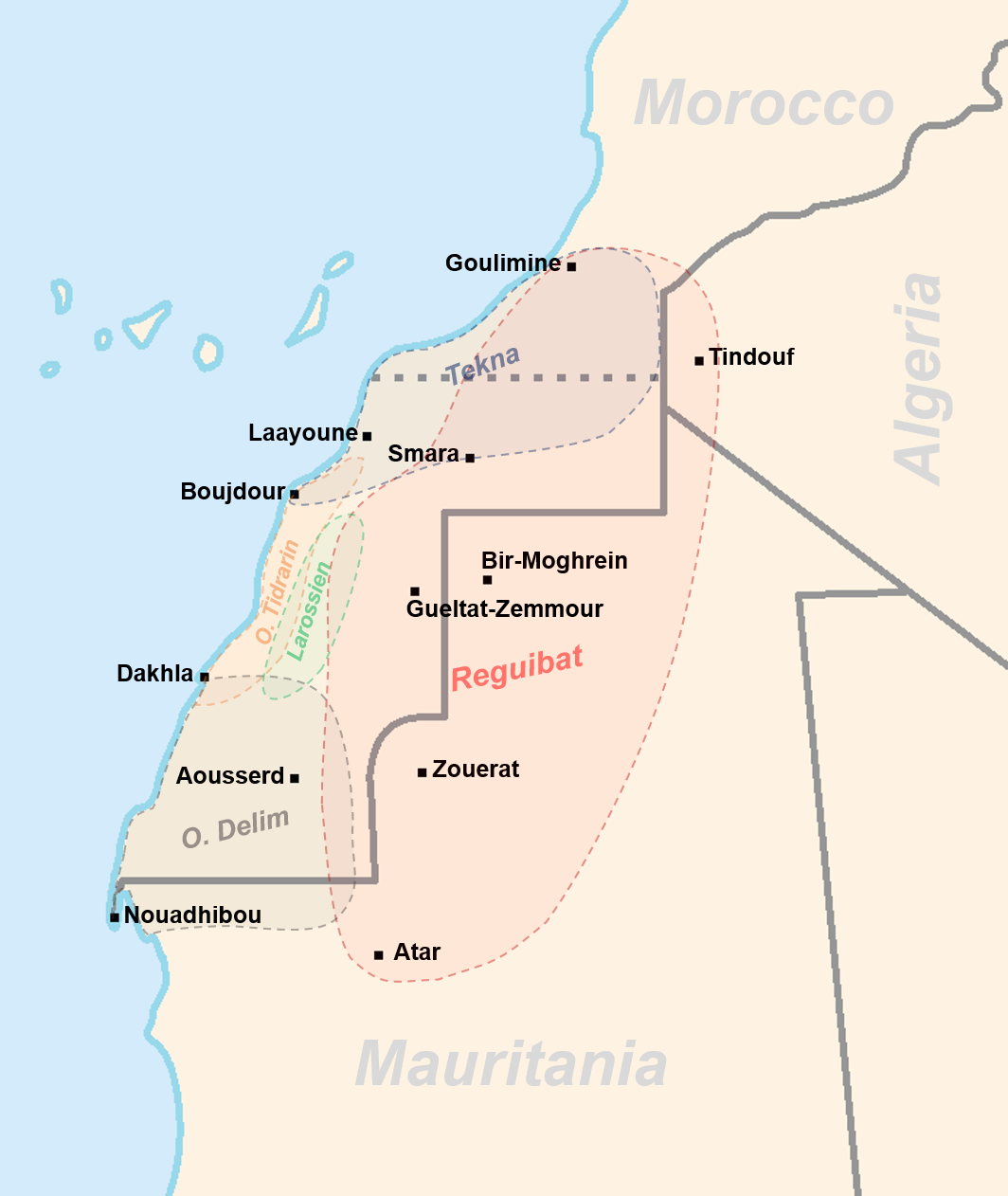
The Sahrawi nation includes Beni Hassan as part of its founding people

== History ==
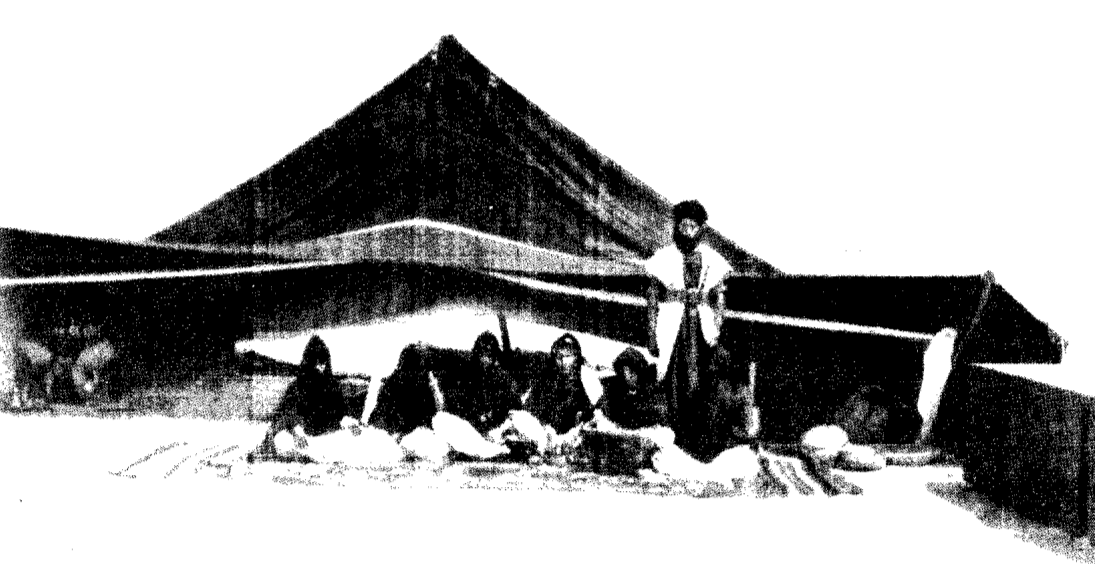
Saharan family in the 1970s

=== Migration to the Maghreb ===
Various sources point to the Maqil tribe as the origin from which the Beni Hassan tribe was formed. The Ma'qils entered the Maghreb during the wave of emigration of the Arabian tribes in the 11th century, and since then, they were situated in North Africa together with other Bedouin Arab tribes that migrated from the Arabian Peninsula such as the Banu Hilal and the Banu Sulaym, with whom they shared great skill as warriors and a destructive capacity for the nations they attacked.

The Bedouin tribes were sent into the Maghreb by the Fatimids to punish the Zirids for switching allegiance to the rival Abbasid Caliphate. They were compared to Mughal warriors centuries later. They adapted perfectly to the climatic desert conditions of the Maghreb, discovering the same way of life as in the Arabian Peninsula. The Banu Sulaym opposed the Maqil's arrival and fought them off. The Maqil later allied with the Banu Hilal and entered under their protection, which enabled them to wander in the Moroccan desert between the Moulouya River and Tafilalt oases.

In the 13th century, they occupied southern Algeria and dominated the oases of Tuat and Gourara. For some authors, at this point, the Maqil group had already disintegrated into different populations in the Maghreb and had given rise to the Beni Hassan along with other related groups.

=== Conquest of the Sanhaja ===
The Beni Hassan continued their expansion to the southwest and occupied Sanhaja lands in the 13th century after invading and defeating this Berber confederation with the Lamtuna, Masmuda, Djuddala, Gazula, Banu Warith, Lamta and Tuareg, in a group known as the Baranis in Western Sahara.

The Sanhaja has long had to pay tribute to the nomadic Bedouin Hassani invaders. The invasion was quick and effective and happened around the year 1250, by the end of the Almohad Caliphate, and also dominated the valleys of the Moulouya, Draa, Sous, as well as the Tafilalt oasis region.

=== Migration to Morocco ===
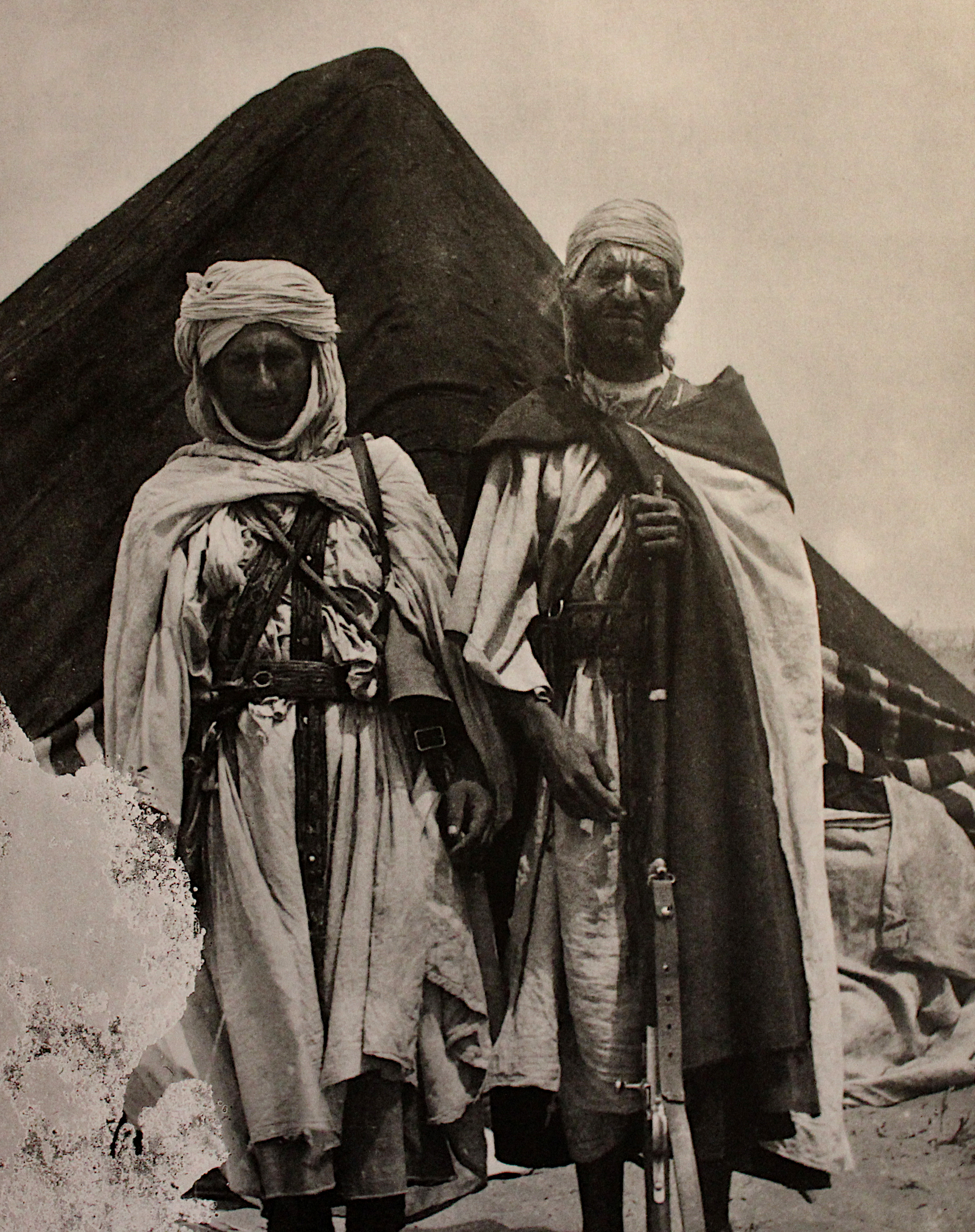
Oulad Delim is a sub-tribe of Beni Hassan

By the mid-15th century, the Beni Hassan controlled a large part of the oases and Western Sahara. They crossed into the Atlas after taking advantage of the weakening Marinid Sultanate around 1460 and then they dominated the Haouz region of Marrakesh by the beginning of the 16th century. At the same time, a part of the Beni Hassan made its way to Mauritania. Other groups migrated north through Tafilalt to Fez or up the Sebou and Bou Regreg rivers, where some settled south of Rabat.

The Hassanis were represented in the Haouz of Marrakech by the Rahamna, who were brought north to respond to the military needs of the Saadian Sultanate in the early 16th century. Two of the prominent Hassani communities during the late 'Alawi period were the Jaysh al-Udaya and the Shabbanat. The former were invited by the sultan of Morocco Ismail Ibn Sharif (1672–1727), while the latter controlled Marrakesh when sultan Al-Rashid arrived to conquer it.

=== Char Bouba War ===
Historical accounts report that these Hassani communities enriched themselves by collecting tolls from trade caravans and extorting farming and herding villages settled in the oases. They were accused of subjecting these territories to two centuries of looting and intermittent wars, but at the same time they point out that their families settled in the same towns that they attacked and subjugated. This took place during the Char Bouba War from 1644 to 1674, which after decades of confrontations ended up completely Arabizing the native Berber population, destroying their language and culture and giving rise to the contemporary Sahrawi people.

The Char Bouba War was led by Sidi Ibrahim Al Aroussi, son of the famous Cheikh Sidi Ahmed Al Aroussi (died in 1593, near to Smara, in Western Sahara). Al Aroussi, with his two sons Shanan Al Aroussi and Sidi Tounsi Al Aroussi, led a powerful force of the Beni Hassan, the Aroussi Army, to conquer the Berber Imarat in modern-day Mauritania and gain access to Bilad as-Sudan ("the Land of the Blacks", in Senegal and Mali).

In 1673, Nasr al-Din began invaded Futa Tooro and the various Wolof states beyond the Senegal River. By focusing on the states south of the Senegal, Nasr al-Din avoided an early confrontation with the powerful Beni Hassan. Nasr al-Din's focus on these states gained him control of the entrepôts for the gum trade along the Senegal. French trade on the Senegal had seen large growth since the beginning of the century, and thus control of the entrepôts strengthened Nasr al-Din financially, whilst offsetting the Hassan control of the trade to the ports on the Saharan coast.

The Beni Hassan were united in their opposition to Nasr al-Din. Most of the burden of fighting fell to the Emirate of Trarza, although the Emirate of Brakna sent Trarza reinforcements and helped immobilise Zawaya in their own regions to prevent them from joining the forces of Nasr. Most Zawaya of the Southern Sahara sided with Nasr, although some remained neutral, and others supported the Beni Hassan, with a Zawaya scholar from Shinqit issuing a fatwa against Nasr, stating that he was not a Caliph and had no right to impose the zakat. This fatwa led to Hãdi, the Trarza chief, sending troops to seize animals that had already been sent as zakat.

In 1674, the Beni Hassan defeated the Marabout Berbers, and after achieving political and military hegemony in the area, they founded the emirates of Trarza, Brakna, Tagant, Adrar and Hodh. The marabouts were Berbers who followed the Islamic doctrine of Nasr al-Din imposed in Senegal in the mid-17th century. The war ended in defeat for the Berber tribes, and they were from that point on forced to surrender their arms and submit to the warrior Arab tribes, to whom they paid the horma tributary tax. They would remain in roles as either exploited semi-sedentary agriculturalists and fishermen (znaga tribes), or, higher up on the social ladder, as religious (marabout or zawiya) tribes. This division between Hassane Arab warriors and Berber marabouts, plus the subordinate znaga, existed in Mauritania up until the French colonization, when France imposed itself militarily on all tribes, and so broke the power of the Hassane. Still, the traditional roles of the tribes remain important socially in these areas.

=== Before French colonization ===
Following the pre-Islamic tradition of tribal warfare between clans in the Arabian Peninsula, the new Hassani emirates repeatedly went to war with each other. Throughout the 18th century, they harassed the Wolof in Senegal. Throughout this period, they spread their dialect and culture throughout the desert area of Western Sahara. In the 19th century, they led the consolidation of the process of cultural and linguistic Arabization of Mauritania. By the end of the 19th century, the Zenaga Berber language was completely annihilated.

== Beni Hassan sub-tribes ==
- The descendants of Hassan ben Mokhtar ben Mohamed, son of the forefather of the Maqils
- The Shebanat: descendants of Shebana, brother of Hassan, and son of Mokhtar ben Mohamed
- The Reguitat: descendants of Jallal, Salem and Uthman, brothers of Mokhtar and sons of Mohamed

Several other Arab tribes joined the Maqils and became part of the Beni Hassan tribe.

== Notable people ==
- Sidi Ahmed Reguibi

== See also ==
- Maqil
- Banu Sulaym
- Banu Hilal
- Char Bouba war
- North African Arabs
