= Horma =

Tribute paid by tribes to their protectors in Sahrawi-Moorish society

The horma was a tribute paid by subservient tribes to their protectors in traditional Sahrawi-Moorish society in today's Mauritania and Western Sahara in North Africa. The powerful Hassane warrior tribes would extract it from low-caste Znaga tribes, where each member was forced to personally pay an overlord in the dominant tribe. The forms and rates of horma varied throughout the region and through history, and was normally dependent on the relations of strength between the tribes involved. It could be paid in cattle, goods or services.
