= Hassaniya Arabic =

Maghrebi Arabic dialect spoken by Mauritanians and Sahrawi

Hassaniya
- Mauritanian Arabic
- حسانية (Ḥassāniyya)
- Native to: southwestern Algeria, northwestern Mali, Western Sahara
- Ethnicity: Arabs; Arab-Berbers (Sahrawis; Beidane); Haratins; Nemadis; Imraguen
- Speakers: 5.6 million (2021–2023)
- Language family: Afro-Asiatic: Semitic; West Semitic; Central Semitic; Arabic; Maghrebi; Hilalian; Hassaniya
- Dialects: Nemadi; Imraguen
- Writing system: Arabic alphabet, Latin alphabet (in Senegal)

Official status
- Official language in: Mali
- Recognised minority language in: Morocco; Senegal

Language codes
- ISO 639-3: mey
- Glottolog: hass1238
- Current distribution of the Hassaniya language.

Hassaniya Arabic (Arabic: حسانية, romanized: Ḥassāniyya; also known as Hassaniyya, Klam El Bithan, Hassani, Hassaniya, and Maure) is a variety of Maghrebi Arabic spoken by Mauritanian Arabs, Malian Arabs and the Sahrawis. It was spoken by the Beni Ḥassān Bedouin tribes of Yemeni origin who extended their authority over most of Mauritania and Western Sahara between the 15th and 17th centuries. Hassaniya Arabic was the language spoken in the pre-modern region around Chinguetti.

The language has completely replaced the Berber languages that were originally spoken in this region. Although clearly a western dialect, Hassaniya is relatively distant from other Maghrebi variants of Arabic. Its geographical location exposed it to influence from Zenaga-Berber and Pulaar. There are several dialects of Hassaniya, which differ primarily phonetically. There are still traces of South Arabian in Hassaniya Arabic spoken between Rio de Oro and Timbuktu, according to G. S. Colin.

Today, Hassaniya Arabic is spoken in Algeria, Morocco, Mauritania, Mali, Niger, Senegal, Burkina Faso, and the Western Sahara.

== Phonology ==
The phonological system of Hassānīya exhibits both very innovative and very conservative features. All phonemes of Classical Arabic are represented in the dialect (with the exception of /dˤ/ and /ðˤ/, which have merged into /ðˤ/), but there are also many new phonemes. As in other Bedouin dialects, Classical /q/ corresponds mostly to dialectal /ɡ/, and the interdentals /θ/ and /ð/ have been preserved. The letter ج /d͡ʒ/ is realized as /ʒ/.

However, there is sometimes a double correspondence of a classical sound and its dialectal counterpart. Thus, classical /q/ is represented by /ɡ/ in /ɡbaðˤ/ 'to take' but by /q/ in /mqass/ 'scissors'. Similarly, /dˤ/ becomes /ðˤ/ in /ðˤəħk/ 'laugh (noun)', but /dˤ/ in /mrˤədˤ/ 'to be sick'. Some consonant roots even have a double appearance: /θaqiːl/ 'heavy (mentally)' vs. /θɡiːl/ 'heavy (materially)'. Some of the "classicizing" forms are easily explained as recent loans from the literary language (such as /qaː.nuːn/ 'law') or from sedentary dialects in case of concepts pertaining to the sedentary way of life (such as /mqass/ 'scissors' above). For others, there is no obvious explanation (like /mrˤədˤ/ 'to be sick'). Etymological /ðˤ/ appears constantly as /ðˤ/, never as /dˤ/.

Nevertheless, the phonemic status of /q/ and /dˤ/ as well as /ɡ/ and /ðˤ/ appears very stable, unlike in many other Arabic varieties. Somewhat similarly, classical /ʔ/ has in most contexts disappeared or turned into /w/ or /j/ (/ahl/ 'family' instead of /ʔahl/, /wak.kad/ 'insist' instead of /ʔak.kad/ and /jaː.məs/ 'yesterday' instead of /ʔams/). In some literary terms, however, it is clearly preserved: /mət.ʔal.lam/ 'suffering (participle)' (classical /mu.ta.ʔal.lim/).

=== Consonants ===
Hassānīya has innovated many consonants by the spread of the distinction emphatic/non-emphatic. In addition to the above-mentioned, /rˤ/ and /lˤ/ have a clear phonemic status and /bˤ fˤ ɡˤ mˤ nˤ/ more marginally so. One additional emphatic phoneme /zˤ/ is acquired from the neighboring Zenaga Berber language along with a whole palatal series /c ɟ ɲ/ from Niger–Congo languages of the south. At least some speakers make the distinction /p/–/b/ through borrowings from French (and Spanish in Western Sahara). All in all, the number of consonant phonemes in Hassānīya is 31, or 43 counting the marginal cases.

Consonant phonemes of Hassaniya Arabic
		Labial		Interdental		Dental/Alveolar		Palatal	Velar	Uvular	Pharyngeal	Glottal
		plain	emphatic	plain	emphatic	plain	emphatic	Palatal	Velar	Uvular	Pharyngeal	Glottal
Nasal		m	mˤ			n	(nˤ)	ɲ				
Stop	voiceless	(p)				t	tˤ	c	k	q		(ʔ)
Stop	voiced	b	bˤ			d	dˤ	ɟ	ɡ	(gˤ)		
Affricate								(t͡ʃ)				
Fricative	voiceless	f		θ		s	sˤ	ʃ		χ	ħ	h
Fricative	voiced	v	(vˤ)	ð	ðˤ	z	zˤ	ʒ		ʁ	ʕ	
Trill						r	rˤ					
Approximant						l	lˤ	j	w			

On the phonetic level, the classical consonants /f/ and /θ/ are usually realised as voiced [v] (hereafter marked /v/) and [θ̬]. The latter is still, however, pronounced differently from /ð/, the distinction probably being in the amount of air blown out (Cohen 1963: 13–14). In geminated and word-final positions both phonemes are voiceless, for some speakers /θ/ apparently in all positions. The uvular fricative /ʁ/ is likewise realised voiceless in a geminated position, although not fricative but plosive: [qː]. In other positions, etymological /ʁ/ seems to be in free variation with /q/ (etymological /q/, however varies only with /ɡ/).

=== Vowels ===
Vowel phonemes come in two series: long and short. The long vowels are the same as in Classical Arabic /aː iː uː/, and the short ones extend this by one: /a i u ə/. The classical diphthongs /aj/ and /aw/ may be realised in many different ways, the most usual variants being [eːʲ] and [oːʷ], respectively. Still, realisations like [aj] and [aw] as well as [eː] and [oː] are possible, although less common.

As in most Maghrebi Arabic dialects, etymological short vowels are generally dropped in open syllables (except for the feminine noun ending /-a/ < /-ah/): */tak.tu.biː/ > /tə.ktbi/ 'you (f. sg.) write', */ka.ta.ba/ > */ka.tab/ > /ktəb/ 'he wrote'. In the remaining closed syllables dialectal /a/ generally corresponds to classical /a/, while classical /i/ and /u/ have merged into /ə/. Remarkably, however, morphological /j/ is represented by [i] and /w/ by [u] in a word-initial pre-consonantal position: /u.ɡəft/ 'I stood up' (root w-g-f; cf. /ktəbt/ 'I wrote', root k-t-b), /i.naɡ.ɡaz/ 'he descends' (subject prefix i-; cf. /jə.ktəb/ 'he writes', subject prefix jə-). In some contexts, this initial vowel even gets lengthened, which clearly demonstrates its phonological status of a vowel: /uːɡ.vu/ 'they stood up'. In addition, short vowels /a i/ in open syllables are found in Berber loanwords, such as /a.raː.ɡaːʒ/ 'man', /i.vuː.kaːn/ 'calves of 1 to 2 years of age', and /u/ in passive formation: /u.ɡaː.bəl/ 'he was met' (cf. /ɡaː.bəl/ 'he met').

== Code-switching ==
Many educated Hassaniya Arabic speakers also practice code-switching. In Western Sahara it is common for code-switching to occur between Hassaniya Arabic, Modern Standard Arabic, and Spanish, as Spain had previously controlled this region; in the rest of Hassaniya-speaking lands, French is the additional language spoken.

== Orthography ==
Hassaniya Arabic is normally written with an Arabic script. However, in Senegal, the government has adopted the use of the Latin script to write the language, as established by Decree 2005–980 of October 21, 2005.

Hassaniya Arabic alphabet (Senegal)
A	B	C	D	Ḍ	E	Ë	F	G	H	Ḥ	I	J	K	L	M	N	Ñ	O	Q	R	S	Ṣ	Ŝ	T	Ṭ	Ŧ	U	V	W	X	Ẋ	Y	Z	Ż	Ẓ	ʔ
a	b	c	d	ḍ	e	ë	f	g	h	ḥ	i	j	k	l	m	n	ñ	o	q	r	s	ṣ	ŝ	t	ṭ	ŧ	u	v	w	x	ẋ	y	z	ż	ẓ	ʼ

== Speakers distribution ==
According to Ethnologue, there are approximately three million Hassaniya speakers, distributed as follows:

- Mauritania: 2,770,000 (2006)
- Western Sahara and the southern area of Morocco, known as the Tekna zone: 200,000+ (1995)
- Mali: 175,800 – 210,000 (2000)
- Senegal: 162,000 (2015)
- Algeria: 150,000 (1985)
- Libya: 40,000 (1985)
- Niger: 10,000 (1998)
- Burkina Faso: 4,000 (2020)

== See also ==
- Varieties of Arabic
- Nemadi dialect
- Imraguen people
