= Al-Fasi =

Al-Fassi or Al-Fasi is a surname. Notable people with the name include:

- Imam Fassi (c. 1760 CE – c. 1863 CE), Moroccan imam
  - al-Fassi family, constituting the Fassiyatush Shadhiliyya Sufi order
- Abbas El Fassi (born 1940), Moroccan politician
- Abd al-Qadir al-Fasi (1599–1680), Moroccan writer
- Abd al-Rahman al-Fasi (1631–1685), Moroccan writer
- Abu Imran al-Fasi (974–1015), Moroccan writer
- Abu l-Mahasin Yusuf al-Fasi (c. 1530 – 1604), Moroccan theologian
- Ahmad ibn Idris al-Fasi (1760–1837), Moroccan theologian
- Ahmad Zarruq al-Barnusi al-Fasi (1442–1493), Moroccan scholar and writer
- Al-Hassan al-Wazzan al-Fasi or Leo Africanus (c. 1494 – c. 1554), Moroccan geographer
- Allal al-Fassi (1910–1974), Moroccan politician, writer, poet and Islamic scholar
- Asia Alfasi (born 1984), Libyan-British comic writer and artist
- David ben Abraham al-Fasi (died before 1026 CE), lexicographer
- Eric Alfasi (born 1970), Israeli basketball player and coach
- Hamdun ibn al-Hajj al-Fasi (1760–1817), Moroccan scholar
- Hatoon al-Fassi (born 1964), Saudi Arabian historian
- Isaac Alfasi (1013–1103), Moroccan Talmudist, posek and rabbi
- Malika al-Fassi (1908–1991), Moroccan writer and nationalist
- Masa'ud Raphael Alfasi (died 1776), Tunisian rabbi
- Mohammed al-Mahdi al-Fasi, Moroccan biographer and historian
- Mohammed ibn Hajj al-Abdari al-Fasi (c. 1258 – 1336), Moroccan writer
- Mohammed ibn Kiran al-Fasi (1758–1812), Moroccan religious scholar and politician
- Mohammed ibn Zakri al-Fasi (died 1731), Moroccan writer
- Taqi al-Din Muhammad ibn Ahmad al-Fasi (1373–1429), scholar and judge

== See also ==
- Fassi
- El Fassi
- Fasi (disambiguation)
