= Fassi =

Fassi is a surname. Notable people with the surname include:

- Abdelkader Fassi Fehri (born 1947), Moroccan linguist
- Aphelele Fassi (born 1998), South African professional rugby union player
- Carlo Fassi (1929–1997), Italian figure skater and international coach
- Farida Fassi, Moroccan professor of physics
- Hatoon al-Fassi (born 1964), Saudi Arabian historian, author and women's rights activist
- Juan Pablo Fassi (born 1994), retired professional Mexican footballer
- Imam Fassi (1760?–1863), originator of the Fassi family of Sheikhs
- María Fassi (born 1998), Mexican professional golfer
- Sebastián Fassi (born 1993), Mexican professional footballer
- Sonwabile Fassi (born 1991), South African former cricketer

== Al Fassi ==
- Allal al-Fassi (1910–1974), Moroccan politician, writer, poet and Islamic scholar
- Taieb Fassi Fihri (born 1958), Moroccan politician
- Mohammed al Fassi (1952–2002), Saudi businessman
- Malika al-Fassi (1919–2007), Moroccan writer and nationalist

== See also ==
- Al-Fasi
- El Fassi
- Allal al Fassi Dam, embankment dam on the Sebou River in Morocco
- Zawiya of Sidi Abdelkader al-Fassi
