= Cheikh Al Kamel Mausoleum =

Historic religious complex in Mekness, Morocco

- Arabic: ضريح الشيخ الكامل
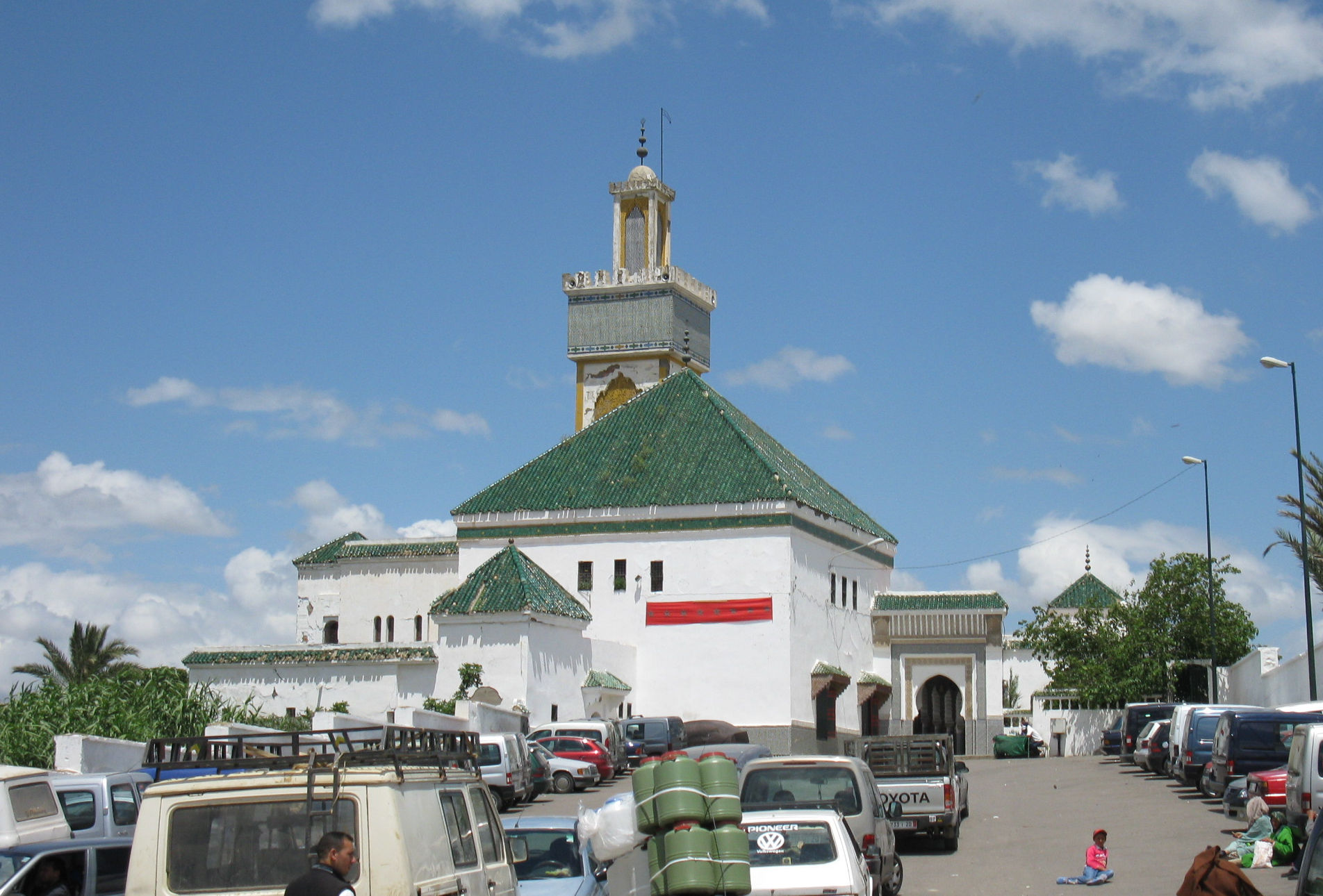

- Location in Morocco

Religion
- Affiliation: Islam
- District: Bab al-Jadid
- Region: Fès-Meknès
- Status: Active

Location
- Location: Meknes, Morocco
- Country: Morocco
- Interactive map of Cheikh Al Kamel Mausoleum
- Coordinates: 33.8987900°N 5.5705515°W

Architecture
- Type: mausoleum, zawiya and mosque
- Style: Moroccan
- Creator: Mohammed ben Abdallah
- Established: 16th century
- Completed: 1776

Specifications
- Minaret: 1
- Shrine: 1

The Shaykh al-Kamil Mausoleum (Arabic: ضريح الشيخ الكامل), romanized as Cheikh Al Kamel Mausoleum also known as the Mausoleum of al-Hadi ben Issa (ضريح الهادي بنعيسى) is a historic religious complex located in Meknes, Morocco.

It consists of a zawiya, mosque, and the mausoleum of Mohammed al-Hadi ben Issa the founder of the Isawiyya order of Sufism.

== History ==
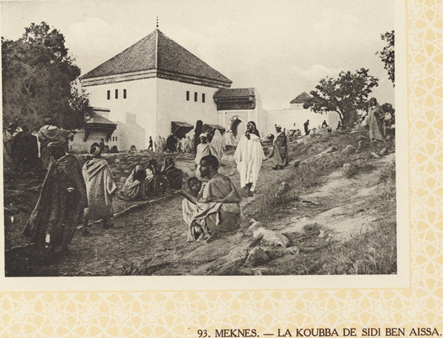
A 19th-century photograph of the mausoleum. Note the absence of a minaret

The mausoleum of Mohamed ben Issa, a prominent Ash'ari scholar and Sufi mystic, was established in the 16th century. Later in 1776, the Alaouite ruler, Mohammed Ben Abdallah, built a completely new structure around the saint's tomb. The minaret appears to have been a later addition. The complex is currently used as both a mosque and mausoleum.

== Usage ==
=== Mawlid Celebration ===
The celebration of Mawlid, which is the celebration of the birth of Muhammad, occurs at the mausoleum. This festival is different from other Mawlids, due to it being done in the unique Issawi style. Instruments like the ta'raj, the brass, the flutes, the drums, the trumpet, are played, before the participants enter a long session of dhikr and meditation. Traditionally, dates are a meal during this festive occasion.

=== Rituals ===
The rituals of the Issawi order are performed here. The mausoleum is also the focal point of an annual moussem (a type of Sufi religious festival). Unlike Mawlid, the festival here was brutal in nature, and it was historically known for its displays of self-mutilation. The religious rituals in the festival are intertwined with musical and joyful celebrations that are sometimes violent, including rolling around and drinking blood of animal sacrifices.

== Controversy ==
The mausoleum became known for its presence of homosexuals, and the government tried to suppress the rising of homosexual rituals within the building. These homosexuals claimed to have been the descendants of Aisha, another local patron saint of Meknes.

== Gallery ==
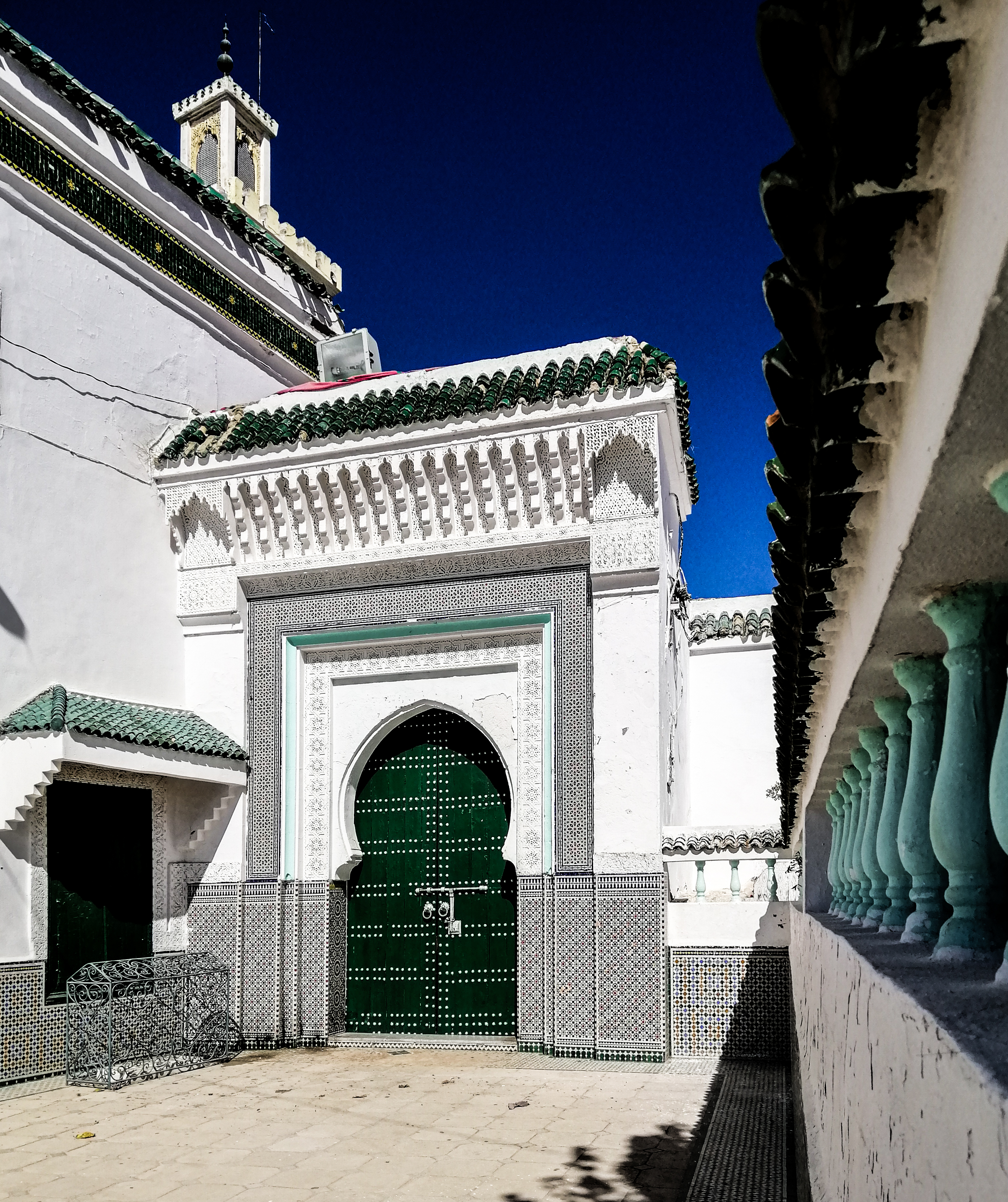
The entrance to the mausoleum

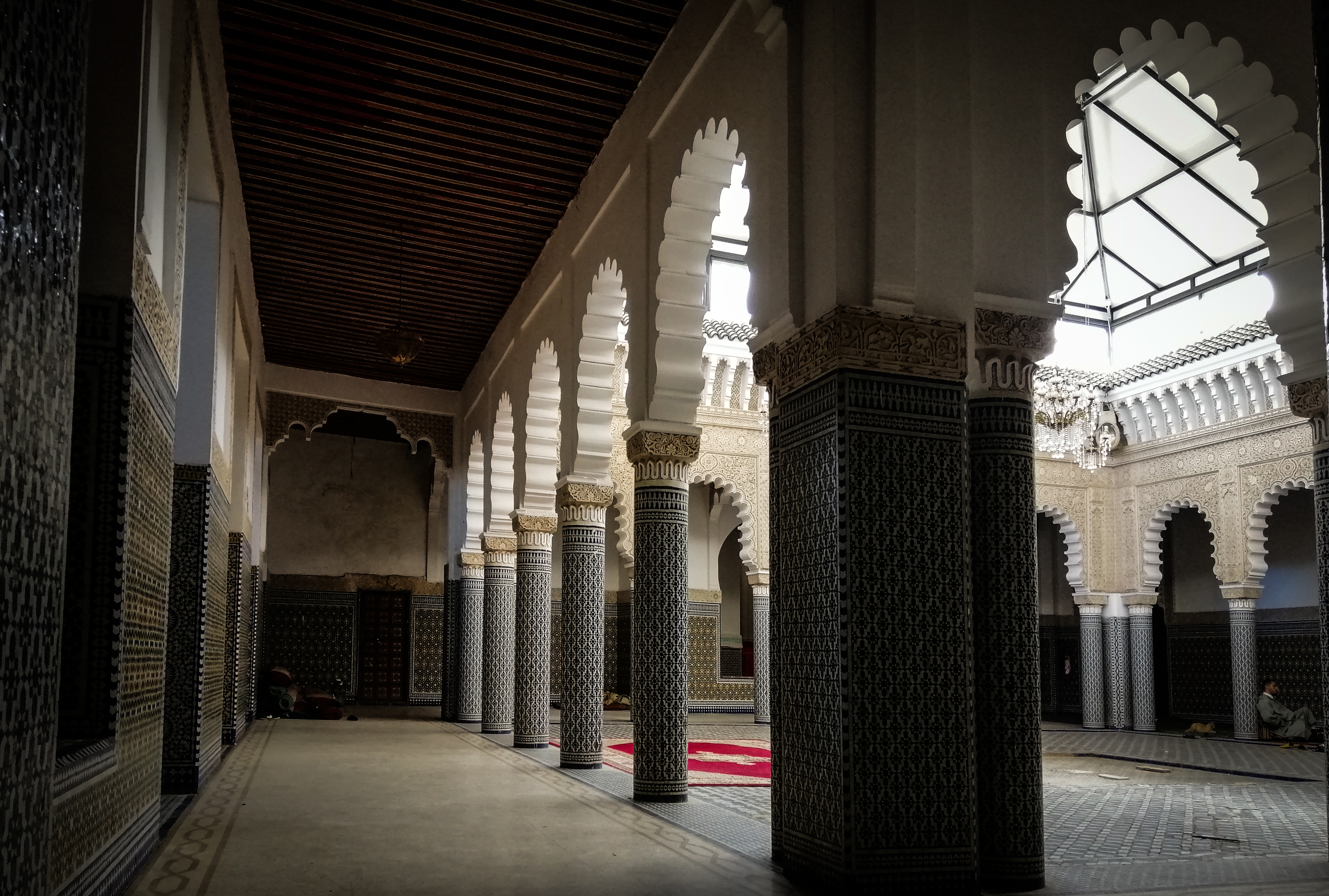
The courtyard of the building, covered by glass roof

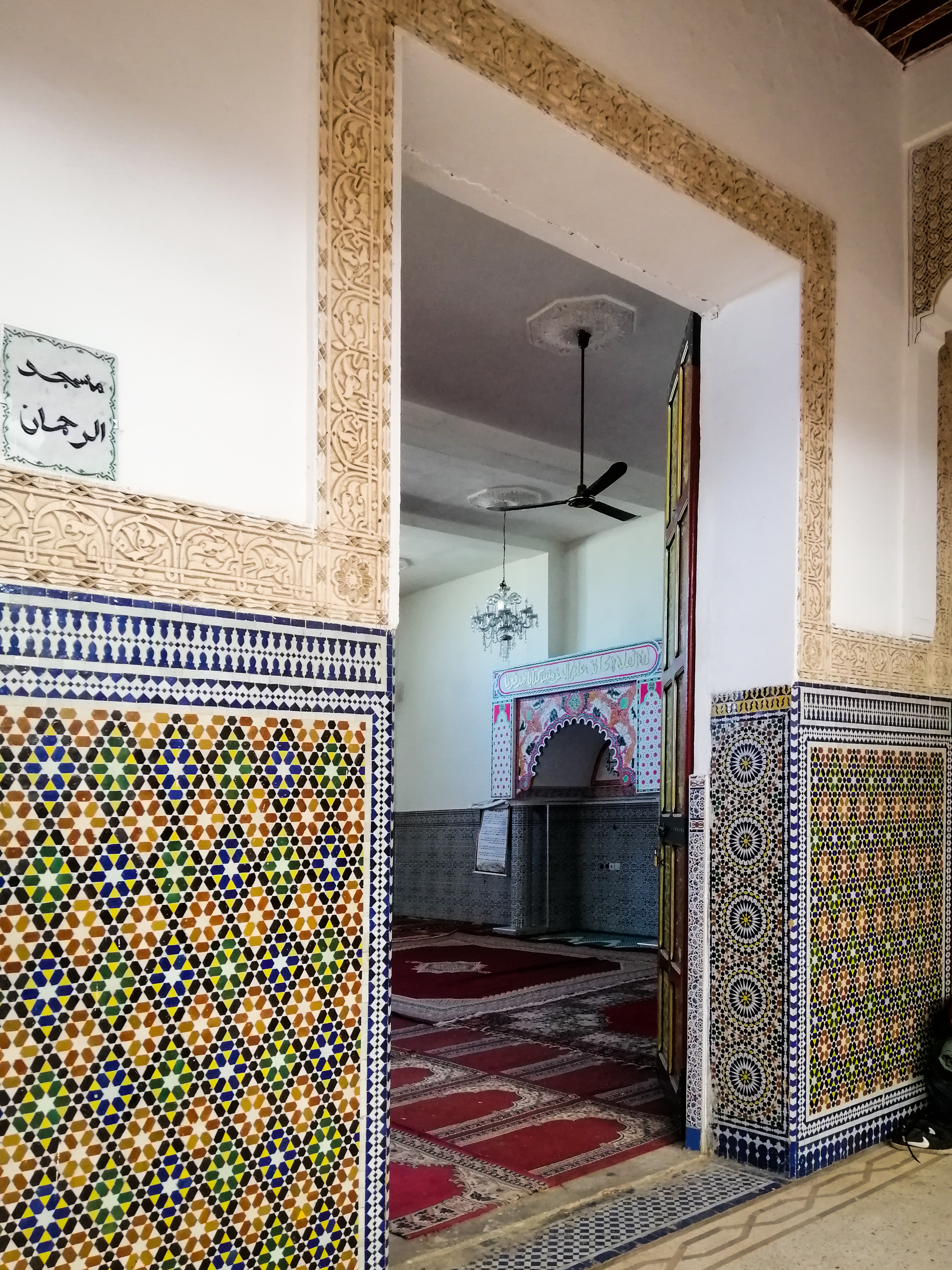
Doorway and entrance to the prayer hall

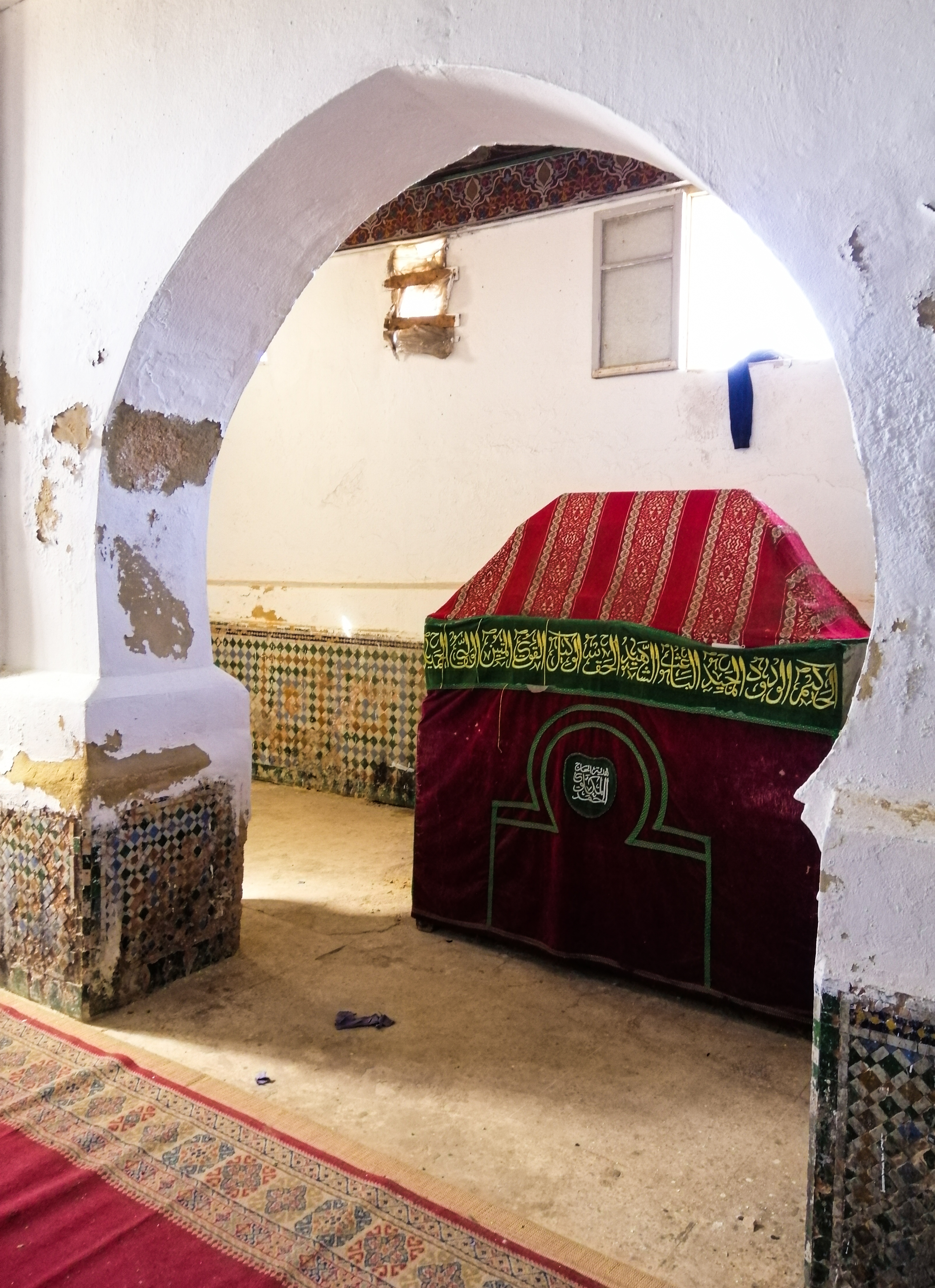
The tomb of one of Mohammed Al-Hadi ben Issa's descendants

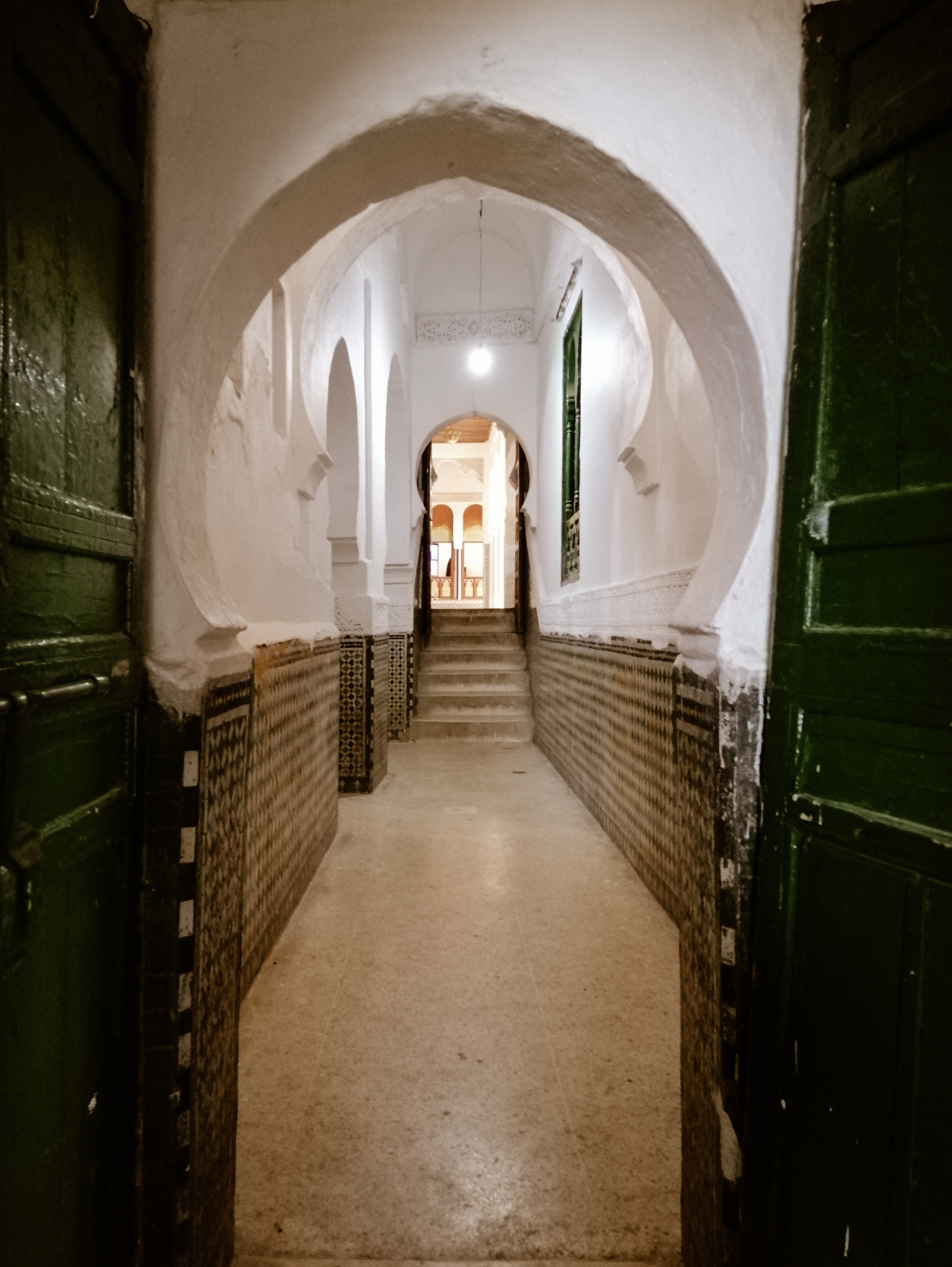
Hallway

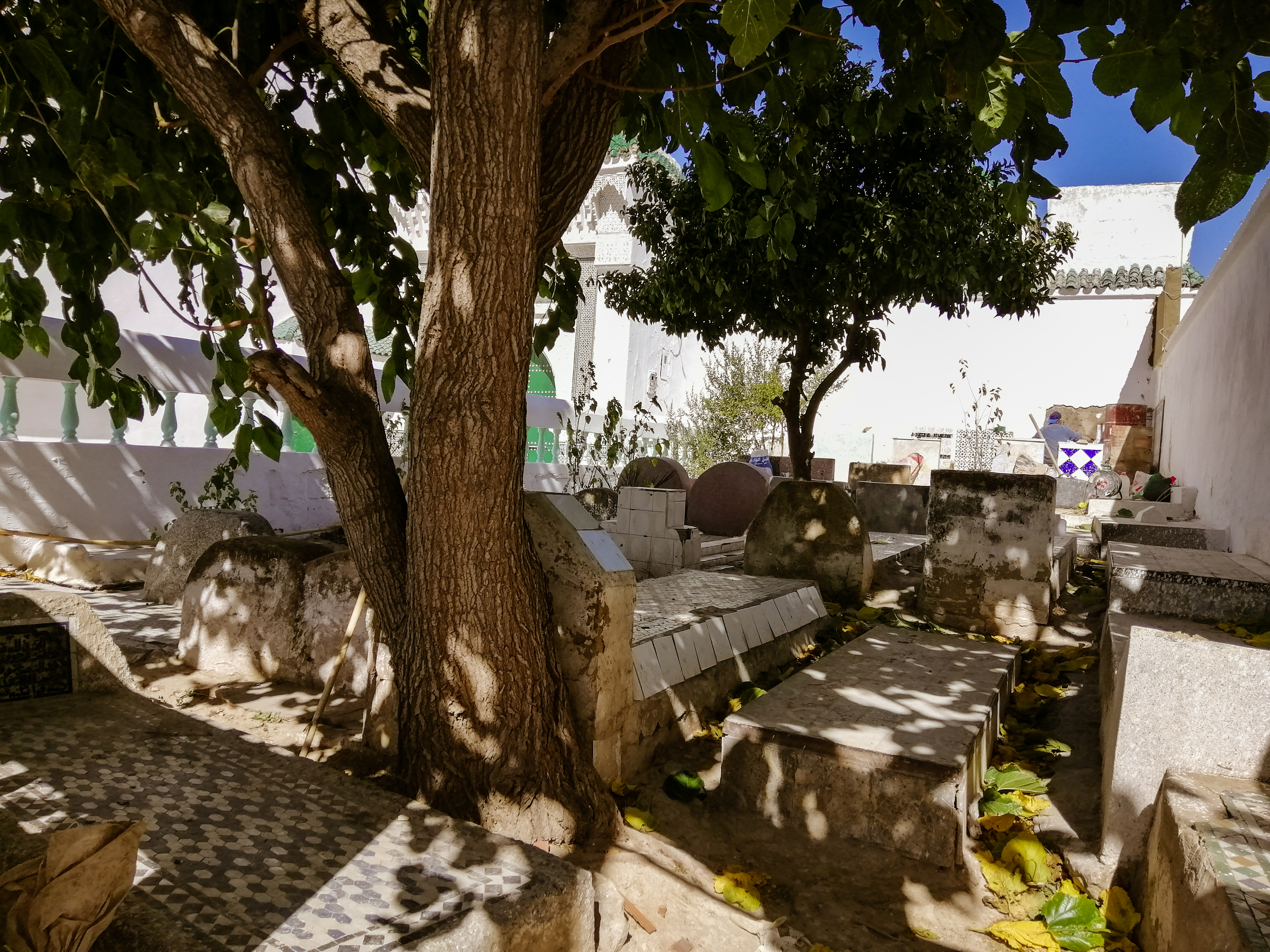
Several graves of commoners, behind the mausoleum

== See also ==
- Islam in Morocco
- List of mosques in Morocco
