= Mohamed ben Issa =

Mohamed ben Issa may refer to:

- Mohammed al-Hadi ben Issa (1467-1526), founder of the Isawiyya Sufi order
- Mohamed Benaissa (1937-), Minister of Foreign Affairs of Morocco from 1999 to 2007
