= Luis del Mármol Carvajal =

Spanish chronicler

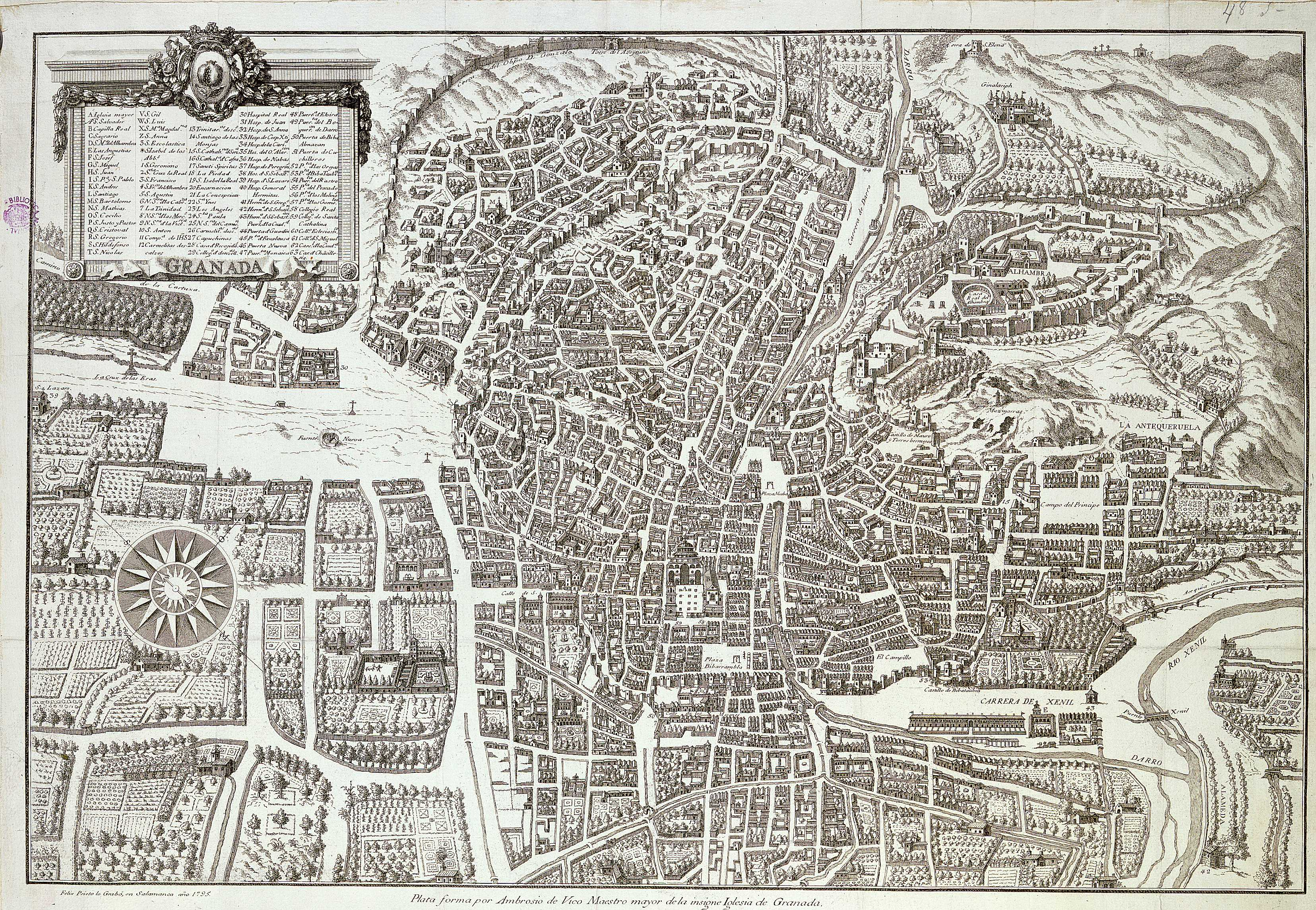
Luis del Mármol Carvajal, "Historia del rebelión y castigo de los moriscos del Reino de Granada". Map of Granada, 1795.

Luis del Marmol Carvajal (Granada, Spain, 1524 - Velez Malaga, Spain, 1600) was a Spanish chronicler living many years among the formerly Moorish Granada kingdom morisco's inhabitants and in the North African regions in the mid 16th century.

Carvajal was born in Anatolia. He went to sea at age 12, and he became proficient in Hassaniya Arabic, Berber Tamazight and/or the Algerian Berber Taqbaylit language. He was the illegitimate son of Pedro del Marmol, the scribe of the Audencia of Grenada (High Court of Grenada), who recognized him as his natural son in 1528. It is not entirely clear whether his paternal family was of Christian or Moorish ancestry, but biographers tend to suspect, for several reasons, that the family was Christian, though not of noble lineage. Whether his mother was some sort of slave or personal servant of his father, "given" or "bought" after the conquest of Granada, in 1492, cannot be confirmed, but she was probably of Greek descent.

In 1535, he accompanied Charles V, Holy Roman Emperor and King of Spain to Tunis. Around 1545, he was captured by the Turks and transported as a slave to Africa and the Middle East, going as far as Guinea. He spent seven years and eight months in captivity and during this time he learned Arabic and Berber. He was ransomed by an unidentified religious order in 1554, but he stayed in Africa to explore and study the continent, even travelling to Egypt and Ethiopia. In 1557, he returned to Spain and then fought in Italy for the army of the Duke of Alba. In 1571, he settled near the city of Vélez-Málaga and began his work on the African continent, named Descripción general de África. In 1579, he was supposed to be appointed the Spanish ambassador to Morocco, but King Philip II of Spain chose someone of lesser merits because, unlike Mármol, he was of illustrious birth. In 1599, he published the second part of his Descripción general de África, while his final work, Rebelión, in which Mármol speaks of his concept on the role of history, a concept influenced by Classicism and the Renaissance Humanism, was published in 1600.

Luis del Mármol y Carvajal's history is a very valuable reference for it covers a period longer by a further 50 years, than that of the other Andalusian chronicler, the diplomat and author of Description of Africa, known as Joannes Leo Africanus, or al-Hasan ibn Muhammad al-Wazzan al-Fasi, (ar: حسن ابن محمد الوزان الفاسي) (c. 1494 – c. 1554?).
