= Amal Bourquia =

Moroccan nephrologist, university professor, author, and expert in ethics

Amal Bourquia is a Moroccan doctor, university professor, medical writer, and expert in ethics. She is the author of more than a dozen works on nephrology. She is the first woman to have the title of professor of nephrology in Morocco, and was the first president of the Moroccan Society of Renal Diseases.

== Early life and education ==
Amal Bourquia was born in Casablanca. She studied at the Faculty of Medicine and Pharmacy of Rabat, then at that of Faculty of Medicine and Pharmacy of Casablanca. In 1980, she passed the CHU Casablanca competitive exam and became an internal medicine doctor, specializing in pediatric nephrology, and obtaining a professor's diploma in her specialty from Paris Descartes University.

== Career and research ==
She contributes to the development of numerous therapeutic programs, particularly against acute and chronic hemodialysis and peritoneal dialysis. She participated in the first kidney transplant operation carried out by a Moroccan medical team in 1990, the year in which she was appointed associate professor of nephrology at the Faculty of Medicine and Pharmacy of Casablanca. She is the first woman to have the title of professor of nephrology in Morocco.

In 1996, she worked to open the first public dialysis center in Morocco and Africa. However, this center closed shortly after its inauguration due to administrative procedures.

That same year, 1996, she left the civil service and opened her own dialysis center in Casablanca. Considering that the State alone cannot resolve the health, financial, and social complications and problems posed by kidney diseases, especially chronic ones, for both patients and their families, Bourquia undertakes awareness-raising actions and leads conferences. In 1999, she participated in the organization of the first national nephrology congress, which brought together all the country's specialists and experts in nephrology. She initiated World Kidney Day in Morocco, and established Kidney Week.

In 2004, she founded the Reins Association, the Moroccan kidney disease organization, which in addition to supporting and caring for disadvantaged patients, promotes organ donation and transplantation in Morocco. The same year, she co-authored Guide africain de néphrologie pédiatrique (the African Guide to Pediatric Nephrology), which became a reference in the treatment of kidney diseases in children in Africa. Since 2005, and thanks to an agreement with the Mohammed V Foundation for Solidarity, she has organized medical caravans for screening and care in isolated areas of the country. She followed the training of trainers in health ethics, human rights and morality, provided by the Pierre and Marie Curie University, and became a member of the UNESCO global ethics observatory. She chairs the French-speaking network of pediatric nephrology, is a member of the World Medical Association, and is a representative of Africa within the international association of nephrology pediatricians. Bourquia is a member of the Moroccan Society of Renal Diseases, of which she was the first president. She represented Morocco on the board of directors of the French Society of Nephrology. She is also a speaker and consultant in ethics and bioethics.

== Awards and honours ==
Challenge magazine selected Bourquia in 2022 among the "50 inspiring women who are shaking things up".

== Selected works ==
- 99 réponses à la maladie rénale [99 Answers to Kidney Disease]. ISBN 978-9954-9062-2-4. OCLC 929598001.
- La dialyse et la greffe rénale: Étude de pharmaco-économie [Dialysis and kidney transplantation: A study of pharmacoeconomics.]. Maroc: Éditions Espace santé. 1995.
- Faire face à l'insuffisance rénale chronique [Coping with chronic renal failure]. Maroc. 1995.
- La dialyse au Maroc: Réalités et perspectives [Dialysis in Morocco: Realities and perspectives]. Éditions Consulting. 1997. ISBN 9981-894-11-7. OCLC 41232539.
- Plaidoyer pour la transplantation rénale au Maroc [Advocacy for kidney transplantation in Morocco]. Maroc: Éditions Espace santé. 2004.
- La vie après la perte des reins [Life after kidney loss]. Maroc. 2006.
- Regard éthique: Greffe rénale au Maroc [Ethical perspective: Kidney transplantation in Morocco]. Maroc. 2017.
- Le don et la transplantation d'organes [Organ donation and transplantation]. Maroc. 2022. ISBN 978-9954-9062-8-6.
