= Mohammed al-Mahdi al-Fasi =

Mohammed al-Mahdi al-Fasi (Arabic: محمد المهدي الفاسي) also known as Abu Isa Abu Abdallah Mohammed al-Mahdi ibn Ahmad ibn Ali ibn Yusuf al-Fihri al-Fasi was a well-known mystic, biographer and historian from Fes. A member of the prominent al-Fasi family. He was born in Ksar al-Kebir on May 17, 1624 and died 20 February 1698. He was buried in the mausoleum of his great grandfather Abu l-Mahasin Yusuf al-Fasi.

He was the author of the following works on mysticism:

- Three commentaries on the Dala'il al-Khayrat
- Mumti al-asma fi dhikr al-Jazuli wa at-Tabba'a wa ma lahuma min al-atba (on Muhammad al-Jazuli and Abdelaziz al-Tebaa)
- Al-Ilma bi-bad man lam yudkar fi-Mumti al-asma

Al-Mahdi wrote the following biographical works, on his great grandfather Abu l-Mahasin Yusuf al-Fasi:

- Al-Gawahir as-Safiyya min al-Mahasin al-Yusufiyya
- Rawdat al-mahasin az-zahiyya bi-maatir as-Sayh Abi-l-Mahsin al-Bahiyya

On the traditions of the people of Fes he wrote:

- Al-Arf al-asi fi-l-urf al-Fasi
