= Fadma Abi =

Moroccan surgeon and professor (died 2020)

- fair use image
- Died: 2 October 2020
- Education: University of Montpellier; University of Paris; Faculty of Medicine and Pharmacy of Rabat
- Occupations: surgeon, lecturer
- Known for: Morocco's first female surgeon

Fadma Abi (died 2 October 2020) was a Moroccan surgeon and professor. She was regarded as the first Moroccan woman to practice surgery which was traditionally dominated by men in Morocco.

== Biography ==
Fadma was originally from a small town in Khenifra in Central Morocco. She lived in Midelt for a while before moving to Meknes in order to pursue her primary education in Lalla Amina.

== Career ==
Fadma moved to France to complete her higher studies soon after completing her tertiary education in Morocco. In July 1981, she obtained a diploma in General Anatomy and Organogenesis from the University of Montpellier. She also obtained a diploma and specialised in the field of general surgery.

In 1982, she achieved the rare achievement by becoming the first ever female surgeon in Morocco when she was honoured as Morocco's first woman surgeon by the late Majesty Hassan II in a ceremonial event. She also successfully finished her first open heart surgery in the same year after becoming a professional surgeon. In June 1989, she obtained certificate of studies in ultrasound from the University of Paris. She began her teaching career as a university professor at the Faculty of Medicine and Pharmacy of Rabat in 1992.

She also started delivering lectures at several universities, press conferences around the world including the Middle Eastern Endoscopic Surgery Association in 2019. She especially served as the chairperson of the Mediterranean and Middle Eastern Endoscopic Surgery Association in 2019. In 2018, she also served as the President of the 22nd Maghrebian Congress of the Moroccan Association of Surgery.

She was also well known in Morocco for empowering and training younger people (especially women) in surgery.

== Death ==
Abi battled cancer during her later years. She died on 2 October 2020, from complications of COVID-19.
