= El Fassi =

El Fassi is a surname. Notable people with the surname include:

- Abbas El Fassi (born 1940), a Moroccan politician and businessman, the prime minister of Morocco.
- Nadir El Fassi (born 1983), a French decathlete.
- Farah El Fassi (born 1988), a Moroccan actress.
- Mohamed El Fassi (1908–1991), a Moroccan politician, writer and researcher.

== See also ==
- Al-Fasi
- Fassi
