= Dala'il al-Khayrat =

Collection of Islamic prayers

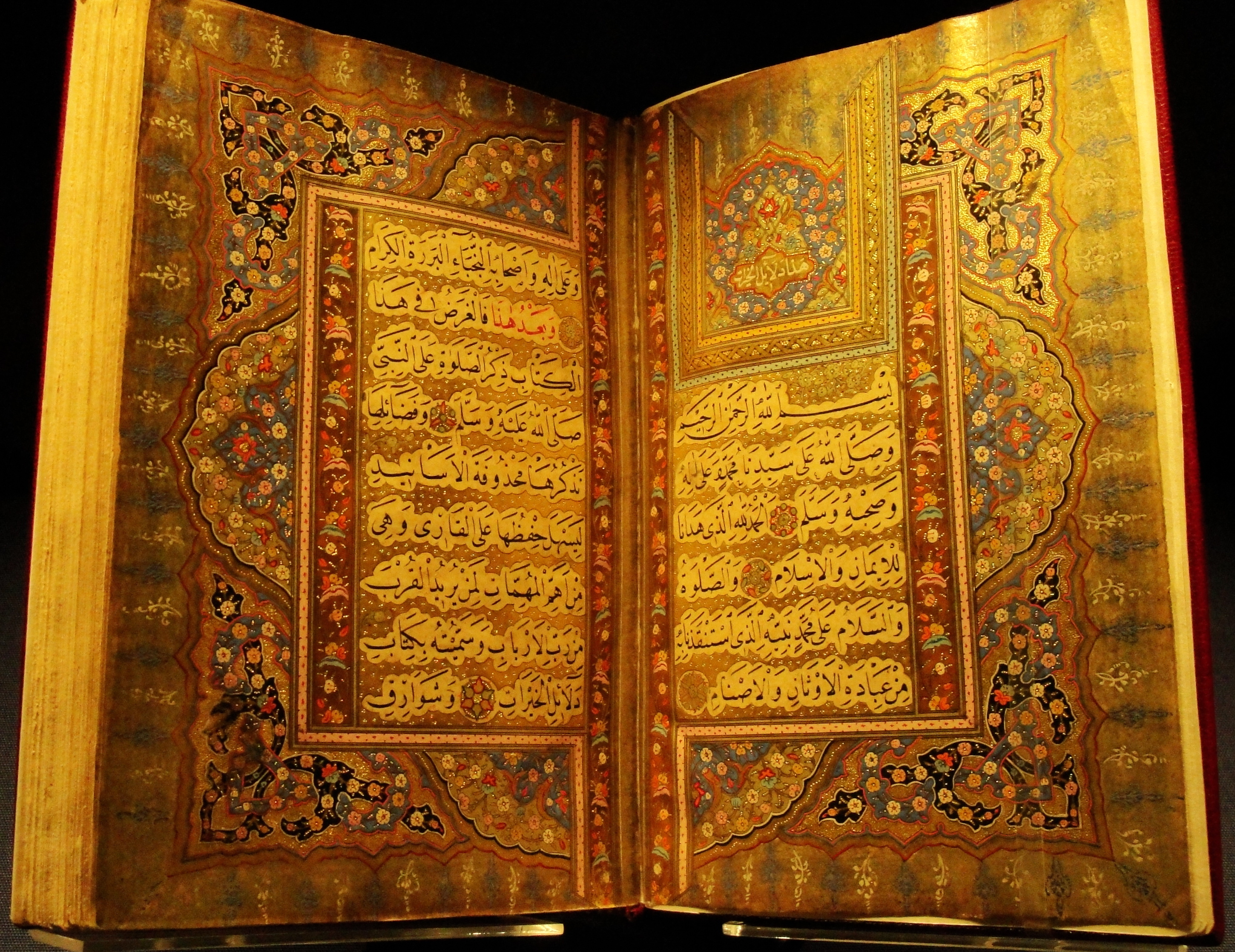
A 15th-century copy of Dala'il al-Khayrat from the Chester Beatty Library.

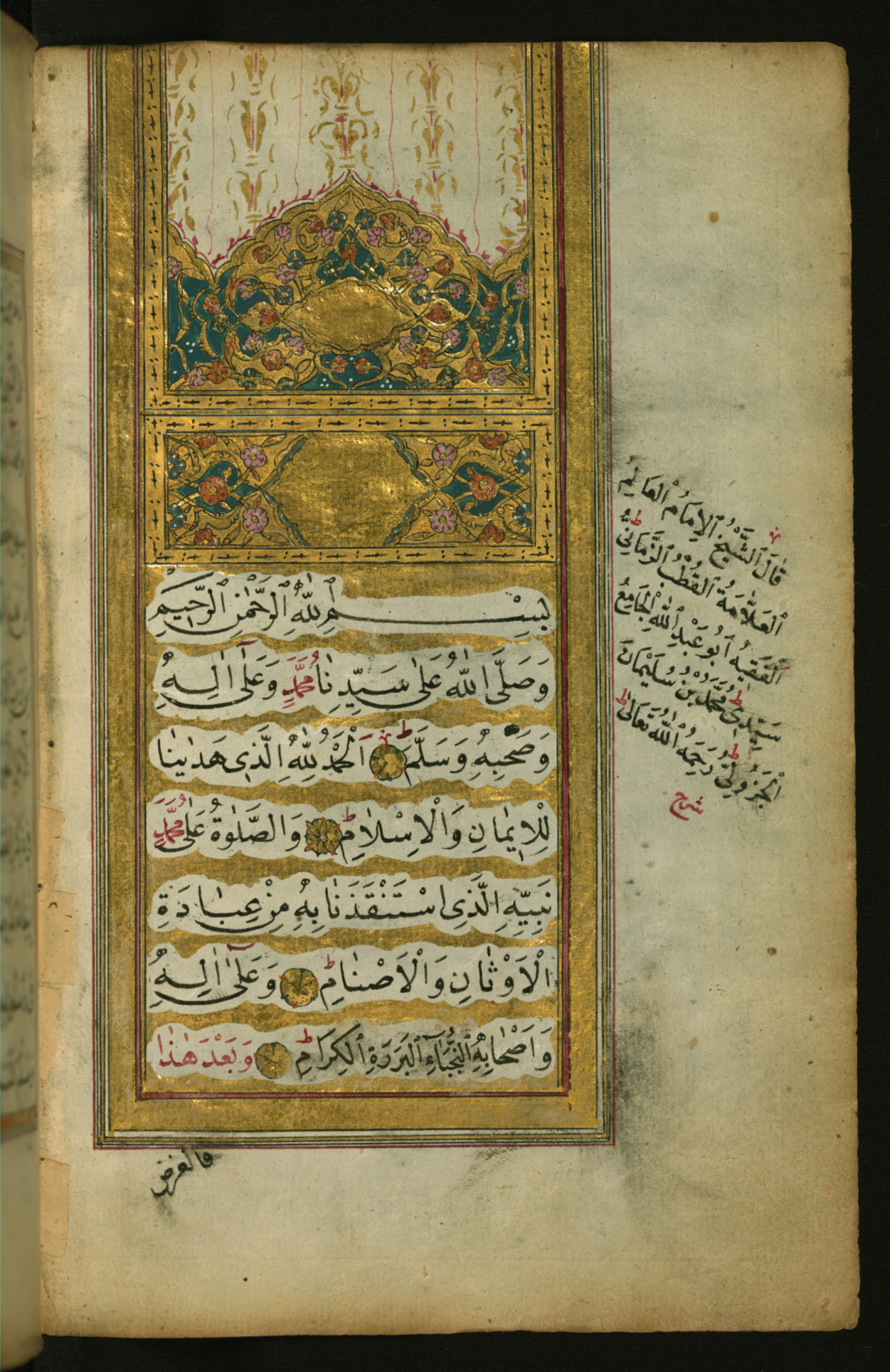
The opening page from a 17th-century copy of Dala'il al-Khayrat from the Walters Art Museum.

Dalāʼil al-khayrāt wa-shawāriq al-anwār fī dhikr al-ṣalāt ʻalá al-Nabī al-mukhtār (Arabic: دلائل الخيرات وشوارق الأنوار في ذكر الصلاة على النبي المختار, lit. 'Waymarks of Benefits and the Brilliant Burst of Lights in the Remembrance of Blessings on the Chosen Prophet'), usually shortened to Dala'il al-Khayrat, is a famous collection of prayers for the Islamic prophet Muhammad, which was written by the Moroccan Shadhili scholar Muhammad al-Jazuli (died 1465 AD). It is popular in parts of the Islamic world amongst traditional Muslims—specifically North Africa, the Levant, Turkey, the Caucasus and South Asia—and is divided into sections for daily recitation.

== Background ==
Moroccan hadith scholar Abdullah al-Talidi wrote of the Dala'il al-Khayrat: "Millions of Muslims from East to West tried it and found its good, its blessing, and its benefit for centuries and over generations, and witnessed its unbelievable spiritual blessings and light. Muslims avidly recited it, alone and in groups, in homes and mosques, utterly spending themselves in the Blessings on the Most Beloved and praising him".

The Dala'il al-Khayrat is the first major book in Islamic history which compiled litanies of peace and blessings upon Muhammad. It is also the most popular and most universally acclaimed collection of litanies asking God to bless him. Among some Sunni religious orders, most notably the Shadhili order, its recitation is a daily practice. In others however, its recitation is a purely voluntary daily practice. The work begins with the ninety nine names of God, and then a collection of 201 names of Muhammad.

The legend behind the origin of the Dala'il al-Khayrat claims that al-Jazuli once awoke late for his morning prayers and began to look in vain for pure water to perform ritual ablutions. In the midst of his search al-Jazuli encountered a young girl who was aware of al-Jazuli's famed religiosity and was bewildered on why al-Jazuli could not find pure water. The girl then spat into a well which miraculously overflowed with pure sweet water for al-Jazuli to perform ablutions. Consequent to performing prayer, al-Jazuli inquired to the means by which the girl achieved such a high spiritual station. The girl replied it was simply by "Making constant prayer for God to bless the best of creation by the number of breaths and heartbeats." Al-Jazuli then resolved to write a work collecting litanies of prayers asking God to bless and show mercy and kindness to Muhammad.

Al-Jazuli then moved east to Medina where he would recite the whole of the Dala'il al-Khayrat twice daily at Muhammad's grave in al-Masjid an-Nabawi. The Dala'il Khayrat has since been seen as a testament of love and passionate longing for Muhammad.

Many of exegesis were written on the Dala'il Khayrat - most notably by the scholar Yusuf an-Nabhani in his work Afdal al-Salawat, Mohammed al-Mahdi al-Fasi's Matali‘ Al Masarrat Bi Jalaa’ Dala’il Al Khayrat (مطالع المسرات بجلاء دلائل الخيرات) and Abd al-Majid al-Sharnubi al-Azhari's Sharh Dala'il Khayrat. A classic Ottoman era work by Kara Davud is popular in Turkish, titled Tevfîk-i Muvaffık il-Hayrât li-Neyl'il-berekât fî Hidmet-i Menbâ'üs-sa'adât (Ottoman Turkish: توفیق موفق الحیرات لنیل البركات فی خدمة منباع السعادات), in short known as "Kara Davud". In 2023, Shaykh Muhammad al-Yaqoubi undertook the task of publishing the most authentic edition and English translation of the Dala'il al-Khayrat, following extensive research into its chains of transmission and the consultation of numerous manuscripts, through his London-based publishing house, Signatora.

== Manuscripts ==
Institution	Inventory number	Origin	Date	Size	Notes
Walters Art Museum	W.583	Ottoman Empire	17th century		
National Library of Israel	Yahuda Ms.Ar.862	North Africa	17th century		
Khalili Collection of Hajj and the Arts of Pilgrimage	MSS 97	Turkey	late 17th or 18th century	52 folios	
National Library of Israel	Yahuda Ms.Ar.864	Ottoman Empire	1734		
Chester Beatty Library, Dublin	CBL Ar 5459	Probably Morocco	18th century		
Los Angeles County Museum of Art	M.85.237.51	Turkey	1751-1752		
National Library of Israel	Yahuda Ms.Ar.863	India	Late 18th century		
National Library of Israel	Yahuda Ms.Ar.47	Ottoman Empire	1795		
Khalili Collection of Hajj and the Arts of Pilgrimage	MSS 1278	India	late 18th – early 19th century	2 detached pages	
Museum of Islamic Art, Qatar	MS.427.2007	Istanbul	19th century		
Khalili Collection of Hajj and the Arts of Pilgrimage	MSS 1283	India, or possibly Mecca by Indian artists	1801-2	101 folios	
National Library of Israel	Yahuda Ms.Ar.852	Kashmir	Early 19th century		
Bayerische Staatsbibliothek, Munich	BSB Cod.arab. 2646		1830	99 folios	
Khalili Collection of Hajj and the Arts of Pilgrimage	MSS 1138	Morocco	1838	223 folios	
Bayerische Staatsbibliothek, Munich	BSB Cod.turc. 553	Istanbul	1845	221 folios	
Khalili Collection of Hajj and the Arts of Pilgrimage	MSS 276	Turkey, probably Istanbul	1848-9	84 folios	
Bayerische Staatsbibliothek, Munich	BSB Cod.arab. 2673	Istanbul?	1857	90 folios	
National Library of Israel	Yahuda Ms.Ar.38	Ottoman Empire	1862		
Khalili Collection of Hajj and the Arts of Pilgrimage	MSS 1245	North Africa or Mecca	1873	89 folios	
Allama Iqbal Library, University of Kashmir		Saudi Arabia	1885	187 folios	
Weltmuseum Wien, Vienna Austria	140430	Afghanistan	18th century, acquired Ludwig Gustav Alois Zöhrer before 1960		

== Gallery ==
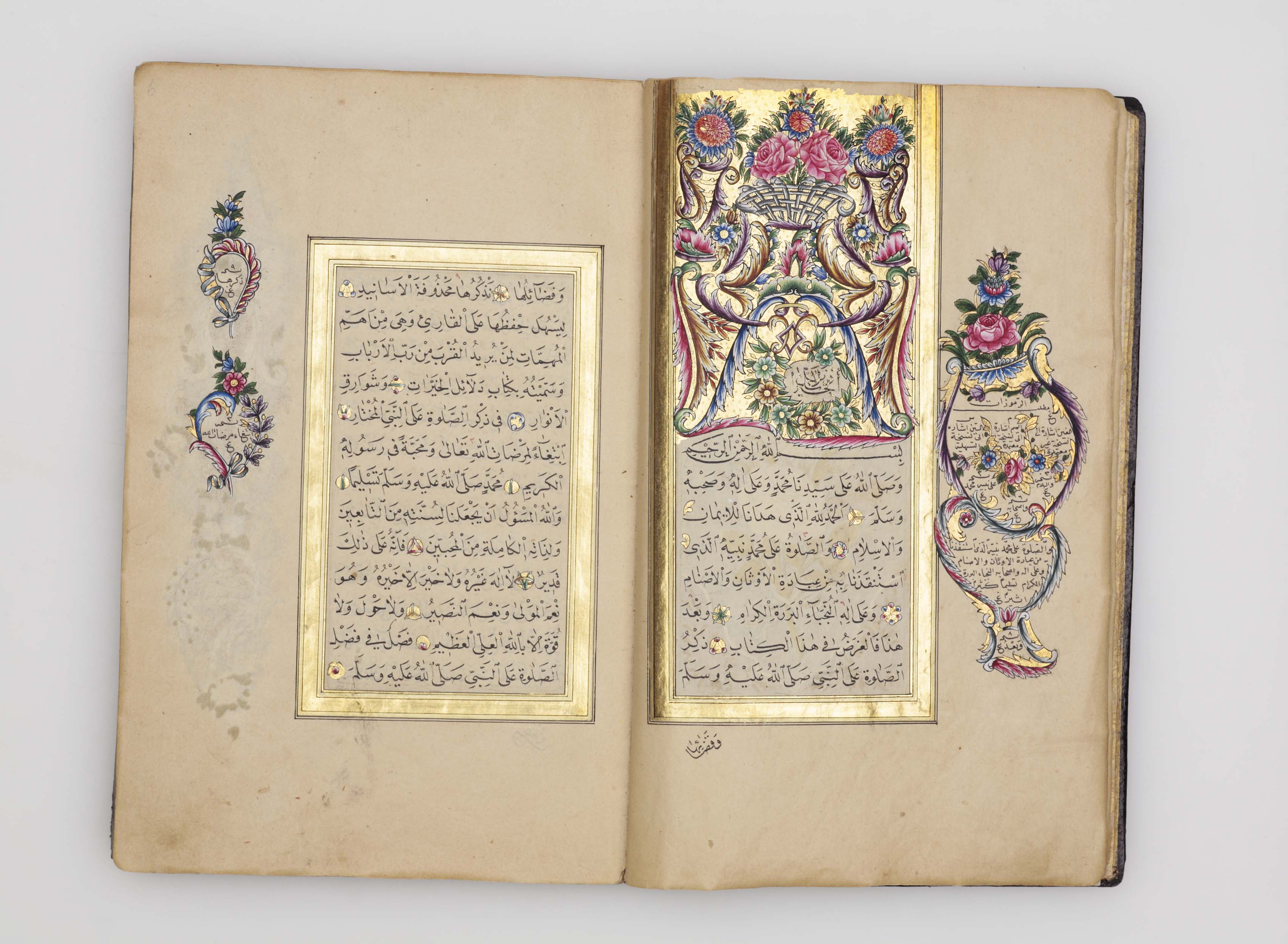
Khalili Collections MSS 0276

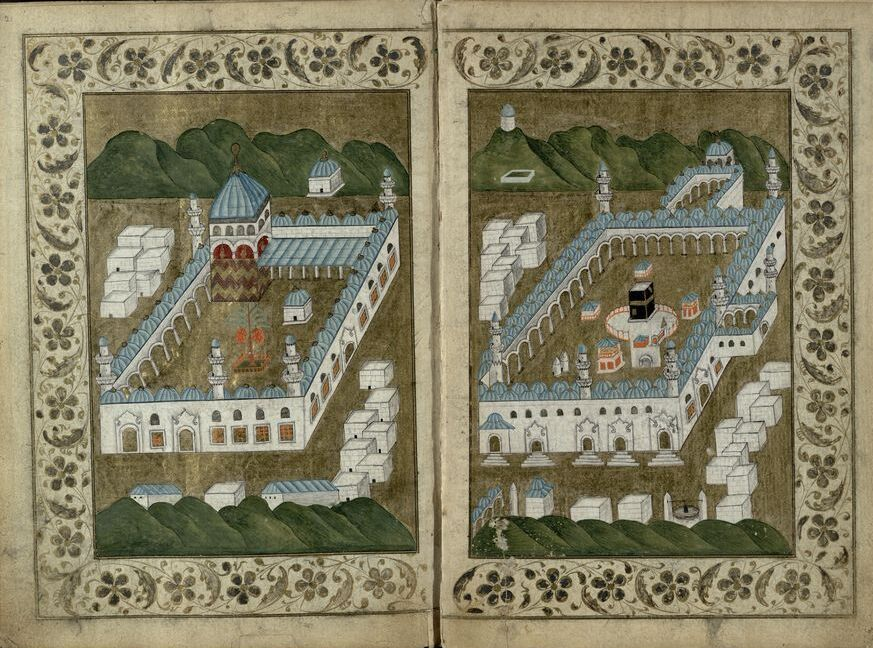
The National Library of Israel Jerusalem Israel Ms. Yah. Ar. 47 showing illustrations of the Great Mosque of Mecca and the Prophet's Mosque.

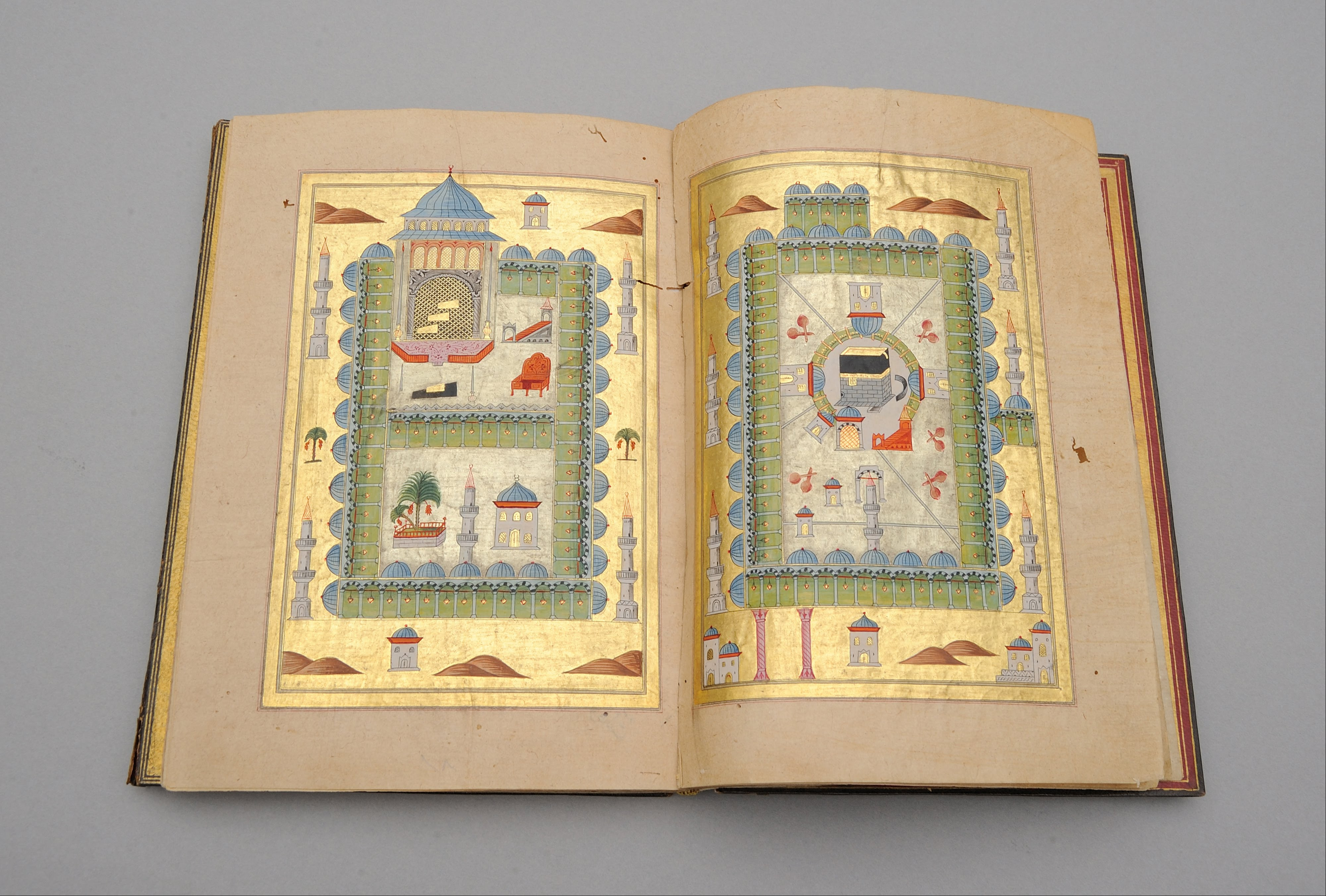
The Museum of Islamic Art, Qatar, MS.427.2007 showing illustrations of the Great Mosque of Mecca and the Prophet's Mosque.

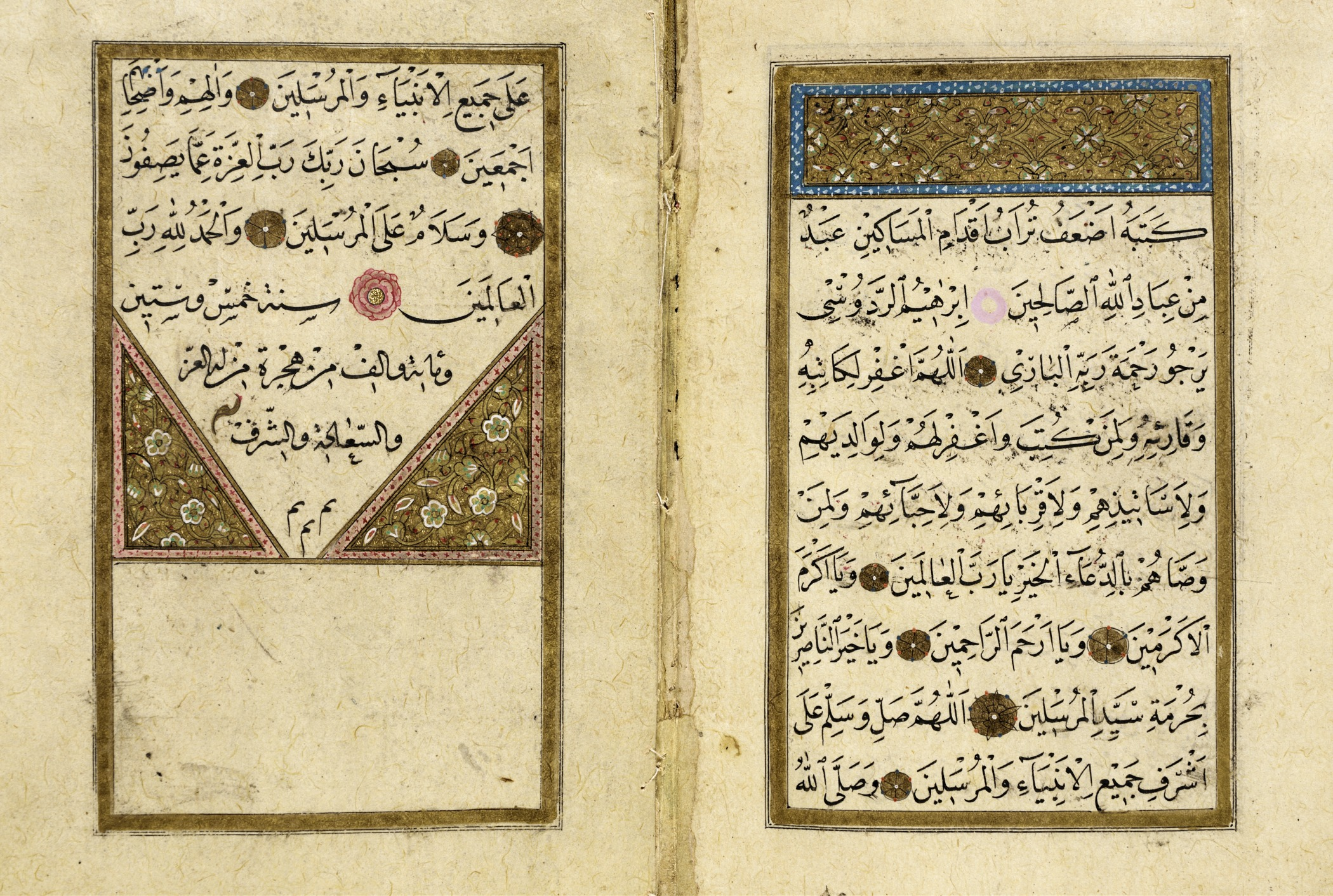
Los Angeles County Museum of Art M.85.237.51

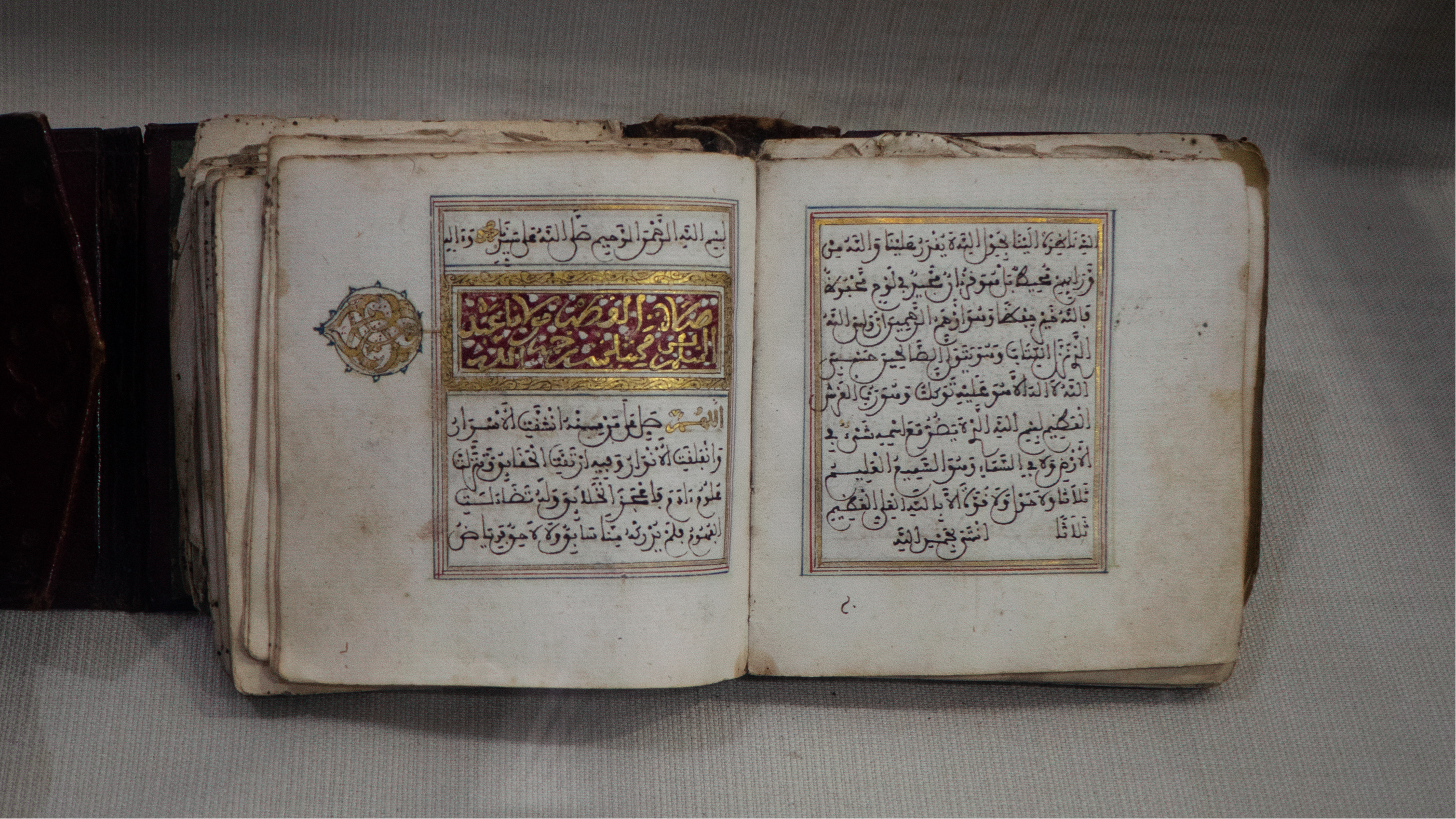
Manuscript dating back to the Ottoman period, National Museum of Antiquities and Islamic Art, Algiers, Algeria.
