= Abd al-Qadir al-Fasi =

Moroccan scholar

- Title: Shaykh al-Jama'a (Master of the Community)

Personal life
- Born: Abd al-Qadir ibn Ali ibn Yusuf al-Fasi c. 1599 Ksar el-Kebir, Morocco
- Died: 1680 Fes, Morocco
- Resting place: Zawiya of Sidi Abdelkader al-Fassi, Fes
- Parent: Ali ibn Yusuf al-Fasi (father)
- Notable work: Tuhfat al-Kebir (biography written by his son Abd al-Rahman al-Fasi)
- Known for: Founder of the Shadhili zawiyya of Ksar-el-Kebir, Prominent Sufi scholar
- Occupation: Scholar, Sufi leader
- Relatives: Abu l-Mahasin Yusuf al-Fasi (grandfather)

Abd al-Qadir ibn Ali ibn Yusuf al-Fasi or Sidi Abdelkader el-Fassi (Arabic: عبد القادر بن علي بن يوسف الفاسي; c. 1599–1680) or, in full, Abu Mohammed, Abu Sa'ud Abd al-Qadir al-Fasi ibn Abu al-Hasan Ali ibn Abu al-Mahasin Yusuf al-Qasri al-Fasi was the founder of the Shadhili zawiyya of Ksar-el-Kebir. His biography, Tuhfat al-Kebir, was written by his son Abd al-Rahman al-Fasi. He was one of the most prominent members of the al-Fasi family.

Abd al-Qadir was a grandson of Abu l-Mahasin Yusuf al-Fasi (d. 1604), the founder of the first Zawiya al-Fassiya in Fes. He was born in Ksar el-Kebir, and moved to Fes to study under Abd al-Rahman al-'Arif al-Fassi (his grand-uncle, not to be confused with his son). After the latter died, he took over the second branch of the Zawiya al-Fassiya located in the Qalqliyin neighbourhood while becoming a disciple of Muhammad al-Ma'an. Abdelkader's learning and influence grew, however, and he came to be regarded as a reformer and reviver of Sufism in Fes during a troubled period for the city in the early reign of Moulay Ismail (ruled 1672–1727). He was a complex figure who, in addition to promoting Sufism, devoted himself also to the study of hadiths and became acknowledged as a master scholar of conventional Islamic sciences too, earning him the title of Shaykh al-Jama'a ("Master of the Community"). He is the author of a fahrasa. This genre, in which a scholar enumerates his shaykhs and the works he read with them, can be read as a scholarly curriculum vitae.

His teachings included a critical perspective on the political elites of his time (who nonetheless admired him) and an emphasis on intellectual or scholarly Sufism which was inherited by the generations of Sufis in Fes after him. Particularly towards the end of his life, he acquired the reputation of a saint who accomplishes miracles. Abd al-Qadir died in 1680 and was buried in a tomb in his zawiya in the Qalqliyin area, which has since been known as the Zawiya of Sidi Abdelkader al-Fassi. (The older "Zawiya al-Fassi" founded by Abu al-Mahasin, located in the Mukhfiya neighbourhood, remained known as the Zawiya of Abu al-Mahasin al-Fassi.)
