= Kara Davud =

Muhammad Kara Davud bin Kamal al-Izmiti (b. ?; Izmit – d. 948 AH/1541 CE; Bursa) was an Ottoman scholar of Islam known for his work on the exegesis of the Dala'il al-Khayrat: Tevfîk-i Muvaffık il-Hayrât li-Neyl'il-berekât fî Hidmet-i Menbâ'üs-sa'adât (Ottoman Turkish: توفیق موفق الحیرات لنیل البركات فی خدمة منباع السعادات), widely known as "Kara Davud".

== Works ==
- Talkhis-e Takrir-e Qawanin
- Sharh-e Kasida-e Nuniya
- Malumat (A work on aqida and kalam. The original copy is in the Manasdır Library)
- Mikdar-ul Qamus
- Risalat Isa-Gujy
