= Mohammed al-Arbi al-Fasi =

Moroccan author (1580–1642)

Personal life
- Born: Abu Abd Allah Hamid Mohammed ibn Yusuf al-Arbi al-Fasi; 1580 Fes, Morocco
- Died: 1642 (aged 61–62)
- Parent: Abu al-Mahasin Yusuf al-Fasi (father)
- Notable work: Mir'at al-Mahâsin min akhbar al-shaykh Abi al-Mahasin
- Known for: Author of several books, including "Mir'at al-Mahâsin min akhbar al-shaykh Abi al-Mahasin"
- Occupation: Scholar, Author

Abu Abd Allah Hamid Mohammed ibn Yusuf al-Arbi al-Fasi (Arabic: محمد العربي الفاسي) (1580–1642), born to the al-Fasi family in Fas in Morocco, is the author of several books among which Mir'at al-Mahâsin min akhbar al-shaykh Abi al-Mahasin (The Mirror of exemplary qualities), written in 1636, is the best known. It is about his father Abu l-Mahasin Yusuf al-Fasi and the beginnings of his family.
