= Zawiya of Sidi Abdelkader al-Fassi =

Religious site in Fez, Morocco

Zawiya of Abd al-Qadir al-Fassi
- زاوية عبد القادر الفاس
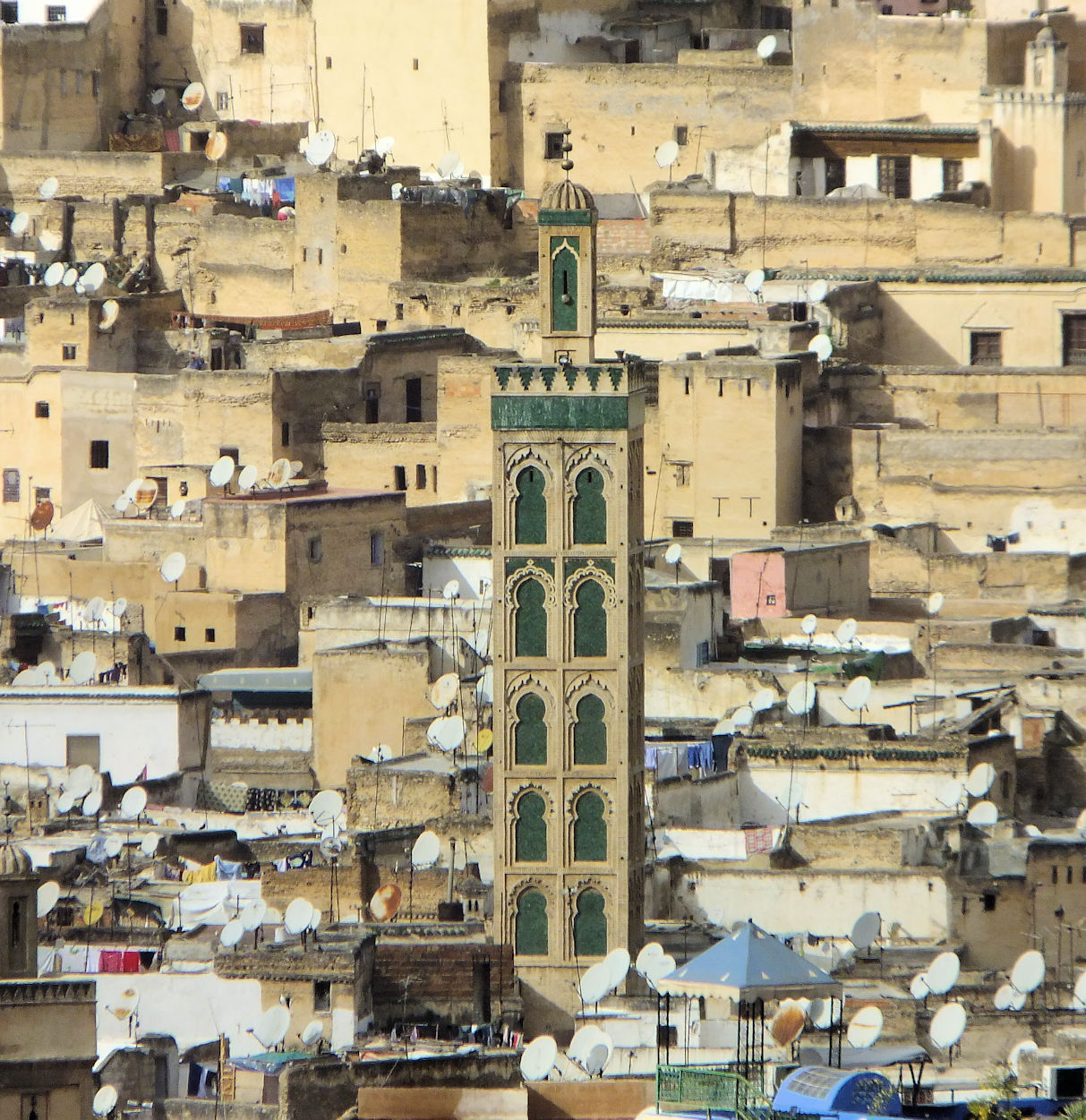
- The minaret of the zawiya, prominently visible on the southern skyline of the city

Religion
- Affiliation: Islam

Location
- Location: Fes el-Bali, Fez, Morocco
- Interactive map of Zawiya of Abd al-Qadir al-Fassi
- Coordinates: 34°03′38.1″N 4°58′24.8″W

Architecture
- Type: zawiya, mosque, mausoleum
- Style: Alaouite, Moroccan, Islamic
- Established: 17th century
- Minaret: 1

The Zawiya of Sidi Abdelkader al-Fassi, also known as the Zawiya al-Fassiya, is one of the most important historical zawiyas (religious complex and Sufi sanctuary) in Fes, Morocco. It is named after Sidi Abdelkader al-Fassi (also spelled Abd al-Qadir al-Fassi), a highly important 17th-century Muslim scholar, mufti, and Sufi saint of the city who is buried in the zawiya. The building is located in the Qalqliyin neighbourhood in the south of Fes el-Bali, the old medina of Fes. It was one of several zawiya sites in the city and across the country which were associated with the al-Fassiya tradition of Sufism.

== History ==
The first "Zawiya al-Fassiya" was first established by Abdelkader's ancestor, Abu al-Mahasin (died in 1604), a Muslim scholar from Ksar el-Kebir and from a bourgeois family of Andalusi origin. Before coming to Fes, Abu al-Mahasin won some favour with the Saadian sultan Ahmad al-Mansur thanks to the warriors he sent to fight in the Battle of Ksar el-Kebir (also known as the Battle of the Three Kings) in 1578. He moved to Fes in 1580 and started a zawiya by teaching in his own house in the al-Mukhfiya neighbourhood (in the Andalusiyyin quarter of the city), which quickly developed into an important center of scholarship on its own. Abu al-Mahasin purchased neighbouring houses to accommodate its expansion and in 1596 converted one of the houses into a mosque for his zawiya, designating his son Abu al-Abbas Ahmad al-Hafiz as imam. The zawiya's teachings followed al-Jazuli's school of thought (itself within the Shadhili order) and those of Abd al-Rahman al-Majdub (died 1569), an earlier Sufi sheikh who spent time in Fes and who was Abu al-Mahasin's teacher.

Abu al-Mahasin's younger brother, Abd al-Rahman al-'Arif al-Fassi (died 1626), became his spiritual successor. He established a second zawiya in the Qalqliyin neighbourhood in the Qarawiyyin quarter of Fes. This second site was devoted to initiating new disciples and to more esoteric practices like the sama', while the original site in the Andalusiyyin quarter became associated with more public and institutional aspects of their order. During the 17th century the Zawiya al-Fasiyya dominated the spiritual life of Fes and took on added sociopolitical importance. Some of the other disciples of Abu al-Mahasin also founded new branches of the zawiya across Morocco, the most important of which was in Ksar el-Kebir. One of them, Muhammad al-Ma'an, established his own zawiya in the al-Mokhfiya neighbourhood, the Zawiya al-Ma‘aniyya.

Abdelkader al-Fasi (full name: Abu Mohammed, Abu Sa'ud Abd al-Qadir al-Fasi ibn Abu al-Hasan Ali ibn Abu al-Mahasin Yusuf al-Qasri al-Fasi) was Abu al-Mahasin's grandson and was born in Ksar el-Kebir, before moving to Fes to study under Abd al-Rahman al-'Arif al-Fassi (his grand-uncle). After the latter died, he took over the Zawiya al-Fassiya in the Qalqliyin neighbourhood while becoming a disciple of Muhammad al-Ma'an. Abdelkader's learning and influence grew, however, and he came to be regarded as a reformer and reviver of Sufism in Fes during a troubled period for the city in the early reign of Moulay Ismail (late 17th century). He was a complex figure who, in addition to promoting Sufism, devoted himself also to the study of hadiths and became acknowledged as a master scholar of conventional Islamic sciences too, earning him the title of Shaykh al-Jama'a ("Master of the Community"). His teachings included a critical perspective on the political elites of his time (who nonetheless admired him) and an emphasis on intellectual or scholarly Sufism which was passed down to the generations after him. Particularly towards the end of his life, he acquired the reputation of a saint who accomplished miracles.

Abdelkader died in 1680 and was buried in a tomb in his zawiya in the Qalqliyin area, which has since been known as the Zawiya of Sidi Abdelkader al-Fassi. (The older "Zawiya al-Fassi", in the Mukhfiya neighbourhood, remained known as the Zawiya of Abu al-Mahasin al-Fassi, after its original founder.) The zawiya building was expanded by Sultan Moulay Isma'il who ruled between 1672 and 1727 and was also responsible for expanding the Zawiya of Moulay Idris II in Fes. The zawiya was held in such high regard that, like the more famous Zawiya of Moulay Idris II, it became a sanctuary (horm or hurm) where Muslims were able to claim legal asylum from authorities. It maintained good relations with the makhzen (royal government) and with the common people, allowing it to sometimes play a mediator role between political forces in the city. The al-Fassi family itself also continued to be a prominent family in Morocco, yielding important figures such as the 20th-century religious scholar and nationalist leader Allal al-Fassi.

== See also ==
- Zawiya of Sidi Ahmed al-Tijani
- Zawiya of Sidi Taoudi Ben Souda
