= Faculty of Medicine and Pharmacy of Rabat =

- Type: Public
- Established: 1962
- Founders: Hassan II
- Affiliations: Mohammed V University at Souissi
- Dean: Mohamed Adnaoui (since 2013)
- Location: Rabat, Morocco
- Campus: Al Irfane
- Website: medramo.ac.ma

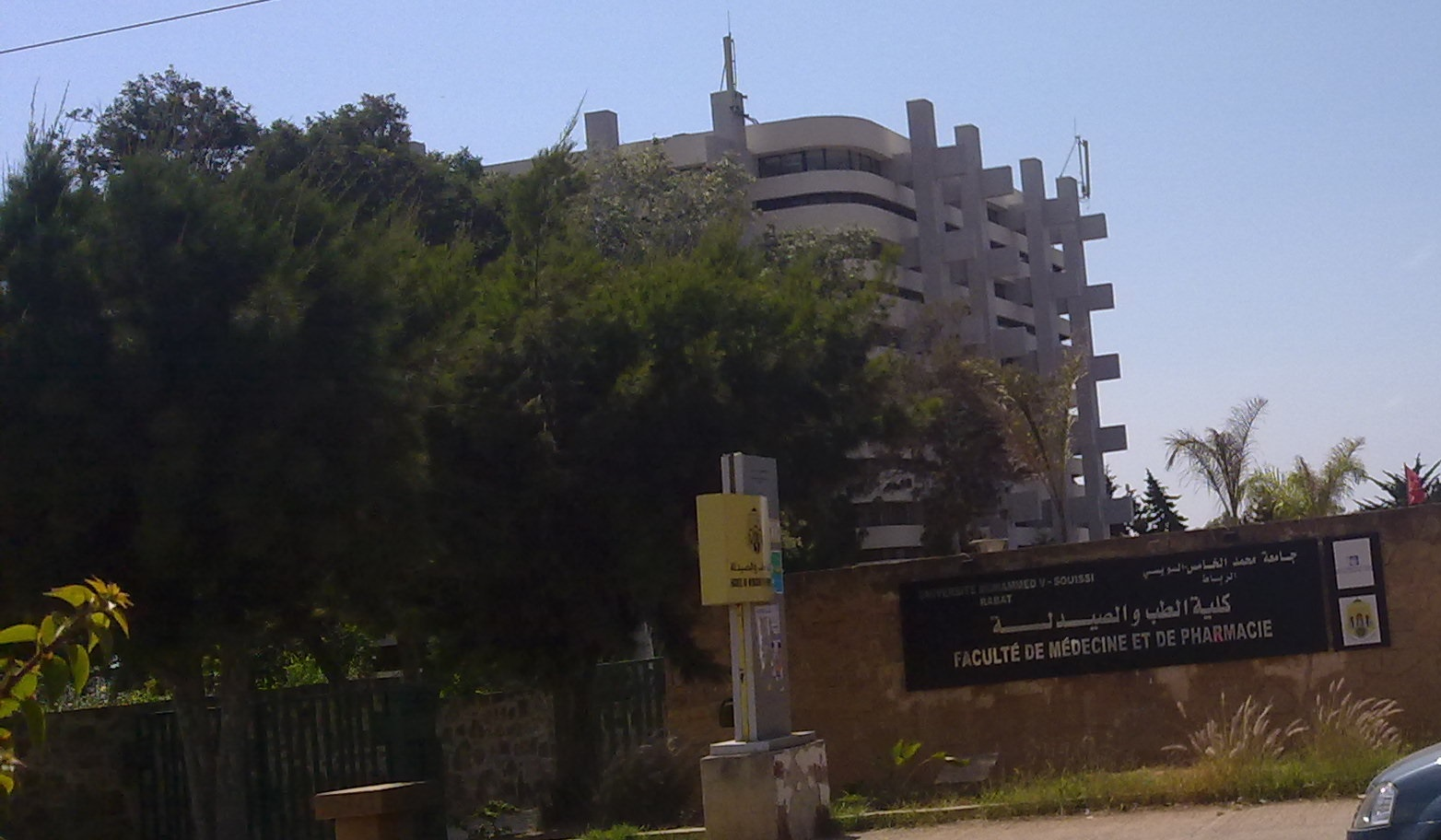
Faculty of Medicine and Pharmacy of Rabat

The Faculty of Medicine and Pharmacy of Rabat (also known as FMP-Rabat) is a Moroccan public higher education in Medicine and Pharmacy established in 1962. It is affiliated with the University Mohammed V - Souissi Rabat.

== History ==
The FMP-Rabat was established by Moroccan Dahir 1.58.390. The faculty was officially opened by Hassan II of Morocco on 16 October 1962 and opened in November of the academic year 1962–1963. On 16 October 1986, the "Pharmacy" section was born. The residency was established in March 1996. In 2013 the faculty has celebrated its 50th anniversary, it has formed more than 13,000 doctors and nearly 2,000 pharmacists.

== Buildings ==
The FMPR has 7 amphitheatres with a capacity of 2800, 03 meeting rooms with a capacity of 216, 12 Classrooms and tutorials with a capacity 678,29 practical works rooms with a capacity of 1245.

It has also 17 clinical laboratories and preclinical basic sciences, 109 hospital services distributed by specialty in all hospital units depending on the Ibn Sina University Hospital of Rabat-Salé.

== Deans of faculty ==
- Pr Abdelmalek Faraj: 1962–1969
- Pr Abdellatif Berbich: 1969–1974
- Pr Bachir Lazrak: 1974–1981
- Pr Taieb Chkili: 1981–1989
- Pr Mohamed Tahar Alaoui: 1989–1997
- Pr Abdelmajid Belmahi: 1997–2003
- Pr Najia Hajjaj-Hassouni: 2003–2013
- Pr Mohamed Adnaoui: 2013–2023
- Pr Lekehal Brahim : 2023-Current

== Notable alumni ==
- Amal Bourquia
