= Farida Fassi =

Moroccan professor of physics

Farida Fassi FAAS
- فريدة الفاسي
- Born: Larache, Morocco
- Education: University of Valencia; Abdelmalek Essaâdi University
- Occupations: Researcher; Scientist
- Scientific career
- Fields: Theoretical particle physics Experimental particle physics
- Workplaces: CERN; Mohammed V University

Farida Fassi FAAS (Arabic: فريدة الفاسي) is a Moroccan professor of physics at Mohammed V University in Rabat. She is the co-founder of the African Strategy for Fundamental Applied Physics and a member of African Academy of Sciences.

== Life and education ==
Fassi was born in Larache where she attended middle and high school before moving to Tetouan to complete her university studies. She obtained her Bachelor of Science in Physics from Abdelmalek Essaâd University in 1996. After that, she moved to Spain, the University of Valencia, where she obtain her Master of Science in 1999. In 2003, she was awarded a Doctor of Philosophy in particle physics due to her work on the ATLAS experiment at CERN.

== Career and research ==
Until 2003, Fassi was part of the ATLAS and Compact Muon Solenoid (CMS) combined experiment team which later discovered the Higgs boson in 2012. After that, she worked in Grid Computing and Distributed Data Analysis. In 2007, Fassi was elected for a fellowship at CERN. Also, for thirteen years, she has been working in different post-doctoral and Research positions such as the Spanish National Research Council, the French National Centre for Scientific Research, and the Spanish Center for Particle, Astroparticle, and Nuclear Physics. She is a professor of physics at Mohammed V University in Rabat.

Fassi was also featured in the list of top 50 scientists worldwide according to the international 2021 AD Scientific Index. She has been cited more than 250,000 times and has a h-index of 219. (Note: These citations to publications of huge collaborative projects include up to 3000 scientists, e.g., Observation of a new particle in the search for the Standard Model Higgs boson with the ATLAS detector at the LHC) She was ranked thirty eight in the world and second in the African continent and Middle east. Fassi is the founding secretary general of Arab physical Society, and the co-founder of the African Strategy for Fundamental and Applied Physics.

== Awards and honours ==
Fassi was elected a Fellows of the African Academy of Sciences in 2020.

== Selected publications ==
- CERN ATLAS (17 September 2012). Observation of a new particle in the search for the Standard Model Higgs boson with the ATLAS detector at the LHC, Physics Letters B, 716:1, 1–29
- Farida Fassi, " African Strategy for Fundamental and Applied Physics (ASFAP)", The African Physics Newsletter – 8 April 2021.
- Miquel Senar, P. Lason, Farida Fassi: Organization of the International Testbed of the CrossGrid Project.

== See also ==
- ATLAS experiment
- Abdellatif Berbich
