= Isawiyya order =

Moroccan Sufi mystic order in Islam

'Isawiyya Sufi order
Founder
- Mohammed al-Hadi ben Issa

Aissawa music in a wedding in Salé - Morocco - November 2025

Aissawa performance in Meknes during Ramadan 2023

The Isawiyya order (Arabic: الطريقة العيساوية, romanized: al-Ṭarīqa al-ʿĪsāwiyyah) also known as Aissawa, Issawa, Aissaoua, Issaoua (Arabic: عيساوة, romanized: ʿĪsāwā) is a Sufi religious order or tariqa founded in Meknes, Morocco, by Sheikh al-Kamil Mohamed al-Hadi ben Issa (or Aissa) (1465–1526).

It is known for its spiritual performances, which generally comprise group recitation of religious psalms, accompanied by the use of the oboe ghaita (similar to the mizmar or zurna) and polyrhythmic percussion.

Ceremonies, including symbolic dances to bring the participants to ecstatic trance, are held by the Aissawa in private during domestic ritual nights (lîla-s), and in public during celebrations of cultural festivals and pilgrimages, called moussem-s. Other occasions are religious festivities, such as the Eid holidays or mawlid, celebration of the birth of the Islamic prophet Muhammad.

== Founding by Muhammad Ben Issa ==
Some details regarding Ben Issa remain unknown. He has a hagiography that projects the image of a Sufi master and legendary ascetic of considerable spiritual influence.

Ben Issa built his own mausoleum in the monastery or Zaouia in the city of Meknes. This is now a destination for his modern followers to visit and pray while participating in individual or collective acts of piety.

Ben Issa was initiated into Sufism by three masters of the tariqa Shadhiliyya/Jazuliyya: Abu al-Abbas Ahmad Al-Hariti (Meknes), Abdelaziz al-Tebaa (Marrakesh) and Muhammad as-Saghir as-Sahli (Fès).

The terms Aissawiyya (`Isawiyya) and Aissawa (`Isawa), derives from the name of the founder.

== Spiritual doctrine ==
The spiritual doctrine of the Issawa follows the earlier mystical tradition of the tariqa Shadhiliyya/Jazuliyya. This religious teaching first appeared in 15th century Marrakesh and is the most orthodox mystical method to appear in Morocco

Issawa disciples are taught to follow the instruction of their founder by adhering to Sunni Islam and practising additional psalms including the long prayer known as "Glory to the Eternal" (Al-hizb Subhan Al-Da `im).

The original Issawa doctrine makes no mention of ecstatic or ritual exercises such as music and dance.

== The spiritual centre in Meknes ==
The Zaouia or centre in Meknes is the main spiritual centre of the Issawa brotherhood. Founded by Muhammad Ben Issa at the end of the 15th century, construction resumed three centuries later under sultan Mohammed ben Abdallah. Often renovated by the Ministry of Habous and Islamic Affairs and maintained by the municipal services, this is the center of the brotherhood's international network. The site is open to the public all year round and is the location of the tombs of founder Shaykh al-Kamil, his disciple Abu ar-Rawayil, and the alleged son of the founder, Issa Al-Mehdi.

== International growth ==
Issawa's international growth began in the 18th century. From Morocco it has spawned organizations in Algeria, Tunisia, Libya, Egypt, Syria and Iraq. Outside these countries, there is Issawiyya practice without immediate access to Issawa institutions, as in France, Belgium, Italy, Spain, the Netherlands, the US and Canada. There is a building movement in the United States, focused primarily in Chicago.

== Current situation ==
Theoretically, the brotherhood's network is led from the mother-monastery in Meknes by direct biological descendants of Muhammad Ben Issa. The leader is currently Sidi Allal al-Issawi, a teacher and member of the League of Oulemas of Morocco and Senegal, as well as a poet and historian. In Morocco, the brotherhood – the musicians together with their rituals and music – currently enjoy a particular vogue. The basic cell of the religious order in Morocco is the team (ta `ifa), which takes the form of a traditional musical orchestra with twenty to fifty disciples.

Since a decision taken in the 17th century by the mother-monastery, groups of musicians are placed under the authority of a delegate (muqaddem). There are currently orchestras of the brotherhood across Morocco, but they are especially numerous in the towns of Meknes Fes and Sale, under the authority of the master Haj Azedine Bettahi, who is a well-known Sufi musician.

As leader of the muqaddem-s, Haj Azedine Bettahi has under his authority the following individuals:

- Haj Mohamed Ben Bouhama
- Haj Muhammad 'Azzam
- Haj Said El Guissy
- Haj Said Berrada
- Abdeljelil Al Aouam
- 'Abdelatif Razini
- 'Adnan Chouni
- 'Omar 'Alawi
- 'Abou Lhaz Muhammad
- 'Abdallah Yaqoubi
- Muhammad Ben Hammou
- Haj Hussein Lbaghmi
- Idriss Boumaza
- Haj 'Abdelhak Khaldun
- Muhammad Ben Chabou
- Mohcine Arafa Bricha
- Moustafa Barakat
- Nabil Ben Slimane
- Hassan Amrani
- Youssef 'Alami
- Youssef Semlali
- 'Abdellah al-Mrabet
- Benaissa Ghouali
- Nadjib Mekdia
- Lounis Ghazali
- Essaid Haddadou
- Mustapha Ben Ouahchia
- Cheikhuna Hakim Meftah Al Bedri
- Abdelillah Berrahma

All Issawa groups lead ceremonies that mix mystical invocation with exorcisms and trance-inducing group dances.

== The Issawa trance ritual: origins and symbolism ==
In Morocco, the ceremonies of the Issawa brotherhood take the form of domestic nightly rituals (known as "night", lila), organized mainly by Imam Shaykh Boulila (Master of the night), at the request of female believers.

As the Aissawa are supposed to bring to people blessings ("barakah"), reasons for organizing a ceremony are varied and include celebration of a Muslim festivity, wedding, birth, circumcision, or exorcism, the search for a cure for illness or to make contact with the divine through the extase. Rituals have standardized phases among all the Aissawa orchestras. These include mystical recitations of Sufi litanies and the singing of spiritual poems along with exorcisms, and collective dances.

Ludic aspects of the ceremony are attested to by the participants' laughter, songs, and dances, alongside ecstatic emotional demonstrations, which may feature crying and tears. At the symbolic system level, the ceremony represents the initiatory advance of the Sufi on an ascending mystical voyage towards God and the Prophet, then the final return to Earth. This odyssey passes through the world of human beings and that of the jinn to culminate in the higher spheres, where the human meets the divine.

According to Aissawa lore, this ceremony was not established nor even practised at the time of Chaykh Al-Kamil. Some members of the brotherhood believe that it emerged in the 17th century at the instigation of Aissawî disciple Sîdî `Abderrahman Tarî Chentrî. Alternatively, it may have appeared in the 18th century under the influence of Moroccan Sufi masters Sîdî `Ali Ben Hamdûch or Sîdî Al-Darqawî, who were both well known for their ecstatic practices.

More broadly, the actual trance ritual of the Aissawa brotherhood seems to have been established progressively through the centuries under the three influences of Sufism, pre-Islamic animist beliefs and urban Arab melodic poetry such as the Malhun.

Aissawa Moroccans generally avoid deep intellectual and philosophical speculations about Sufism, preferring to attach greater importance to the technical and aesthetic aspects of their music, litanies, poetry and ritual dances. They like to consider their ceremonial space as a safe haven for various artistic elements, for their symbolic system, as well as for the religious traditions of Moroccan culture.

== Professionalization of Aissawa musicians ==
Issawa ceremony
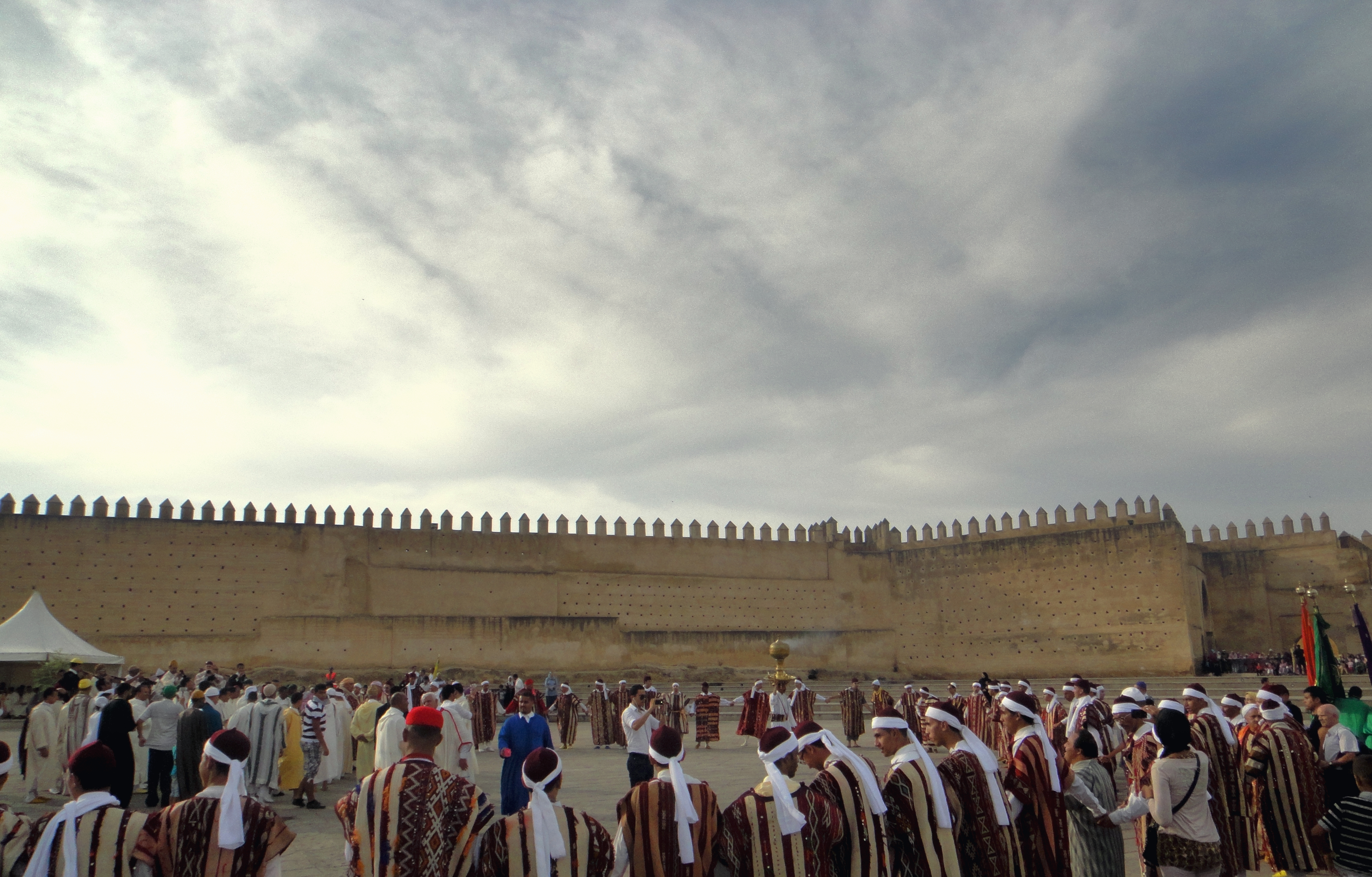

Background information
- Genre: Issawa Moussem at Moulay Idriss Zerhoun
- Website: confrerieaissawa.free.fr

The early 1990s saw the professionalization of ritual music, which affected both the musicians and their market. This change was possible because the authorities looked on moonlighting and the underground economy favorably. In this context, the Aissawa orchestras exhibit trends that are otherwise difficult to spot in the Moroccan economy. The brotherhood orchestras' moonlighting created a network which makes it possible to define a collective interest, and to test new assumptions regarding economic and social responsibility.

Today, through the commercial diffusion of Sufi music, songs, psalms (including during weddings and festivals as well as commercials recordings) and the trade related to crowned divination and exorcism, the Aissawa members establish social integration. Although this phenomenon causes the appearance of new aesthetic standards through more commercial adaptations of mystical psalms, it also leads to the loss of original Sufi doctrines through severe competition between musicians which in turn degrades the social link between the disciples.

== Commentaries on the Aissawa ==
Many past and contemporary researchers have shown an interest in the Aissawa, particularly from the point of view of studying the religious contours of a Muslim society. Former commentaries on the brotherhood were written in French and Arabic with the first Arab examples being biographical and hagiographic collections compiled between the 14th and 16th century by Moroccan biographers such as Al-Ghazali, Ibn `Askar, Al-Fassi, Al-Mahdi and Al-Kettani. These texts, which may be handwritten or printed, provide information on the genealogical and spiritual affiliations of the founder of the order, while at the same time enumerating the numerous wonders he realized for the benefit of his sympathizers. Contemporary Arab authors who have studied this topic include Daoui, Al-Malhouni and Aissawî, who are the current mezwar of the brotherhood in person. These endeavour to put in perspective the Sufi order in the cultural and religious tradition of Morocco through the study of the biography of the founder, and his spiritual doctrine alongside poetic and liturgical texts.

The first French writings on the Aissawa appeared at the end of the 19th century following the installation of colonial administration in the Morocco. The majority of the authors, who were also anthropologists and sociologists, were at that time French and included Pierre-Jacques André, Alfred Bel, René Brunel, Octave Depont and Xavier Coppolani, Emile Dermenghem, Edmond Doutté, George Drague, Roger Tourneau, Louis Rinn (chief of the Central Service of the indigenous Affairs to the Government General in Algeria at the end of the 19th century), Louis Massignon and Edouard Michaux-Bellaire. These last three authors were military officers with the scientific expedition of the Administration of Indigenous Affairs and their writings are published in the Moroccan Files and the Review of the Muslim World. Among all these French authors, there was also the Finnish anthropologist Edward Westermarck, whose various works are devoted to an analysis of the system of belief and ritual in Morocco.

Excepting those authors with a scientific approach, the ritual practices of Aissawa drew the attention of and considerably disturbed western observers at the beginning of the 19th century. The brotherhood is evoked here and there in medical works, monographs, schoolbooks, paintings, tests or accounts of voyages. These various writings show a recurring passionate contempt for this type of religiosity. Spiritual dimensions of the brotherhood of Aissawa at that time were never examined, other than by Emile Dermenghem in his acclaimed Le culte des saints dans l'Islam Maghrebin (Paris, 1951). Other texts were only very seldom neutral. By attaching a non-Muslim and archaic label to some brotherhoods (such as the Aissawa but also the Hamadcha and Gnaoua), these writings served to legitimize French prerogatives in Morocco.

== Contemporary scientific research ==
Some authors of religious history (Jeanmaire) and ethnomusicology (Gilbert Mullet and Andre Boncourt) became interested in the Aissawa in the 1950s and remain so to this day. It was only after Moroccan and Algerian independence since the 1960s that contemporary social scientists began to consider the subject. Many articles (Belhaj, Daoui, Hanai, Nabti and Andezian) and theses (Al Malhouni, Boncourt, Lahlou, El Abar, Sagir Janjar and Nabti) as well as ethnographic movies have studied the ritual practices of Aissawa in Morocco.

== New approaches and prospects ==
An analysis of the work by Sossie Andezian regarding the Aissawa brotherhood and Sufism in Algeria, is considered essential and impossible to circumvent. In her book The Significance of Sufism in Algeria in the aftermath of Independence (2001), Andezian analyzes the processes of reinvention of ritual acts in the context of sociopolitical movements in Algeria. Her reflection leads to a dynamic vision of the religious and mystical rites while highlighting the evolution of the links that people, marginalized in the religious sphere, maintain with the official and textual religious institutions. Continuing the reflexions of Andezian, Mehdi Nabti conducted an investigation inside the Aissawa brotherhood in Morocco in his doctoral thesis entitled The Aissawa brotherhood in urban areas of Morocco: the social and ritual aspects of modern sufism, which is considered a significant contribution to the socio-anthropology of the current Maghreb. Nabti shows the complex modalities of the inscription of the brotherhood in a Moroccan society led by an authoritative government (which try timidly to be liberalized), endemic unemployment, the development of tourism and the progress of political Islamism. While immersing himself as a ritual musician within the Aissawa orchestras, Mehdi Nabti casts new light on knowledge of Sufism and brings invaluable facts on the structure of the brotherhood and its rituals as well as the diverse logic behind affiliation to a traditional religious organization in a modern Muslim society. His work, which offers an iconographic description of musical scores pointing to esoteric symbolism and a DVD documentary, is the greatest sum of knowledge currently available on the subject. Mehdi Nabti is also the leader of the Aissawaniyya Orchestra, which brings together French jazzmen and Aissawa musicians. The band plays concerts all over the world and also conducts master classes.
