= Mohammed al-Hadi ben Issa =

Moroccan scholar of Sufism (1467–1526)

Al-Shaykh al-Kamil
- Born: 1467; Safi, Morocco
- Died: 1526 (59 years)
- Venerated in: Ash'ari religion
- Major shrine: Buried in Cheikh Al Kamel Mausoleum, Meknes, Morocco
- Feast: yearly Mawsim festival
- Patronage: City of Meknes
- Influences: Muhammad al-Jazuli, Abdelaziz al-Tebaa
- Influenced: Abu Al-Ruwayn

Muḥammad al-Hādī ibn ʿĪsā al-Ṣufyānī al-Mukhtārī (Arabic: محمد الهادي بن عيسى; 1467–1526) also known by his title al-Shaykh al-Kāmil (Arabic: الشيخ الكامل) was a Moroccan scholar of Sufism and also an ascetic. He was the founder of the Isawiyya Sufi order.

== Biography ==
Mohammed al-Hadi ben Issa was a distant descendant of Idris I of Morocco, and he came from the tribe of Awlad Abi Sebaa. He spent most of his childhood as an orphan; his father and brothers fought against the Portuguese but were killed by their commander, Afonso V of Portugal. In his teenage years, he was initiated into the Sufi order of Muhammad al-Jazuli, and lived on to succeed him in such matters. He was a very patient and calm person as he grew older, with more reliance on his god. He became a popularity amongst the people around him, and he took advantage of this to start his own Sufi order, the Isawiyya. Mohammed al-Hadi ben Issa died in 1526, and he was buried in Meknes, where a shrine was established over his grave.

== Legacy ==
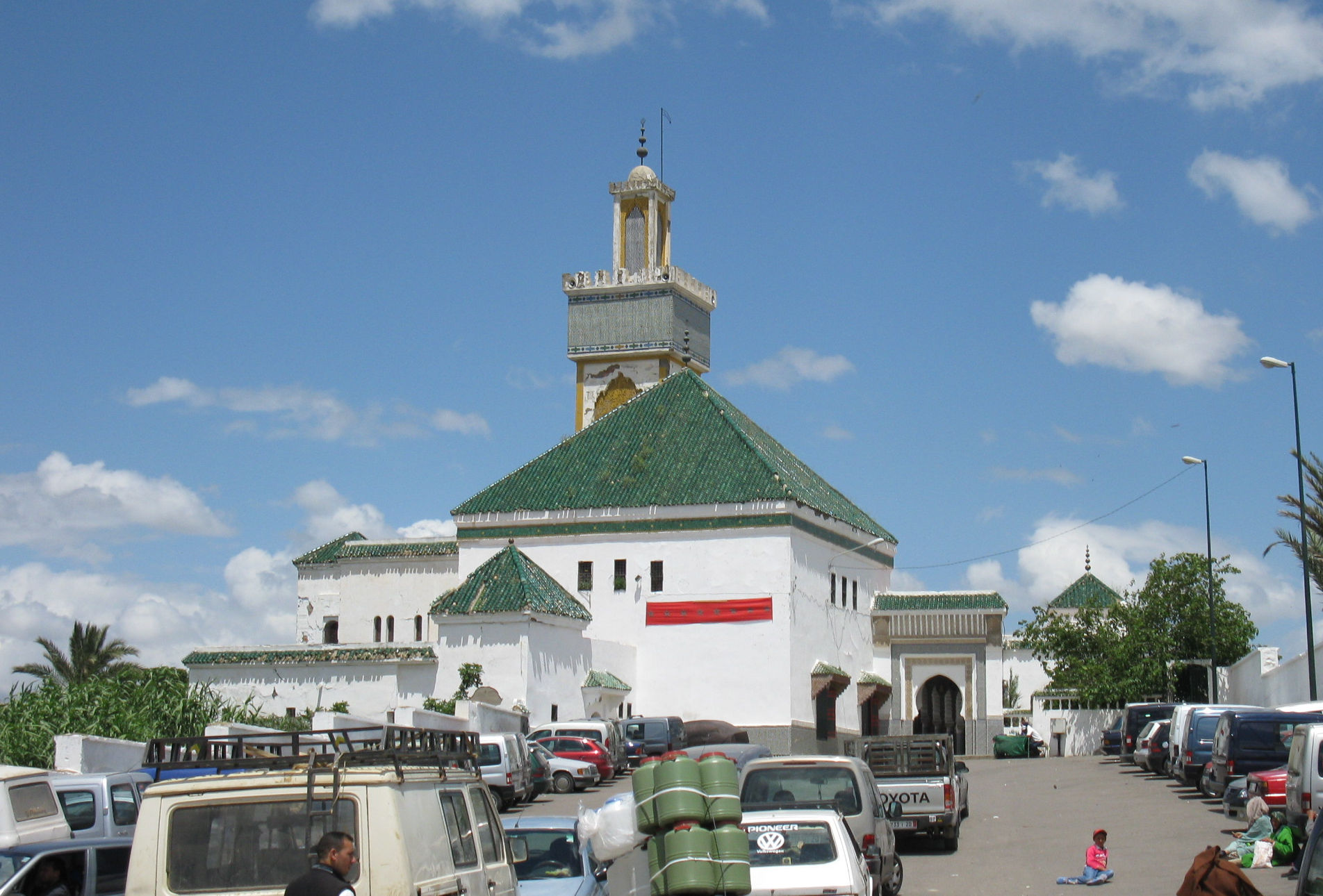
The Cheikh Al Kamel Mausoleum where Mohammed al-Hadi ben Issa is buried.

After his death, the Issawi order flourished. It is now widespread throughout not only Morocco, but also Libya, Tunisia and even Algeria. Many zawiyas for the order exist in Morocco now as well. The shrine over the grave of Mohammed al-Hadi ben Issa was entirely reconstructed in 1776 by the Alaouite ruler, Mohammed ben Abdallah. It is now a popular spot in Meknes for religious tourism, and it also functions as a mosque.

== See also ==
- Islam in Morocco
- Sufism
- List of Sufi saints
