= Farah El Fassi =

Moroccan actress

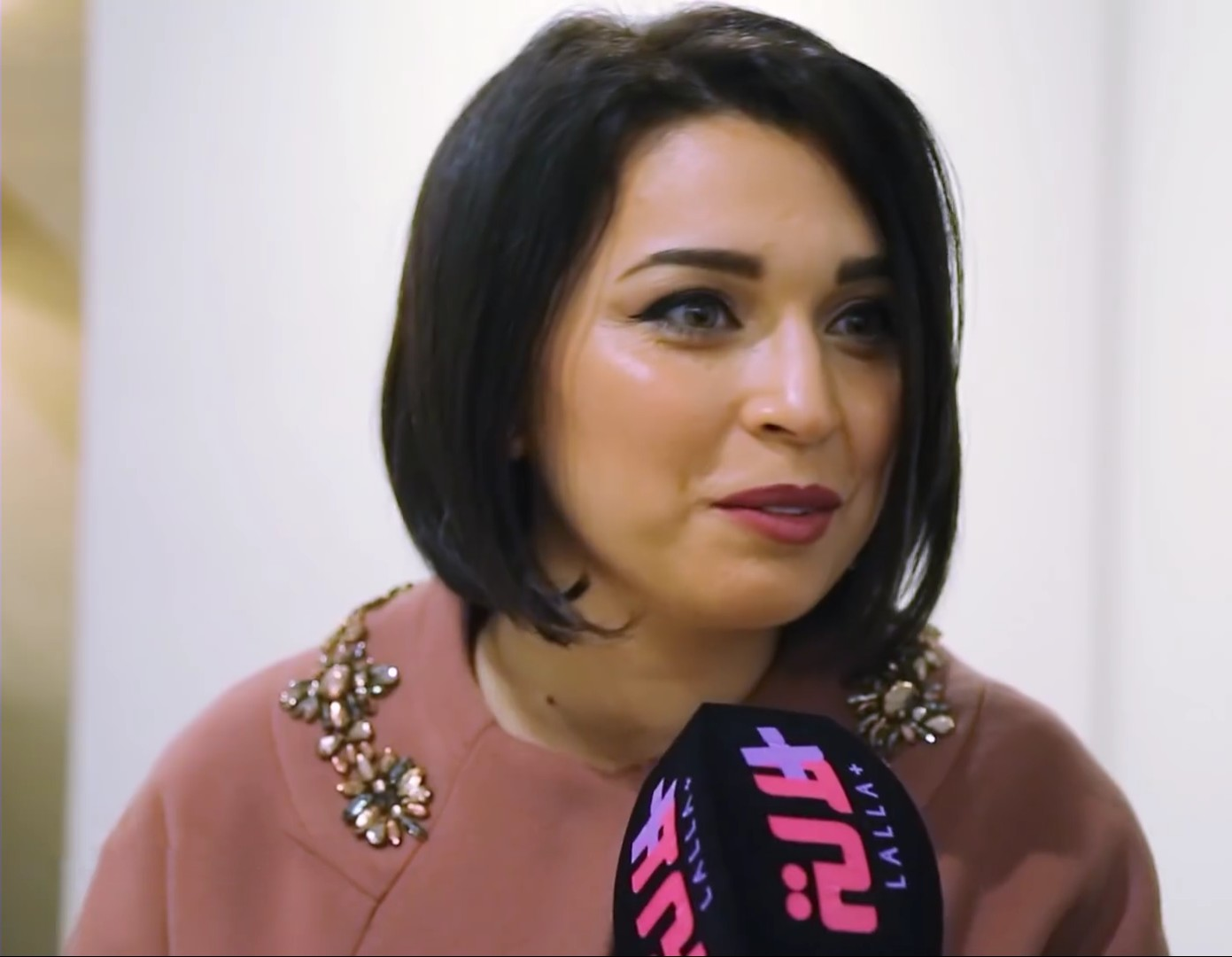
- Occupation: Actress

Farah El Fassi is a Moroccan actress.

== Filmography ==
=== Feature films ===
- 2008: Le temps des camarades
- 2011: L'enfant cheikh
- 2015: Petits bonheurs
