= Abdellatif Berbich =

Moroccan professor of internal medicine

Professor Abdellatif Berbich FAAS
- عبد اللطيف بربيش
- Born: 17 May 1934; Fez, Morocco
- Died: 1 January 2015 (aged 80); Rabat, Morocco
- Resting place: Martyrs' Cemetery
- Education: University of Montpellier; University Hospital Center of Paris
- Occupation: Medical doctor
- Awards: Royal Victorian Order (Commander); French Order of Arts and Letters (Commander); Order of the Throne (Great officer)
- Scientific career
- Fields: Nephrology
- Institutions: University of Rabat; Ibn Sina-Avicenne hospital

Abdellatif Berbich FAAS (Arabic: عبد اللطيف بربيش, 17 May 1942 – 1 January 2015) was a professor of internal medicine. He was the founding Chairman of the nephrology Moroccan company, Permanent Secretary of the Academy of the Kingdom of Morocco, and Morocco's ambassador to Algiers.

== Education ==
Berbich was born in Fez, Morocco on 17 May, 1934. He attended Moulay Youssef and Gouraud high schools for his secondary education. He obtained a doctorate in medicine in 1961 from the University of Montpellier. Between 1962 and 1964, he pursued a specialty in Nephrology and medical resuscitation at the University Hospital Center of Paris (Hospital Necker).

== Career ==
In 1967, Berbich was an associate professor of medicine at the University of Rabat and in 1968, he became the chief physician of Ibn Sina-Avicenne hospital. In the same year, he was appointed as the Dean of the Faculty of Medicine of the University of Rabat up until 1974. In 1982, he became the permanent secretary of the Kingdom of Morocco and in 1988, he became the ambassador of Morocco in Algiers.

In October 1968, he became the first Director of Kidney transplant in Morocco and in 1973, he created the first chronic hemodialysis in Morocco.

== Fellowship and membership ==
Berbich was elected a Fellow of the African Academy of Sciences in 1986. He is a Founding member of the Moroccan associations of medical sciences and nephrology, a Member of French and international Nephrology associations, the French National Association of Internal Medicine, and the French National Academy of medicine.

== Awards and honours ==
Berbich was awarded Hassi Beida Medal and Star of War award in 1963, the Commander of the Royal Victorian Order in 1987, Commander of the French Order of Arts and Letters in 1989, the Commander of the Order of the Throne of Morocco in 1989, and the Commander of the Legion of Honor 2000. He was also awarded the Commander of the Order of Merit in Spain, Germany, Denmark, Italy, Portugal and Senegal.

He was awarded posthumously the Throne medal, Great officer of Morocco in 2015.

== Death ==
Berbich died in Rabat, Morocco on 1 January 2015, aged 80, and was buried in Martyrs' Cemetery.

== See also ==
- Faïrouz Malek
- Farida Fassi
