= Muhammad al-Jazuli =

15th-century Moroccan Sufi saint-scholar

Imam Muhammad ibn Sulayman al-Jazuli al-Simlali
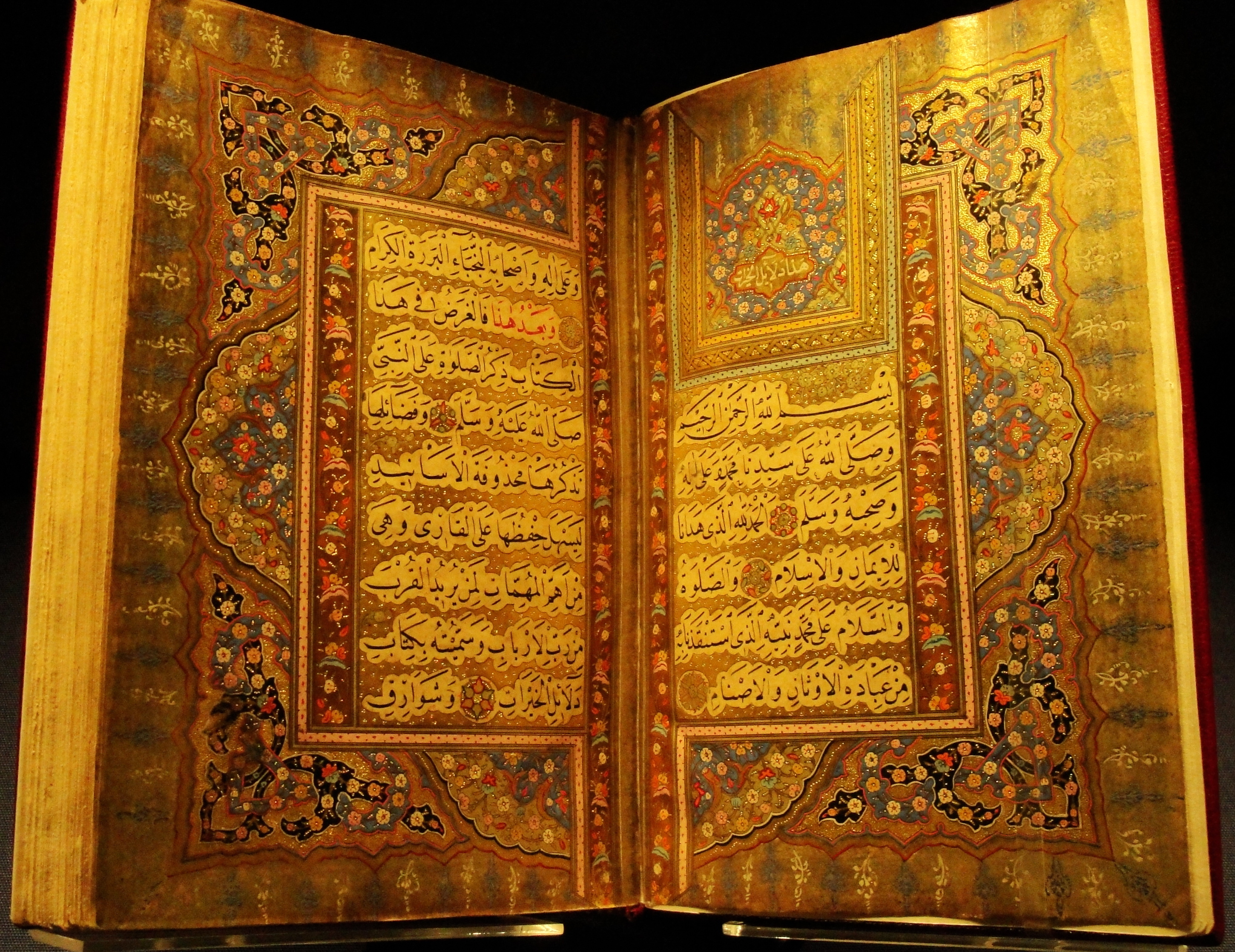
- Copy of Dala'il al-Khayrat at the Chester Beatty Library
- Title: Imam, Sheikh

Personal life
- Born: c. 1404 Sous, Morocco
- Died: 1465 (aged 60–61) Sidi Chiker, Morocco
- Resting place: Marrakesh
- Era: 15th century
- Main interest: Sufism
- Notable work: Dala'il al-Khayrat

Religious life
- Religion: Islam
- Denomination: Sunni
- Jurisprudence: Maliki
- Tariqa: Shadhilia

Muslim leader
- Influenced by: Abul Hasan ash-Shadhili
- Influenced: Yusuf an-Nabhani Ahmed Raza Khan Barelvi

Abū 'Abdullah Muḥammad ibn Sulaymān ibn Abū Bakr al-Jazūli al-Simlālī (Arabic: أبو عبدالله محمد بن سليمان بن ابوبكر الجزولي السّملالي الحسني) (d. 1465AD = 870AH), often known as Imam al-Jazuli or Sheikh Jazuli, was a Moroccan Sufi Saint. He is best known for compiling the Dala'il al-Khayrat, an extremely popular Muslim prayer book. This book is usually divided into 7 sections for each day of the week. Al-Jazuli is one of the seven saints of Marrakesh and is buried in his mausoleum inside the city.

== Biography ==
Muhammad al-Jazuli claimed to be a Sharif (a descent of Muhammad) and belonged to the Berber Jazulin tribe. He lived in the historic Sous area of Morocco, situated between the Atlantic Ocean and the Atlas Mountains, and studied locally before going to the Madrasat As-Saffarîn in Fez where his room is still pointed out to visitors today. After settling a tribal feud he left the area and spent the next forty years in Makkah, Medina and Jerusalem. After his long journey, he returned to Fez where he completed the prayer book Dala'il al-Khayrat.

He was initiated into the Shadhili Tariqa, a Sufi order, by a descendant of Abu Abdallah Mohammed Amghar, the sheikh of the Banu Amghar. He spent fourteen years in Khalwa (seclusion) and then went to Safi where he gathered around him many followers. The governor of Safi felt obliged to expel him and later poisoned him which led to his death in 1465. He is said to have died during prayer.

It is claimed that in 1541, seventy-seven years after his death, his body was exhumed to be transferred to Marrakesh and found to be uncorrupted.

== See also ==
- List of Sufis
- Mohammed al-Hadi ben Issa, the son of one of his disciples who founded the Issawa order
- Qari Muhammad Muslehuddin Siddiqui
- Ahmed ou Musa (saint)
