= Mohammed V Foundation for Solidarity =

Social solidarity institution with public benefit and financial independence

- مؤسسة محمد الخامس للتضامن
- Formation: 5 July 1999; 27 years ago
- Founder: Mohammed VI
- Type: Nonprofit organization
- Legal status: Public utility organization
- Purpose: Social action
- Headquarters: Rabat, Morocco
- Affiliations: United Nations Economic and Social Council (special consultative status)
- Website: fm5.ma/en

Mohammed V Foundation for Solidarity is a Moroccan non-profit organization recognized as being of public utility, established on 5 July 1999 at the initiative of Mohammed VI, then Crown Prince. It operates primarily in the fields of social action, healthcare and human development in Morocco.

The Foundation conducts programs aimed at improving the living conditions of vulnerable populations, notably through the development of social and healthcare infrastructure, as well as solidarity and assistance initiatives.

It holds special consultative status with the United Nations Economic and Social Council.

== History ==
The Mohammed V Foundation for Solidarity was established on 5 July 1999 at the initiative of Mohammed VI.

Its creation took place in a context of structuring solidarity-based actions in Morocco, with the aim of coordinating and developing initiatives for populations in situations of vulnerability.

Over time, it expanded its areas of intervention, particularly in healthcare, social integration and local development, through the implementation of programs and the construction of infrastructure.

In 2015, the Foundation obtained special consultative status with the United Nations Economic and Social Council.

== Mission ==
The Mohammed V Foundation for Solidarity operates in the field of social action in Morocco. Its activities include:

- assistance to populations in situations of vulnerability;
- improving access to basic services, particularly in healthcare and social services;
- construction and equipment of social and healthcare infrastructure;
- establishment of reception, care and support facilities;
- implementation of social integration and local development programs.

These activities are carried out in partnership with public institutions, local authorities and other stakeholders.

== Activities ==
=== Proximity medical centers ===
In March 2024, King Mohammed VI laid the foundation stone for a proximity medical center in the Lissasfa district, in the Hay Hassani arrondissement of Casablanca. On the same occasion, the second phase of the connected mobile medical units program was launched.

The Lissasfa proximity medical center forms part of a program to develop local healthcare infrastructure. With an investment of 90 million dirhams, it is the third center of its kind in the Casablanca-Settat region, following those established in Sidi Moumen and the new town of Errahma.

The facility is designed as an intermediate structure between primary healthcare facilities (levels 1 and 2) and the hospital network. Its capacity is estimated at approximately 60,000 beneficiaries per year.

The project is carried out in partnership with the Ministry of Health and Social Protection. It is part of a national program providing for the construction of twelve proximity medical centers: three in Casablanca, two in Fez, two in Tangier, and one in each of the cities of Agadir, Marrakesh, Rabat, Salé and Témara.

=== Marhaba operation ===
The Mohammed V Foundation for Solidarity participates in the organization of the “Marhaba” operation, a reception system for Moroccans living abroad during their return to Morocco, implemented annually during the summer period.

This system is organized in coordination with several national institutions and involves the deployment of assistance services at major entry points, including ports, airports and certain border crossings.

The operation includes:

- reception and orientation areas;
- social and medical assistance services;
- information and administrative support services;
- on-site support teams.

The system is deployed both in Morocco and in certain European ports connected to the Kingdom.

=== Connected mobile medical units program ===
The connected mobile medical units program is implemented by the Mohammed V Foundation for Solidarity in partnership with the Ministry of Health and Social Protection and MEDIOT Technology.Its first phase, launched on 28 October 2023, involved the deployment of 50 connected mobile medical units across 34 provinces in nine regions of Morocco. A second phase, launched in March 2024, provides for the deployment of an additional 50 units.Each unit includes two consultation and treatment spaces equipped with basic medical instruments, connectivity systems and biomedical equipment for remote consultations.The units are operated by teams consisting of a general practitioner, two nurses and an administrative staff member. They provide general consultations, outpatient care, tele-expertise services and public health follow-up.Tele-expertise is used when a general practitioner requests the opinion of a specialist in fields such as obstetrics and gynecology, pediatrics, endocrinology, dermatology, ENT, cardiology, pulmonology and nephrology. Specialists operate from a central telemedicine platform located in Casablanca.A tele-expertise simulation was carried out during the program’s launch.As of 25 March, the 50 units deployed during the first phase had provided 119,532 medical services to 104,041 people, 65% of whom were women. Of these, 96,753 were general consultations and care, and 11,989 required tele-expertise.

=== Vehicle donations following the September 2023 earthquake ===
Following the earthquake of 8 September 2023, the Foundation carried out the distribution of transport vehicles to local authorities and associations.Three ambulances and five utility vehicles were symbolically handed over to representatives of the municipalities of Adassil, Talat N’Yacoub and Tizi N’Test, as well as to five associations.

The operation involved a total of 46 vehicles distributed to municipalities, associations and cooperatives across different regions of Morocco.

== Standing committee of support ==
STANDING COMMITTEE OF SUPPORT
COMARIT
HUILERIES DU SOUSS
Banque Populaire du Maroc
Groupe HOLMARCOM
Minoterie Aït Melloul
ATTIJARIWAFA BANK
MAVELTEX
Société Centrale de Réassurance
Jorf Lasfar Energy Company (JLEC)
Office Chérifien des phosphates
Société Royale d'Encouragement du Cheva
Groupe AZURA
S.G.M.B
Crédit Agricole du Maroc
MEDITELECOM
LAFARGE MAROC
Bank Al-Maghrib
SAMIR
COFARMA
Example
Zurich compagnie marocaine d'assurance
ONEP
CNIA Assurance
RMA-WATANIYA
LA MAROCAINE DES JEUX ET DU SPORT
Agence Nationale de la Conservation Foncière, du Cadastre et de la Cartographie
Société de gestion de la Loterie Nationale
Crédit du Maroc
Centrale Laitière
Altadis Maroc
AXA ASSURANCE MAROC
Office National des aéroports
BARID AL MAGHRIB
VEOLIA MAROC
Omnium Marocain de Pêche
ONE
Société d'entreprise Houar
ATELIER IKS
Cabinet Immobilier Lazrak
IMMO K-TRUST
Fondation CDG
BMCE BANK
DOUJA PROMOTION GROUPE ADDOHA
Caisse de dépôt et de gestion
DIANA HOLDING
Groupe O.N.A
Société Nationale de Transport et de Logistique
Agence Nationale de Réglementation des Télécommunications
Maroc telecom
Société SONASR
MCMA-MAMDA
AKWA HOLDING SA
Office National des Hydrocarbures et des Mine
Groupe SAFARI
Groupe ANASSI
COMANAV
Banque Marocaine pour le commerce et l'industrie
ROYAL AIR MAROC
LESIEUR CRISTAL
MARSA MAROC
MAROCLEAR
BRASSERIES DU MAROC
Office National des Chemins de Fer

== See also ==
- Voluntary association
