= Abd al-Rahman al-Fasi =

Moroccan writer

Personal life
- Born: Abu Zaid Abd al-Rahman Abu Muhammad Ibn Abd al-Qadir al-Fasi; 1631; Fez, Morocco
- Died: 1685; Fez, Morocco
- Main interest(s): Law, History, Astronomy, Music
- Notable work(s): Hawashi ala Kalam; Ibtihaj al-qulub bi khabar al-Shaykh Abi al-Mahasin wa wa shaykhihi al-Majdhub; Sharh al' Amal al-Fasi; al-Djumu fi ilm al-musiqi wa'l tubul

Religious life
- Religion: Islam
- Denomination: Sunni
- Jurisprudence: Maliki

Senior posting
- Influenced by: Abd al-Qadir Ibn Ali Ibn Yusuf al-Fasi

Abu Zaid Abd al-Rahman Abu Muhammad Ibn Abd al-Qadir al-Fasi (Arabic: أبو زيد عبد الرحمن أبو محمد بن عبد القادر الفاسي; c. 1631–1685) was a Moroccan writer in the field of law, history, astronomy and music. He wrote some 170 books and has been called the Suyuti of his time. He was born in the prominent family of al-Fasi and he was a follower of his father, the Sufi saint Abd al-Qadir Ibn Ali Ibn Yusuf al-Fasi (1599–1680).

== Books by al-Fasi ==
- Hawashi ala Kalam, Fez 1899
- Ibtihaj al-qulub bi khabar al-Shaykh Abi al-Mahasin wa wa shaykhihi al-Majdhub (a biography of Abu l-Mahasin Yusuf al-Fasi and other Moroccan sheikhs)
- Sharh al' Amal al-Fasi (treatise on law), lithography, Fes, ed. Al-Matba'a al Maghribiya, 1899
- Bu Şinaq, translated by Nicolae Dobrişan, ANA, 2nd vol., p. 128–134.
- al-Djumu fi ilm al-musiqi wa'l tubul (The gatherings in the theory of music and the musical modes)

== See also ==
- Mohammed al-Qasim al-Sijilmasi
