= Malika al-Fassi =

Moroccan writer (1919–2007)

Malika al-Fassi (Arabic: مالكة الفاسي, b. 19 June 1919 – d. 12 May 2007) was a Moroccan writer and nationalist. She was the only woman to sign the Proclamation of Independence of Morocco in 1944. She was a student of Abdeslam Serghini.

At a very young age she wrote articles under the pseudonym El Fatate, later after her marriage, under the pseudonym Bahitate El Hadira (researcher of the city), and not El Hadara (civilisation). At that time there was a well-known Egyptian journalist, Malak Hifni Nasif, who used the name Bahithat El Badiyya. Her articles appeared in Majellate El Maghrib of Saleh Missa and Rissalate El Maghrib of Said Hajji, and later in the daily newspaper El Alam, since 1934.

She also wrote plays which have been staged and some small novels, a.o. La Victime.

== Biography ==
Malika Al Fassi was born on 19 June 1919 in Fez into the prominent Fassi Fihri family. Her father, the Cadi El Mehdi El Fassi, wanted her to receive the same education as her two brothers since he believed education was important for increasing nationalist awareness. After she went to Dar Fkiha, her father brought her tutors in various disciplines, including Arabic and French grammar, and sports education. She was also an outstanding horseman.

At a very young age, she wrote articles under the pseudonym El Fatate, then after her marriage, under the pseudonym Bahitate El Hadira (city researcher), and not El Hadara (civilization), because at that time there was a very famous Lebanese journalist, Mey, who signed Bahitate El Badia. Her articles appeared in Majellate El Maghrib by Saleh Missa and Rissalate El Maghrib by Saïd Hajji, and later in the newspaper El Alam, as early as 1934. She has also written plays that have been performed, and a few short novels, including The Victim.

Being a musician from a very young age (she plays the lute and the accordion), she founded with Haj Driss Touimi Benjelloun Jamiyât Houat "El moussika al andaloussia".

She married her late cousin Mohamed Ghali El Fassi in 1935. She joined the nationalist movement in a secret committee known as Taïfa in 19372. She took part in drawing up the independence manifesto with her companions in the nationalist movement, and signed it on 11 January 1944. She is the only woman among the 66 signatories3,2. Her husband being Prince Moulay Hassan's teacher, from 1942 onwards, she had her entrances to the Palace without attracting the attention of the colonizer. When her companions were thrown into prison, she led the Resistance and Women's Action with those of the Resistance leaders who had escaped from jail and exile.

On the night of August 19, 1953, she entered in disguise to see the late His Majesty Mohammed V, she was able to bring him a new Bayïâa of the Ulemas, and they took an oath to fight against the occupier, and he gave her his instructions for the Resistance2. She was the last person to see him before his exile. She then began the armed Resistance with her brothers and sisters in arms.

She started fighting illiteracy long before independence and she militated for girls to go to school and continue their studies. With her late husband, then director of the Qaraouiyine, and the agreement of the late His Majesty Mohammed V, she opened a girls' section, both secondary and university, in 19472. The first promotion included Habiba El Bourqadi, Aïcha Sekkat, Fettouma Kabbaj, etc. Fettouma Kabbaj is today a member of the National Superior Council of Ulemas (Oum El Banine school was only a primary school). Moreover, she drives, having passed her driving licence in 1955. This allows her to travel all over Morocco in order to set up centres and encourage people to enrol in literacy classes2.

She lobbied the French Director of Education to create schools for girls, and chaired delegations to this end, and eventually won her case. At independence, she was among the founders of the Moroccan League for Basic Education and the Fight against Illiteracy, and was its vice-president. In 1956, she was also among the founders of the institution of Entraide Nationale, under the presidency of Princess Lalla Aïcha. Just after independence, she presented a motion to the late His Majesty Mohammed V for the vote of women, which he adopted immediately. Also in 1956, she participated in the creation of an NGO, the Al Mouassat Association, recognized as being of public utility. Malika El Fassi became its president in 1960. This association takes care of the destitute, disaster victims, cancer patients in need and their families, as well as fighting illiteracy. Above all, the association has an orphanage that houses 120 girls. It is one of the first to be chosen to receive a grant by the NHRI Commission, established by His Majesty King Mohammed VI.

Finally, Alison Baker, in "Voices of Resistance", names Malika Al Fassi as Formother Of Resistance. Malika Al Fassi has participated in several symposia and given various lectures in China, Romania, USSR, etc. She is a UNESCO medalist for her fight against illiteracy. She also has a medal from the Moroccan League for Basic Education and the Fight against Illiteracy. She has a medal from the Russian government for her contribution to the friendship between Morocco and Russia. She was decorated by His Majesty King Mohammed VI with the rank of Grand Commander of the Ussaam Al Arch Al Alaoui on 11 January 2005. Finally, in March 2006, she received a Khmissa of Honour at Khmissa 2006 for her activism. She died on Saturday 12 May 2007.

== Political career ==
Malika Al Fassi was the only woman to sign the 1944 Independence Manifesto. In addition, she is one of the pioneers of the Moroccan feminist movement.

In 1935, at the age of 15, she published in the magazine al-Maghreb the first of a long series of articles in which she claimed the right of Moroccan women to education. She became the first woman journalist in the country. Her argument is always strategic: without education, women can be neither the ideal companions of men nor good educators of future generations. Inevitably, she will trigger societal debates that have contributed to making the reform of the status of women a national necessity.

In 1955, she demanded the right to vote for women from King Mohammed V. The latter approved it, explaining that the right to vote did justice to Moroccan women, since they had participated fully in the advent of independence in 1956.

== Publications ==
Articles:

- Hawl taha-fut al-fatayat ‘ala-l-lisseh ("On Young Women Flocking to the Lycée"), al-Maghrib (1938)
- Ta‘lim al-fatah ("The Education of Girls") and Sawt al-fatah ("The Voice of Young Women"), al-Maghrib magazine (1938)
- al-Fatah al-Maghribiya bayn marahil al-ta‘lim ("Moroccan Women Between Phases of Education), Risalat al-Maghrib magazine (1952)
- Ta‘lim al-mar’a ("Women’s Education"), Risalat al-Maghrib (1952).

Books:

- Dhikrayat bi-mathabat sira dhatiya ("Memories as Autobiography"), also published in a series of articles in al-Maghrib newspaper between May and June 1938
