= Abu al-Mahasin Yusuf al-Fasi =

Moroccan Sufi (1530/31–1604)

Personal life
- Born: Abu al-Mahasin Yusuf ibn Mohammed Yusuf al-Fasi; 1530/1531 Ksar-el-Kebir, Morocco
- Died: 14 August 1604 Fes, Morocco
- Resting place: Zawiya al-Fassiya, Fes
- Notable work: Dala'il Al Khayrat commentary
- Known for: Founder of the Zawiya al-Fassiya in Fes, Major figure in Moroccan Sufism
- Occupation: Scholar, Sufi leader
- Relatives: Mohammed al-Arbi al-Fasi (son)

Religious life
- Religion: Islam

Abu al-Mahasin Yusuf ibn Mohammed Yusuf al-Fasi (Arabic: أبوالمحاسن يوسف الفاسي) (1530/1531 in Ksar-el-Kebir, Morocco – 14 August 1604 in Fes, Morocco) was a major figure of Moroccan Sufism and the founder of the Zawiya al-Fassiya in Fes. He belonged to the al-Fasi Family. He is notable for his influence on the whole of northwest Africa. In 1578 he took part in the famous Battle of Ksar El Kebir against the Portuguese. He is the father of Mohammed al-Arbi al-Fasi.
