= Maghrebi Arabs =

Ethnic Arabs of North Africa

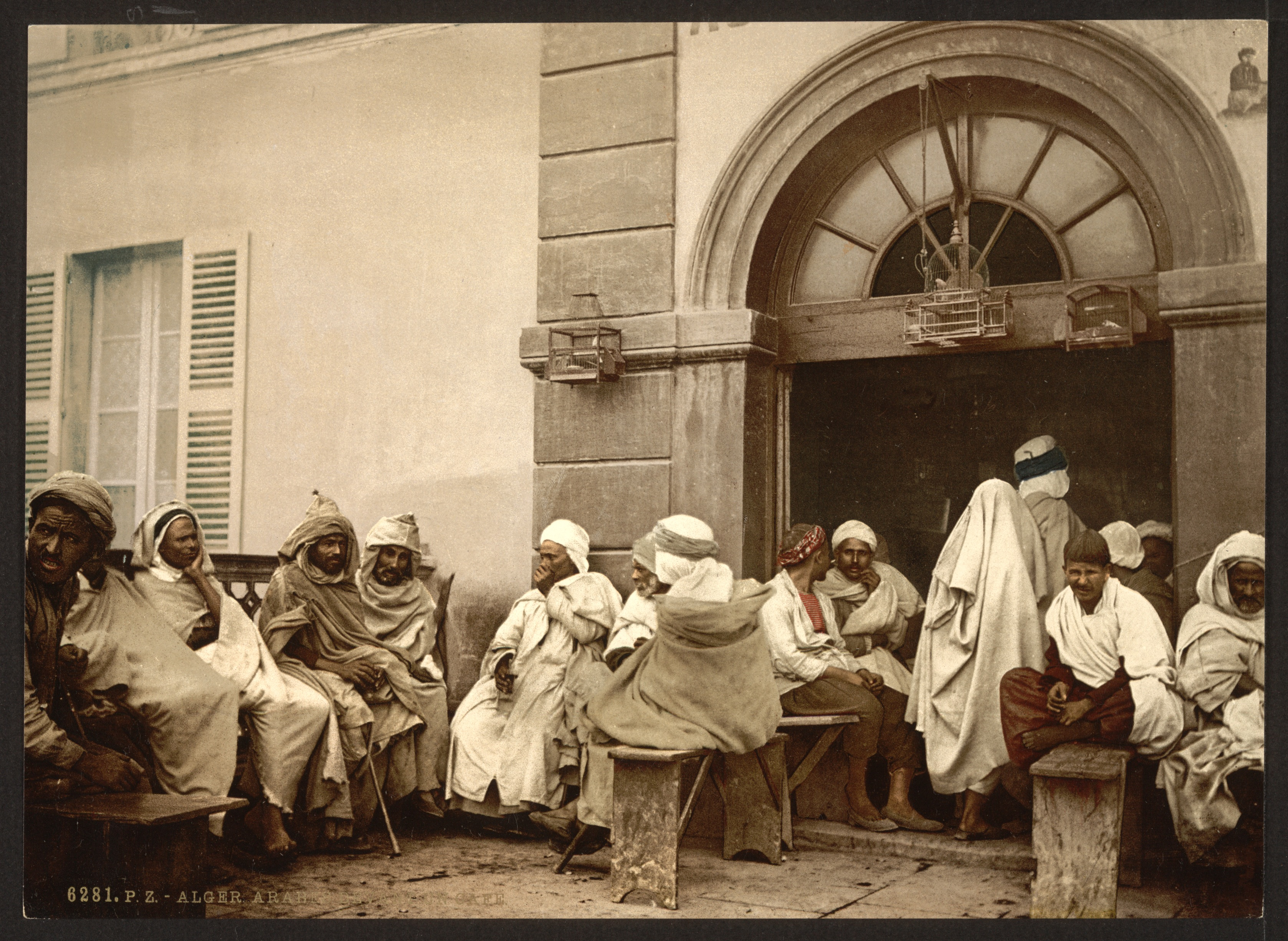
Arabs at a cafe in Algiers, 1899.

Maghrebi Arabs (Arabic: العرب المغاربة, romanized: al-‘Arab al-Maghāriba) or North African Arabs (Arabic: عرب شمال أفريقيا, romanized: ‘Arab Shamāl Ifrīqiyā) are the inhabitants of the Maghreb region of North Africa whose ethnic identity is Arab and whose native language is Arabic. This ethnic identity is a product of the centuries-long Arab migration to the Maghreb since the 7th century, which changed the demographic scope of the Maghreb and was a major factor in the ethnic, linguistic and cultural Arabization of the Maghreb region.

== History ==
=== 7th century ===
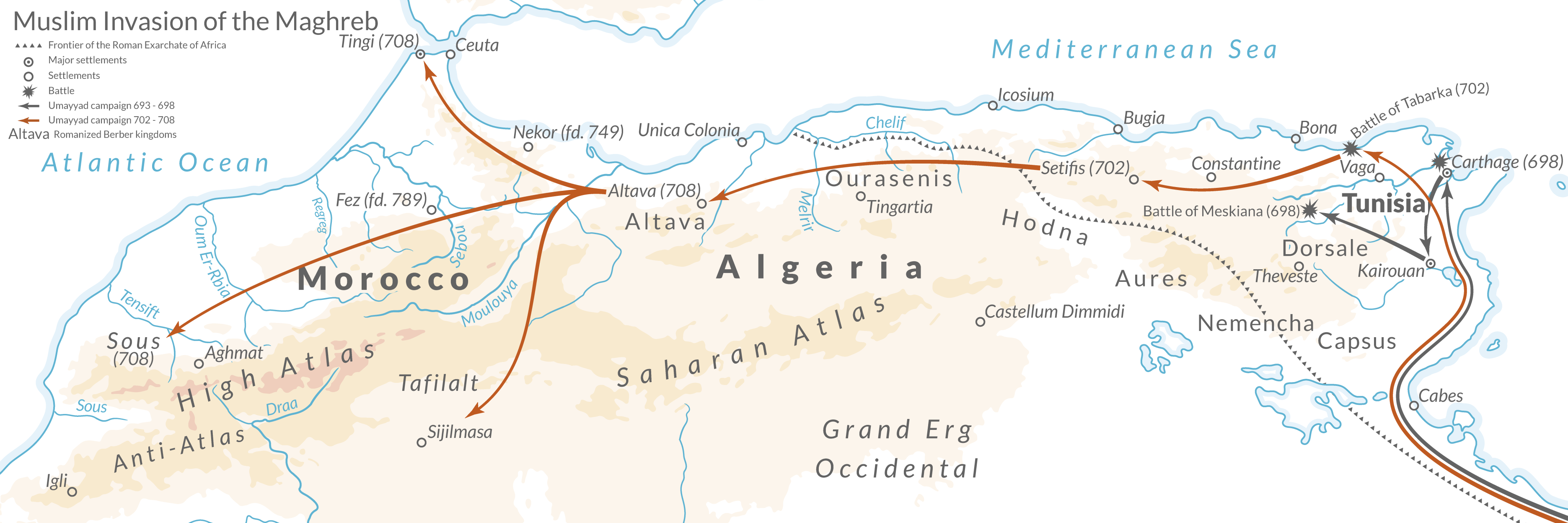
Map depicting the routes Umayyad armies took during the Arab conquest of the Maghreb in the 7th century

Arab migration first started in 647 with the Arab conquest of the Maghreb under the Rashidun Caliphate, when Abdallah ibn Sa'd led the invasion with 20,000 soldiers from Medina in the Arabian Peninsula. The invasion swiftly took over Tripolitania and then defeated a much larger Byzantine army at the Battle of Sufetula in the same year, forcing the new Byzantine Exarch of Africa to pay tribute.

Increasing Arab migration towards the end of the 7th century finally overcame Berber and Byzantine resistance, gradually converting the Berbers to Islam and incorporating the entire Maghreb into the Umayyad Caliphate. Throughout the period of conquest, Arab migrants settled in all parts of the Maghreb, coming as peaceful newcomers and were welcomed everywhere. Large Arab settlements were established in many areas. A considerable portion of the Arab colonists belonged to the Najdi tribe of Banu Tamim, though these colonies would later fall into decadence and were gradually absorbed into the local population. Arabians arrived in the Maghreb in large numbers after an expedition by the Banu Muzaina tribe to the Maghreb under the leadership of Zayd ibn Haritha al-Kalbi in the 7th–8th century. The Arab Muslim conquerors had a much more durable impact on the culture of the Maghreb than did the region's conquerors before and after them, and by the 11th century, the Berbers had become Islamized and Arabized.

During the Umayyad conquest, 40,000 Arab troops from Egypt were brought in. The Umayyads controlled the vast territory of the Maghreb through a military force of 50,000 Arabian soldiers who originally served in Egypt. These became a hereditary ruling class primarily made up of the conquerors and their descendants with very few outsiders. Land grants were given to these soldiers, creating a landed Arab aristocracy with extensive landholdings, cultivated in many cases by slaves from sub-Saharan Africa. An example of these were the Fihrids, descendants of Uqba ibn Nafi, who occupied a privileged position in Ifriqiyan and Andalusi society. There were other powerful Arab settlers who briefly appeared in the sources, especially those of Qurayshi ancestry. Arab settlers mostly settled in cities, such as Kairouan, until the migration of the nomadic Banu Hilal and Banu Sulaym in the 11th century. The Umayyad Caliphate was aware of the importance of the importance of the spread and settlement of Arabs in the Maghreb. Umayyad Caliph Hisham ibn Abd al-Malik swore that he would send a large army and added "I will not leave a single Berber compound without pitching beside it a tent of a tribesman from Qays or Tamim". During this time, the majority of Maghrebi Arabs were Qahtanites from South Arabia.

=== 8th–9th centuries ===
During the rule of the Abbasid Caliphate, there was a great influx of Khurasani Arabs from Iraq to the Maghreb. These were mostly North Arabian tribes, among them was the Najdi tribe of Banu Tamim. This shifted the tribal balance of Ifriqiya in favor of the North Arabian Adnanite tribes who became the majority, to the detriment of the formerly more numerous South Arabian Qahtanite tribes.

During the rule of the Aghlabid dynasty (founded in 800), Arab migration to increased in numbers due to the anti-Kharijite wars. The number of Arab migrants of Ifriqiya concentrated in the army and the cities, mainly Kairouan, has been estimated at 100,000. Most of the Arab migrants came from Syria and Iraq, which from the start supplied numerous migrants to the Maghreb. The organization of the Aghlabid army was largely based on the Arab tribes who settled in Ifriqiya in the late seventh and eighth centuries. These troops were called the jund, descendants of Arab tribesmen who participated in the Muslim conquest of the Maghreb. In 789, descendant of Ali ibn Abi Talib, Idris ibn Abdallah, fled from the Hejaz and arrived in Tangier after the failed revolt against the Abbasids in the Battle of Fakhkh. He founded the Idrisid dynasty, which established control over modern-day Morocco and western Algeria. The Idrisid dynasty played an important role in the early Islamization of the area, and contributed to an increase in Arab migration and Arabization in major urban centers of the western Maghreb. Several Shia Arabs rapidly flocked to Fez, Arabizing the region. Fez experienced large waves of Arab migration, including one which involved 800 Arabs from Al-Andalus in 818 and one which involved 2,000 Arab families from Ifriqiya in 824.

These Arab political entities, in addition to the Salihids and Fatimids, were influential in encouraging Arabization by attracting Arab migrants and by promoting Arab culture. In addition, disturbances and political unrest in the Mashriq compelled the Arabs to migrate to the Maghreb in search of security and stability. By this time, there were several Arab tribes in the Maghreb, including Azd, Lakhm, Judham, Ghassan, Mudar, Rabi'a, Qahtan, Banu Adi, Quda'a, Banu Hashim, Banu Asad and Banu Tamim.

=== 11th century ===
The 11th century witnessed the most significant wave of Arab migration, surpassing all previous movements. This event unfolded when the Zirid dynasty of Ifriqiya proclaimed its independence from the Fatimid Caliphate of Egypt. In retribution against the Zirids, the Fatimids dispatched large Bedouin Arab tribes, mainly the Banu Hilal and Banu Sulaym, to defeat the Zirids and settle in the Maghreb. These tribes followed a nomadic lifestyle and were originally from the Hejaz and Najd.

To persuade the Banu Hilal and Banu Sulaym to migrate to the Maghreb, the Fatimid caliph gave each tribesman a camel and money and helped them cross from the east to the west bank of the Nile river. The severe drought in Egypt at the time also persuaded these tribes to migrate to the Maghreb, which had a better economic situation at the time. The Fatimid caliph instructed them to rule the Maghreb instead of the Zirid emir Al-Mu'izz and told them "I have given you the Maghrib and the rule of al-Mu'izz ibn Balkīn as-Sanhājī the runaway slave. You will want for nothing." and told Al-Mu'izz "I have sent you horses and put brave men on them so that God might accomplish a matter already enacted".

According to Ibn Khaldun, they were accompanied by their wives, children and stock. They settled in the Maghreb after repeatedly fighting battles against the Berbers, such as the Battle of Haydaran. The Zirids abandoned Kairouan to take refuge on the coast where they survived for a century. The Banu Hilal and Banu Sulaym spread on the high plains of Constantine where they gradually obstructed the Qal'at Bani Hammad as they had done to Kairouan a few decades ago. From there, they gradually gained control over the high plains of Algiers and Oran. In the second half of the 12th century, they went to the Moulouya valley and the Atlantic coast in the western Maghreb to areas such as Doukkala.

They heavily transformed the culture of the Maghreb into Arab culture, and spread nomadism in areas where agriculture was previously dominant. It played a major role in spreading Bedouin Arabic to rural areas such as the countryside and steppes, and as far as the southern areas near the Sahara. In addition, they destroyed the Berber Zirid state and most of its cities, sparing only the Mediterranean coastal strip at al-Mahdiyya, and deeply weakened the neighboring Hammadid dynasty and the Zenata. Their influx was a major factor in the linguistic, cultural, genetic and ethnic Arabization of the Maghreb. According to Ibn Khaldun, the lands ravaged by Banu Hilal invaders had become desertified and turned into completely arid desert. The journey of Banu Hilal is recounted in the Arabic oral poem of Sirat Bani Hilal.

Sources estimated that the total number of Arab nomads who migrated to the Maghreb in the 11th century was at around 1 million Arabs.

=== 12th–14th centuries ===
To weaken resistance by Arab tribes in Ifriqiya, the Almohad ruler Abd al-Mu'min transferred them to Morocco in large numbers and settled them in the Atlantic plains. The region was formerly inhabited by the Barghawata tribal group, however this area was largely destroyed and depopulated by the Almoravids in their war against the heretic Barghawata, and it was depopulated again by an Almohad expedition in 1149–1150 and again in 1197–1198 to suppress revolts against them in the region. The Almohads helped the Arab tribes to pass the barriers of Atlas mountains, and accelerated their expansion to Morocco to complete the nomadic Bedouin predominance over the lowlands of the Maghreb as far as the Atlantic coastal plains. These moves also had the corollary effect of advancing the Arabisation of future Morocco. They were specifically settled into the Atlantic plains of Morocco which was previously depopulated by the Almohads. Without the Almohad recruitment of Arabs and resettling into the Atlantic plains, Morocco would have avoided the rural Arabisation that came with the Hilalian migrations into the Maghreb. The appearance of the Arabs added to the complexity of the ethnic population of Morocco and introduced a significant non-Berber element. They increasingly played an important role in the politics of the Almohad Empire. The Almohad ruler Abd al-Mu'min expected opposition from the Masmuda to whom he was a stranger, so he gained Arab support to secure the succession of his son. With the decline of the Almohad army, the Arabs became the most powerful force in the Moroccan plains, and no ruler could have held authority there without their support. The later 'Alawite dynasty came to power in the 17th century with the help of these Arab tribes, who they mobilized against the powerful Berber principality of Dila'iyyah. The Berbers who previously inhabited these plains were either Arabized or displaced to nearby mountains. There was also a significant amount of Arab and Berber intermarriage which led to the spread of Arabic language and restructuring of tribal structures. These plains are inhabited today by the descendants of these Arab tribes known as the ʕroubiya – a name that literally means "Bedouins".

During the Almoravid and Almohad eras, Arabs were very prevalent and overrepresented among the awliya in the Far Maghreb. From a sample of 316 saints, 41% (129 cases) were Arabs - a percentage higher than the proportion of Arabs in the Far Maghreb. This was partly due to how Islamization would lead to the transmission of Arabic culture. Furthermore, 67.5% of the native born Fasis were Arab reflecting how Arabization would occur when families migrates to North African cities.

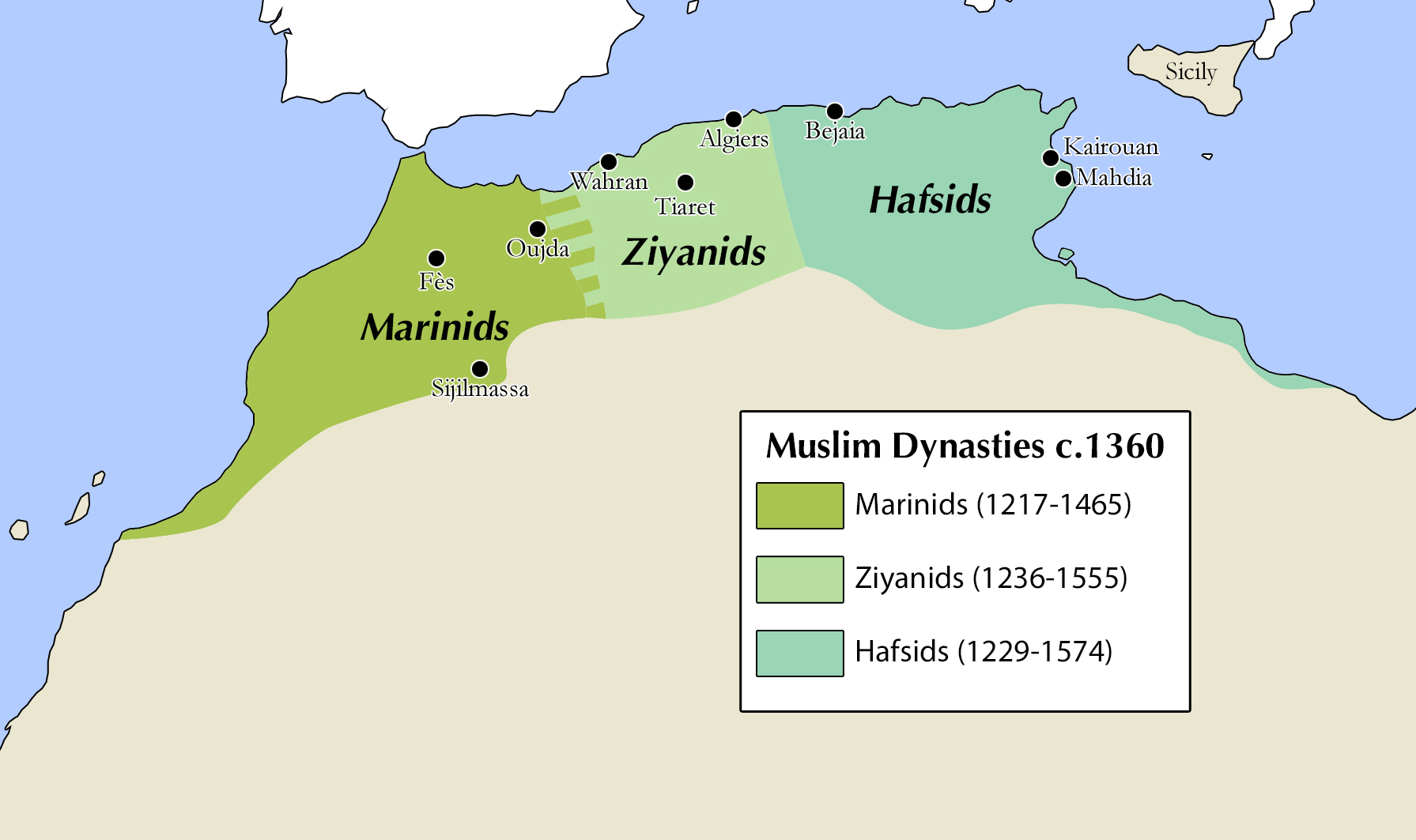
The Maghreb in the 14th century

Under the Marinids, the Arabs grew in importance in Morocco. Due to the lack of Zenata supporters, they welcomed the support of Arab nomads, like the Khlout and Sufyan, who already began to penetrate into the country under the Almohads. The Zenata were heavily assimilated into Arab culture and the Marinid Makhzan (government) composed of both Arabs and Zenata. This led to the expansion of Arab tribes into Morocco where they settled in the plains, and many Berber groups were Arabized. Under the Marinids, Arabic became both the common and official language. The Marinids, as Arabophiles, encouraged the spread of Arab culture by incorporating Arab cultural practices into their court and family traditions and by marrying the daughters of Arab leaders like prominent sharifs and Bedouin leaders from clans like the Banū Muhalhal of the Khlout. The Marinids claimed descent from the Arab tribe of Mudar. Like the Marinids, the Zayyanid dynasty of the Kingdom of Tlemcen relied on a makhzan of Arab and Berber tribes. One of these Arab tribes was the Beni Amer. Furthermore, a sub-clan of the Zayyanids, the Banū al-Qāsim, claimed an Idrisid descent and also regularly married the daughters of prominent Arab figures.

=== 13th–15th centuries ===
The Ma'qilis also entered the Maghreb during this wave of Arabian tribal immigration in the 11th century. They later allied with the Banu Hilal and entered under their protection. They adapted to the climatic desert conditions of the Maghreb, discovering the same way of life as in the Arabian Peninsula. In the 13th century, they occupied southern Algeria and dominated the oases of Tuat and Gourara. At this point, the Maqil group disintegrated into different populations in the Maghreb and had given rise to the Beni Hassan along with other related groups. The Beni Hassan expanded southwest and occupied Sanhaja lands in the 13th century after invading and defeating the Berber confederation, and the Sanhaja has long had to pay tribute to the Bedouin invaders. They also dominated the valleys of the Moulouya, Draa, Sous, and the Tafilalt oasis region. Moroccan historian Mohamed Kably characterized the 15th century as the "Ma'qil era" of Moroccan history because of their political influence.

The Char Bouba War in modern day Western Sahara and Mauritania from 1644 to 1674, which after decades of confrontations ended up completely Arabizing the native Berber population, destroying their language and culture and giving rise to the contemporary Sahrawi people. Harry Norris noted "the Moorish Sahara is the western extremity of the Arab World. Western it certainly is, some districts further west than Ireland, yet in its way of life, its culture, its literature and in many of its social customs, it has much in common with the heart lands of the Arab East, in particular with the Hijaz and Najd and parts of the Yemen".

=== 15th–17th centuries ===
Starting from the late 15th century, a new wave of Arabs arrived as refugees from Al-Andalus in response to the persecution they faced under Christian Spanish rule after the fall of Granada in the Reconquista in 1492. In 1609, Spain implemented the Expulsion of the Moriscos, which aimed to forcibly remove all Muslims from the Iberian Peninsula, expelling about 275,000 to 300,000 of them. Accustomed to urban life, they settled in urban cities in the Maghreb, including Fez, Rabat and Tangiers in Morocco, Tlemcen and Constantine in Algeria, Kairouan, Tunis and Bizerte in Tunisia. They brought with them the urban dialects of Andalusi Arabic, which they introduced to the existing Bedouin Arabic dialects of the Maghreb. This event greatly increased the process of Arabization in the Maghreb from the 15th to the 17th century. There were several Arab tribes in Al-Andalus, of which the most prominent were Qays, Kilab, Uqayl, Mudar, Rabi'a, Yaman, Tayy, Lakhm, Judham, Amilah, and Quda'a.

Three elite Arab groups emerged in Morocco, during the time of the Wattasid dynasty. First, old Andalusian families going back to the 9th century, important in trade and administration, contributed to the ulama and qadis. Second, there were tribal qaids who were recruited from guich tribes who made up Morocco's main military force. Finally, there were the shurfa who claimed direct descent from Muhammad with their descent recognised by the sultan through a dahir and were believed to possess baraka. These included older Idrisid families, some Berber clans who claimed the title and newer shurfa who were associated with the Arab tribes that settled in the south of Morocco in the 12th and 13th century. Their status was most prestigious in the Bilad es-Siba. Sharifism, as an ideology, became especially popular in this period.

From the 16th century, Morocco saw the rise of two Arab dynasties of Sharifian descent: the Saadis and the Alaouites. These dynasties managed to gain power through support from allied Arab tribes. The Saadis mainly received support from Maqil Arabs from the Draa valley and the Anti-Atlas They used these tribes to counter Hilalian groups. The Alaouites got support from Arab and Berber tribes in the Tafilalt and Angad.

In Algeria, ever since the decline of the Hafsids, Biskra and Zab was ruled over by the Dhawawida. In the Regency of Algiers, Biskra was the seat of the Shaykh al-ʿArab (Shaykh of the Arabs) whom the exercise of day-to-day authority in the pre-Sahara fell on. The Shaykh commanded seven Arab tribes and had administrative authority over sedentary oasis population in the region stretching from the Zibans to the Touggourt. This office, from the mid 16th century, became dominated by the Bu ʿUkkaz - a Hilalian family.

=== 17th–19th centuries ===
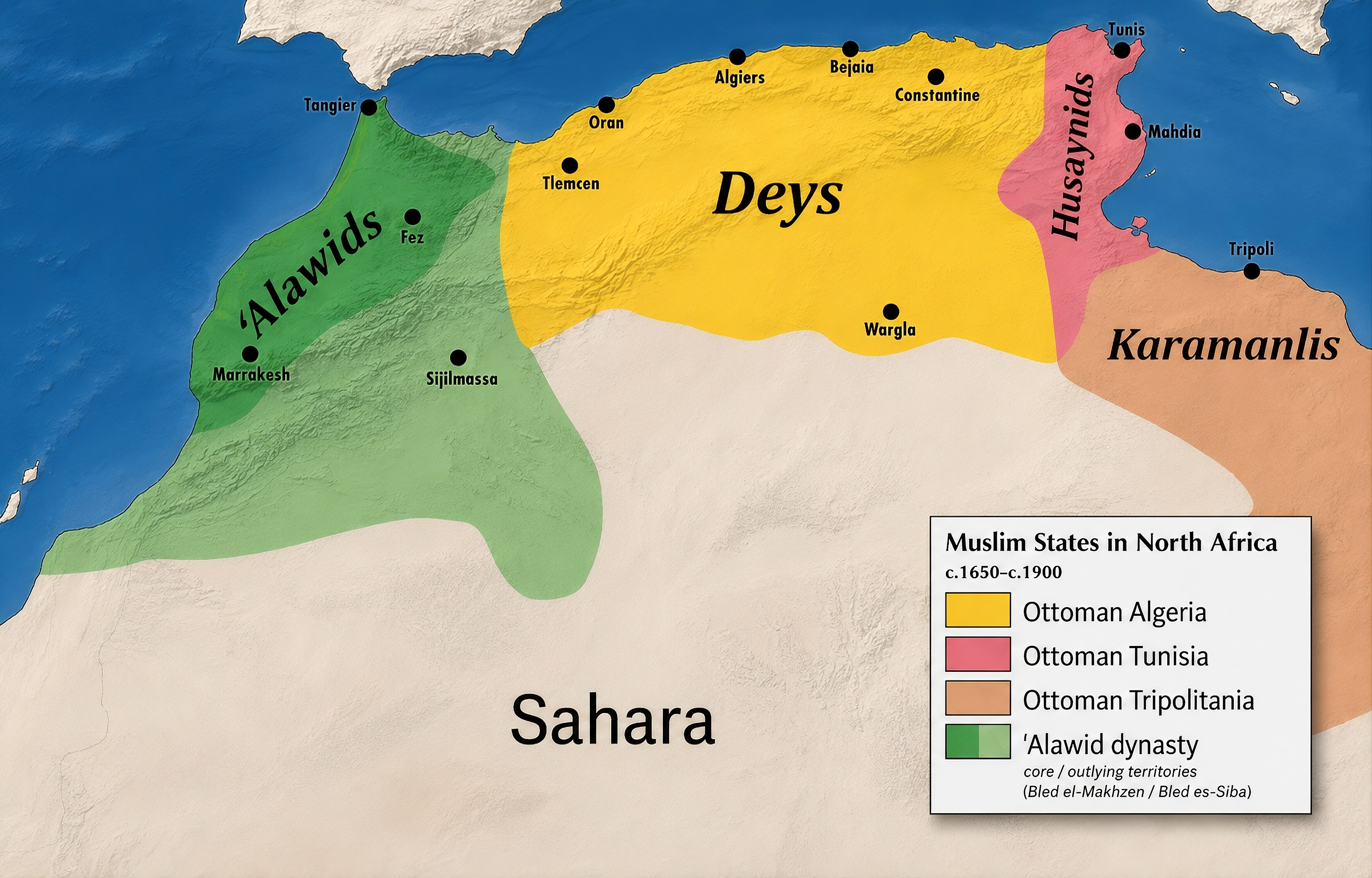
Approximate territories of the states of the Maghreb in the late 17th to 19th centuries

Ismail ibn Sharif of the Alaouite dynasty recruited Arab tribes from the Sahara as well as using Maqil groups inherited from the Saadians. The four makhzen tribes that formed the guich tribes in Morocco were the Sheraga (Awlād Djamaʿ, Hawwāra, Banū ʿĀmir, Banū Snūs, Sedjʿa, Aḥlāf, Swīd, etc.), the Sherārda (Shabana, Zirāra, Awlād Djerār, Ahl Sūs, Awlād Mṭāʿ, etc.), the Udāya (the Udāya proper, Mgafra etc.) and Bwākher. After Ismail ibn Sharif died, the guich tribes became king makers. In the span of 31 years from 1726 to 1757, they deposed, enthroned and slayed 14 sultans. This was until Moulay Ismail's grandson Mohammed ben Abdallah who managed to keep these tribes under control. For example, to counterbalance the power of the Sherarda in Tadla and the plain of Marrakesh, he recruited sections from the tribes from this plain in the Makhzen like the Mnābeha, Rḥāmna, ʿAbda, Aḥmar and Harbil. Each of these tribes had to send two qaids to the guich.

The Bey of Constantine, Salah Bey, promoted the Banu Ghana to the post of Shaykh al-ʿArab and their rivalry with the Bu ʿUkkaz lasted until the French conquest of Algeria. The Turks alternated between who they supported to divide and rule.

=== 19th-20th centuries ===
When France invaded Algeria, Emir Abdelkader had support from several Arab tribes in his resistance against the French conquest and his attempt to create a state with these tribes forming his base. Abdelkader himself was a sharif who claimed descent from Muhammad through Idris I of Morocco. Three major tribes in Algeria declared Abdelkader as "Sultan of the Arabs".

== Language ==
Geographical distribution of the varieties of Arabic

Maghrebi Arabs speak local dialects of Arabic. Arabic was introduced to the Maghreb by the early wave of migration prior to the 11th century, which contributed to the Berber adoption of Arab culture. The Arabic language spread during this period and drove Latin into extinction in the cities. The Arabization took place around Arab centres through the influence of Arabs in the cities and rural areas surrounding them. The migration of Banu Hilal and Banu Sulaym in the 11th century played a major role in spreading Bedouin Arabic to rural areas such as the countryside and steppes, and as far as the southern areas near the Sahara, as well as heavily transforming the culture of the Maghreb into Arab culture, and spreading Bedouin nomadism in areas where agriculture was previously dominant.

The Bedouin dialects in the Maghreb, commonly known as Hilalian dialects, are spoken in various regions, including the Atlantic plains in Morocco, the High Plains and Sahara regions in Algeria, the Sahel in Tunisia, and the regions of Tripolitania and Cyrenaica in Libya. The Bedouin dialects can be classified into four primary varieties: Sulaymi dialects (Libya and southern Tunisia), Eastern Hilalian dialects (central Tunisia and eastern Algeria), Central Hilalian dialects (south and central Algeria), Ma'qili dialects (western Algeria and Morocco) and Hassaniya dialects (Mauritania, Western Sahara and southern Morocco; also classified as Maqil). In Morocco, Bedouin Arabic dialects are spoken in plains and in recently founded cities such as Casablanca. Thus, the city Arabic dialect shares with the Bedouin dialects gal 'to say' (qala); they also represent the bulk of modern urban dialects, such as those of Oran and Algiers. There are also the Pre-Hilalian dialects, which existed before the Hilalian migration and are sedentary dialects spoken in cities and the areas around the cities that were Arabized early on. These are divided into two main groups: the Eastern pre-Hilalian dialects spoken in Libya, Tunisia and Eastern Algeria and the Western pre-Hilalian dialects spoken in western Algeria and Morocco.

== Demographics ==
Today, the Arabs make up the majority of the population of the countries of the Maghreb, comprising 70% to 80% of Algeria, 92% to 97% of Libya, 67% to 70% of Morocco and 98% of Tunisia.

=== Religion ===
The vast majority of the inhabitants of the Maghreb adhere to Sunni Islam and its Maliki school. The Maghreb had undergone a process of Malikization in the 11th and 12th centuries, which gradually marginalized Shia and Kharijite forms of Islam and encouraged the adoption of the Maliki madhab, a more conservative and mainstream form of Sunni Islam. By the mid-tenth century, Kharijism died out in North Africa. The Maghreb historically had a large Shia Arab population, such as the Zaydi Idrisids and the Bedouin tribes of Banu Hilal and Banu Sulaym that emigrated to the Maghreb. Albeit, the vast majority converted to Maliki Sunni Islam in the later centuries.

=== Arab tribes ===
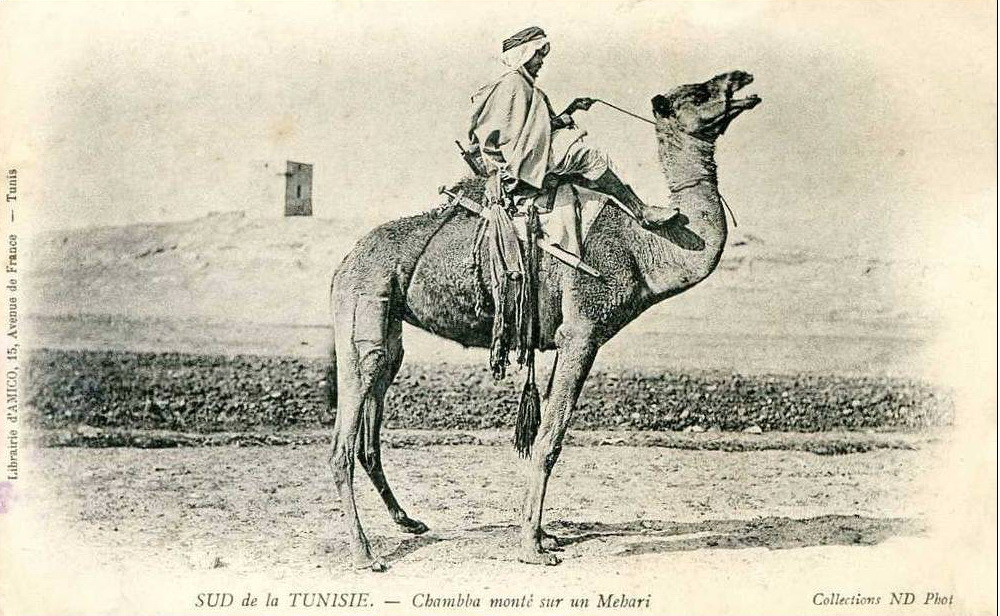
Chaamba tribesman riding a camel in southern Tunisia, c. 1934.

The Arabian tribes that settled in the Maghreb emerged into several contemporary sub-tribes. The most notable Arab tribes of Morocco include Abda, Ahl Rachida, Azwafit, Banu Ma'qil, Banu Tamim, Beni Ahsen, Beni 'Amir, Beni Guil, Beni Ḥassān, Banu Hilal, Beni Khirane, Beni Mathar, Beni Moussa, Banu Sulaym, Beni Zemmour, Chaouia, Doukkala, Hyayna, Khlout, Mzab, Oulad Delim, Oulad Tidrarin, Oulad Zyan, Rahamna, Sless, Zaër, Zyayda. There are several tribes of Bedouin origin throughout Tunisia, such as Banu Hudhayl and Shammar, however they are not very nomadic nowadays and they mostly live in towns. The major Arab tribes in Libya are Qadhadhfa, Magarha, Warfalla, Firjan, Saʿada and Murabtin, Masamir, Zuwayya, Awlad Busayf, Awlad Sulayman and Abaydat. The most well known Arab tribes of Algeria are Chaamba, Dhouaouda, Doui-Menia, Ghenanma, Beni Hassan, Ouled Djerir, Awlad Sidi Shaykh, Banu Tamim, Banu Hilal, Banu Sulaym, Thaaliba, Ouled Nail, Beni Amer, Hamyan and many more. Bedouin tribes in Algeria primarily live in the Algerian Desert.

==== Morocco ====
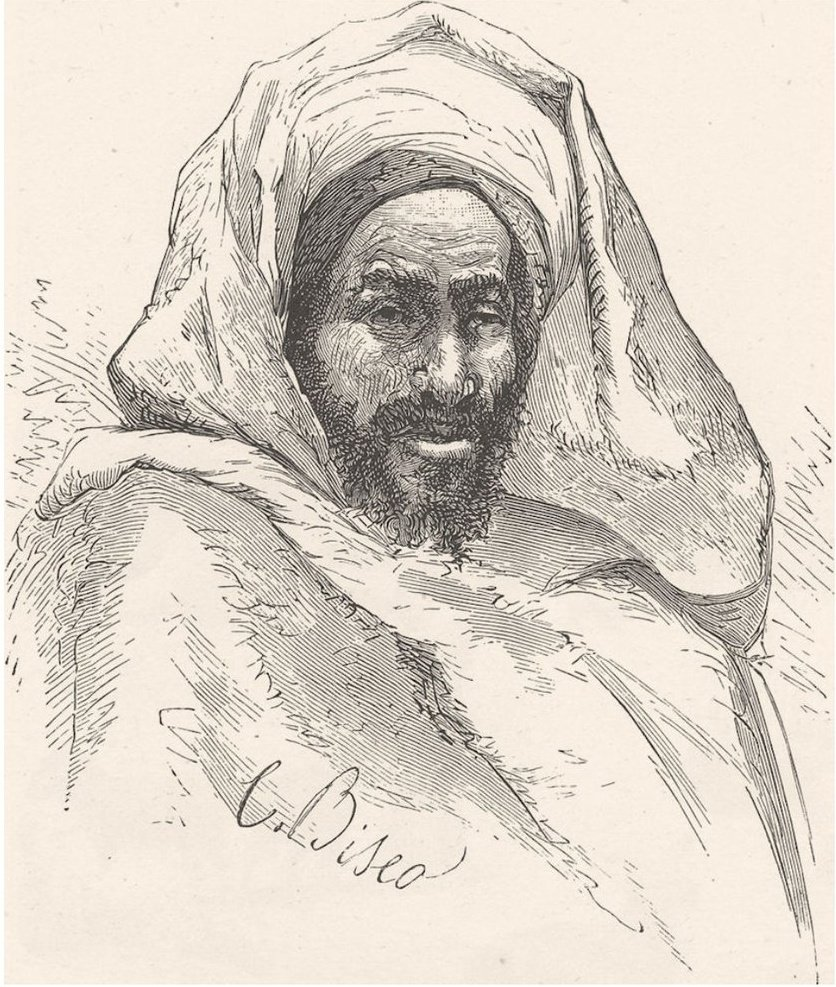
A man from the Beni Ahsen by Edmondo de Amicis

- Azwafit
- Ahl Rachida, an Arab tribe, also referred to as Ouled Sidi Yaakoub. The tribe can trace its lineage to the Islamic prophet Muhammad through his grandson, Hasan ibn Ali.
- Hyayna, an Arab tribe whose origin dates back to the immigration of a part of Banu Amer Ibn Zoghba (Banu Hilal) after having joined Muhammad ash-Sheykh in exchange for land and becoming a Guich tribe (an army tribe) in the end of the 16th century and the beginning of the 17th century from the West of Algeria until Morocco (North East of Fez)
- Hamyan
- Rhamna
- Abda, an Arab tribe whose origin dates back to the arrival of the Beni Maqil tribe at the end of the Merinid era. Historian Eugene Aubin wrote: "the Abda are a powerful tribe, thirty-five-thousand strong, of pure Arab race, they occupy a fertile territory, rich in horses and cattle. It is one of five quasi-Makhzen tribes of Morocco." It consists of three branches, Bhatra, Rabiaa and Ouled Amer.
- Beni Ahsen, an Arab tribe, part of Beni Maqil. They settled in the Missour and Almis area around the 16th century, and migrated northwest of the Sefrou region in the 17th century. In the 18th century they were pushed west by the Zemmour tribe, which had migrated north from the south. Today they are located in the region of Rabat and the Atlantic coast.
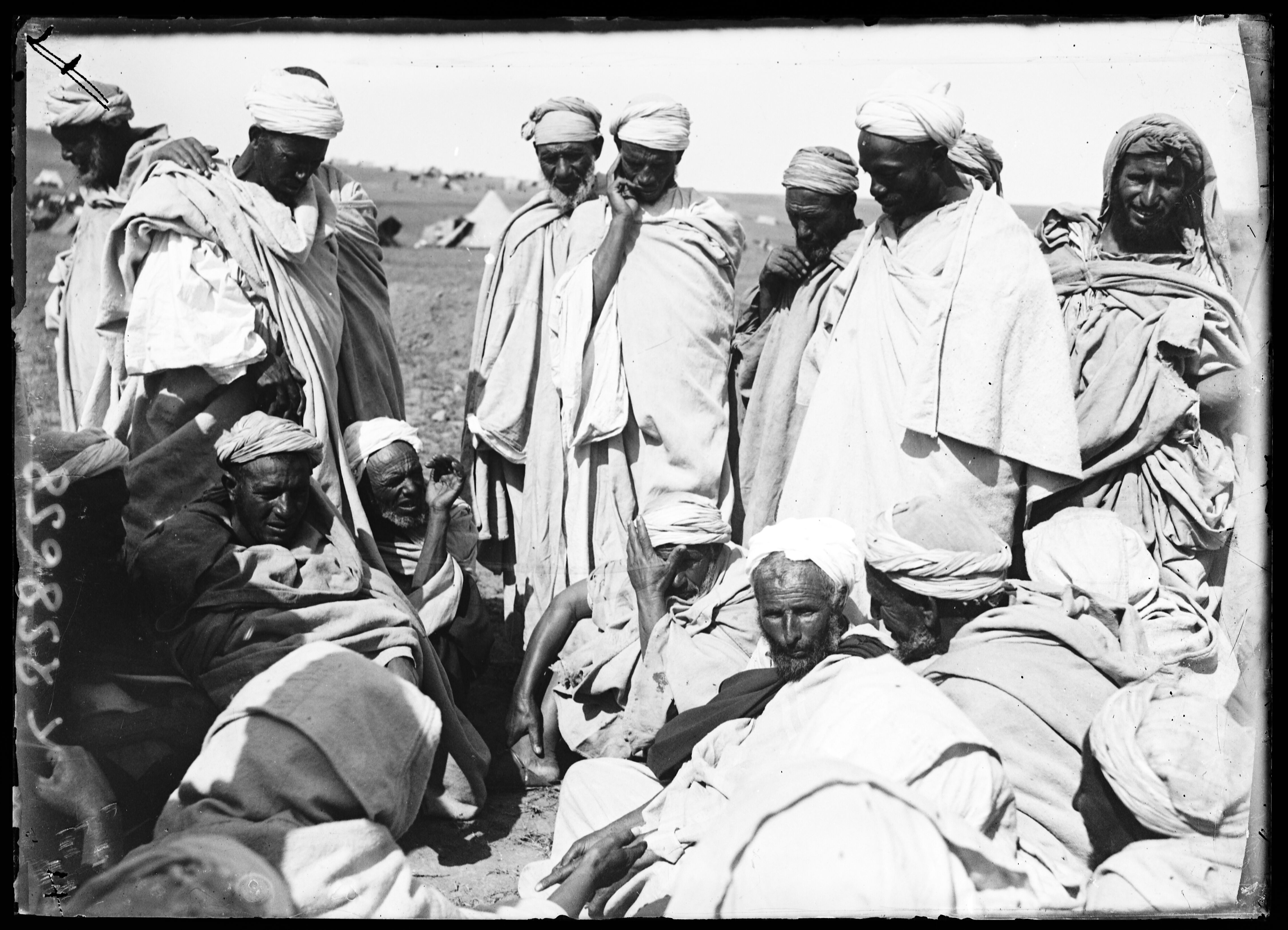
  Men of the Beni Amir forced to submit after the fighting at Kasba Tadla, c. 1913
- Beni Amir
- Beni Guil, an Arab tribe that can trace its lineage to the prophet's grandson, Hasan ibn Ali. In the 10th century their ancestors were given the right to graze in eastern and western Morocco by the Fatimid ruler Al-Mu'izz li-Din Allah.
- Beni Mathar
- Beni Hassan
- Maqil
- Beni Khirane
- Beni Zemmour

== Culture ==
Unlike other conquerors of the Maghreb, the Arab Muslim conquerors of the seventh and eighth centuries impacted the culture much more heavily. The later large scale Arab tribal migrations of the eleventh and twelfth century accelerated the Arabization process and heavily transformed the culture of the Maghreb into Arab culture, spreading nomadism in areas where agriculture was previously dominant. Despite centuries of intermixing between indigenous populations and Arabs, Arabs in North Africa trace their ancestry to Arab tribes from the Arabian Peninsula.

=== Traditions ===
==== Morocco ====
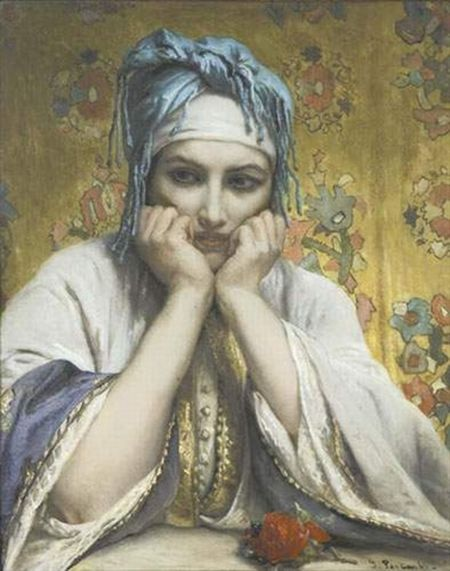
19th century depiction of an Arab woman from Tangier by Jean-François Portaels

Moroccan women traditionally wear copious amounts of jewelry on their neck, arms, head and ears. Preferably, the jewelry should be made from pure gold as this signifies that the family is economically well-off. The jewelry tends to be decorated with different jewels like rubies, olivines, Andalucian beads, pearls and diamonds. The olivines and the pearls are traditionally used in most Maghrebi jewelry. The olivine represents female beauty, and was historically associated with the pre-Islamic goddesses of the Arabian pantheon. The pearls used in the jewelry represent wealth and fortune.

Brides in Morocco adorn themselves in extensive amounts of jewelry, the amount of jewelry depends on the economic status of the family. Different regions in Morocco have different types of traditional jewelry. Brides in the region of Tanger-Tetouan add pearls to their traditional jewelry, whereas brides in the region of Fes add pheridot jewels and gold. In the Sahara, gold and coloured beads are added to the outfit. Families that can't afford to buy jewelry rent it for the occasion.

The headdresses used in the ceremony also tend to differ depending on the region. The northern region of Morocco, (Tanger-Tetouan), use a striped and glittery fabric to cover the bride's head. A headpiece in either silver or gold (depending on the region) is placed over the fabrics and is sometimes decorated with jewels. In the central region, Fes-Meknes, a decorated dark green and golden fabric is used, over it a golden headpiece is placed, decorated with dark green pheridot jewels and pearls hanging down over the face. In the southern region, Western Sahara, the women wear a headpiece decorated with gold pieces and coloured beads that differ from tribe to tribe. The bride's head is covered with a black fabric.

=== Cuisine ===
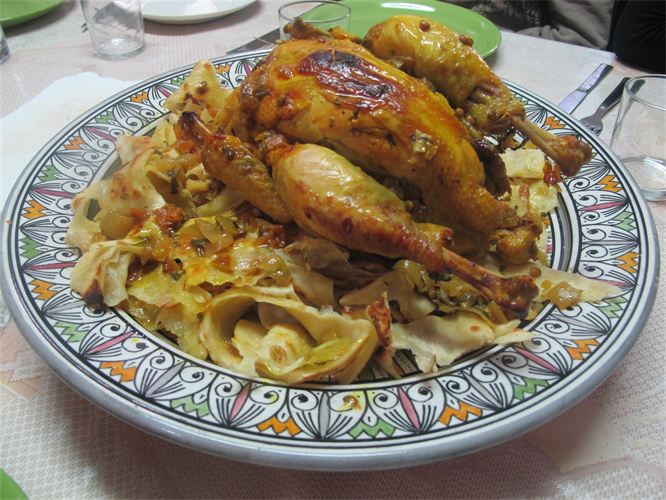
Rfissa descends from tharid - originally a peasant dish in the Middle East that transformed into a dish of higher status in Al-Andalus.

Arabs in the Maghreb have heavily influenced the cuisine of the Maghreb, which is now a blend of Arabian, Mediterranean and Berber cuisines, with historic influences from Ottoman and European cuisines. Dishes include Tharid, Chermoula, Harira, Pastilla, Rfissa, Tangia, Seffa, Mechoui, Shorba, Shakshouka, Assidat Zgougou, Brik, Fricasse, Harissa, Lablabi, and Bazin.

== See also ==
- Arab world
- Arab-Berber
- Moroccans
- Algerians
- Maghrebis
