= Beni Zemmour =

Arab tribe descendant of Banu Hilal

Beni Zemmour is an Arab tribe descendant of Banu Hilal. It is part of the Tadla confederacy.

== Composition ==
Although the zawiya had the merit of fostering the emergence and continuity of the tribal gathering of the Beni Zemmour, it nevertheless remained fragmented, lacking unity and cohesion. It existed in the form of independent and autonomous tribal groups, connected to other groups — whether Beni Zemmour, ouardigha, or Berber — through ties based primarily on shared interests, particularly grazing and production. These connections were maintained within the framework of agreements (tata) concluded at the sanctuary of one of the righteous figures at Abu al-Jaad.

=== Formation and Structure of the Confederation ===
Although the zawiya played a significant role in fostering the emergence and continuity of the tribal gathering of the Beni Zemmour, the confederation itself remained fragmented and lacked strong internal cohesion. Rather than forming a unified tribal entity based on blood ties, it consisted of independent and autonomous groups connected tho Ouardigha confederation, particularly grazing and agricultural production. These relationships were regulated through agreements known as tata, often concluded at the sanctuary of one of the righteous figures in Abu al-Jaad.

The name “Beni Zemmour” appears to have originally designated one of the Arab nomadic tribes of Tadla, which migrated seasonally between mountainous and plain regions. Over time, the term came to describe a broader tribal confederation composed of groups of diverse origins. This confederation settled in a marginal and relatively infertile zone situated between the foothills of the Middle Atlas to the east and the lands of Ouardigha to the west. Initially used as grazing land by mountain Berber populations, the area was later shared with a branch of the Ouardigha, this tribe imprint is reflected in several local toponyms within the Beni Zemmour territory, such as Ta Khazrit, Boukroum, and TaSharaft.

== Formation and Structure of the Beni Zemmour Confederation ==
Although the zawiya played a significant role in fostering the emergence and continuity of the tribal gathering of the Beni Zemmour, the confederation itself remained fragmented and lacked strong internal cohesion. Rather than forming a unified tribal entity based on blood ties, it consisted of independent and autonomous groups connected through shared economic interests, particularly grazing and agricultural production. These relationships were regulated through agreements known as tata, often concluded at the sanctuary of one of the righteous figures in Abu al-Jaad.

The name “Beni Zemmour” appears to have originally designated one of the Arab nomadic tribes of Tadla, which migrated seasonally between mountainous and plain regions. Over time, the term came to describe a broader tribal confederation composed of groups of diverse origins. This confederation settled in a marginal and relatively infertile zone situated between the foothills of the Middle Atlas to the east and the lands of Wardigha to the west. Initially used as grazing land by mountain Berber populations, the area was later shared with a branch of the Ouardigha tribe. This tribe imprint is reflected in several local toponyms within the Beni Zemmour territory, such as Ta Khazrit, Boukroum, and Ta Sharaft.

=== relations ===
Due to their geographical position, these tribes were frequently exposed to raids from surrounding mountain groups, particularly during periods marked by weak or absent central authority. The tribal movements originating in the mountains during the eighteenth century significantly altered the region’s demographic and political balance. Some groups were pushed north of Abi al-Jaad toward the southern limits of the central plateau, while new tribal elements infiltrated the area, further complicating internal divisions. This situation was characteristic of the tribes surrounding the zawiya, distinguishing them from other tribes of Tadla, and contributed to their structural weakness and reliance on contractual alliances rather than genealogical solidarity.

=== Tribal affiliation ===
In historical and regional accounts, the Beni Zemmour are considered to be part of the Wardigha tribal grouping. This classification appears to stem from For economic reasons and as security, the Beni Zemmour were part of the Ouardigha confederation, and from genealogical origins.

Over time, territorial integration, shared pasturelands, and intertribal agreements contributed to the perception of the Beni Zemmour as belonging to, or closely associated with, the Wardigha confederation. Such affiliations were often fluid in the Tadla region, where tribal identity could reflect political alliances and economic cooperation as much as lineage.

== See also ==
- Tadla
- Beni Hassan
- Beni Ahsen
- Rahamna
- Maqil
