= Algerian Arab =

Algerian Arab may refer to:

- Algerian Arab, also known as an Maghrebi Arab – someone of Arab descent in Algeria and the Maghreb
- Algerian Arab, a reference to the Algerian Arabic language (as in "Algerian Arab literature")
- Algerian Arab sheep, a breed of domestic livestock
