= Ahl Rachida =

Arabian tribe

The Ahl Rachida (Arabic: أهل رشيدة) is an Arabian tribe, also called Ouled Sidi Yaakoub. The tribe is also of Shorfa origin, which means they are descendant of the Islamic prophet. This tribe had a significant cultural and artistic influence in the area.

According to writings Ahl Rechida down from Beni Rached, originating in Mazouna in Algeria; after a period marked by political unrest, they entered the service of Marinids (13th century) for permission to settle in Morocco.

== See also ==
- Arab tribes
- North African Arabs
- Maghreb
- Jebala people

=== Other tribes ===
- Zaër
- Abda
- Beni Hassan
- Maqil
- Beni Khirane
