= Azwafit =

The Azwafit or Azwafayt (Arabic: أزوفيت, romanized: Azwāfīt) is a Sahrawi tribe of Bedouin Arab origin.

== Etymology ==
The word "Azwafit" (Arabic: أزوفيت) is derived from the Arabic word "zfata", means "To protect from the Zfata". The Zfata is a group of people which claim false payments for the transportation of goods.

== About ==
The Azwafit are part of the greater Tekna confederation. Azwafit is a tribe which was accustomed to escort and protect caravans against the payment of "Ztata" or "Zfata", where the name Azwafit comes from. Because they became part of a bigger Berber tribe, the Arab subtribes are partially Berberised and speak Berber today.

The writer La Chapelle noted that Azwafits counted the following fractions: Ait Ahmed Ou Ali, Ahl Hayin, Mhamd Ait Ait El Khennous, Ait Messaoud Ait Boukko and Ida Ou Louggan.

== See also ==
- North African Arabs
- Idrissid
- Beni Hassan
- Maqil
- Beni Khirane
