= Beni Moussa =

Moroccan tribe of Hilali-Arab descent

Beni Moussa (Arabic: بني موسى) is a Moroccan tribe of Hilali-Arab descent. It is part of the Tadla confederacy.

== See also ==
- Morocco
- Tadla
- Beni Hassan
- Maqil
- Beni Ahsen
