= Abd al-Rahman al-Majdoub =

Moroccan poet, Sufi and mystic (1506–1568)

- عبد الرحمان المجدوب
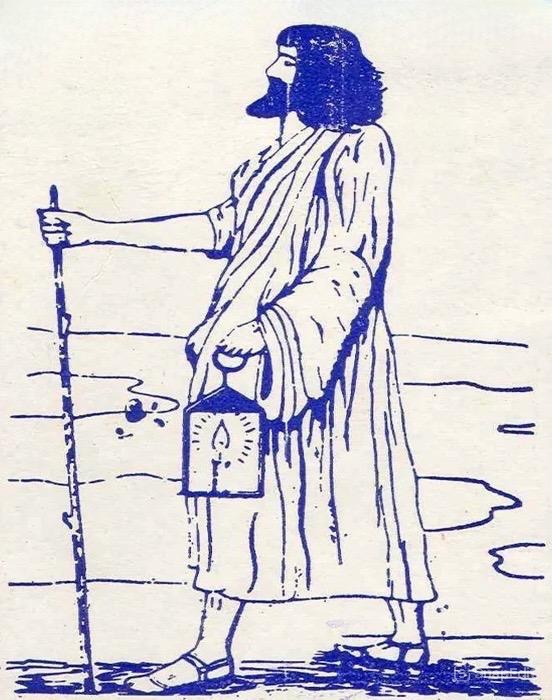

Personal life
- Born: March , 1506 Tit village near Azemmour, Morocco
- Died: 26 May 1568 (aged 62) Marshaqa village, Habt region, Morocco

Religious life
- Religion: Sufi Islam
- Arabic name
- Personal (Ism): ʿAbd al-Raḥmān
- Patronymic (Nasab): ibn ʿAyyad ibn Yaʿqūb ibn Salama ibn Khashshān
- Teknonymic (Kunya): Abū Zayd; Abū Muḥammad
- Epithet (Laqab): al-Majdhūb
- Toponymic (Nisba): al-Ṣanhājī al-Dukkālī al-Farajī

Sidi Abderrahman el Majdoub (Arabic: عبد الرحمان المجدوب, romanized: ʿAbd al-Raḥmān al-Majdhūb, March 1506 – 26 May 1568), also transcribed as Mejdub, full name al-Shaykh Abu Zayd Abderrahman al-Majdoub ibn Ayyad ibn Yaacub ibn Salama ibn Khashan al-Sanhaji al-Dukkali, was a Moroccan poet, Sufi and mystic. Many lines of his poems are known throughout the Maghreb, and his work is the source of many proverbs (e.g. "doubt is the beginning of wisdom").

== Biography ==
Abderrahman was born in March 1506 in the Tit village near Azemmour, Morocco. In 1508, he moved with his father to Irgan near the town of Meknes. He was brought up in a Sufi environment, his father studied under Ibrahim Afham al-Zarhuni, a student of Ahmad Zarruq. Abderrahman studied first in Meknes, then he went to Fez to continue his studies. He studied in Meknes under teachers such as Abu Ruwayin, Ahmad al-Shabih, Said ibn Abi Bakr al-Mishnaza'i, Abd al-Haqq al-Zalliji, Ja'ran as-Sfyani and the qutb Umar al-Khattab al-Zarhuni. It was Umar al-Khattab al-Zarhuni who told him to settle in the habt region. He studied in Fez under teachers such as Ali ibn Ahmad al-Sanhaji. He memorised the entire Quran and the 10 different ways of recitation. He lived during the rise of the Saadi dynasty under the reign of Mohammed ash-Sheikh and Abdallah al-Ghalib. This period also saw the rise of the Ottoman Empire in Algeria and Tunisia.

== His poetry ==
For Abderrahman poetry was about political, moral and social issues. All his poems were collected in a Diwan that provided his mystical views on love, death, emotions, woman, science, education, religion and more. His poetry has become the source of many of the daily proverbs used in Moroccan society.

Abderrahman died on 26 May 1568 in the Marshaqa village in the habt region. As requested by his will, he was buried in Meknes on 29 May 1568, near the Aissa gate, where later the mausoleum of Moulay Ismail was built. The dome above his tomb was built by his student Abu l-Mahasin Yusuf al-Fasi. The tomb attracts many visitors every day.

== Sources ==
- Belemqeddem, Ruqayya (2004). "al-Majdhub (-Sidi) Abd al-Rahman". In Toufiq, Ahmed (ed.). Ma'lamat al-Maghrib (Encyclopedia of Morocco) (in Arabic). Vol. 20. al-Jamī‘a al-Maghribiyya li-l-Ta’līf wa-l-Tarjama wa-l-Nashr.
- Boum, Aomar (2008). "Abderrahman, El Majdoub". In Akyeampong, Emmanuel K.; Gates, Henry Louis Jr (eds.). Dictionary of African Biography. Oxford University Press. ISBN 978-0-19-538207-5.
