= Beni ʿAmir =

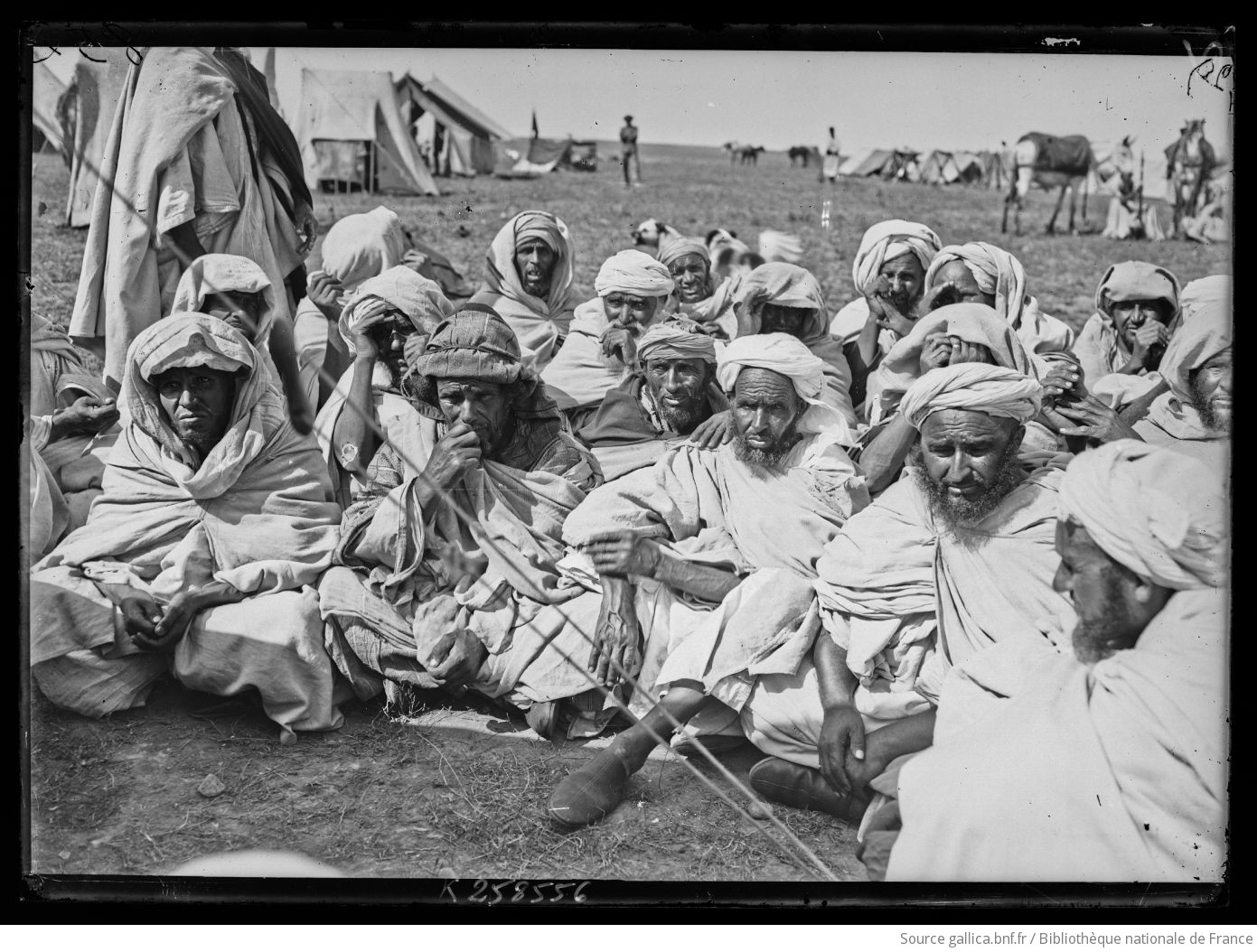
Submission of Beni Amir after the fighting of Kasbah Tadla

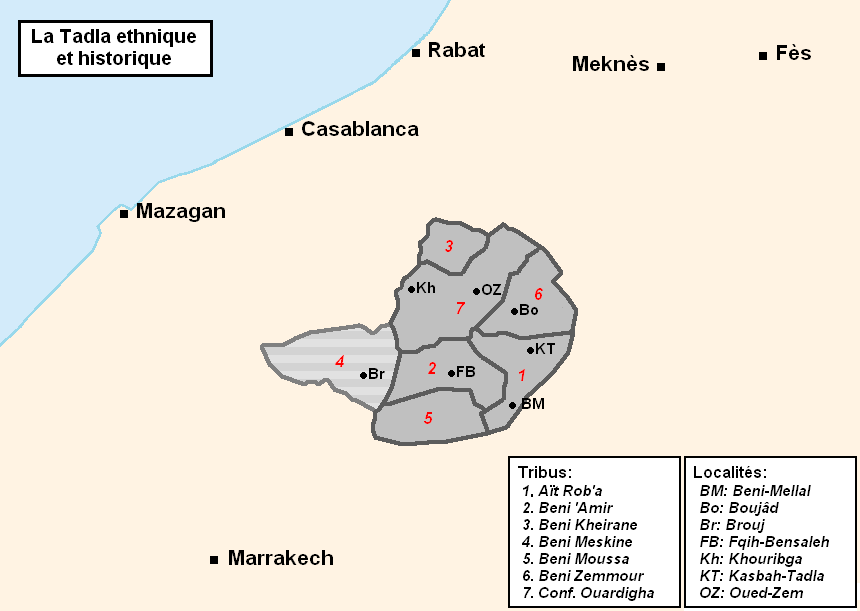
Map of the Tadla tribal confederation

Bani 'Amir (Arabic: بني عمير, romanized: Banī ʿAmīr) is an Arab tribe in Morocco, descended from Jusham. It mainly inhabits the Hilalian city Fquih Ben Salah, Bradia and the surrounding areas in the Tadla tribal confederation. Bani 'Amir settled in Morocco in the 12th century during the reign of Almohad caliph Abd al-Mu'min.

== See also ==
- Morocco
- Tadla
- Beni Hassan
- Maqil
- Beni Ahsen
