= Zaër =

The Zaër (Arabic: زعير, romanized: Zaʿīr) are an Arab tribal confederacy of Maqil origins. For centuries, the Zaër practiced semi-nomadic pastoralism, traveling with the seasons to tend to the tribe's massive herds. The Zaër were divided between two tribal groups, the Kefiane in the west of the Zaër rangeland and the Mzar'a to the east. Despite the separation between the Zaër groups, their shared culture was nonetheless very isolated from other neighboring tribes due to their distinct linguistic, societal, and geographical differences.

According to tribal lore, the Zaër originally formed in what is now modern-day Mauritania, in the Red River region. However, pressure from larger tribes expelled the Zaër from their ancestral home into central Morocco. Following several decades of searching for a permanent home, one of the Zaër's more prominent leaders, Sidi Muhammad bin Ez-Za'ri, finally established the Zaër in the Korifle Gorge region adjacent to the Atlantic coastal plain, an area along in the highlands, the northern edge of the Sahara, and the southern High Atlas. Leo Africanus wrote in the early sixteenth century that they settled in the region of Khenifra, and later continued on to the north to the Rabat region.

The Zaër culture was almost completely demolished in the early twentieth century by the French protectorate in Morocco, which divided up the lands used by the Zaër for grazing and converted it for agricultural purposes. Infrastructure development of roads, highways, and towns for European settlers disrupted grazing routes, preventing the Zaër from making their traditional living. The French also sold land rights of Zaër rangeland to the highest bidder, resulting in thousands of acre of fertile Zaër land being sold to European agriculturalists. While many descendants of the Zaër still exist today, the Zaër are not a recognized ethnic group or tribe by the Moroccan government and do not exist as they did in their previous history.

== Tribal Organization ==
Historically, the Zaër were organized as a loosely-organized nomadic confederacy, composed of a number of bands of tribes spread out over a wide range of territory consisting of over 377,000 hectares of land in central Morocco. The confederacy is composed of two primary tribal groups, or liffs: the Kefiane (English: Gefiane) and the Mzar'a (English: Meza'ra)

The Kefiane liff is settled in the western and southern part of the Confederacy's territory and is made of 7 tribes: Beni Obeid, Slamna, Uled Zeid, Uled Daho, Hlalef, Ruashed, and Mkhalef. The second liff, the Mzar'a, settled in the eastern part of the territory and is made of 6 tribes: Nejda, Uled Ali, Gsisset, Brashua, Uled Ktir, and Uled Khelifa. At their recorded peak, the Kefiane were thought to number at up to 19,200 tribesmen distributed between 3,820 tents, while the slightly larger Mzar'a were thought to have reached up to 21,300 tribesmen among 4,267 tents.

=== Traditional Community Structure ===
The Zaër have always been nomadic pastoralists, traditionally traveling seasonally in small communities, or douars, in search of grazing land for their flocks. During grazing seasons, the Zaër would live in douars of up to a few hundred people, remaining temporarily stationary throughout the rainy seasons; during the dry seasons, the Zaër would constantly migrate in search of grazing lands for their herds. The Zaër, like many nomadic groups, were known for their distinctive black tents, which functioned as the home and hearth for the family units who lived within them.

Within douars, collective ownership was divided among all pastoralists within the tribe, with ownership of lands assumed between all group members. Power and influence among the douars and between bands of groups within the Zaër's territory was determined by the size of the flock and the quality of the grazing land, with the largest flocks earning the douars the most influence among the Zaër groups. In addition to pastoralism, the Zaër were also known for their warlike tendencies, often engaging in frequent clashes with other tribes for influence and control over valuable grazing lands.

Zaër society was also organized along strict gender roles, with men taking on a traditional protectorate role with the expectations of protecting the women, preserving the honor of the family, joining war bands to raid other settlements and towns for goods and resources, and working to ensure the economic security of the family. Zaër women, on the other hand, were traditionally tasked with the general upkeep of the home unit, typically providing fuel and firewood, birthing and raising children, preserving the folklore and history of the Zaër, and maintaining the Zaër community as a whole.

=== Cultural Ties Between Zaër Groups ===
Despite sharing the Zaër cultural identity, the two liffs did not typically interact with each other, often swapping animosities with one another in brief feuds. However, both groups shared distinct cultural similarities that bound them to the Zaër name, distinctly their linguistic, geographical, organizational, and religious makeup.

==== Language ====
The two liffs of the Zaër are one of the only tribes in Morocco to speak a close version of the bedouin Ḥassāniyya dialect of modern-day Arabic, a language originating from central Mauritania, where the Zaër historically migrated from. Despite the Zaër language sharing a common Arabic lineage with the rest of Morocco, their dialect was distinct enough from the rest of Morocco's Arabic- and Amazigh-origin languages that there remained a distinct language barrier preserving the Zaër identity from the rest of Morocco's tribal groups.

Geography

Despite outside threats by neighborhing tribes who desperately sought out the Zaër's rich grazing lands, the Zaër were the main occupants of their historical ranging lands in the east and west for centuries. As a result, the Zaër had a mutual understanding and relationship with the government of Morocco due to their proximity to Rabat, only 20 kilometers west of the westernmost group of Kefiane Zaër. In exchange for cooperation and general oversight from the Rabat government, the Zaër were relatively free to practice their customs in their traditional rangeland as they saw fit.

==== The Tata ====
While the two liffs typically did not mingle between each other and often remained in their own territories, they did still cooperate frequently in the face of great dangers to the Zaër. This alliance was known as the Tata, in which the two liffswould join forces to fight back against outside threats to the group. The Tata was typically invoked to combat threats from neighboring tribes or confederacies, but was also utilized to combat the colonizing forces of the French in the later nineteenth and twentieth centuries.

== Colonial Impact ==
Before the French destruction of the Zaër community, the Zaër had a very loose relationship with their French occupiers. In February and March 1910, the French and Mulai Abd al-Hafid, Sultan of Morocco, engaged in comprehensive negotiations, in which the Sultan ceded control of the state to a French protectorate status which took complete effect in 1912.

During the initial years of the French occupation, the Zaër were administered by French-controlled qaids, qadis, stenographers, clerks, and mukhaznis, all of which comprised the main administration link between the Zaër and the government in Rabat. However, even despite the various administrative bodies attempting to oversee the Zaër, they were still mostly left to their own devices, despite a few clashes between French forces and the tribesmen. A particularly nasty clash occurred after the murder of a French lieutenant by a band of Zaër tribesmen; as retaliation, the French sent back multiple troops to completely decimate the Zaër. These violent clashes were reminiscent of both the feelings of the Zaër towards their French occupiers, as well as the attitude of the French towards the local tribes in their acquired territory.

=== The French Administration Over the Zaër ===
In the early 1910s, as the French secured military control over the vast majority of the country, the new administration began to take on a more active role in enforcing their rule and, more importantly, their way of life onto the various tribes of Morocco, including the Zaër. The French implemented a system of local administration known as contrôles civils to work alongside tribal administrative organs. While they originally exerted very little influence over the tribal administration, they rapidly began to overtake tribal autonomy by imposing judicial authority over legal matters in the Zaër territory, imposing tax collections, spreading improved seed collection and agricultural innovations on traditional Zaër lands, and prompting greater French involvement in the Zaër lands by funneling state funds into investment in irrigation, agricultural development, and road infrastructure.

==== Decline of Zaër Culture ====
As the historical Zaër lands began to become fractured both physically and politically, the influence of local tribal authorities came under increasing strain. The tribal authoritative branch known as the jma'a (English: Jama'ah), which was made up of tribes' elders and who traditionally oversee the economic, social, and political affairs of the Zaër, rapidly began to lose authority as legal issues began to fall under the jurisdiction of the contrôles civils. With the tribe's authoritative influence on the decline, the Zaër experienced an internal shift as many young Zaër traveled to cities, received a rudimentary education under a newly colonized administration, and returned as critiques of the rigid ways of life of the Zaër, further fragmenting the culture.

The roads were also equally devastating to the physical isolation that aided with the preservation of the Zaër culture. Massive highways were developed to connect cities such as Casablanca, Rabat, and Meknes, which cut through massive sections of the Zaër rangeland and turned the once-remote region into a network of communication, road, and housing infrastructure for Europeans crossing the Moroccan countryside. This massive development effectively sliced up the traditional Zaër nomadism, and forced many Zaër to turn to different methods of economic self-sufficiency, including day labor to answer the demand for development.

==== Fragmentation of Zaër Rangeland ====
However, the most devastating element of the French's occupation occurred in the 1920s, when the French administration began to lease the lands occupied by the Zaër to outsider bidders, which were almost always French agriculturalists, known as kolons, who were eager to purchase the valuable, fertile land. Land could only be claimed on an individual family basis, which meant that even individual tribes within the liffs were forced to abandon their collective ownership traditions in order to be eligible to legally purchase the land they had historically occupied for centuries. By the mid 1950s, the region had over 1,500 French and European agriculturalists who had introduced modern farming techniques and brought intensive farming practices, including the use of tractors and combines, to the area. As a result, the local economy shifted farther and farther from the demand of meat, fur, and animal byproducts provided by the Zaër and other endemic tribes and closer to a cash crop economy centered around wheat and grain production.

The Zaër lost thousands of acres to agriculture, and became increasingly unable to provide basic necessities for their families using their traditional economic practices. Many Zaër ended up seeking employment at the massive European farms, becoming agriculturalists, peasants, and sharecroppers, and were forced to abandon their pastoral traditions and community structure in a near-complete, bloodless destruction of Zaër culture.

=== The Zaër Today ===
Not much of traditional Zaër society remains today. Much of the social unity which kept the Zaër united today was physically destroyed by infrastructure development, and socially decimated by inheritance laws and land rights designations. The Zaër are not recognized as an ethnic group by the Moroccan government, although there are likely thousands of descendants of the Zaër today.

== See also ==
- Beni Ahsen
- Doukkala
