= Rahamna =

Arab tribe

- Maqil tribe
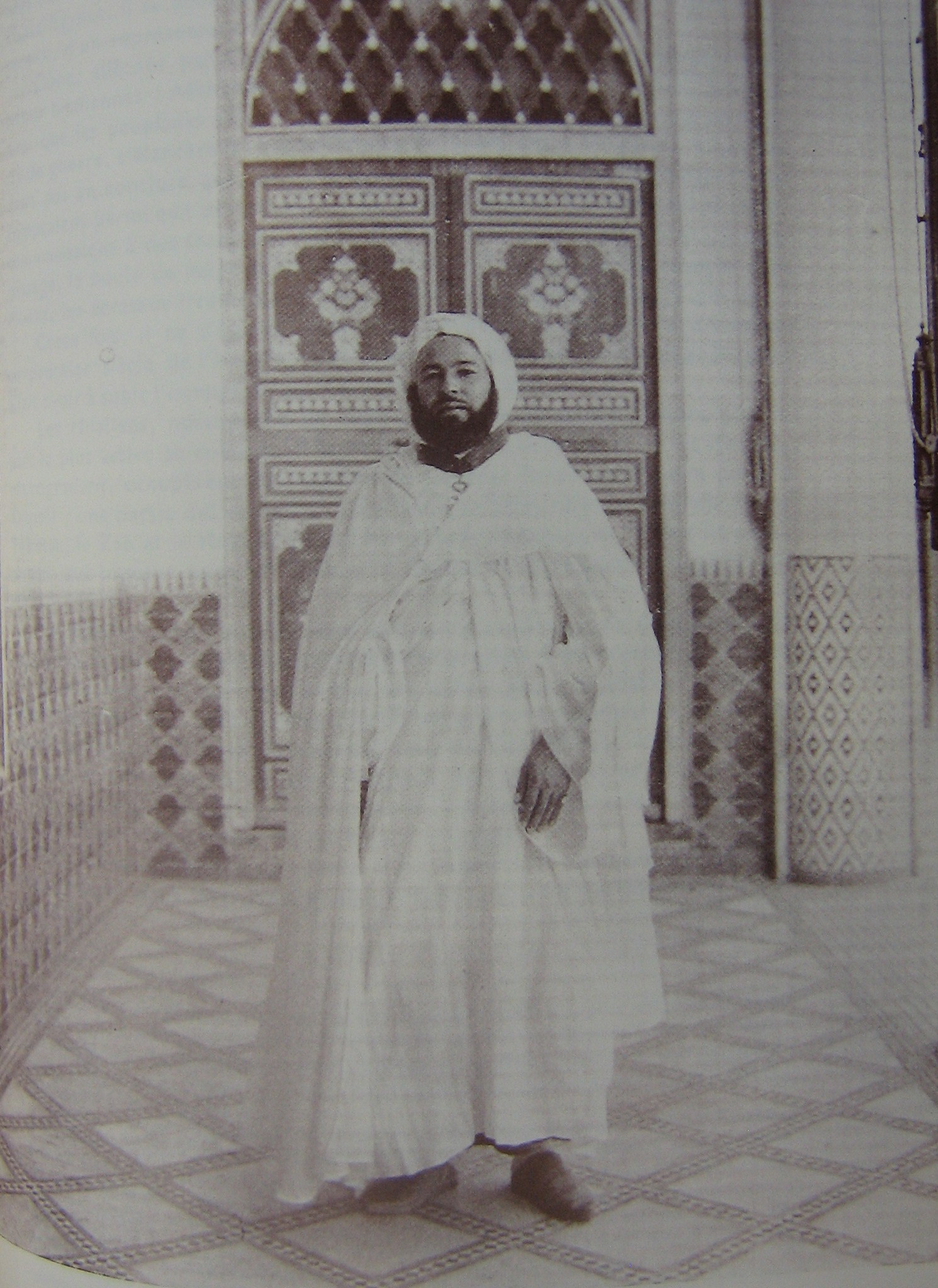
- Miloud bin al-Hashimi al-Ayyadi, who was appointed qaid of the Rahamna by Abd al-Hafid of Morocco
- Ethnicity: Arab
- Nisba: ar-Rehamni or ar-Rahmuni
- Location: Morocco
- Parent tribe: Banu Hassan
- Language: Arabic
- Religion: Sunni Islam

Rahamna (Arabic: الرحامنة, romanized: Raḥāmna), also spelled Rehamna or Rhamna, is an Arab tribe that descends from the Banu Ma'qil tribe. They today are situated in the region north of Marrakesh but first settled north of the Sahara between the 13th and 15th centuries. Their people descend from one famous common ancestor, namely Rahmoun bin Rizq bin Oudi bin Hassan (Arabic: رحمون بن رزق بن أودي بن حسان). The Rahamna, according to Professor Abdul Rahim al-Otri, is one of the Arab tribes that came to Morocco from the Arabian Peninsula through Egypt and Libya, then to Mauritania and Morocco, before settling in what is now Rehamna Province. This cross-country migration gave the tribe a mixture of tribal origins and affiliations and created several clans composed of Arab, Berber and African components. They are related to the Yagout tribe (part of the Tekna tribal confederation), who live in the Western Sahara.

== History ==
=== Rahamna in the Sahara ===
The Rahamna first settled the Sahara like other Maqil tribes. Historical authors like Valentim Fernandes and Luis del Mármol Carvajal described the Rahamna as one of the most powerful and numerous of the Sahara. They practiced extensive animal husbandry associated with limited cereal cultivation, so they had wheat, meat and honey compared to the Oudaya and the Berabish who lived only on camel milk. The Rahamna were also traders and played an important role in the trade between the Niger Basin and the south west of Morocco.

=== Rahamna under the Saadians ===
In the early 16th century, the Portuguese diverted the traditional routes of gold and slave trade to the Atlantic coast which negatively impacted the Moroccan economy leading to an alliance between the Rahamna and the Saadians. In 1525, they mobilized with Mohammed al-Shaykh to fight the Portuguese in Agadir (Santa Cruz), Mogador, Safi and Mazagan. In the second half of the 16th century, they inhabited a vast plain north of Marrakesh previously inhabited by the Berber Haskoura tribal confederation.

Some sources like Marmol attest that Mohammed al-Shaykh rewarded the Rahamna for their acts of jihad by granting them the region of Tamasna. Despite the close relationship of the Rahamna with the Saadians, the Rahamna were not affiliated with the Saadian or Alaouite guich but were part of the naiba tribes that pay tax and placed a contingent of horsemen and infantrymen under the orders of the central Makhzen. The Saadians were accustomed to taking wives from the Rahamna with the most famous example being Sahaba al-Rehmania who gave birth to 4 sons. One of these sons was Abd al-Malik Saadi who died at the Battle of Alcácer Quibir and accompanied by his mother, went to Constantinople and sought the support of the Ottoman Empire for his claim on the Moroccan throne.

=== Rahamna under the Alaouites ===
From the 18th century onwards, the Rahamna were a powerful group dominating the Haouz. The Alaouite sultans relied on them to maintain order among the other tribes in the region, and consulted their governors and some of their faqihs to appoint the chiefs of the Haouz. A dahir described the Rahamna as being "distinguished by their discipline, their devotion, their services and their good sense". A letter from the Makhzen mentioned them the sultan Mohammed ben Abdallah "relied on them, distinguished them and used them more than all the troops in his army, because they could replace them all". This perception meant that under Mohammed ben Abdallah the Rahamna enjoyed a certain privilege since the sultan saw them as a force he could count on. He chose Mohamed ben Oumrane Rehmâni as vizier and designated him as caliph of Marrakech and its surroundings. He also married El Bathul, the daughter of the qaid Abdallah Rehmâni and sent her brother Mohamed Ezouine on an embassy to the Ottoman sultan Abdul Hamid I.

They had a similar privileged status under Moulay Slimane who wrote in a letter addressed to them "Since my accession, you have always benefited from my praise; I have placed you at the head of Souss and Draa; I have entrusted you with the administration of Marrakech; I have favored you over all the other tribes; I have appointed Ezzouine at the head of Haouz and as vizier and advisor... you are the dome of Haouz and its heart... I have nothing dearer than you".

The Rahamna were problematic for the Makhzen during the late 19th and early 20th century because they had not abandoned their nomadic lifestyle and sedentarized. The Jews of Marrakesh were frequently targeted by the Rahamna who attacked the mellah in 1907 demanding the enforcement of the dhimmi sumptuary regulations as a condition to prevent another siege. Many poor Rahamna migrated to the city of Marrakesh with more wealthy members owning houses there. At the time, they were the largest tribe in Marrakesh making up a third of the population; they were largely concentrated in the north eastern edge of the city near the Zawiya of Sidi Bel Abbes. In 1906, the population of Marrakesh was around 50,000 to 60,000. The Rahamna opposed the succession of Abdelaziz of Morocco in 1894 and because of this opposition were suppressed by his grand vizier and regent Ba Ahmed. When Abd al-Hafid, the brother of Abd al-Aziz, couped Abd al-Aziz, they gave support to Abd al-Hafid partly due to the memories of the past suppression under Abd al-Aziz and his relationship with Europeans.

During the rise of Ahmed al-Hiba, the Rahamna were split into two fractions: pro-Glawa and pro-Mtougga (the Glawa and Mtougga were both part of the "Lords of the Atlas"). While the pro-Glawa fraction came to side with the French, the pro-Mtougga fraction supported the jihad of Ahmed al-Hiba. The pro-Glawa fraction was led by al-Ayyadi bin al-Hashimi while the pro-Mtougga fraction was led by Abd al-Salam al-Barbushi. In 1912, the Rahamna region was the scene of the Battle of Sidi Bou Othman, a battle during the French conquest of Morocco. The defeat of Ahmed al-Hiba in this battle led to the capture of Marrakesh the next day.

== Culture ==
Like Bedouins, the Rahamna perform Tbourida, an equestrian performance which simulates a succession of military parades. They believe that horses represent nobility and chivalry and are a blessing to the household even when drought and high prices halt the celebrations for several years. Both men and women partake in the performance. The Rahamna tribe is famous for their Bedouin musical style called "Aita", which both men and women perform. Women in villages in the region of Rahamna gather together on Fridays at someone's house to work together to make couscous with some preparing the couscous grains and others preparing the vegetables. This is often used as time to catch up and gossip. Beekeeping and the production of honey is also common in the province of Rahamna.

=== Textiles ===
One of the identifying marks of the tribe is the carpets weaved by their women. There are two types of rugs made by the Rahamna and the tribes in the Rahamna region. The first one is plain red without patterns or motifs with the other borrowing its ideas and basic design from the flatweaves. The differences between the two is slight.

== See also ==
- Beni Khirane
- Ahl Rachida
- Azwafit
- Marrakesh-Safi
- History of the Jews in Morocco
