= Gharb (Morocco) =

Plain in Morocco

Gharb غرب (Arabic)
- Traditional Region
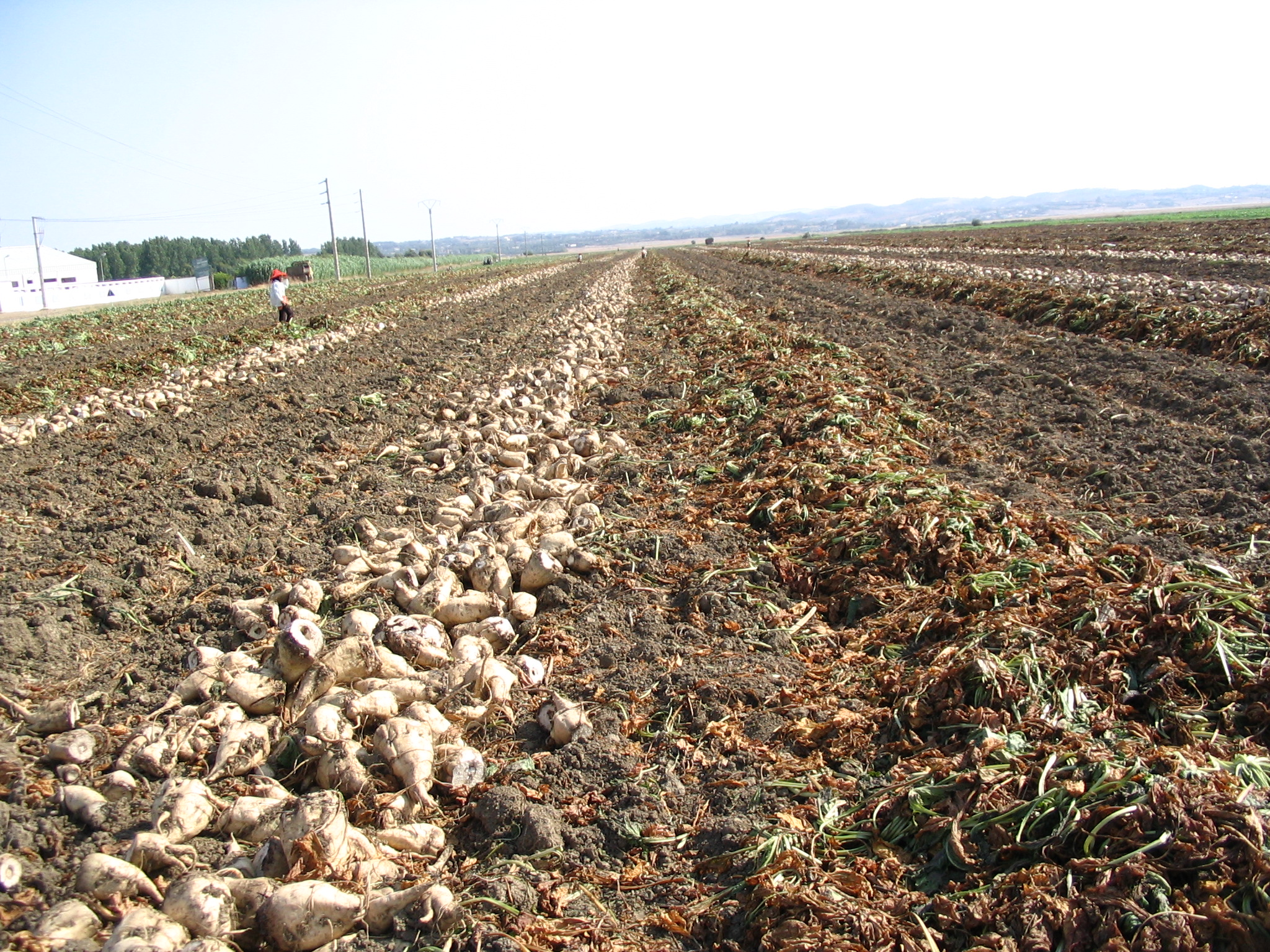
- Cultivation of sugar beets on large flat fields of the plain.

- the former Gharb-Chrarda-Béni Hssen region
- Country: Morocco
- Region: Rabat-Salé-Kénitra

The Gharb (sometimes Rharb, in Arabic: غرب "west") is a historical and geographical region in northern Morocco. It is a great flat plain crossed by the Sebou River, an area of about six thousand square kilometers in western Morocco, northeast of Rabat and northwest of Meknes, bordered by the Atlantic Ocean and the hills of pre-Rif.

== History ==
The Gharb was first inhabited by Berber tribes and potentially was part of the Barghawata Confederacy. However, with the rise of the Almoravid and Almohad dynasties they were exterminated making the area uninhabited. The Almohad ruler Yaqub al-Mansur settled Arab tribes of the Riyah belonging to the Banu Hilal in the Gharb and it has largely been inhabited by Arab tribes since. These tribes served the Makhzen until the end of the 19th century as military tribes and were nomadic and pastoral up until the French protectorate where the Gharb transformed into a prosperous agricultural district.

Historically, the region was also known as Azghar or Azaghar. Historical author and diplomat Leo Africanus places Azghar under the Kingdom of Fez and writing about Azghar said:

Azgar is a province bounded by the ocean to the north by the river Bou Regreg to the west, by the Ghomara, Zerhoun and Zalagh mountains to the east and by the river Bou Nasr to south. It consists entirely of plains full of excellent fields, and once teemed with people throughout its many cities and ksars; however, an ancient war ruined all the towns, and there remains no trace or sign today but a few little towns which are still inhabited. The province extends eighty miles in length and sixty miles in width and the Sebou River flows through the middle. The inhabitants are all Arabs called al-Khlot by the ruler of the al-Muntafiq; they are subjects of the king of Fez when he wages important wars, and their province supplies food, livestock and horses to all the Ghomara mountains, as well as the city of Fez. The kings stays here all winter and spring, for the land is healthy and abounds with deer and hares to hunt, although there are few woods.

== Tribal composition ==
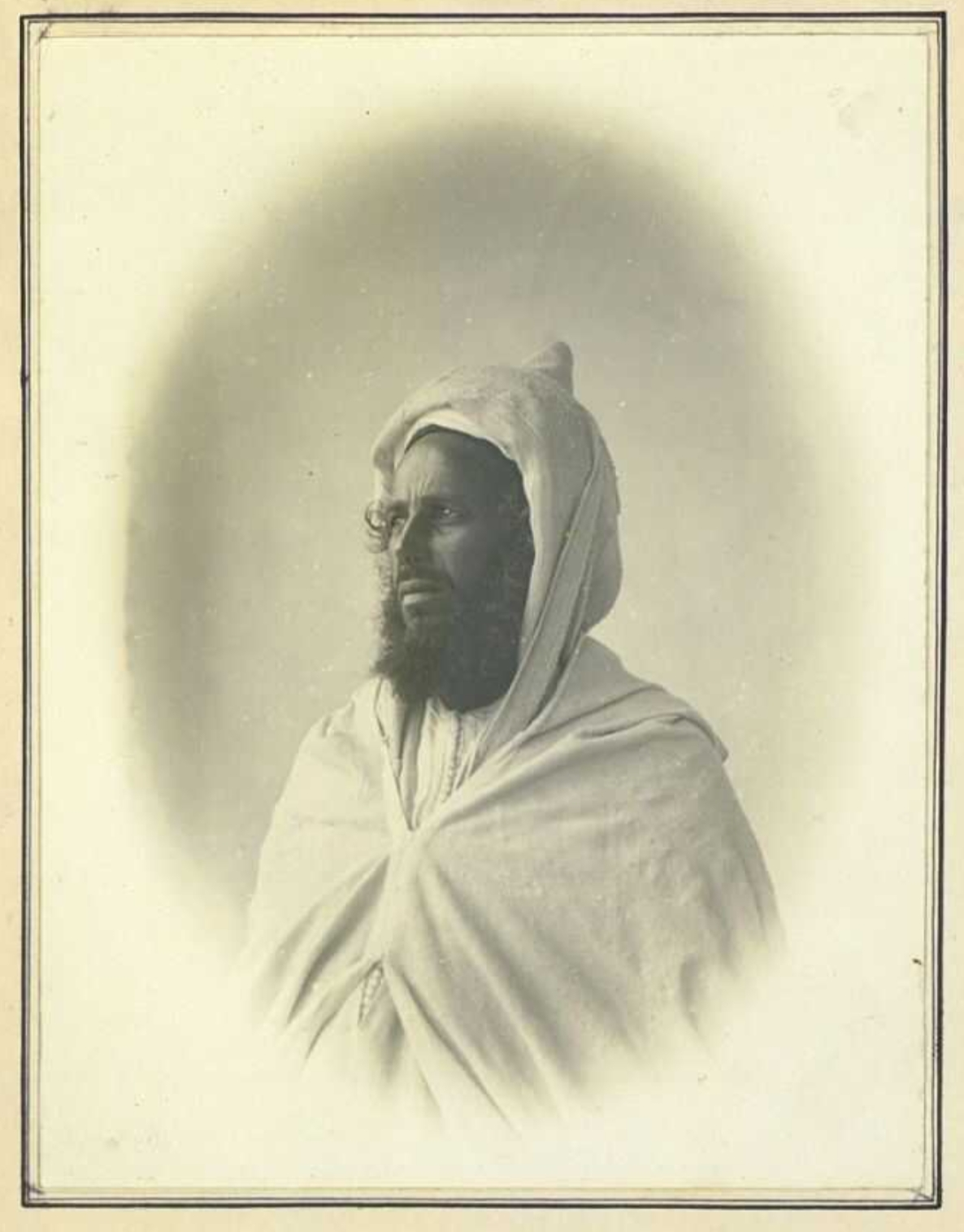
Driss Ben Kaddour el Oudii, caid of the Hadjaoua

The Gharb is largely inhabited by tribes of Arab origin:

- Beni Malik - Banu Hilal
  - Oulad Aissa
  - Oulad Hammad
  - Beni Bekkar
  - Oulad 'Acem
  - Ez-Z'heïr
  - Oulad Zyan
  - 'Aroua
- Sufyan - Jusham
  - Raouga
  - Bhara/Bahan
  - Menacera
- Khlout - Jusham
- Tlig - Jusham
- Beni Ahsen - Maqil
  - Amamra
- Oulad Khalifa - Shurfa
- El-Hadjaoua - Arab originally from Hejaz or potentially Berber
- Bdaoua - Arab originally from Hejaz
- Chléat - Shilha from the Sous
- El-Ferakcha-El-Chkakfa - Arab
- El-Harakta-El Neghamcha - Arab
- Doukkala - A group of Arabs originally from Doukkala
- Oulad Sidi Omar el-Hadi
- Aouf - Arab

== See also ==
- Kenitra
- Souk El Arbaa
- Ksar el-Kebir
- Chaouia
- Doukkala
