= Habt =

The Habt (Arabic: بلاد الهبط, romanized: Bilād al-Habṭ) is a historical and geographical region located in northwest Morocco.

== Toponymy ==
The place name "Habt" means "descent" and probably dates back to Idrisids.

== Geography ==
The Habt is characterized by the presence of plains and mountains. It comprises the plains of Rharb and Khlot and part of the Rif, a mountainous region.

Leo Africanus, a diplomat and explorer of North Africa in 15th and 16th centuries, wrote:

The region is bounded by the river Ouergha to the south, the ocean to the north, the Azgar marshes to the west and the mountains facing the Pillars of Hercules to the east; it is eighty miles in width and a hundred in length. The region is marvellously fertile, consisting mostly of plains full of rivers.

== History ==
Because of its proximity to the territory of al-Andalus, the Habt was one of the first Arabized areas in Morocco.

According to Leo Africanus, the province of Habt (‘amalat al-Habt) was founded during the Wattassid dynasty. Two centuries later, under the Alaouites, the region of the Jebala and Faḥṣ (nāḥiyat Jbāla wa al-Faḥṣ) has supplanted administratively.

After the Battle of Sétif in 1153, the victorious Almohads forced some of the defeated Banu Hilal tribes to move to Morocco. During the 17th century, the sultan Ismail Ibn Sharif created a guich army made up of warriors from the Banu Hilal.

Ibn Khaldun, an historian of North Africa, wrote:

Les tribus de Djochem et de Rîah s'étant alors empressées de faire leur soumission, il les déporta dans le Maghreb-el-Acsa où il établit la première dans la province de Temsna, et la seconde dans le canton d'El-Hebet et dans les régions maritimes d'Azghar, province située entre Tanger et Salé.

== See also ==
- Plains of Rharb, one of the plains of Habt
- Spanish protectorate in Morocco, Habt part of the protectorate from 1912 to 1956
- Jebala (region), another region in Morocco

== Sources ==
- Michaux-Bellaire, Édouard (1911). Leroux, Ernest (ed.). "Quelques tribus de montagnes de la région du Habt". Archives Marocaines. Publications de la Mission scientifique du Maroc. XVII. Paris: 1–11.
