= Beni Guil =

Arab tribe in Morocco

Beni Guil بني ݣيل
- Bedouin Arab tribe
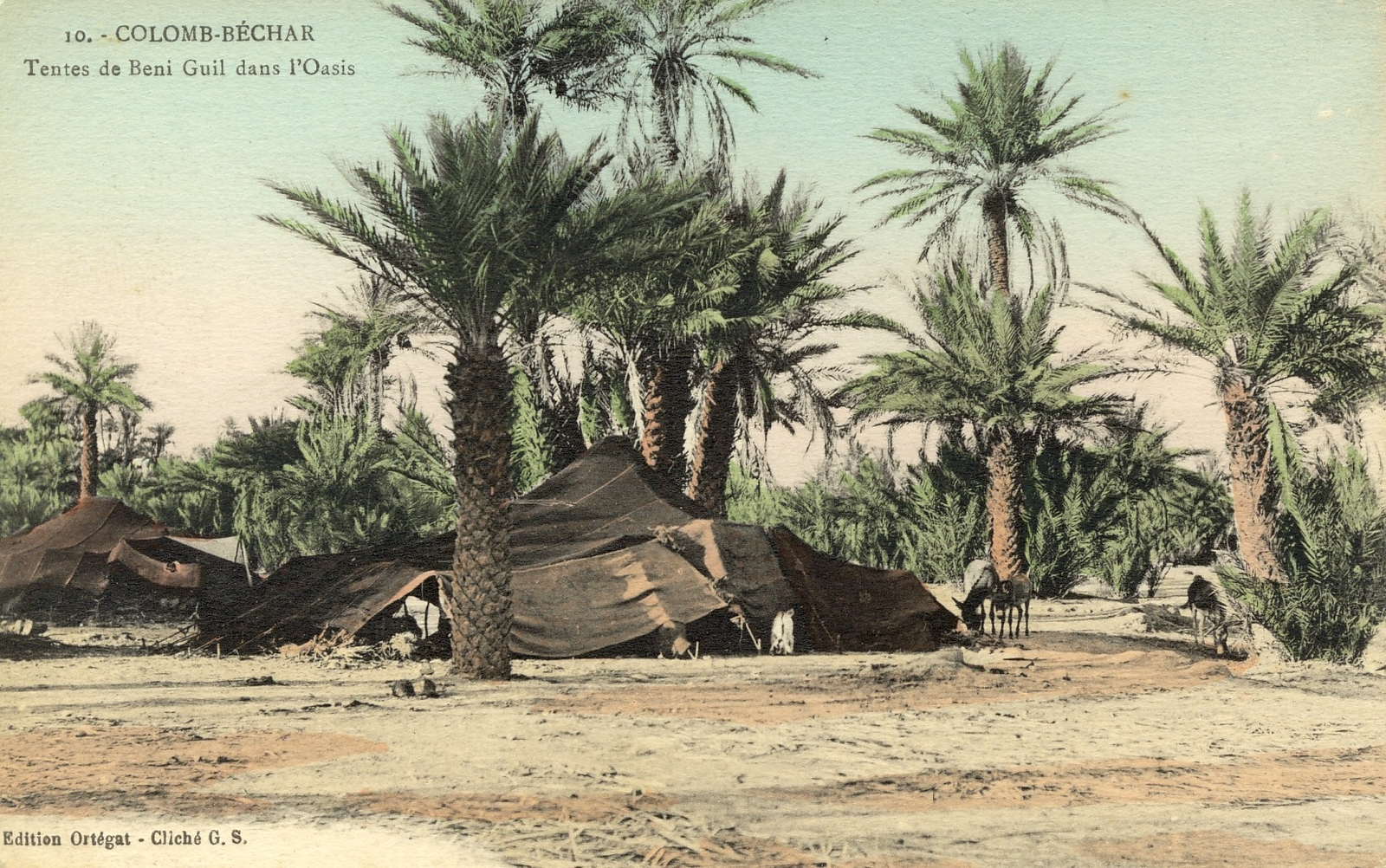
- Beni Guil tent, 1914
- Ethnicity: Arab
- Location: Eastern Morocco
- Population: 54,000 (1994)
- Language: Arabic
- Religion: Sunni Islam

Beni Guil (Arabic: بني ݣيل, romanized: Banī Gīl) is an Arab tribe in Morocco, and are mostly nomadic Bedouins. In the 10th century, after migrating from the Arabian Peninsula, the tribe was given the right of grazing on the land of east Morocco and west Algeria by Al-Mu'izz li-Din Allah, the Arab Fatimid caliph of North Africa.

The tribe had a population of 54,000 people in 1994, and they inhabit a vast desert territory in eastern Morocco of 25,000 square kilometres. They remain as Morocco's largest livestock farmers and they raise as many as 600,000 sheep, 200,000 goats, and 11,000 cattle in an average yield-year.

Tribe flag of the Bani Guil tribe, mainly used during the anti-colonial resistance

== Beni Guil sheep ==
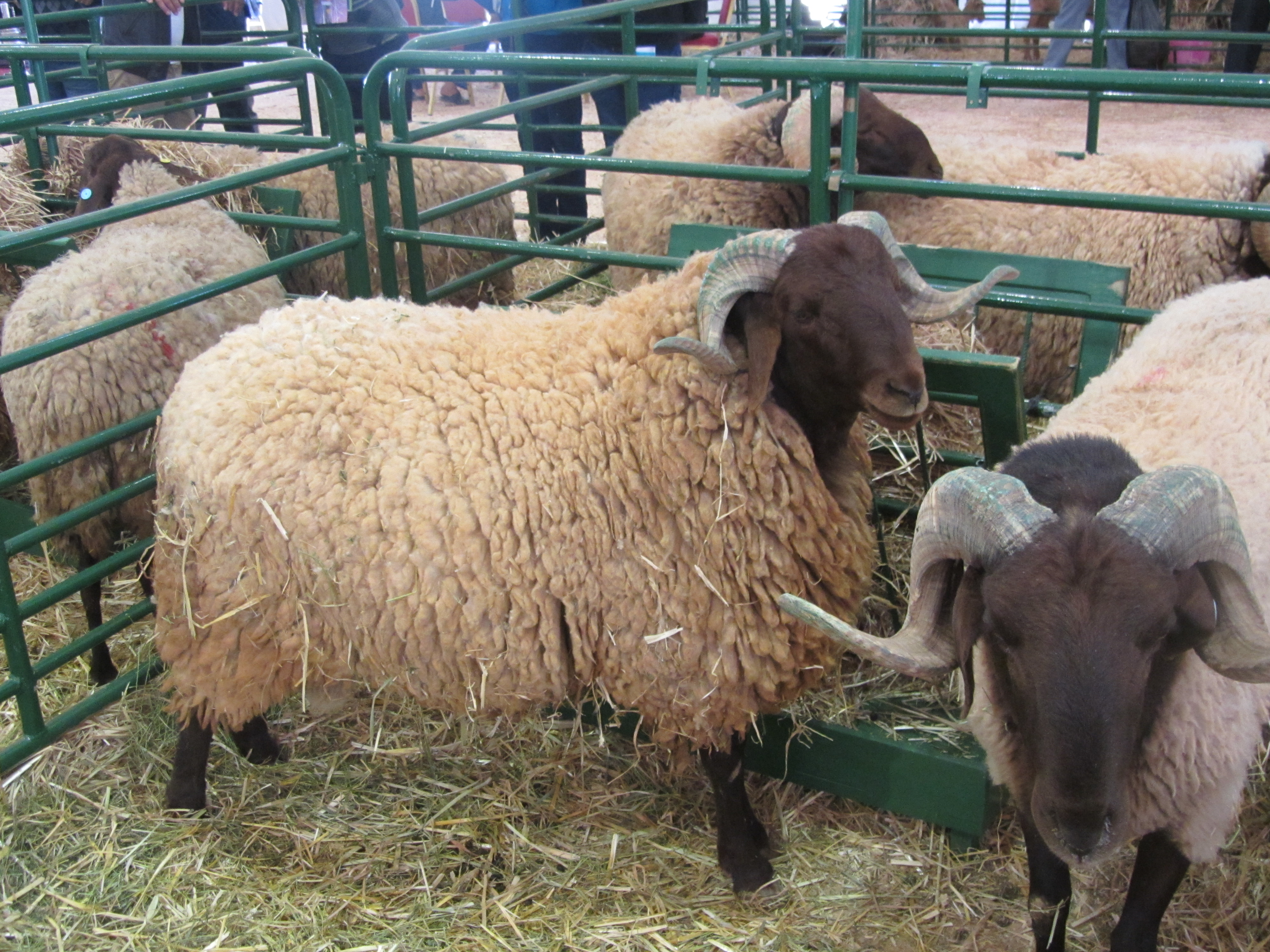
Beni Guil sheep

The tribe Beni Guil has given its name to a famous breed of sheep in Morocco. The Beni Guil race, called locally as "Daghma" or "Hamra" in reference to its brown color. The flocks are considered a prized possession amongst the tribe.

The Arabian tribes which settled for over 1000 years in North-Africa, have brought with them their flocks, which explains the origin of this breed.

The Beni Guil male sheep breed has a dark brown head, but the head is slightly clear in the female sheep. This coloration extends to the rear of the horns and the lower jaw. It has a white fleece and brown legs. The legs and head are free of wool. The tail is short and fine; it does not exceed the point of hock. The Beni Guil breed of sheep have such a good conformation that makes them one of the best mutton breeds in Morocco.

== See also ==
- Arab Maghreb
- Fatimid dynasty
- Idrisid dynasty
- Morocco

=== Other tribes ===
- Banu Hilal
- Banu Malik
- Ahl Rachida
- Beni Hassan
