= Khlout =

Arab tribe in Morocco

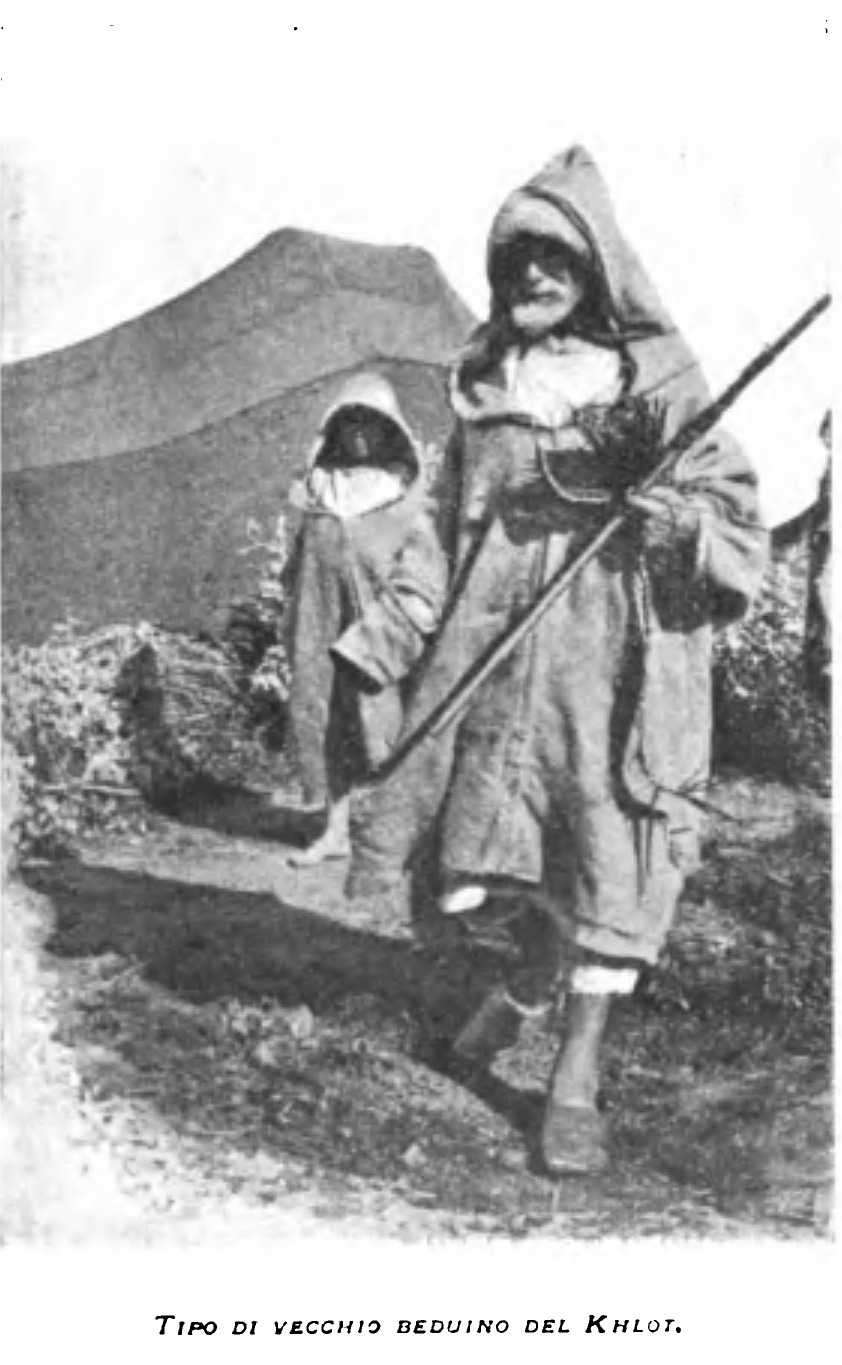
Old Bedouin of Khlout c. 1907

The Khlout (Arabic: خلوط, romanized: Khlūṭ) also written as Khlut, Khlot and historically known as Khult (Arabic: خلط, romanized: Khulṭ) is an Arab tribe belonging to the Jusham of the Banu Hilal confederacy in Morocco. They today inhabit the Gharb region along with other Arab tribes.

== History ==
Originally from Bahrain, the tribe first settled in Egypt then Tunisia. In the twelfth century, Almohad ruler Yaqub al-Mansur brought them to Morocco and installed them in Tamesna (current day Chaouia) along with the other Jusham tribes. According to Ibn Khaldun, the Khlout belonged to the Banu al-Muntafiq.

In 1221, the Khlout supported the rival caliph Idris al-Ma'mun against the caliph Abdallah al-Adil who had the support of another tribe belonging to the Jusham, the Sufyan. Idris al-Ma'mun was proclaimed caliph and was then succeeded by his son Abd al-Wahid II (or al-Rashid). Despite this, because of the misdeeds and violence of the Khlout, Abd al-Wahid II took strong measures against the Khlout chiefs who then rebelled and took the side of the pretender Yahya al-Mu'tasim. The Sufyan, now reconciled with Abd al-Wahid II, attacked the Khlout on the banks of the Oum Er-Rbia. The Khlut proclaimed the Andalusian Ibn Hud as caliph but Abd al-Wahid II pursued them, drove them back and captured their chiefs. Now defeated, they would take part in the expeditions of the caliphs but their rivalry with the Sufyan continued. This rivalry would later prove fatal to the Almohads when at the siege of Tamzesdekt against the Zayyanid ruler Yaghmurasen, it brought about the death of the Almohad caliph Abu al-Hasan as-Said al-Mutadid and the defeat of the Almohads.

The Marinid sultan Abu Thabit treated the Khlout harshly for their violence, but he used them to destroy the power of the Riyah and he then settled them in their land: the Azghar and Habt. They also formed part of the Makhzen where they marriage alliances with the rulers and provided them provincial governors, ambassadors and advisers. They passed into the service of the Wattasids and did not support the Saadi dynasty.

Around 1540, they entered the service of Mohammed al-Shaykh and then they rebelled against him to join the Turkish army of Wattasid ruler Abu Hassun. After Mohammed al-Shaykh became the ruler of Morocco, he removed the military controls of the Khlout, introduced the payment of taxes and deported their leader to Marrakesh. With the advent of Ahmad al-Mansur, and due to their heroic conduct at the Battle of Wadi al-Makhazin in 1578, Ahmad al-Mansur reintegrated half of the tribe to the army and the makhzen. When the rebel, al-Ayyashi compelled them to march against the Christians of Larache, he was unable to get their support and was assassinated by them.

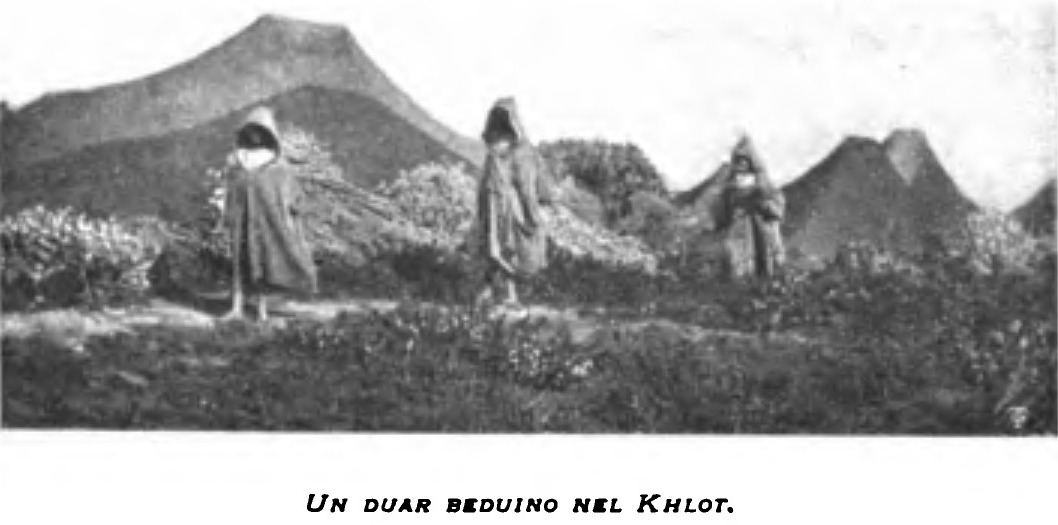
Bedouin douar belonging to Khlout

Under the Alaouites, the Khlout took the side of the petty princelings of Northern Morocco who had made themselves independent under the cover of waging holy war. Moulay Ismail after first reducing them into submission, deprived them of their makhzen tribe status and favoured the establishment of the Tlig and Badawa groups in the region who inevitably reduced the power of the Khlout in the land.

According to Leo Africanus, the Khlout were able to put 12,000 cavalry and 50,000 infantry into the field. Writing about the Khlout, he said:

The Muntafiq live in the plains of Azgar and are now called al-Khlot; they pay tributes to the King of Fez, and number 8000 well-equipped cavalry.

== Religion ==
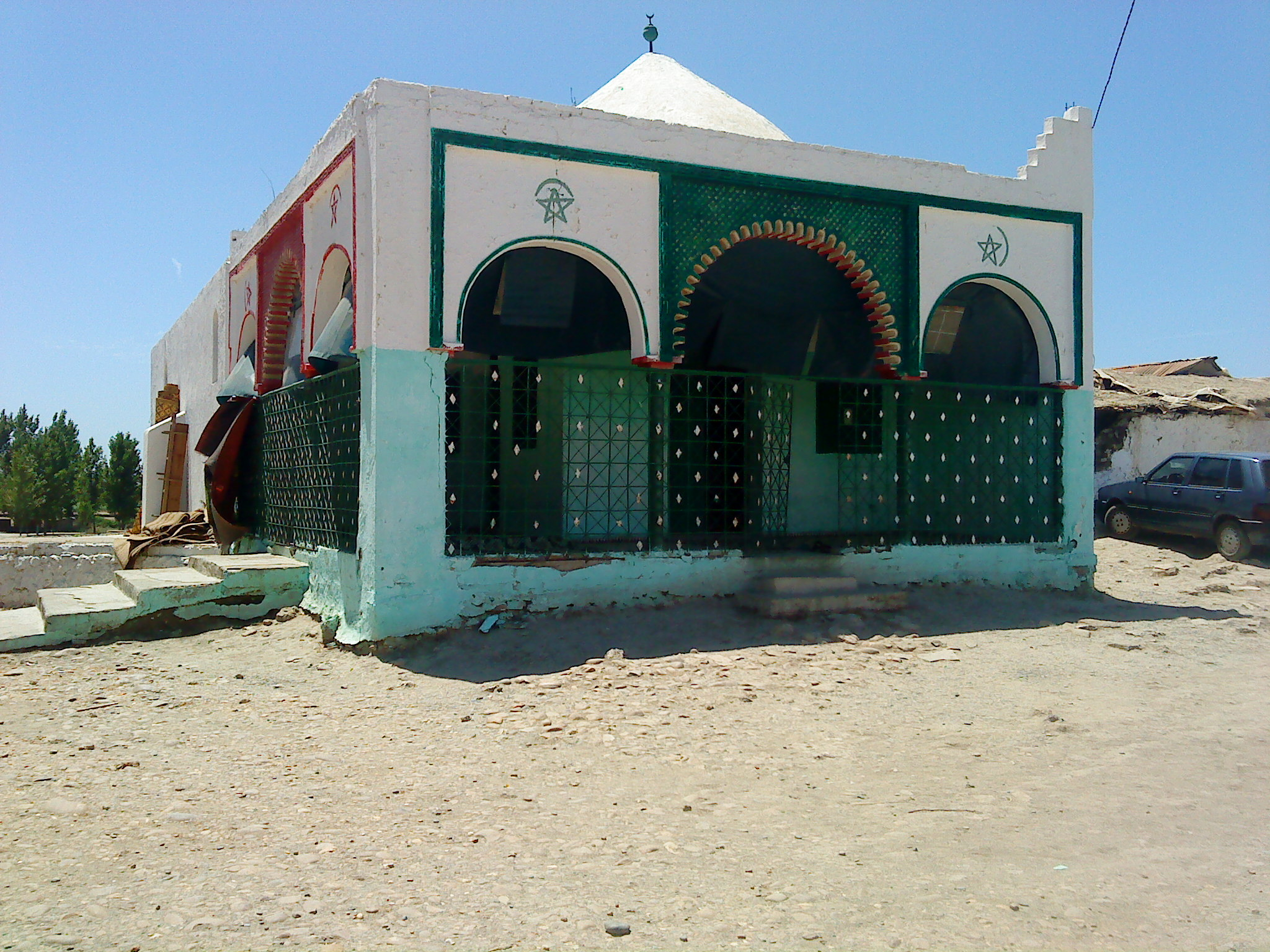
Shrine of Sidi Ali Bu Junun

Historically the most influential Sufi brotherhoods among the Khlout were the Qadiriyya (known as the Jilaniya in the Maghreb), Aissawa and the Hamadsha.

Some of the scholars and saints of the tribe include ‘Antar al-Khultī, ʿĪsā ibn al-Ḥasan al-Miṣbāḥī al-Khultī, Abū Yaḥyā al-Khultī and al-Maydhūb or Yaḥyā ibn ʿAllāl al-ʿUmarī al-Khultī.

A famous saint of the Khlout is Sidi Ali Bu Junun who according to local legend had the ability to control disbelieving jinn, hence the name Bu Junun (lit. 'Possessor/Controller of Jinn-induced Insanity'). He settled in the ruins of Banasa where his zawiya remains today which still attracks visitors from the Gharb mostly due to mental health related issues.

== Subdivisions ==
According to Edouard Michaux-Bellaire and Georges Salmon, the Khlout are divided into seven fractions:

- Soualah (Arabic: الصوالح)
- Oulad Amran (Arabic: أولاد عمران)
- Douʿissa (Arabic: الدوعيسة)
- Oulad Jelloul (Arabic: أولاد جلّول)
- Oulad Zeitoun (Arabic: أولاد زيتون)
- Bjeir (Arabic: بجير)
- Oulad Yagoub (Arabic: أولاد يعڨوب)

According to Alfred Le Chatelier, the Khlout are divided into two main fractions: Oulad Hamed and Oulad Zahra. These are further subdivided into El-Bdour, Oulad Zeitoun, Soualah, Ougdjem, Oulad Amran, Dreissa and Outleg.

== See also ==
- Beni Ahsen
- Banu Hilal
- Beni Hassan
- Maqil
- Larache
