= Abda (Morocco) =

Abda عبدة
- Ma'qili Arab tribe
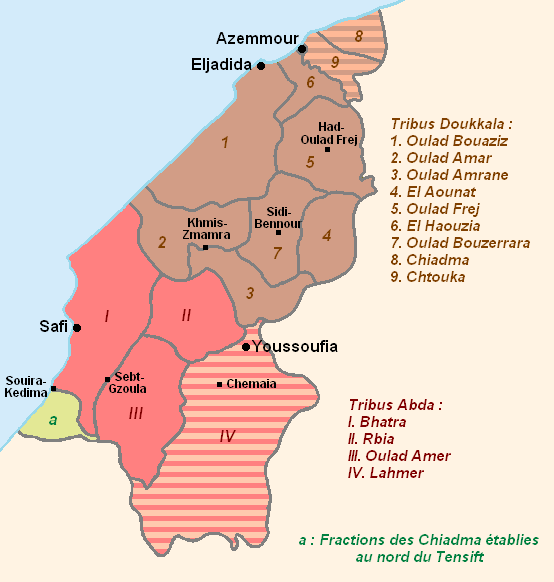
- Abda tribes in red
- Ethnicity: Arab
- Location: Western Morocco
- Parent tribe: Banu Ma'qil
- Branches: Bhatra; Rabi'a; 'Amer
- Language: Arabic
- Religion: Sunni Islam

Abda (Arabic: عبدة, romanized: ʿAbda) is an Arab tribal confederation in Morocco, descended from Banu Ma'qil. They settled in the coastal plains of western Morocco in the 12th century during the rule of the Almohad Caliphate, where they have been established since the end of the Marinid era. The Abda tribal confederation is made up of 3 tribes: Bhatra, Rabi'a, and 'Amer.

19th-century French diplomat Eugène Aubin noted that "the Abda are a powerful tribe, thirty-five-thousand fires strong, of pure Arab race, they occupy a fertile territory, rich in horses and cattle. It is one of five quasi-Makhzen tribes of Morocco."

== See also ==
- Beni Hassan
- Banu Hud
- Jebala people
- North African Arabs
