= Algerian Arab sheep =

Breed of sheep from algeria

Algerian native sheep
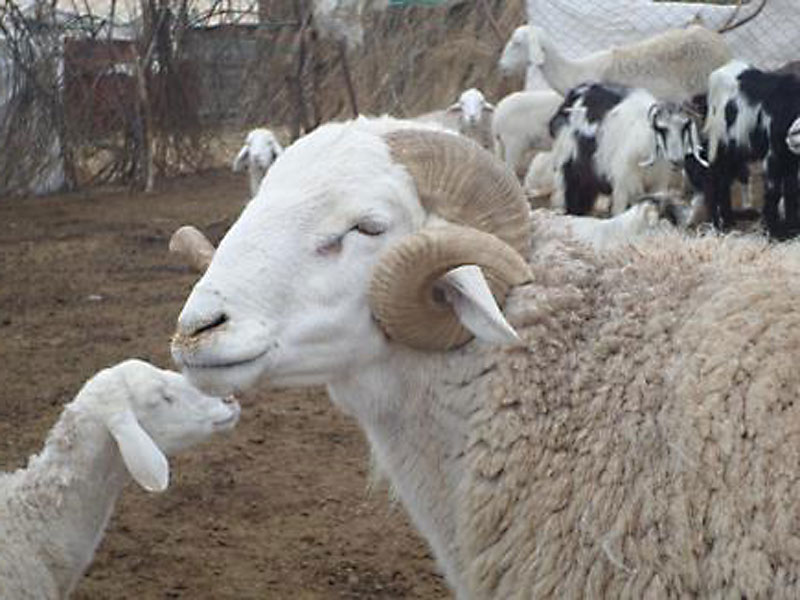
- Ouled Djellal
- Other names: Ouled Jellal; Western Thin-tailed
- Country of origin: Algeria
- Use: Meat

Traits
- Weight: Male: 81 kg (180 lb); Female: 49 kg (110 lb)
- Height: Male: 84 cm (33 in); Female: 74 cm (29 in)
- Horn status: Rams are horned and the ewes are polled (hornless)

Notes
- Adapted to live in arid climates

Algerian Arab sheep (also called Ouled Jellal and Western Thin-tailed) is a breed of domesticated sheep found throughout Algeria. This breed does grow a carpet-grade wool, and is raised primarily for meat.

== Characteristics ==
The rams are horned and the ewes are polled (hornless). Both sexes display white and are unicolored. At maturity on average, rams weigh 81 kg (180 lb) and have a height of 84 cm (33 in) at the withers. Ewes, on average, weigh 49 kg (110 lb), grow to 74 cm (29 in) at the withers and average 1.5 lambs per litter. Ewes lactate for approximately 180 days and provide 75 kg (170 lb) of milk to their offspring during that period.

The Algerian Arab have long legs that are well suited for walking for extended periods of time. This breed is well adapted to live in arid climates. From 1989 to 2003, the population increased from approximately 10 million to 11 million.

This breed is believed to have evolved from the Tadmit sheep in Algeria.
