= Beni Khirane =

Arab Hilal tribe living in Morocco

Beni Khirane (Arabic: بني خيران, romanized: Banī Khīrān) is an Arab tribe of Hilalian descent, who settled in Morocco in the 11th century. The tribe is part of the Tadla Confederacy.

== About ==
The Beni Khirane tribe live in the Tadla region of Morocco. They form part of the greater Beni Hilal (Arabic: بني هلال, romanized: Banī Hilāl) tribe who crossed to the Maghreb in the 10th century. They were introduced in Morocco during the eleventh century under the reign of the Almohad. They are mainly farmers who have largely preserved a Bedouin spirit.

== See also ==
- Arab tribes
- Maghreb
- Maghrebis
- North African Arabs
