= Beni Ahsen =

Arabian Moroccan tribe

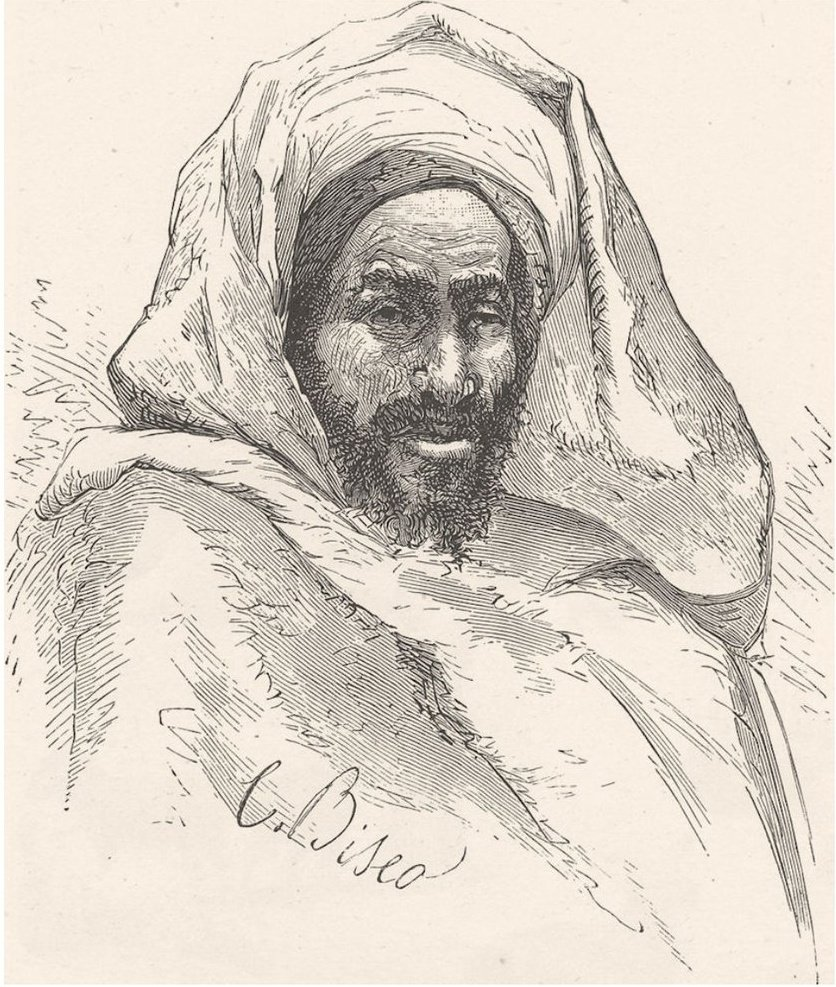
A drawing of a man from the Beni Ahsen tribe

The Beni Ahsen (Arabic: بني احسن, romanized: Banī Aḥsan) sometimes referred to as the Beni Hassan (Arabic: بني حسن, romanized: Banī Ḥasan) is a Moroccan Arab tribe belonging to the bigger Maqil tribe located in the region north of Rabat.

== History ==
Areas inhabited by the Beni Ahsen in blue

The tribe settled in Morocco in the 12th century. Around the 16th century, they moved to the Missour and Almis area between Tafilalt and Fez. In the 17th century, they advanced northwest to the Sefrou region, in order to reach the Mamoura Forest and the plain of Gharb. In the 18th century they were pushed more westwards by the Aït Zemmour tribe, which moved up from the south. Today they are located in the region stretching from Salé to Sidi Slimane.

== Beni Ahsen sheep ==
The tribe gives its name to the Beni Ahsen sheep breed, an ancestor of the Merino sheep breed.

== See also ==
- Khlout
- Rahamna
- Oudaya
- Beni Hassan
