= Arab tribes of Algeria =

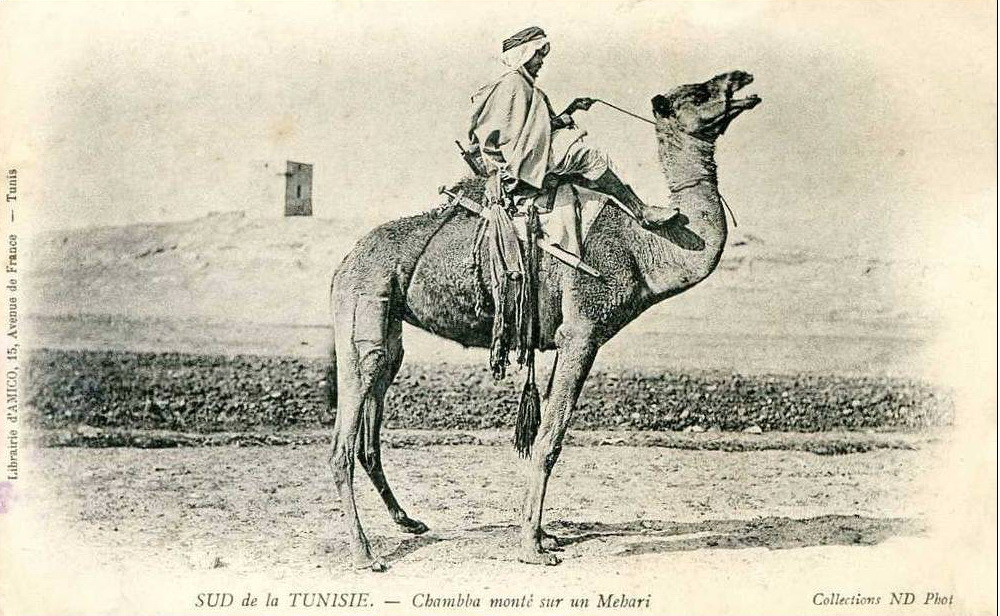
Chaamba tribesman riding a camel in southern Tunisia, c. 1934.

Following the spread of Islam, Algeria experienced three major waves of Arab migration that significantly altered its demographics and culture. The first wave occurred in the 7th century, with Arab political and trading elites settling mainly in large cities following the Muslim conquest of the Maghreb. This was followed by the large-scale migration of Bedouin tribes, including Banu Hilal, Banu Sulaym, and Banu Ma'qil in the 11th century, who settled in rural areas, especially the plains. Around the same time, Arabs from al-Andalus (Moors) also migrated, further contributing to the Arabization of the country. Gabriel Martinez described these Andalusian Arabs as the "watchdogs" of the Arabic language.

The first wave of migration led to the Arabization of tribal society from the top down, while the later Bedouin migration brought about Arabization from the grassroots level.

== Background ==
In medieval Algeria, tribal power relied on the internal cohesion of social relations and a horizontal hierarchy, emphasizing resource sharing and direct democracy, under the leadership of a charismatic figure who acted as both decision-maker and arbiter. This tribal formation valued its autonomy.

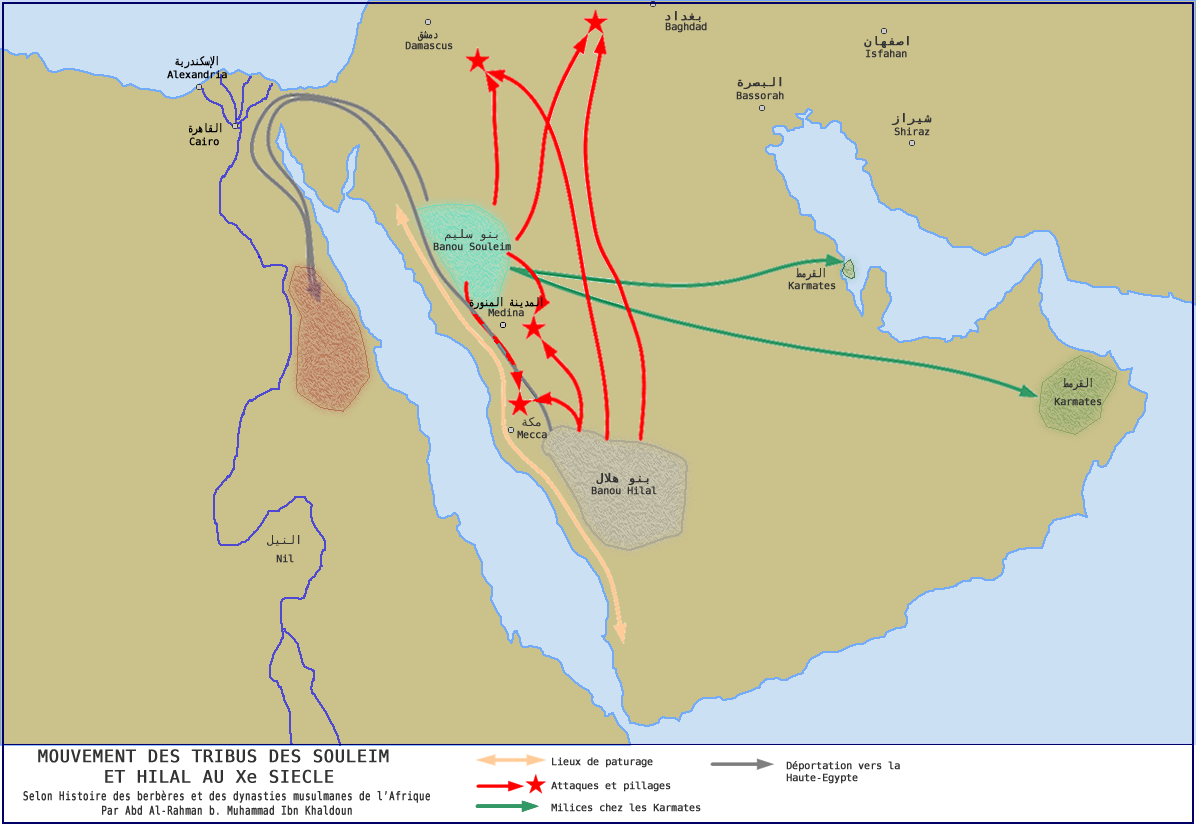
Migration routes of Banu Hilal and Banu Sulaym from the Arabian Peninsula to Egypt

French generals noted in their memoirs that Algeria had around 1,200 tribes, indicating a complex and functional tribal order during Ottoman rule. However, this system was disrupted by the colonial regime from the beginning of the French conquest of Algeria in 1830 and the First World War. Disruption took place through physical destruction, land dispossession, and destruction of traditional authority structures, as well as the imposition of new cultural norms on indigenous populations. The French colonial empire sought to dismantle the tribal system, replacing it with douar-communes that served the colonial state. Despite these efforts, the tribal system endured but gradually lost its coercive power over individuals.

The surveys conducted during the senatus consultum of 1863 revealed significant confusion in the oral traditions of Algeria, making it challenging to distinguish between Arab and Berber groups. This difficulty stemmed from the Islamization and Arabization processes that led to numerous mythical genealogical reconstructions. Over time, the tribal system contributed to a fusion of Arab and Berber identities, with oral traditions retaining little beyond the names of prominent founding ancestors. Several reorganized themselves around influential figures, including religious leaders such as Marabouts and military leaders such as Djouad.

== Notable Algerian Arab tribes and clans ==
=== Urban Arabs (first settlements) ===
The urban Arabs constitute the first settlement of Arab tribes in the Maghreb, starting in the 7th century:

- The Banu al-Aghlab (Aghlabids) of the Banu Tamim were an Arab tribe originating from northern Arabia who came to Algeria before the Hilalian invasions.
- The Banu Ukhaidhir of the Quraysh were an Arab tribe originating from the Hejaz region that were present in Algeria since the 9th century.
- The Fihrids were aristocratic Arab family from the Quraysh clan. They settled in the Maghreb (in Cyrenaica, Ifriqiya, Biskra and al-Andalus) from the 7th century, following the conquests of Uqba ibn Nafi. The members of this family have particularly marked the history of the Maghreb and al-Andalus, notably Yusuf al-Fihri, Habib al-Fihri, and Abd al-Rahman al-Fihri I.
- Sharifian tribes such as the Sulaymanids and Idrisids that are descended from Banu Hashim, between the 8th and 10th centuries.

=== Bedouin Arabs (second settlements) ===
Although the first Arab migration to the Maghreb in the 7th century during the first conquests was essentially composed of settled Arab noble clans in smaller numbers, the second wave was much more substantial in that it was mainly composed of nomadic tribes.

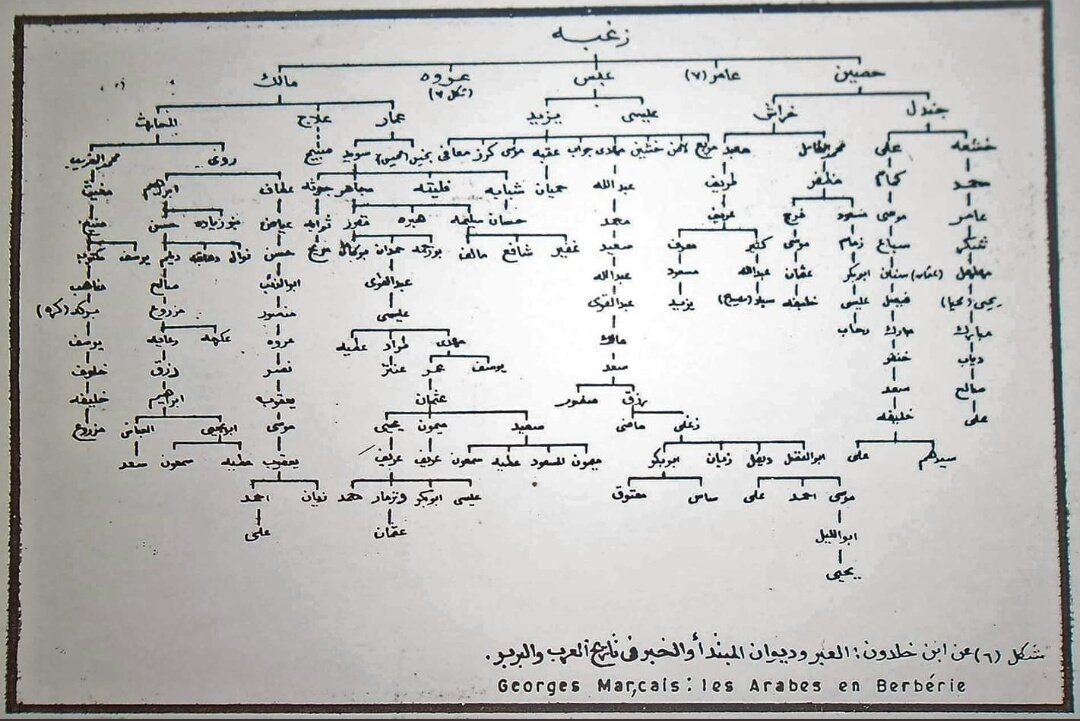
Genealogy of the Zughba branch of the Banu Hilal listed by Georges Marçais, 1913.

The objective of the Fatimid Caliphate was to regain suzerainty over the Zirids, to repopulate the Maghreb, which had been insufficiently exploited until then, and to reverse the demographic trend so that the Berbers were no longer the majority. The original tribe of the Banu Hilal was then composed of three fractions, themselves constituted into sub-factions:

- Athbaj: Durayd, Taouba, Bokhtor, Kherfa, Dahhak, Iyad, and Latif
- Riyah : Mohammed, Mirdass, Sinber, and Dhouaouda
- Zoghba : Malik, Yazid Amer, and Suwayd

During their migration to the Maghreb, the Banu Hilal were joined by three other Arab tribal groups:

- Jusham : Qorra, al-Assem, Moqaddem, Khlout, Sofiane, and Djaber;
- Maqil : Hedadj, Kharadj, Shabanaat, Ghosl, Metarfa, Thaleba, Ahlaf;
- Sulaym : Zoghb, Heib, Aouf, Kaoub, Hakim, Debbab, Ouchah, Djouari.

The influx of Hilalians was a major factor in the linguistic, cultural, and ethnic Arabization of the Maghreb and in the spread of nomadism in areas where agriculture had previously dominated. Estimates of the displacement of Arab populations from the 11th century onward vary among historians from 200,000 to 1,000,000. According to Luis del Mármol Carvajal, the Hilalians numbered over a million, and he estimated the Hilalian population at his time at 1,000,000 in 1573.

In the 16th century, the total population of Arab tribesmen in the Maghreb states was approximately 4,650,000, distributed as follows: 3,000,000 in Morocco, 900,000 in Algeria, and 750,000 in Tunisia and Tripoli.

Arab tribes of Algeria
Tribe	Clan	Factions	Subtribes	Locations
Banu Hilal	Athbaj	Durayd Toba Bokhtor; al-Jazia; 'Amour; Dahhak and Iyad; Mechref (Mekhadma); Latif; Gerfa	Durayd(Ouled Attia), Ouled Serour, Djar-Allah, Touba); Gerfa (Beni Mohammed, Beni Marwan, Hadjelate (Kleib, Chebib, Sabah, Serhane, Nabet); 'Amour(Ouled Zekrir, Ouled Faris, Ouled Aziz, Ouled Mad'i); Dahhak and Iyad (Mehaïa, Oulad Difel, Ouled Derradj, Beni Zobeïr, Mortafa (Ouled Tebban, Hanancha, Ouled Abd as-Salam, Kharadj, Oulad Sakher, Rahma; Latif(Yetama (Dawi Motref, Dawi Bou Khalil, Dawi Djelal), Lokman (Oulad Djerrir, Braz)	Aures; Setif; M'Sila; Biskra; Laghouat; Algiers; Constantine
Banu Hilal	Jusham	El-Assem; Mokkadem; Jusham	Jusham (Khult, Beni Jaber, Seffiane (Hareth (Oulad Mota), Klabia)	Biskra
Banu Hilal	Riyah	Ali; Mirdass; Amr; Saïd; Dhouaouda	Mirdass (Sinber, Douaouida, Amr, Meslem, Djaber, Moussa, Mohamed, Messaoud); Ali (Fader, Dahmane); Amr (al-Akhdar: Oulad Sidi Yahia ben Zakra, al-Briket, al-Khamès (origine berbère) Oulad Youcef, Oulad Fedhala); Saïd (Oulad Youssouf (Mekhadma, Roïwat, Bohour), Atba, Ouled Amer); Dhouaouda(Ziban/Larbâa; Ouled Ben Gana, Ouled Ben Saïd, Debbaâh; Ferdjiwa: Ouled Ben Achour; Médjiana: Ouled Ben Gherman, Ouled Ben Guendouz, Ouled Mokran; Zouagha : Oulad Ben Azzedine, Ouled ben Cheikh. Oulad Sakhr, Oulad Messaoud, Oulad Ali)	Setif; M'Sila; Biskra; Laghouat; Constantine
Banu Hilal	Zughba	Amer; Malek; Hossaïn; Aroua; Yezid; Hamyan	Beni Amer (Yakoub, Hamid, Chafaï: Oulad Sidi Ghalem, Ouled Ali, Ouled Sidi Bouzid, Ouled Laghouati, Ouled Brahim el-Amarna(Amarna (Beni Amran) are descended from Banu Maaqil) Hassassna, Ouled Mimoun, Ouled Sleimane, Oulad Sidi Abdelli, Ouled Daho, Ouled Zeir, Hazej, Ouled Sidi Messaoud, Chefaa, Ouled Sidi Khaled, Ouled Bouammar, Ouled Ali Benyoub, Ouled Djebara, Djaïza, Ouled Sidi Ahmed Ben Youcef, Oulad Sidi Maâchou, Djaïza, al-Mehadja); Malek (Banu Suwayd (Medjaher, Mehal, Flitah divided into: Oulad al-Aïd, Chelogh Kebbar, Chelogh Seghar, Oulad Roumia, Beni Louni, divisées elles-mêmes en sous-faction: Oulad Ahmed ben Soltan, El-Mahal, Oulad ben Chaa, Oulad sidi Harrat, Oulad Souid, Oulad Rziq, Oulad ben Ali, Hassassna, Habra, Zaouïa Sidi Mohammed ben Aouda, Chorfa Menasfa, Hannetra, Oulad ben Jahia, Oulad Sidi Mohamed ben Aïssa, Oulad Amer, Oulad Rached, Oulad Barket, Beni Issed, Oulad Raqfa, Beni Lawma, Beni Dargoun. Oulad Qoçaïr), Ghrib and Attaf of Beni Harith (Beni Yakoub), Dialem (Beni Bou Ziad, Dehakna, Noual, Akkerma), Sebih (Awlad Ammour, Zmala Kherba, Awlad Zouheïr, Bir Djaneb; Awlad Ali, Awlad Ziyad, Sbaa, Awlad Aawn, Awlad Sabbah, Haranfa); Hussein (Djendel (Oulad Messaoud, Oulad Feredj, Oulad Taref), Kharrach); Aroua (En-Nadr: Oulad Khelifa, Hamakna, Cherifa, Sahari, Dawi Ziane, Oulad Slimane; Homeïs: Obeidallah, Fedar', Yakdan (Oulad Naïl) Jebel Amour: Zenakhra (Sanajra)); Yezid (Ouled Lahek, Saad (Beni Madi, Beni Mansour, Zoghli), Ouled Madhi, Khachna, Beni Moussa, Mouafaa, Djouab, Herz, Marbâa, Hamiyan); Hamyan (Gharaba: al-Makhaoula, Rezaïna, Oulad Serour, Oulad Djerir, Oulad Fares; Cheraga: Chefaa, Lanbah, Oulad Mebarek, Denaqa, Awlad Sidi Shaykh, Cheraga)	Sidi Bel Abbas; Témouchent; Djelfa; Miliana; Chlef; Relizane; Aurès; Biskra; Béchar; Tiaret; Oran; Tlemcen; M'sila
Banu Maqil	Sakil (Dawi ‘Ubayd Allah; Thaaliba); Mohammed (Beni Mokhtar; Dawi Mansour)	Beni Mokhtar: Dawi Hassan, Roqaïtat, Shibanat; Dawi Mansour: Oulad Bou al-Hossain, Hossein, Amran (Amarna alliés aux Ouled Brahim des Beni Amer), Mounabate; Dawi' Ubayd Allah: (Dj'aouna, Ghocel, Metarfa, Oulad Othmane ou Othmana)	Ababsa (Ouled Rahou, Ikhaf, Ouled Hamed, Ouled Mahdi); Shibanat (Beni Thabit, Beni Ali); Dawi 'Ubayd Allah (Ahl Angad Cheraga: Oulad Sidi Khalifah, Beni Matar, Oulad Bel-Horr, Oulad el-Hamel, Kharidji, Ouled Belagh, Achacha); Ghocel(Beni Ouazan, Oulad Ala, Karazba, Awamer, Oulad el-Khouan, factions Zenata, Oulad Rchal, Mgannia, Mediouna Gharaba, el-Faoul, Mediouna Cheraga); Ghenamna (Debabha: Ataouna, Oulad Hamou, Oulad Saad. Chemamcha: Oulad Rezoug, Oulad Hussain, Maadid)	Beni Abbes; Béchar; Adrar; Tindouf; Algiers; Sétif; Sidi Bel Abbas; Saoura
Banu Sulaym	Debbab; Heïb; Zirb; Aouf	Debbah (Ouled Ahmed, Beni Yezid, Sobh'a, H'amarna, Khardja, Oulad Ouchah' (Mehamid, Djouari, Hariz), Oulad Sinane, Slimane); Heïb (Chemmakh, Beni Lebid, Salem (Ahmed, Amaïm, Aalaouana, Ouled Merzoug); Aouf (Mirdass, Allak (Beni Ali: Ouled Mrai, Ouled Soura, Ouled Nemi, Bedrana · , Hadra, Hedjelane, Djomeïate, Homr, Messania, Ahl Hossein, Medji; Beni Hakim: Ouled Djaber, Chr'aba, Naïr, Djouïne, Ziyad, Makâd, Molâab, Ahmed)	Aalaouna of Tiaret; Mhamid of Mascara and Constantine; Ouled Aouf of Saïda; Ouled Bellil of Aumale; Troud of the Sahara of Constantine	
Shurafa		Ouled Sidi Yahia ben Taleb (Idrisids); Ouled Sidi Abid	Ouled Sidi Yahia ben Taleb (Ouled Si Aïssa, Ghiana, Ouled Guedaïm, Sehairia, Srardia, Khemaissia, Ouled Alaï, Laâwassia, Laâwachria, Chraouia)	Tebessa; Aurès
Others			Mitidja	

== Map ==
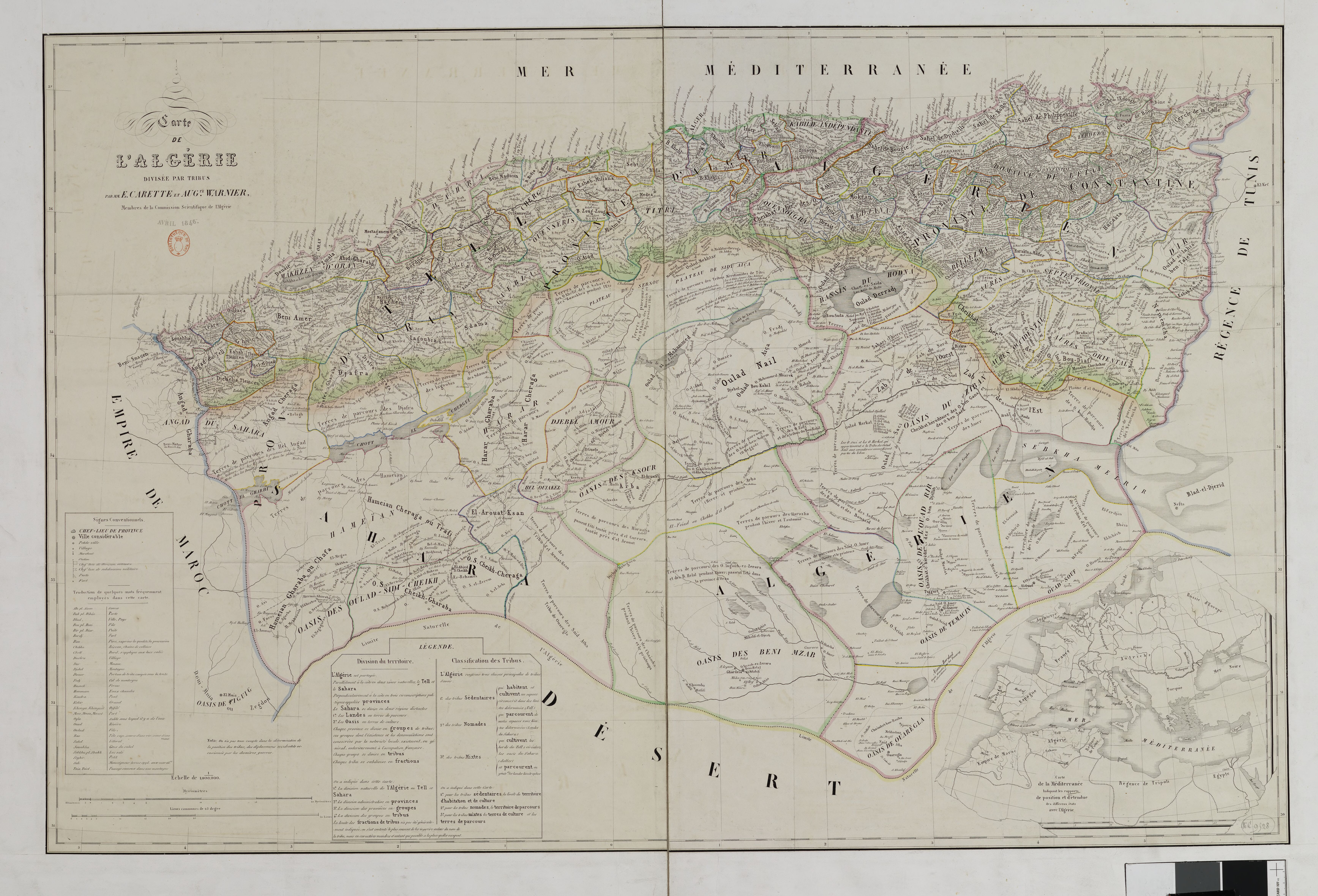
Tribal map of Algeria, 1846

== See also ==
- Arab tribes of Iraq
