= Arab migrations to the Maghreb =

Medieval migrations of Arabs to the Maghreb

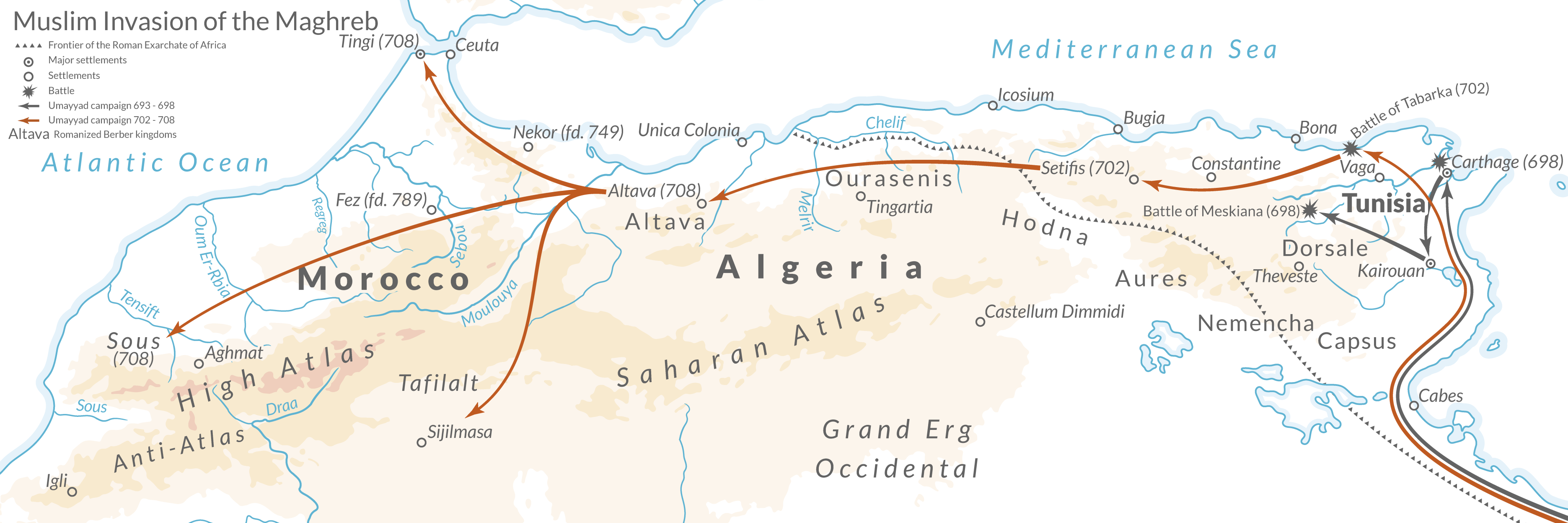
- Map depicting the routes Umayyad armies took during the Arab conquest of the Maghreb in the 7th century
- Date: c. 7th century — 17th century
- Location: Maghreb, North Africa
- Cause: See §Causes
- Participants: Total unknown: 150,000 (7th century); less than 100,000 to 250,000 (Note: broad estimates up to 1,000,000 by Idris El Hareir see the section Banu Hilal and Banu Sulaym (11th–12th century))(11th–14th century)
- Outcome: Indigenous populations increasingly identified as Arab rather than Berber in language and identity; Arabic becomes the lingua franca and dominant language; Arabization and displacement of large sections of the indigenous populations

The Arab migrations to the Maghreb (Note: also referred to as the Arab migrations to North Africa, Arab invasions of the Maghreb, Arab settlement of the Maghreb or the Arabization of the Maghreb.) involved successive waves of migration and settlement by Arab peoples in the Maghreb region of North Africa, encompassing modern-day Algeria, Libya, Morocco and Tunisia. The process took place over several centuries, from the early 7th century to the 17th century. The Arab migrants hailed from the Middle East, particularly the Arabian Peninsula, with later groups arriving from the Levant and Iraq.

The influx of Arabs to the Maghreb began in the 7th century with the Arab conquest of the Maghreb, when Arab armies conquered the region as part of the early Muslim conquests. This initial wave was followed by subsequent periods of migration and settlement, notably during the Umayyad and Abbasid caliphates and later Arab dynasties. However, the most significant wave occurred in the 11th century with the arrival of more Bedouin tribes from the Arabian Peninsula, such as Banu Hilal, Banu Sulaym, and Maqil. The last notable influx was from Al-Andalus in the 17th century as a result of the Reconquista. These migrants established numerous Arab empires and dynasties in the Maghreb, such as the Aghlabids, Idrisids, Sulaymanids, Salihids, Fatimids, Saadians and 'Alawites.

Arab migration had a profound impact on the culture and demographics of the Maghreb. Over centuries, the region underwent a process of Arabization, in which the indigenous Berber population adopted the Arabic language and culture. While genetic studies show high continuity with pre-Arab populations, several million Berbers underwent an ethno-socio-linguistic transformation following the migration of several tens thousands of Bedouins. Historians have characterized the Arab migrations, particularly those of the Hilalians, as the most significant event in the medieval history of the Maghreb.

== Causes ==
There were multiple factors that caused Arabs to migrate to the Maghreb. The first Arabs arrived in the 7th century with the goals of conquering Byzantine territories in the Maghreb and spreading Islam to the local populations, as well as protecting Egypt "from flank attack by Byzantine Cyrene" according to historian Will Durant. The Arabs who arrived in the 11th century were driven by factors such as instability and political unrest in the Mashriq. Arab immigration from the Mashriq to the Maghreb increased during periods of unrest and disorder. During a period of severe drought in Egypt due to a fall in the level of the Nile river, as well as plague and economic crisis, Bedouin tribes such as Banu Hilal and Banu Sulaym moved to the Maghreb, where the economic situation was better. The Fatimid caliph also persuaded them to march westwards by giving each tribesman a camel and money and helping them cross from the east to the west bank of the Nile.

Other Arab nomads were encouraged to settle in the Maghreb by local Arab dynasties, such as the Idrisids, Aghlabids, Salihids and Fatimids, to fulfil the Arabization of the non-Arab populations. Commercial activities such as the Trans-Saharan trade boosted the expansion of Islam and spread of Arabic, and trade with the Mashriq brought several Arab groups to the Maghreb. The Arab emigrants to the Maghreb from the 15th to the 17th century were largely refugees from Al-Andalus who left Christian Spanish persecution following the Fall of Granada in 1492.

== History and migrations ==
=== Rashidun and Umayyad era (7th–8th century) ===
Arab migration to the Maghreb first started in the 7th century with the Arab conquest of the Maghreb. This first started in 647 under the Rashidun Caliphate, when Abdallah ibn Sa'd led the invasion with 20,000 soldiers from Medina in the Arabian Peninsula, swiftly taking over Tripolitania and then defeating a much larger Byzantine army at the Battle of Sufetula in the same year, forcing the new Byzantine Exarch of Africa to pay tribute. By the late 7th century, the surge in Arab migration eventually succeeded in overcoming both Berber and Byzantine resistance. This gradual process led to the conversion of the Berbers to Islam and the full integration of the entire Maghreb into the Umayyad Caliphate. The Berbers embraced Islam en masse during the conquest, initially with limited commitment, although they continued to adhere to the religion due to its clear and simple doctrine, which strongly appealed to them. Throughout the period of conquest, Arab migrants settled in all parts of the Maghreb, arriving as peaceful newcomers who were welcomed everywhere. Large Arab settlements were established in several areas. A considerable portion of the Arab settlers belonged to the Najdi tribe of Banu Tamim. During the earliest Muslim conquests in the 7th to 8th centuries, about 150,000 Arabs settled in the Maghreb.

Arabs arrived in the Maghreb in large numbers after an expedition by the Banu Muzaina tribe to the Maghreb under the leadership of Zayd ibn Haritha al-Kalbi in the 7th or 8th century. The Arab Muslim conquerors left a significantly more lasting influence on the culture of the Maghreb compared to earlier and later conquerors, and by the 11th century, the Berbers had undergone significant Islamization and Arabization.

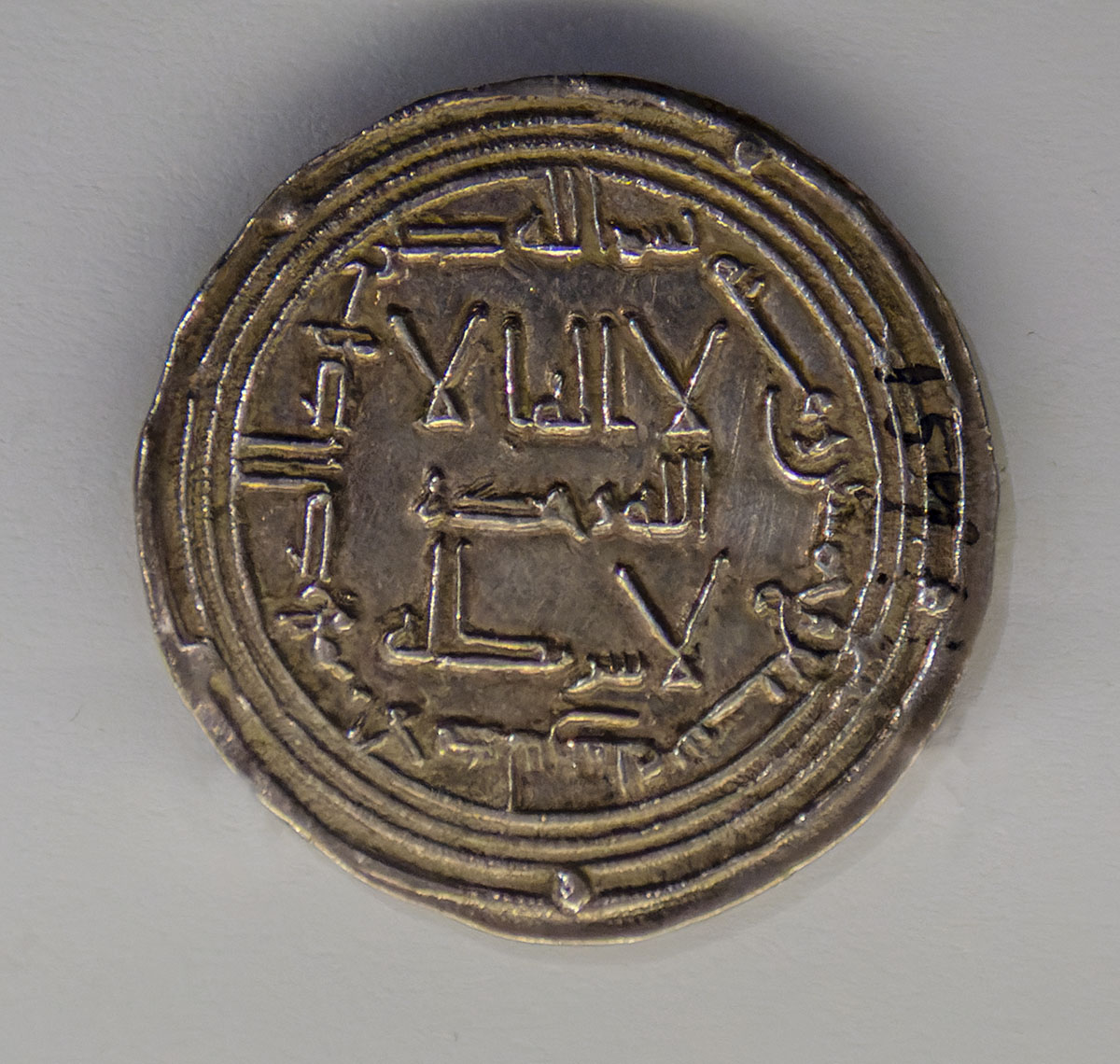
Dirham coin of Umayyad caliph Hisham ibn Abd al-Malik.

The Umayyad conquest introduced 50,000 Arab troops who had originally served in Egypt. These soldiers, along with their descendants, formed a hereditary ruling class, with very few elites being outsiders. These soldiers were rewarded with land grants, creating an Arab aristocracy that controlled substantial territories, which were primarily cultivated by slaves from sub-Saharan Africa. One notable example of this aristocracy were the Fihrids, descendants of Uqba ibn Nafi, who held a privileged status in both Ifriqiyan (modern-day Tunisia) and Andalusi society. Additionally, there were other influential Arab settlers, particularly those of Qurayshi ancestry. Arab settlers mostly settled in cities, such as Kairouan, until the migration of the nomadic Banu Hilal and Banu Sulaym in the 11th century. During this time, the majority of Maghrebi Arabs were Qahtanites from South Arabia.

The Umayyad Caliphate was aware of the importance of the spread and settlement of Arabs in the Maghreb to the Caliph. Umayyad Caliph Hisham ibn Abd al-Malik swore that he would send a large army and added "I will not leave a single Berber compound without pitching beside it a tent of a tribesman from Qays or Tamim".

=== Abbasid era (8th century) ===
The Abbasids reconquered Ifriqiya in 761 from the Kharijites that took over the region following the fall of the Muhallabids. During the rule of the Abbasid Caliphate, there was a great influx of Khurasani Arabs from Iraq to the Maghreb. These were mostly North Arabian tribes, among them was the Najdi tribe of Banu Tamim. This shifted the tribal balance of Ifriqiya in favor of the North Arabian Adnanite tribes who became the majority, to the detriment of the formerly more numerous South Arabian Qahtanite tribes.

=== Aghlabid, Idrisid, and Fatimid era (9th–10th century) ===
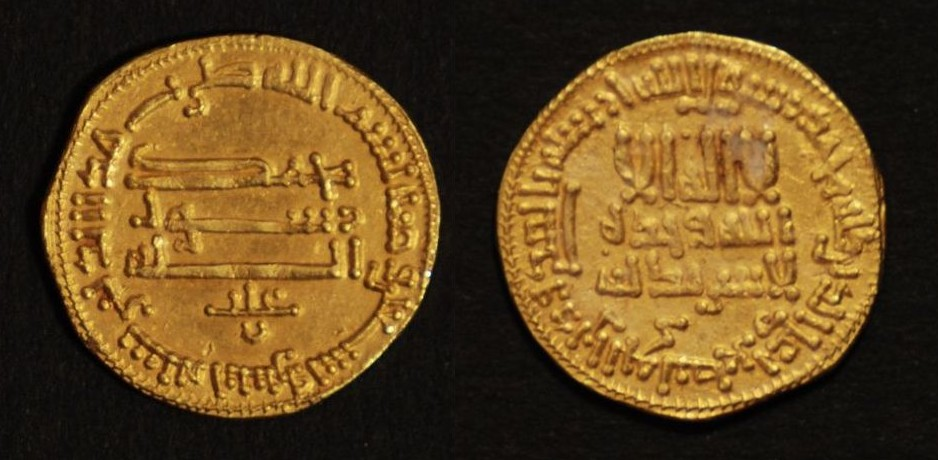
Aghlabid dinar issued during the reign of Emir Ibrahim I ibn al-Aghlab

In 800, Ibrahim ibn al-Aghlab was appointed as governor of Ifriqiya by the Abbasid caliph Harun al-Rashid. He founded the Aghlabid dynasty, a dynasty of emirs from the tribe of Banu Tamim. During this time, Arab migration increased in numbers due to the anti-Kharijite wars against the Rustamid dynasty. The structure of the Aghlabid army was largely derived from the Arab tribes that settled in Ifriqiya during the late 7th and 8th centuries. The soldiers were likely paid at specific intervals, with cavalry earning twice as much as infantry due to the higher expenses associated with their horses and equipment. These troops were called the jund, descendants of Arab tribesmen who had participated in the Muslim conquest of the Maghreb. They often rebelled against the Aghlabid regime.

In 789, Ali ibn Abi Talib's descendant Idris ibn Abdallah fled from the Hejaz and arrived in Tangier after the failed revolt against the Abbasids in the Battle of Fakhkh. He later moved to Walili and founded the city of Fez in the same year. He founded the Hashemite Idrisid dynasty, which established control over modern-day Morocco and western Algeria. The Idrisid dynasty played an important role in the early Islamization of the area, and contributed to an increase in Arab migration and Arabization in major urban centers of the western Maghreb. Several Shia Arabs rapidly flocked to Fez, Arabizing the region. Fez experienced large waves of Arab migration, including one which involved 800 Arabs from Al-Andalus in 818 and one which involved 2,000 Arab families from Ifriqiya in 824.

At the beginning of the 10th century, several Ismaili Shia refugees from the Abbasid Caliphate settled among the Kutama Berbers of present-day Algeria. In 893, an Arab Shia missionary known as Abu Abdallah al-Shi'i arrived in the Maghreb from Yemen, who subsequently converted the Kutama of northeastern Algeria to Ismaili Shi'ism. These came under the rule of the Fatimid dynasty, who organized an army to fight the Sunni Aghlabid dynasty of Ifriqiya. After numerous battles against the Aghlabids, the Fatimids emerged victorious in 909 and conquered Ifriqiya, establishing the Fatimid Caliphate.

These Arab political entities, in addition to the Salihids and Fatimids, were influential in encouraging Arabization by attracting Arab migrants and by promoting Arab culture. In addition, disturbances and political unrest in the Mashriq compelled the Arabs to migrate to the Maghreb in search of security and stability. Arab immigration from the Mashriq to the Maghreb increased during periods of unrest and disorder.

==== Arab tribes in the Maghreb (9th century) ====
By the 3rd century AH (9th century CE), there were numerous Arab tribes in the Maghreb. According to al-Ya'qubi, in the mountains near Cyrenaica were the Arab tribes of Azd, Lakhm, Judham, al-Sadaf, and other Yemenite tribes on the eastern mountain, and Ghassan, Judham, Azd, Tujayb and others on the western mountain. In Waddan, there was a group that claimed to be Yemenite, and in Zawila, there were Arabs from the region of Khurasan and the cities of Basra and Kufa.

In Kairouan, there were Arabs from Quraysh and other tribes within the groupings of Mudar, Rabi'a and Qahtan. In nearby Al-Jazira, there were Arabs from Banu Adi and other groups. In Satfura, there were people from Quraysh and Quda'a, in Baja there were people from Banu Hashim, and in Majjana there were people from Diyar Rabi'a.

In al-Zab, in its capital Tobna, there was Quraysh, and other Arabs. In Sétif, there were tribesmen from Banu Asad ibn Khuzaymah. In Bilizma, the population consisted of tribesmen from Banu Tamim. Al-Ya'qubi's information does not include the whole Maghreb, such as the western Maghreb where the Idrisids arrived with Arab tribes and encouraged other Arabs to arrive.

=== Banu Hilal and Banu Sulaym (11th–12th century) ===
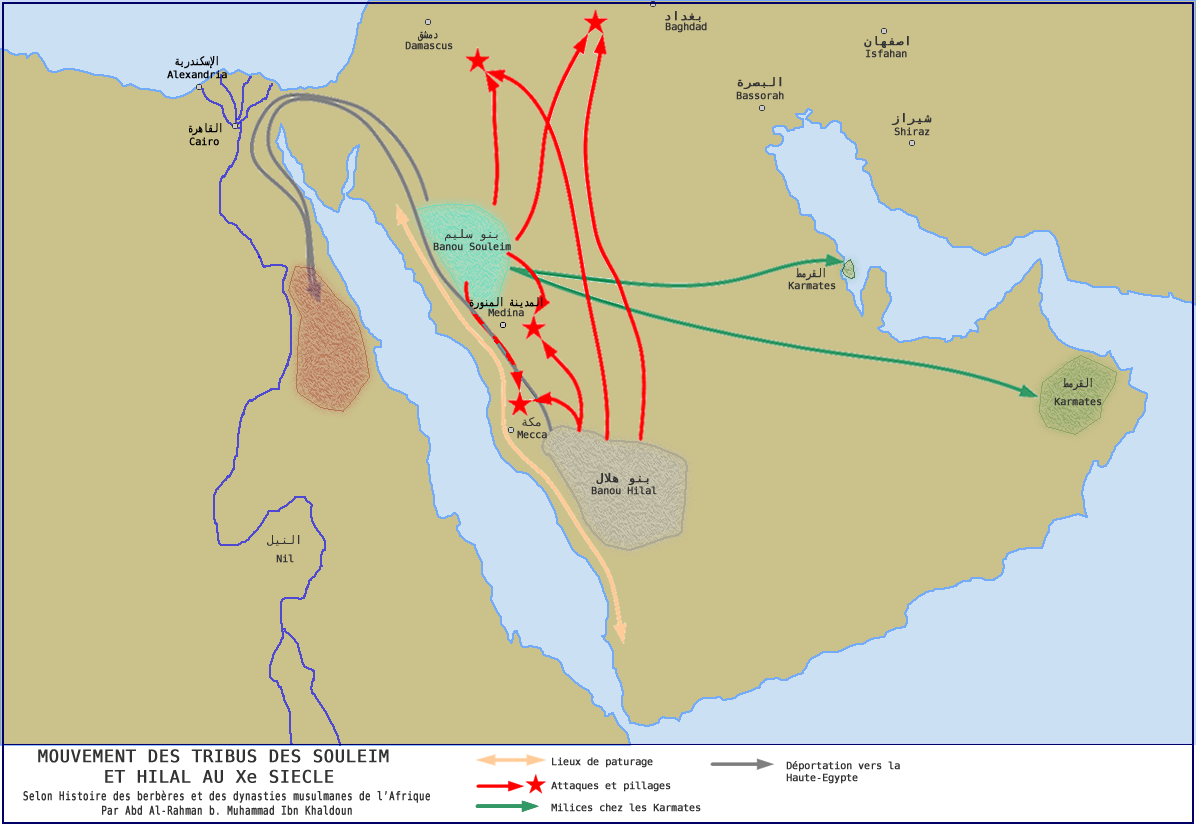
Migration routes of Banu Hilal and Banu Sulaym from the Arabian Peninsula to Egypt

The 11th century witnessed the most significant wave of Arab migration, surpassing all previous movements. According to traditional narratives like those pushed by Ibn Khaldun, this event unfolded when the Zirid dynasty of Ifriqiya proclaimed its independence from the Fatimid Caliphate of Egypt. In retribution against the Zirids, the Fatimids dispatched large Bedouin Arab tribes, mainly the Banu Hilal and Banu Sulaym, to defeat the Zirids and settle in the Maghreb. These tribes followed a nomadic lifestyle and were originally from the Hejaz and Najd.

To encourage the Banu Hilal and Banu Sulaym to migrate to the Maghreb, the Fatimid caliph provided each tribesman with a camel and financial support and assisted them in crossing from the eastern to the westwen bank of the Nile River. The harsh drought and subsequent economic crisis in Egypt at the time further motivated these tribes to relocate to the Maghreb, which had a better economic situation at the time. The Fatimid caliph instructed them to rule the Maghreb instead of the Zirid emir Al-Mu'izz and told them "I have given you the Maghrib and the rule of al-Mu'izz ibn Balkīn as-Sanhājī the runaway slave. You will want for nothing." and told Al-Mu'izz "I have sent you horses and put brave men on them so that God might accomplish a matter already enacted".

However, many modern historians now reject this narrative as a piece of propaganda that the Fatimids constructed capitalising on the victories of the Banu Hilal to bolster their own image.

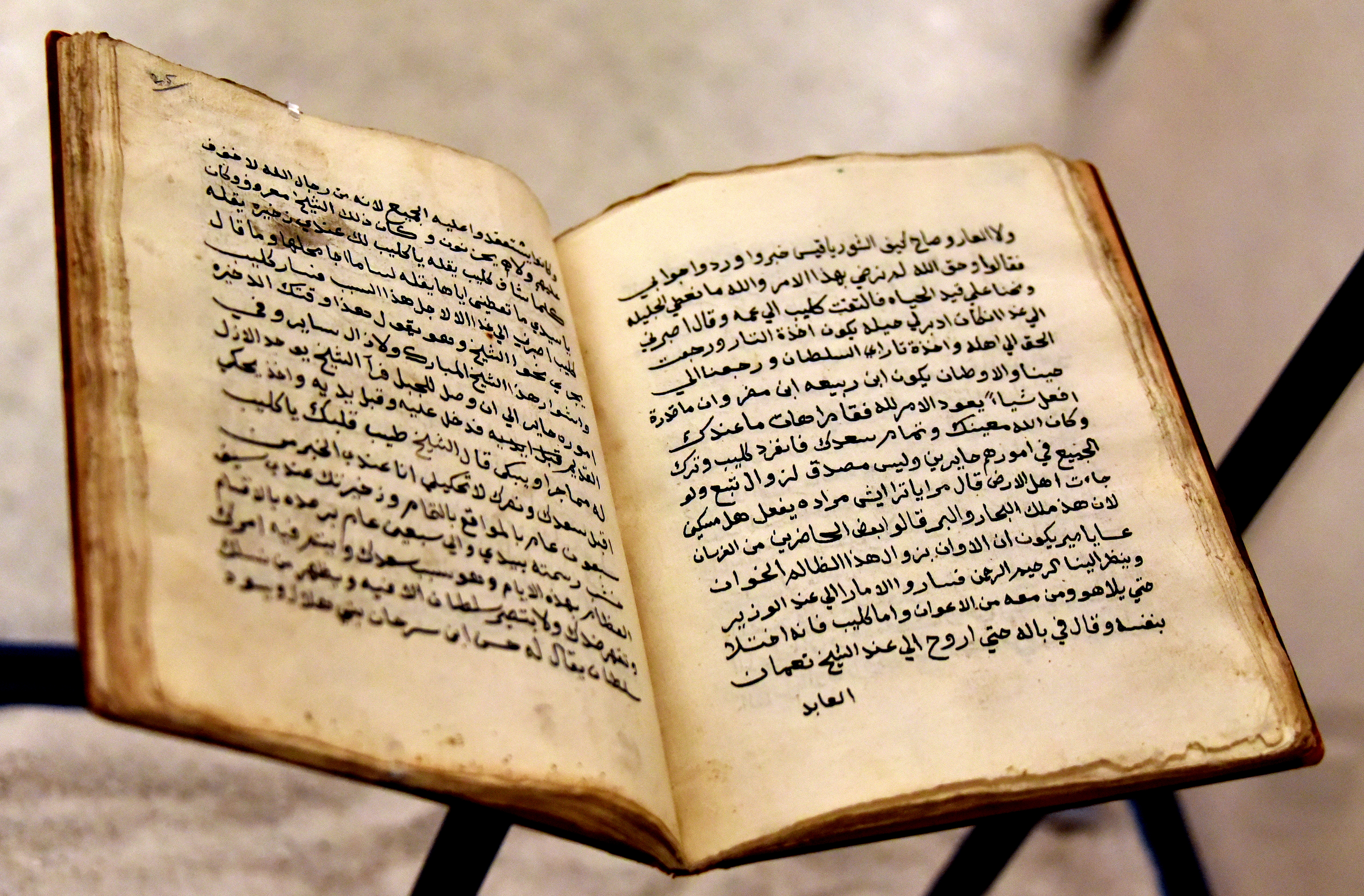
Arabic manuscript of the orally transmitted epic poem about the Bedouin Banu Hilal, by Hussein Al-Ulaimi, 1849 CE, origin unknown

Upon their arrival in Cyrenaica, the Arab nomads discovered that the region was almost empty of its inhabitants, with only a few Zenata Berbers remaining, most of whom had been largely destroyed by Al-Mu'izz.

Estimates of the number of people involved in the Hilalian migration vary considerably among historians. Gabriel Camps estimated the number of warriors at several tens of thousands, while other estimates range from 50,000 people leaving Egypt to 150,000–200,000 migrants, including approximately 50,000 warriors. The figure of 50,000 warriors is also given by Leo Africanus, who based his account on the medieval chronicler Ibn Rachu. Cyrenaica was subsequently settled by the Banu Sulaym, while the Banu Hilal continued their westward expansion.

According to the Encyclopédie berbère, the Banu Hilal, Banu Sulaym and Banu Maqil together numbered no more than 100,000 Arabs in the Maghreb. Estimates for the total number of Arab nomads who migrated to the Maghreb during the 11th century range from around 250,000 to as many as 1,000,000 people, including the Banu Hilal and Banu Sulaym, according to Idris El Hareir. Maya Shatzmiller estimates the total population of the Maghreb at approximately 5,000,000 at the time.

The Banu Sulaym settled in Cyrenaica while the Hilalians continued their advance west. The influx of Arab tribes to Cyrenaica caused the region to become the most Arab place in the Arab world after the interior of Arabia. According to Ibn Khaldun, the Arab tribes were accompanied by their families and stock. They settled in the Maghreb after engaged in numerous battles with the Berbers, such as the Battle of Haydaran. The Zirids abandoned Kairouan to take refuge on the coast where they survived for a century. The Banu Hilal and Banu Sulaym spread on the high plains of Constantine where they gradually obstructed the Qal'at Bani Hammad as they had done to Kairouan a few decades ago. From there, they gradually gained control over the high plains of Algiers and Oran. In the second half of the 12th century, they went to the Moulouya valley and the Atlantic coast in the western Maghreb to areas such as Doukkala.

They heavily transformed the culture of the Maghreb into Arab culture, and spread nomadism in areas where agriculture was previously dominant. It played a major role in spreading Bedouin Arabic to rural areas such as the countryside and steppes, and as far as the southern areas near the Sahara. In addition, they destroyed the Berber Zirid state and most of its cities, sparing only the Mediterranean coastal strip at al-Mahdiyya, and deeply weakened the neighboring Hammadid dynasty and the Zenata. Their influx was a major factor in the linguistic, cultural, genetic and ethnic Arabization of the Maghreb. According to Ibn Khaldun, the lands ravaged by Banu Hilal invaders had become desertified and turned into completely arid desert. The journey of Banu Hilal is recounted in the Arabic oral poem of Sirat Bani Hilal.

The effect that the Hilalian migration had on North Africa is a source of controversy. The traditional view is that the Hilalian migration marked the triumph of nomadism over civilisation. However, this view has been challenged by recent studies. For example, the French historian Jean Poncet argued that the Zirids already had been weakened by internal factors before while the French Marxist historian Claude Cahen argues that the Hilalian migration was part of a wider decentralization and "bedouinisation" in the 10th and 11th centuries which affected the entire Islamic World.

Some sources estimate that approximately 1 million Arab nomads migrated to the Maghreb during the 11th century. Historian Mármol Carvajal states that over a million Hilalians migrated to the Maghreb in the 11th century, an estimation he attributes to Ibn Al-Raquiq, who died 2 decades before the migrations. In the 19th century, Ernest Carette used Mármol Carvajal's accounts to estimate that the Arab population in the 16th century was 4,000,000 individuals. According to Charles-André Julien, a specialist in North African history, the Hilalian invasion was "the most important event of the entire medieval period in the Maghrib".

=== Almohad and Marinid era (12th–15th century) ===
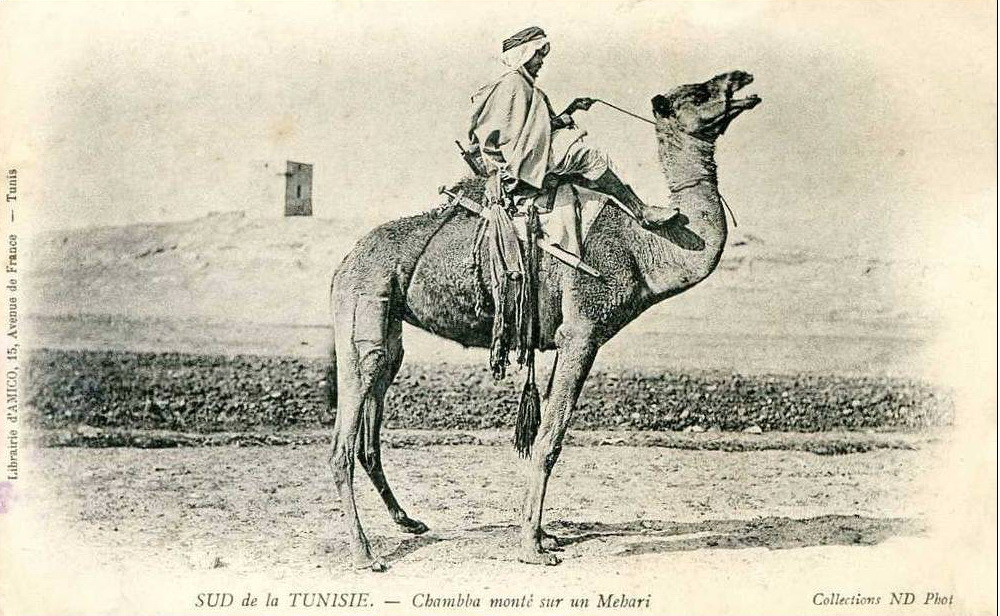
Chaamba riding a camel in southern Tunisia, c. 1934.

To weaken resistance by Arab tribes in Ifriqiya, the Almohad ruler Abd al-Mu'min transferred them to Morocco in large numbers and settled them in the Atlantic plains in the 12th century. The region was formerly inhabited by the Barghawata tribal group, however this area was largely destroyed and depopulated by the Almoravids in their war against the heretic Barghawata, and it was depopulated again by an Almohad expedition in 1149–1150 and again in 1197–1198 to suppress revolts against them in the region. The Almohads helped the Arab tribes pass the barriers of the Atlas Mountains, and accelerated their expansion to Morocco to complete the nomadic Bedouin predominance over the lowlands of the Maghreb as far as the Atlantic coastal plains. The Arab tribes increasingly played an important role in the politics of the Almohad Empire.

The Almohad government thus helped the Arabs to overcome the barriers of the Atlas mountains, and accelerated their expansion into Morocco to complete the nomads' predominance over the lowlands of the Maghrib as far as the Atlantic. The appearance of the Arabs added to the complexity of the ethnic composition of Morocco, and introduced a significant non-Berber element to the population. The Arabs also increased pasture lands at the expense of agriculture, which gradually became confined to the mountains.

— Roland Oliver,

Abd al-Mu'min expected opposition from the Masmuda to whom he was a stranger, so he gained Arab support to secure the succession of his son. With the decline of the Almohad army, the Arab nomads became the most powerful force in the Moroccan plains, and no ruler could have held authority there without their support. The later 'Alawite dynasty came to power in the 17th century with the help of these Arab tribes, who they mobilized against the powerful Berber principality of Dila'iyyah.

Under the Marinid dynasty (1244–1465), the Arabs grew in importance in Morocco. Due to the lack of Zenata supporters, they welcomed the support of Arab nomads who already began to penetrate into the country under the Almohads. The Zenata were heavily assimilated into Arab culture and the Marinid Makhzan (government) composed of both Arabs and Zenata. This led to the expansion of Arab tribes into Morocco where they settled in the plains, and many Berber groups were Arabized. Under the Marinids, Arabic became both the common and official language. Like the Marinids, the Zayyanid dynasty of the Kingdom of Tlemcen had to rely on Arab nomads for soldiers.

=== Ma'qil, Beni Hassan, and the Char Bouba war (13th–17th century) ===
The Ma'qilis also entered the Maghreb during this wave of Arabian tribal immigration in the 11th century. They later allied with the Banu Hilal and entered under their protection. They adapted to the climatic desert conditions of the Maghreb, discovering the same way of life as in the Arabian Peninsula. In the 13th century, the Ma'qilis occupied southern Algeria, including the oasis towns of Tuat and Gourara. For some authors, at this point, the Ma'qil had already split into many tribes in the Maghreb and had given rise to the Beni Hassan along with other Ma'qili tribes.

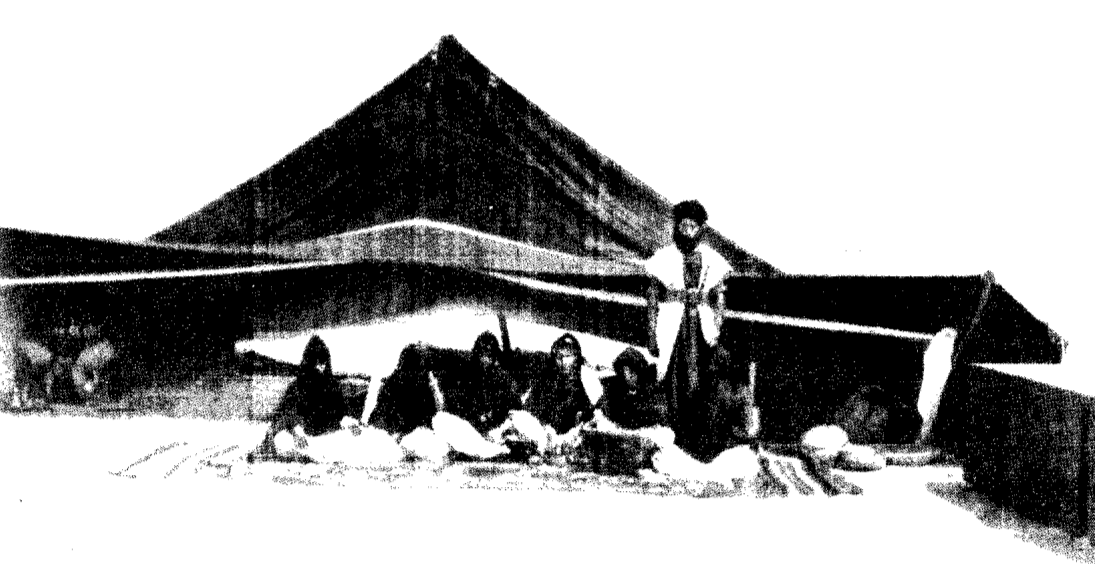
Saharan family c. 1970 to 1974

The Beni Hassan expanded southwest and occupied Sanhaja lands in the 13th century after invading and defeating the Berber confederation. The Sanhaja has long had to pay tribute to the nomadic Bedouin Hassani invaders. The invasion was quick and effective and happened around the year 1250, by the end of the Almohad Caliphate. Additionally, the Beni Hassan dominated the valleys of the Moulouya, Draa, Sous, as well as the Tafilalt oasis region.

Historical accounts report that these Hassani communities enriched themselves by collecting tolls from trade caravans and extorting farming and herding villages settled in the oases. This took place during the Char Bouba war in modern-day Western Sahara and Mauritania from 1644 to 1674, which after decades of confrontations ended up completely Arabizing the native Berber population, destroying their language and culture and giving rise to the contemporary Sahrawi people. The Arab nomads controlled the entire territory of present-day Mauritania ever since.

The Moorish Sahara is the western extremity of the Arab World. Western it certainly is, some districts further west than Ireland, yet in its way of life, its culture, its literature and in many of its social customs, it has much in common with the heart lands of the Arab East, in particular with the Hijaz and Najd and parts of the Yemen

— Harry T. Norris,

=== Andalusi refugees (15th–17th century) ===
Starting from the late 15th century, a new wave of Arabs arrived as refugees from Al-Andalus in response to the persecution they faced under Christian Spanish rule after the fall of Granada in the Reconquista in 1492. In 1609, Spain implemented the Expulsion of the Moriscos, which aimed to forcibly remove all Muslims from the Iberian Peninsula, expelling about 275,000 to 300,000 of them. Accustomed to urban life, they settled in urban cities in the Maghreb, including Fez, Rabat and Tangier in Morocco, Tlemcen and Constantine in Algeria, and Kairouan, Tunis and Bizerte in Tunisia. They brought with them the urban dialects of Andalusi Arabic, which they introduced to the existing Bedouin Arabic dialects of the Maghreb. This event greatly increased the process of Arabization in the Maghreb from the 15th to the 17th century. There were several Arab tribes in Al-Andalus, of which the most prominent were Qays, Kilab, Uqayl, Mudar, Rabi'a, Yaman, Tayy, Lakhm, Judham, Amilah, and Quda'a.

== Impact ==
=== Arabization ===
A major effect of the Arab migrations to the Maghreb was the Arabization of its population. With the large-scale arrival of Arab migrants, the indigenous Berber population underwent a process of Arabization, in which they adopted Arab culture and language. The early wave of migration prior to the 11th century contributed to the Berber adoption of Arab culture. Furthermore, the Arabic language spread during this period and drove Latin into extinction in the cities. The Arabization took place around Arab major towns through the influence of Arabs in the cities and rural areas surrounding them. The hypothesis that the Punic language survived and facilitated Arabization can be dismissed. Medieval sources make no mention of the existence of a Punic language at the time of the Arabs' arrival; indeed, no other linguistic reality besides Berber (and Latin in the Romanized and Christianized urban world) is mentioned in Arabic sources. According to Patrick Manning, within three centuries of the Hilalian migration, "the population was principally Arab in identity and language rather than Berber."

The migration of Banu Hilal and Banu Sulaym in the 11th century had a much greater influence on the process of Arabization than the migrations beforehand. It played a major role in spreading Bedouin Arabic to rural areas such as the countryside and steppes, and as far as the southern areas near the Sahara. It also heavily transformed the culture of the Maghreb into Arab culture, and spread Bedouin nomadism in areas where agriculture was previously dominant. These Bedouin tribes hastened and significantly intensified the Arabization process, as a substantial part of the Berber population was gradually assimilated by the new settlers and had to share with them pasturelands and seasonal migration routes. By the 15th century, the area of modern-day Tunisia had already been almost completely Arabized.

This resulted in the development of Maghrebi Arabic, a variety which traces its origins to the Bedouin Arabic varieties that were introduced to the Maghreb by Hilalian tribes in the 11th century, which eventually became widely spoken by the vast majority of Maghrebis. The diverse linguistic landscape of the Maghreb led to the choice of Banu Hilal's Arabic as the lingua franca of the Maghreb.

=== Conversion to Islam ===
The Umayyad Caliphate played a significant role in converting the population of the Maghreb to Islam. Umayyad campaigns into the Maghreb were highly successful. In 705, Musa ibn Nusayr launched a major campaign into the western Maghreb, capturing most of its cities. This allowed him to impose his authority over the entire Maghreb, where he continued to spread Islam and the Arabic language through missionary activity. He chose seventeen religious scholars to convert the locals. Many people became Muslims at the hands of these scholars and the inhabitants of the Maghreb gradually converted to Islam. Caliph Umar ibn Abd al-Aziz sent to the governor of Ifriqiya Ismail ibn Abdallah all scholars and men of culture, who were ordered to teach the religion of Islam. They were distributed around the regions of the Maghreb. In less than one century, the great majority of Christians converted to Islam with "great zeal that they sought martyrdom", and the final conversions took place in the first two centuries after the hijrah. The Berbers were the only people to be incorporated into the Umayyad armies and to have converted to Islam on such a large scale.

=== Displacement ===
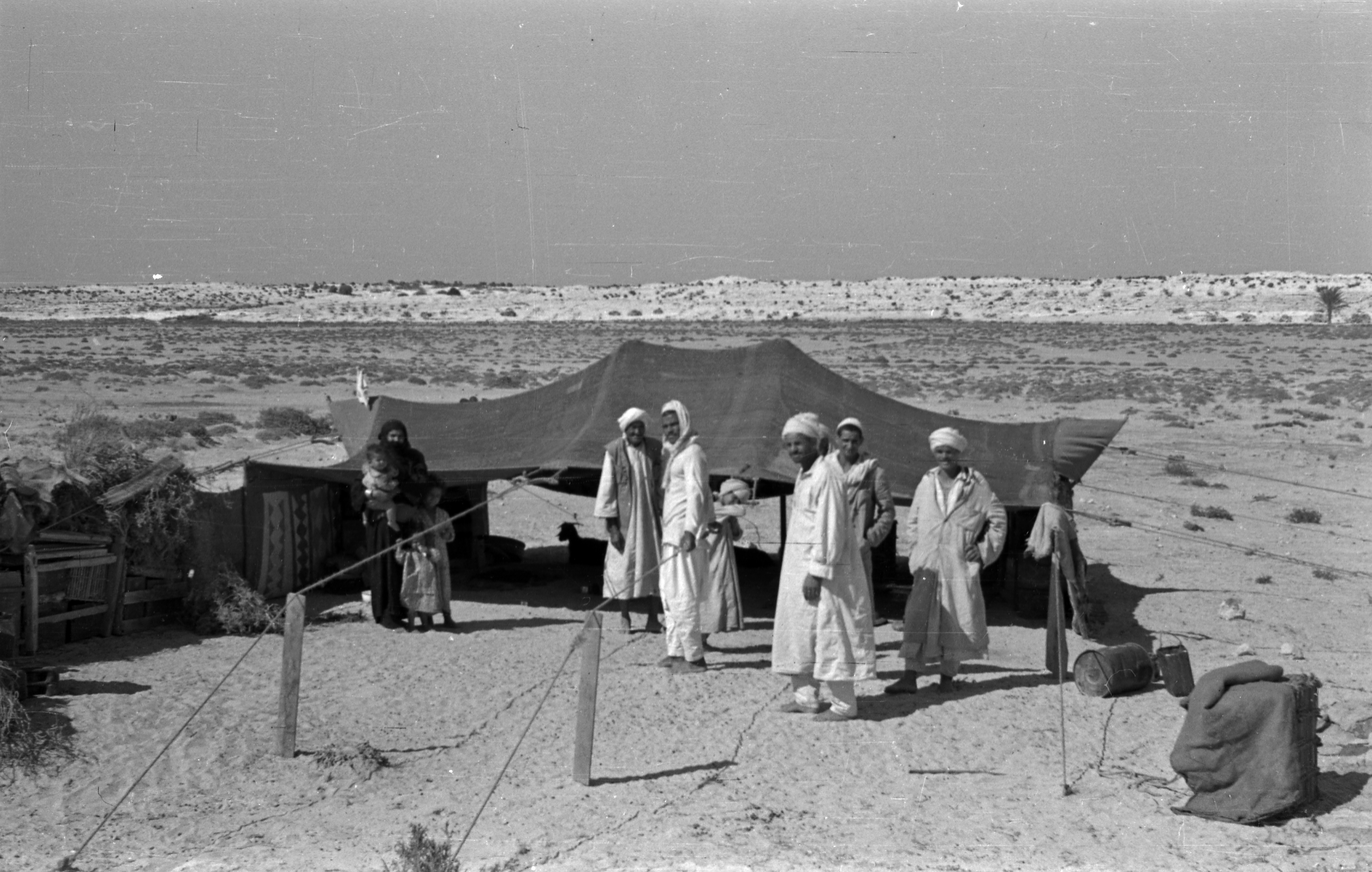
A group of Bedouins in Libya

The influx of Arab tribes during the 11th century into the Maghreb brought about significant demographic and economic changes. Over a protracted period, Arab nomads gradually displaced Berber farmers from their best lands and subordinated them. Berbers fled to the mountains, while those who remained sought their protection and underwent gradual Arabization. As Arab nomads spread, the territories and boundaries of the local Berber tribes were relocated and shrunk. The Zenata were displaced westward, while the Kabyles were forced to the north. The Berber language persisted in the mountains whereas the plains were Arabized. This led to the displacement of Berber languages by Arabic as the lingua franca of the coastal plains of the Maghreb. This linguistic shift occurred as the increasing influx of powerful Arab tribes achieved cultural and linguistic dominance over the coastal plains, effectively transforming the region into a "cultural extension of the Arab East". Meanwhile, Berber languages and culture remained confined to the mountains and desert regions.

Additionally, the Bedouins contributed to the desertification and nomadization of the Maghreb. The Banu Hilal conquered land which they largely devastated, causing a decline in its cultivation. Nomadism increased during this time. According to Ibn Khaldun, the lands "ravaged" by Banu Hilal invaders had become desertified and turned into completely arid desert. The arrival of the Banu Hilal, followed by the Banu Sulaym in the 12th century, broke the balance between nomads and sedentary populations in favor of the nomads. For strategic reasons, the Almohads gave over the Atlantic plains of the western Maghreb to the Arab nomads.

=== Genetics ===
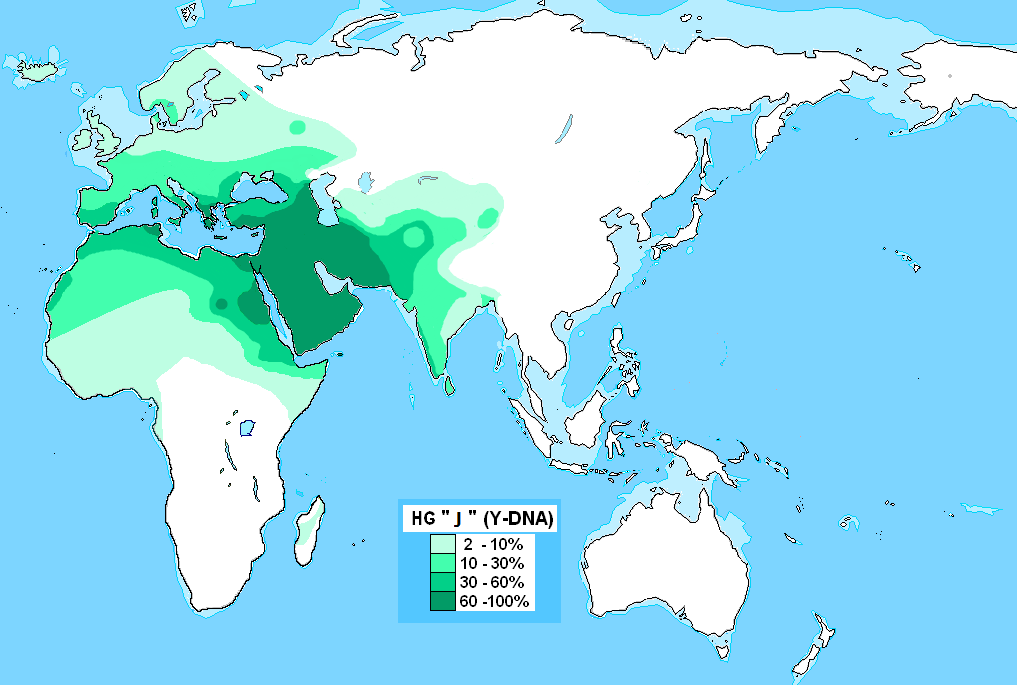
Distribution of Haplogroup J (Y-DNA)

According to Bekada et al. (2013), the Arabization of North Africa was primarily a process of cultural assimilation of the indigenous Berber population. A study from 2002 revealed that the second most-frequent Haplogroup in the Maghreb was Haplogroup J1-M267 (Eu10), which originated in the Middle East (the highest frequency of 30%–62.5% has been observed in Muslim Arab populations in the Middle East). The Arabization and Islamization of Northwest Africa, beginning in the 7th century AD, were largely cultural processes rather than the result of extensive genetic replacement, the study found out that the majority of Eu10 chromosomes in the Maghreb are due to the recent gene flow caused by the Arab migrations to the Maghreb in the first millennium CE. Both southern Qahtanite and northern Adnanite Arabs contributed to the diverse ethnic mix of the Maghreb. Therefore, it has been established that the Eu10 chromosome pool in the Maghreb originates not only from early Neolithic migrations but also from recent expansions of Arab tribes from Arabia. The results of a more recent study from 2017 suggested that the Arab migrations to the Maghreb were mainly a demographic process that heavily implied gene flow and remodeled the genetic structure of the Maghreb, rather than a mere cultural replacement as claimed by older studies. Haplogroup J1-M267 accounts for around 30% of Maghrebis and is assumed to have spread out of the Arabia Peninsula into North Africa, second after E1b1b1b which accounts for 45% of Maghrebis. According to a study from 2021, the highest frequency of the Middle Eastern component ever observed in North Africa so far was observed in the Arabs of Wesletia in Tunisia, who had a Middle Eastern component frequency of 71.8%.

According to a study from 2004, Haplogroup J (which includes various subclades corresponding to Anatolian, Balkan, and Middle Eastern migrations) had a frequency of 35% in Algerians (20 samples) behind haplogroup E (65%), 34.2% in Tunisians (73 samples) behind haplogroup E (55.2%), 15.9% (44 samples) to 20.4% (49 samples) behind haplogroup E (from 72.7% to 75.7%) in "Moroccan Arabs". Haplogroup J comprises several subclades, such as J-M172, J-M267, and J-M102. J-M172 and J-M267 point to expansions from the Middle East into Europe that most likely occurred during and after the Neolithic period; the former illustrates population expansions originating in the southern Balkans, while the J-M267 marker is thought to indicate an expansion from the Middle East into East Africa and Europe—specifically the YCAIIa-22/YCAIIb-22 motif, which points to a migration of Arab peoples from the southern Middle East to North Africa. Although subsequent cultural expansions from the Middle East—such as the Islamic expansion—may have introduced new lineages into North Africa and fostered admixture between the two regions, the results indicate that the bulk of the current North African genetic component predates these events.

== Contemporary demographics ==
=== Arab tribes ===
These Arab tribes settled in the Maghreb and emerged into several contemporary sub-tribes. The most notable Arab tribes of Morocco include Abda, Ahl Rachida, Azwafit, Banu Ma'qil, Banu Tamim, Beni Ahsen, Beni 'Amir, Beni Guil, Beni Ḥassān, Banu Hilal, Beni Khirane, Beni Mathar, Beni Moussa, Banu Sulaym, Beni Zemmour, Chaouia, Doukkala, Hyayna, Khlout, Mzab, Oulad Delim, Oulad Tidrarin, Oulad Zyan, Rahamna, Sless, Zaër, Zyayda. There are several tribes of Bedouin origin throughout Tunisia, such as Banu Hudhayl and Shammar, however they are not very nomadic nowadays and they mostly live in towns. The major Arab tribes in Libya are Qadhadhfa, Magarha, Warfalla, Firjan, Saʿada and Murabtin, Masamir, Zuwayya, Awlad Busayf, Awlad Sulayman and Abaydat. The most well known Arab tribes of Algeria are Chaamba, Dhouaouda, Doui-Menia, Ghenanma, Beni Hassan, Ouled Djerir, Awlad Sidi Shaykh, Banu Tamim, Banu Hilal, Banu Sulaym, Thaaliba, Ouled Nail, Beni Amer, Hamyan and many more. Bedouin tribes in Algeria primarily live in the Algerian Desert.

=== Arabic dialects ===
Geographical distribution of the varieties of Arabic

Maghrebi Arabic, spoken by the vast majority of Maghrebis, traces its roots back to the Bedouin Arabic varieties that were introduced to the Maghreb in the 11th century by Banu Hilal and Banu Sulaym, who effectively Arabized substantial parts of the region.

The Arab migrations led to the emergence of Bedouin dialects in the Maghreb, commonly known as Hilalian dialects. These dialects are spoken in various regions, including the Atlantic plains in Morocco, the High Plains and Sahara regions in Algeria, the Sahel in Tunisia, and the regions of Tripolitania and Cyrenaica in Libya. The Bedouin dialects can be classified into four primary varieties: Sulaymi dialects (Libya and southern Tunisia), Eastern Hilalian dialects (central Tunisia and eastern Algeria), Central Hilalian dialects (south and central Algeria), Ma'qili dialects (western Algeria and Morocco) and Hassaniya dialects (Mauritania, Western Sahara and southern Morocco; also classified as Maqil). In Morocco, Bedouin Arabic dialects are spoken in plains and in recently founded cities such as Casablanca. Thus, the city Arabic dialect shares with the Bedouin dialects gal 'to say' (qala); they also represent the bulk of modern urban dialects, such as those of Oran and Algiers.

=== Demographics ===
The majority of present-day Arabic speakers in the Maghreb are predominantly of Berber origin, having become linguistically and culturally Arabized over time. A relatively small number of Arab settlers contributed to the Arabization of a predominantly indigenous Berber population. Genetic studies confirms that Arabization is more a matter of acculturation of the local Berber population than a process of new settlement. From this perspective, the majority of present-day Arabic speakers are primarily of Berber descent but identify as Arab because they are Arab linguistically and culturally.

Today, the Arabs make up the majority of the population of the countries of the Maghreb, accounting for 70% to 80% of Algeria, 92% to 97% of Libya, 67% to 70% of Morocco and 98% of Tunisia.

== See also ==
- Arab migrations to the Levant
- History of the Arabs
