= Battle of Sétif =

1153 battle between the Almohads and Arab tribes

Date	27 April 1153
Location	Sétif
Result	Almohad victory

Belligerents
Almohads	Banu Riyah; Banu Hilal; Banu Adi; Athbaj; Zughba

Commanders and leaders
Abd al-Mu'min; Abdullah ibn Omar; Sa'd Allah ibn Yahya	Muhrez ibn Ziyad; Djebora ibn Kamil; Hasan ibn Tha'lab; Isa ibn Hasan

Strength
30,000	80,000

Casualties and losses
Unknown	Heavy

The Battle of Sétif (Arabic: معركة سطيف) took place on April 27, 1153, AD, in the region of Sétif in present-day Algeria. it was a battle between a coalition of Arab tribes and the Almohads led by the caliph Abd al-Mu'min. The result of the battle was a victory for the Almohads.

== Battle ==
On his departure from the city of Bejaia, the caliph Abd al-Mu'min realized that an innumerable mass of Hilalians was advancing against him. So he quickly equipped more than 30,000 horsemen led by Abdullah ibn Omar Al-Hinlafi and Sa'ad Allah ibn Yahya. According to Ibn Khaldun, the head of the Almohad army was Abd Allah, son of Abd al-Mumin. This army dragged the Hilalian Arabs, twice as many, into the mountains on the Sétif side in its wake, then turned around and charged them. After an intense fighting, the Hilalians were defeated and were forced to route and abandon their women, children and their wealth to the hands of the Almohads.

== Aftermath ==
The Almohad army brought the booty to the caliph Abd al-Mu'min who distributed it among his companions. The caliph decided to keep the women and children in good custody and assigned his eunuchs to take care of their needs. Later on, with the caliph arrival to Marrakesh, he ordered to resettle the women and children of the Arabs in large settlements in Marrakesh and offered them huge pensions. Soon after, the Arab Hilalians were informed of the generosity of the caliph Abd al-Mumin, and saw the opportunity to reunite with their families, thereby agreeing to settle down in Marrakesh under the rule of the Almohad caliph. Furthermore, Abd al-Mumin offered the Banu Hilal huge sums and managed to secure their help in designating his son Mohammed as his heir apparent in 1156. Those Hilalians were also incorporated into the Almohad army and participated in the campaign to bring Ifriqiya under the Almohad control in 1160.
