= Siege of Kelibia =

- Part of Sicilian invasion of Ifriqiya
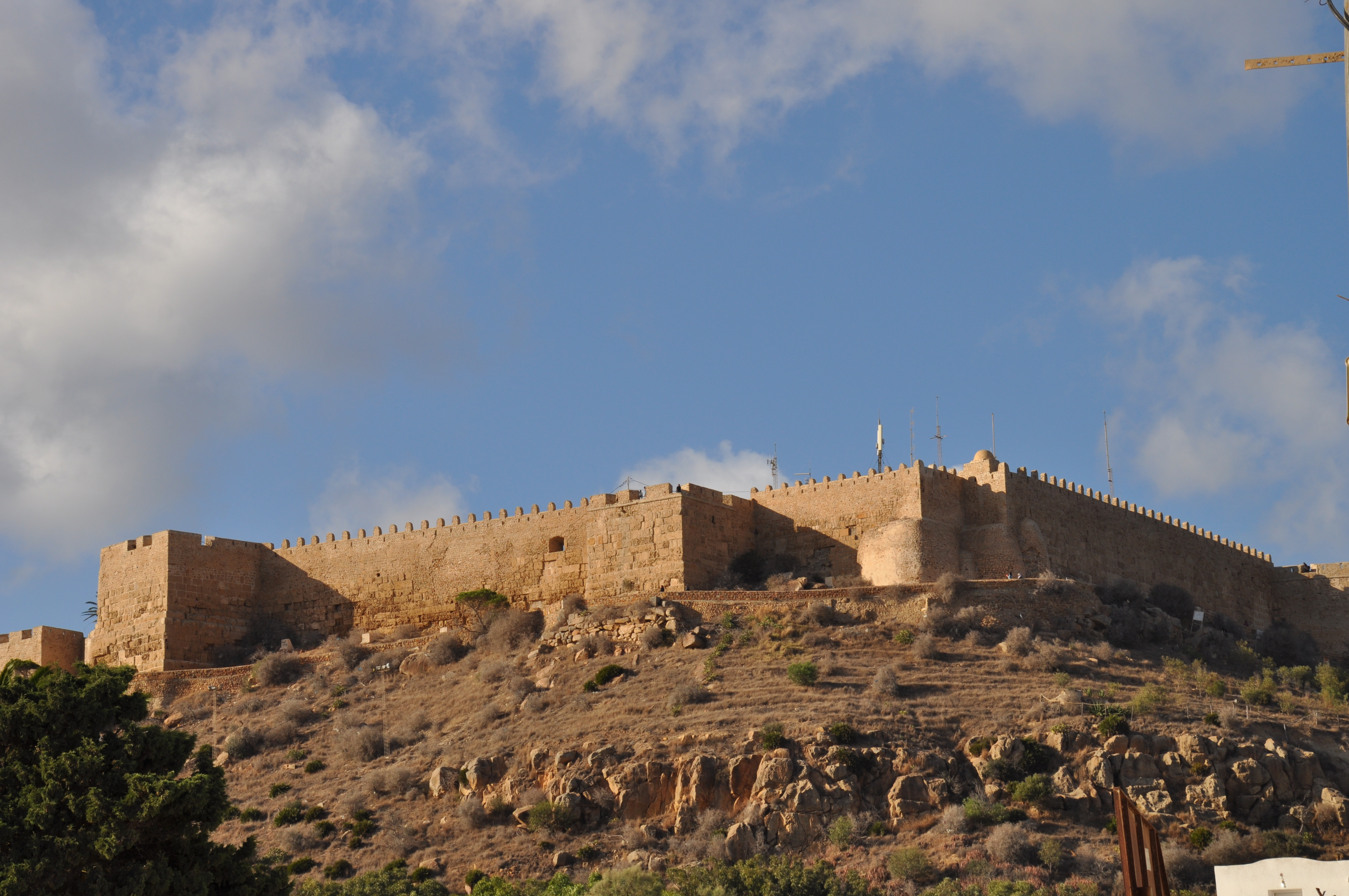
- Fortress of Kelibia
Date	1148
Location	Kelibia, Ifriqiya (actual Tunisia)
Result	Hilalian victory

Belligerents
Banu Hilal	Kingdom of Sicily

Commanders and leaders
Muhriz ibn Ziyad	George of Antioch

Casualties and losses
	Mass losses

The Siege of Kelibia refers to the siege of the fortress of the coastal Ifriqiyan city of Kelibia by the troops of George of Antioch against the Hilalian Arabs in 1148.

== Context ==
Ifriqiya was in total disorder, scattered with small emirates torn apart by conflicts following the fall of the Zirid hegemony. Meanwhile, Roger II of Sicily's admiral, George of Antioch, captured one by one the coastal cities of present-day Tunisia, such as Sousse, Sfax, Gabes, and Mahdia. He then decided to focus his forces on capturing the fortress of Kelibia.

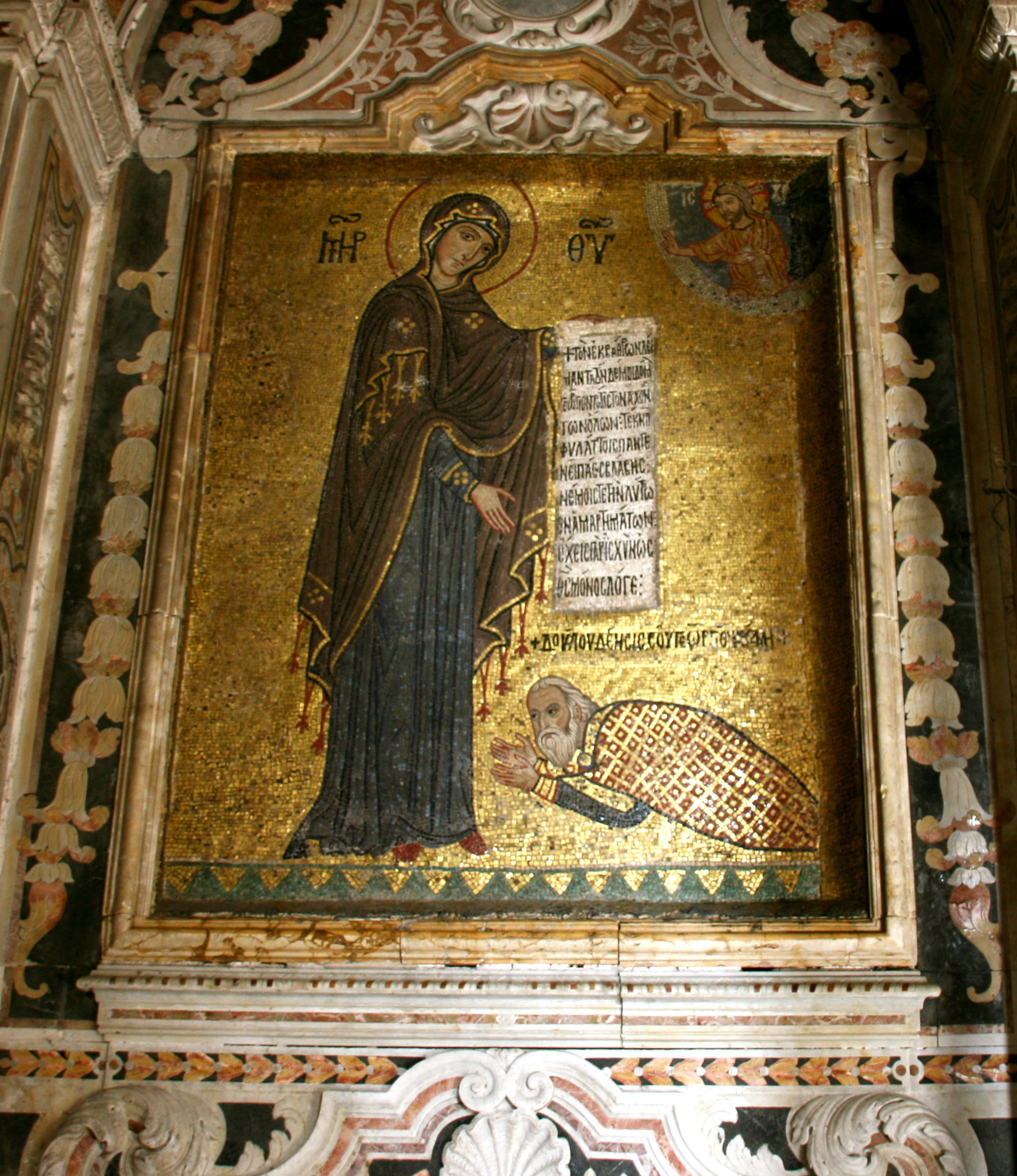
Mosaic depicting George of Antioch prostrating before the Virgin

== Events ==
After restoring calm among the conquered cities, George of Antioch led his fleet to the fortress. Upon learning the news, the Hilalian Arabs set out to defend the fort from the Sicilian attack and repelled the Norman assault so vigorously that George of Antioch's army had no choice but to retreat quickly, taking refuge in Mahdia and abandoning the siege of the fortress, having suffered heavy losses against the Arabs.

== Consequences ==
This defense allowed the fortress of Kelibia to remain independent from the domination of the Kingdom of Sicily over Ifriqiya, a fate that many other coastal cities did not escape. Around 1050, all the major coastal cities such as Gabès, Sfax, Mahdia, and Sousse paid tribute to Roger II, except for Tunis and Kelibia.

Map of Sicilian possessions in North Africa
