= Muhriz ibn Ziyad =

- Emir of Banu Hilal

Emir of Banu Hilal
- Reign: around 1150–1160
- Successor: none (fall of the Hilalian unity)
- Born: 12th century
- Died: 1160; Jabal al-Qarn, region of Kairouan
Names
- Muhriz Ibn Ziyad Ibn Fadegh ar-Riyahi al-Hilali
- House: Riyah tribe of Banu Hilal
- Father: Ziyad ibn Fadegh

Muhriz ibn Ziyad ar-Riyahi (in Arabic: محرز بن زياد الرياحي), also spelled Mahrez ben Ziad, was one of the emirs of the Banu Hilal tribe during its migration to North Africa. Known as the "Warlord of Carthage," he was recognized for his power among other Hilalian emirs.

== Biography ==
=== Early life ===
Muhriz ibn Ziyad, whose full name (nasab) is Muhriz ibn Ziyad ibn Fadegh ibn Ali ibn Hamdan ibn Riyah ibn Abi Rabiah ibn Nahik ibn Hilal ibn Amer ibn Sa'sa'a ibn Muawiya ibn Bakr ibn Hawazin ibn Mansur ibn Ikrimah ibn Khasafa ibn Qays Aylan ibn Mudar ibn Nizar ibn Ma'ad ibn Adnan, is from the family of Bani Fadegh, his grandfather, who himself is from the great family (later becoming an entire fraction), the Banu Ali, of the Riyah tribe of the Banu Hilal.

His date of birth is unknown, but he is believed to have been born around Gabes. He belonged to a family of emirs among the Riyah. The future emir grew up in a divided Ifriqiya and was trained in the art of combat.

=== Foundation of the Banu Ziyad Principality of Carthage ===
In the 11th century, after the death of Ali ben Yahya and the dissolution of the Zirid Emirate, Muhriz became the most powerful Arab emir of Ifriqya. He established the base of his troops in the "Moaqla," among the ruins of Carthage. He built earthen walls as fortifications; these were over 5 meters thick and studied by several archaeologists. He came into conflict with Kahroun ben Raouch, and a battle erupted around his improvised "donjon." The armies of Riyah, which he controlled, terrorized the inhabitants of Tunis, who, in retaliation, destroyed some of their camps.

The principality of the "Banu Ziyad of Carthage" is named after Muhriz's father, Ziyad, and is a branch of the Banu Fadegh. It is believed to have been founded around 1130. Muhriz maintained good relations with the Zirids of Mahdia, a relationship such that the emir responded to the calls of Hassan ibn Ali al-Ziri in his battles. He settled on the hill of Byrsa and became the leader of a large group of Arabs (taïfa).

Following tensions and anarchy in Ifriqiya, the Qadi of Tunis, Abu Mohamed Abd al-Mu'min, proposed to the people of Tunis that a Hilalian emir be their leader. However, a man in the crowd shouted, "No obedience to an Arab or a Guzz (Turk)," which sparked a new civil war, and the Qadi was expelled from the city.

Muhriz's army even managed to thwart an Almohad attack on Tunis, led by the son of Abd al-Mu'min.

=== Battle of Sétif and Legacy ===
Muhriz ibn Ziyad was the principal emir in the Battle of Sétif, where a significant part of the Riyah allied against the expansionism of the Almohads. They were routed by the armies of Abd al-Mu'min. Muhriz managed to escape and reform an army ready to confront the Almohads again.

According to al-Nuwairi, Muhriz ibn Ziyad commanded a "people" of 80,000 tents, and in 1155, he led another attack against the Almohads at the Battle of al-Qarn, near Kairouan. He continued the struggle against the Almohads until the end, when he was abandoned by the other Hilalian emirs and died in battle His body was brought to Abd Al-Mu'min and crucified in Kairouan. His head was then placed on a stake until it completely decomposed.
