= Murabitun =

Murābiṭūn (Arabic: مرابطون murābiṭūn) or murābiṭ (مرابط) may refer to

- Saʿada and Murabtin, a social class among the Arabized Amazigh Bedouins of the Maghreb
- Almoravid dynasty, a Sanhaja Berber dynasty
- Maravedí, a historic Iberian currency
- Marabout (marbūṭ), an Islamic "holy man" in the Maghreb
- Al-Mourabitoun, a Lebanese political movement founded in 1957
- Murabitun World Movement, an Islamic movement founded in the 1980s
- Al-Mourabitoun (militant group), an African Islamist group formed in 2013
- Murabitat, political activists at the Temple Mount in Jerusalem

== See also ==
- Ribat
