= Beni Amer =

Arab tribe in Algeria and Morocco

Beni Amer بني عامر
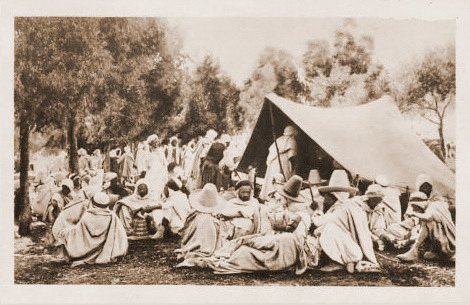
- Tribesmen of Beni Amer in the 19th century at Sidi Bel Abbes
- Ethnicity: Arab
- Location: Western Algeria and Morocco
- Parent tribe: Banu Hilal
- Language: Arabic
- Religion: Sunni Islam

Beni Amer (Arabic: بني عامر) is an Arab tribe mainly present in Algeria, as well as Morocco. They are originally from the Zughba branch of Banu Hilal. The Beni Amer occupied the region of western Algeria around Oran after a gradual migration.

== Origin ==
Beni Amer are a faction of the Zughba, one of the main branches of Banu Hilal, who originally lived in the region of Najd in the Arabian Peninsula. As part of the Arab migration to the Maghreb, Banu Hilal settled in the region in the 11th century after the Fatimids dispatched them along with Banu Sulaym and other Bedouin tribes to defeat the Zirids who rebelled against them.

To persuade the Banu Hilal and Banu Sulaym to migrate to the Maghreb, the Fatimid caliph gave each tribesman a camel and money and helped them cross from the east to the west bank of the Nile river. The severe drought in Egypt at the time also persuaded these tribes to migrate to the Maghreb, which had a better economic situation at the time. Sources estimated that the total number of Arab nomads who migrated to the Maghreb in the 11th century was at around 1 million Arabs.

Ibn Khaldun said that Beni Amer were a faction of the Arabs of Zughba and that they bear the name of their original tribal confederation, Banu Amir ibn Sasaa. The genealogical lineage of Banu Amir is as follows: Amer bin Zughba bin Hilal bin Amer bin Sa'sa' bin Mu'awiyah bin Bakr bin Hawazin bin Mansur bin Ikrima bin Khasafa bin Qays 'Aylan bin Mudar bin Nizar bin Ma'd bin Adnan. Leo Africanus (1483–1530) mentioned them in his Description de l'Afrique: "These Arabs live on the borders of Tlemcen and Oran and wander in the desert... they are paid by the king of Tlemcen. They are men of great bravery and are very rich. They have around 6,000 well quipped cavalry…".

== Location ==
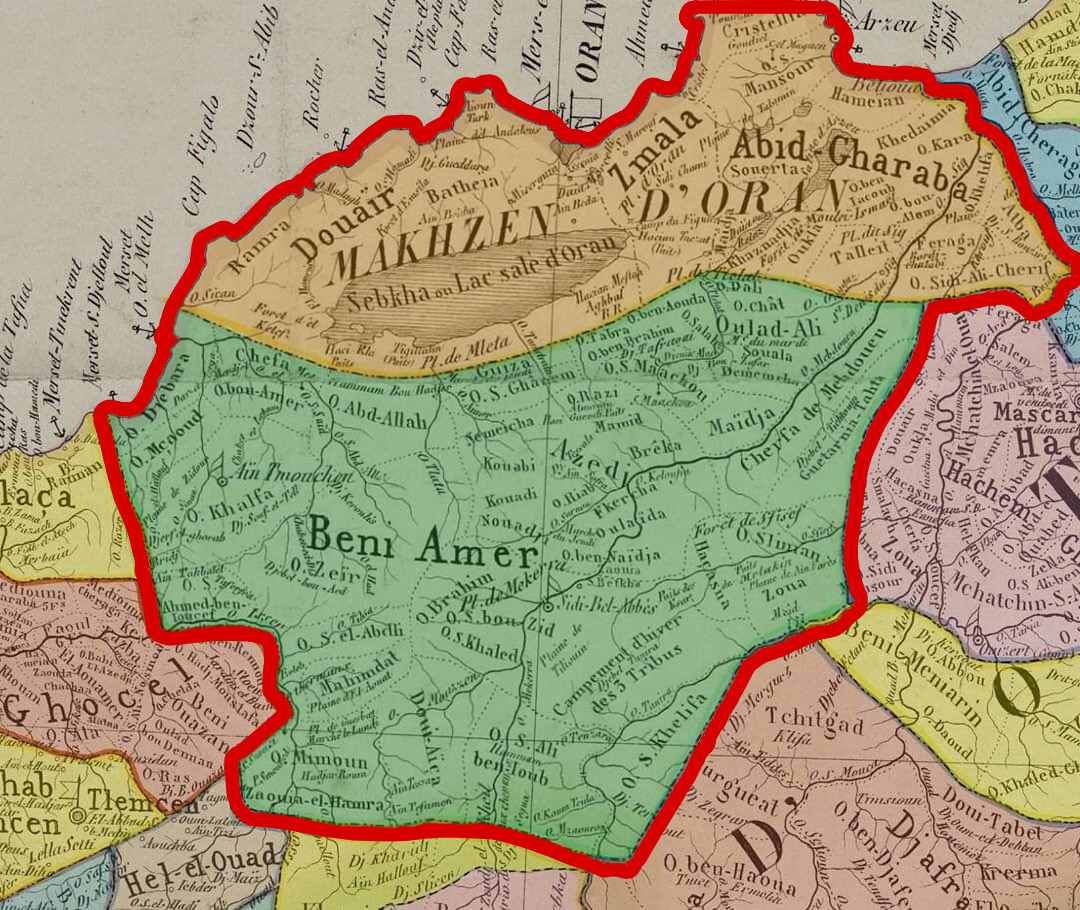
Map of areas under the control of Beni Amer in the 19th century

Beni Amer was divided into four groups in 1849 during French colonization of Algeria, Gheraba, Dahra, Cheraga and Ouled Nabet. There tribes inhabited Oran, Tessala, Aïn Temouchent, Beni Saf, Mostaganem and Sidi Bel Abbes.
