= Dhouaouda =

Dhouaouda الذواودة
- Ethnicity: Arab
- Location: High Plains, Algeria
- Parent tribe: Banu Hilal
- Language: Arabic
- Religion: Sunni Islam

Dhouaouda (Arabic: الذواودة, romanized: Dhawāwida) is an Arab tribe that lives mainly in the high plains in eastern Algeria. They primarily live around Biskra and Constantine.

== Origins ==
Dhaouaouda are an Arab tribe, they are descended from Banu Riyah, a branch of the Arab Bedouin tribe of Banu Hilal which migrated to the Maghreb in the 11th century.

== History ==
After the tribes of the Banu Hilal penetrated into the Maghreb, Dhouaouda established its own emirate in 1179 under emir Abu Serhan bin Sultan. It set its capital at Biskra and controlled a large area from the Ziban to Sétif to Constantine region, and controlled the trade route to Touggourt in the south. Being the most powerful tribe of Ifriqiya, they controlled half of the cities located in the trays. They defeated a Hafsid incursion in the 13th century. In 1541, the Dhouaouda signed the Pact of Barbarossa with the Ottomans and the emir of Biskra, Ali bin Sakhri pledged allegiance to the Ottoman Empire and took the title 'Shaykh al-Arab'. In the 16th century, contingents of Arab tribesmen were sent from Biskra to Algiers to support the Ottomans in their war with Spain.

== Arab revolt in Algeria ==
In 1637, Murad Bey invited Shaykh al-'Arab Si Mohamed Sakhri Ben Bou Okkaz and his notable principals to visit him in Constantine, Muray Bey would eventually kill Cheikh Al Arab Si Mohammed, his son and all of his principals after accusing them of treason and asking the Dey of Algiers and his Diwan about how he should deal with them, it is believed that Shaykh al-'Arab was killed to reduce the influence of Dhoaouda in eastern Algeria, since they controlled most of eastern Algeria by that time and most of its production (alongside their allies and Makhzen tribes such as Ahl Ben Ali, Ghamra, Ouled Nail, Hrakta and others). One year later, in 1638 Si Ahmed Ben Al Sakhri Bou Akaaz revolted alongside the Beni Abbas Kingdom in the north (Kabyles) who allied after realizing that they share the same interest, retaining their influence in the region and expelling Murad Bey, leading troops from the Ahl ben Ali, Ghamra, Shorfa, Hrakta, Ouled Nail, and all the allied/Makhzen tribes following the Dhouaouda Emirate. Si Sakhri started a major revolt, starting from the Zab Region (Biskra/Sidi Khaled) and reaching the borders of Algiers in the north and Tunisia in the east.

=== Battle of Guidjel ===
Battle of Guidjel
- Part of the Arab revolt in Algeria
| Date | 20 September 1683 |
| Location | Guidjel, near Sétif |
| Result | Decisive rebel victory |

Belligerents
| Regency of Algiers | Dhaouaouda Emirate; Kingdom of Beni Abbas |

Commanders and leaders
| Murad Bey; Hadj Chabane | Ahmed Ben Sakheri Al-Aloui; Betka el-Moqrani |

Strength
| 6,000 Turks | Unknown |

This battle was the most important event in the war. It led to the victory of the rebel coalition and the beylik of Constantine lost control over the area for the next nine years. The revolting troops were mainly composed of A allied/makhzen tribes, including Dhaouaouda and Beni Abbas, who weren't trained and didn't own modern equipment.

Compared to the Ottoman troops, who got support from Algiers and had the most developed rifles and cannons in the region, this made the Turks think that they could destroy the revolting army easily, not knowing that thousands of cavalry men were on their way to take revenge for their old leader. Arabs and Kabyles being led by Si Sakhri (Shaykh al-'Arab) and Betka el-Moqrani, Turks being led by Murad Bey and Qaid Youssef/Hadj Chabane who were sent by the :dey of Algiers with 4,000 soldiers, 200 kheimas (tents), every tent containing 20 soldiers (for a total of 6,000 troops for the Ottoman side). By the end of the day of 20 September 1638, the Turkish army was crushed and destroyed, leading into a decisive victory for the Arabs and anarchy in the beylik of Constantine for the next nine years. Murad Bey went missing after that, although some sources say that he fled to Annaba and later traveled to Algiers.

Eventually both sides signed a peace and the Turks changed their policy towards the Arabs to divide and conquer, weakening the Emirs and tribal leaders by helping to found smaller tribes and securing the loyalties of tribes to the dey of Algiers instead of their sheikh.
