= Al-Raqiq al-Qayrawani =

- أبو إسحاق ابراهيم ابن القاسم الرقيق القيرواني
- Born: c. 972; Kairouan, Ifriqiya
- Died: after 1028
- Occupation(s): Courtier, historian, poet, author
- Era: Zirids
- Known for: Historian of North Africa; prose and poetry on wine, women, and song
- Notable work: Quṭb as-Surūr, Tārīkh Ifriqiyya wal-Maghrib

Abū Isḥāq Ibrāhīm ibn al-Qāsim al-Raqīq al-Qayrawānī (Arabic: أبو إسحاق ابراهيم ابن القاسم الرقيق القيرواني, c. 972 – after 1028) was a courtier and author in the court of the Zirids in Ifriqiya. He is usually known as Ibn al-Raqīq, al-Raqīq al-Qayrawānī or even just al-Raqīq.

Al-Raqiq was born in Qayrawan around 972. He served as secretary to two Zirid princes for over a quarter of a century and gained a reputation as a diplomat, poet and historian. He enjoyed wine, women and song, and in fact wrote treatises on each of those subjects. His work on the enjoyment of wine (Quṭb as-Surūr) is the only one of his prose works to survive in its entirety, but Yaqut has preserved some of his poems. The following is a few lines from one:

And at the convent of al-Quṣayr, what nights have I passed not knowing
Morning from evening, without ever waking from drunkenness!
An innocent virgin presents me with nectar
As soon as the bell chimes at dawn.
Slender Christian beauty, at her slightest movement
Her waist slays me, so slim in size!

He wrote a history of North Africa (Tārīkh Ifriqiyya wal-Maghrib) which enjoyed a very high reputation, and was quoted from by later authors such as Ibn Idhari, Ibn Khaldun and Al-Nuwayri. This is fortunate, as the complete work is now lost. In 1965, a Tunisian scholar working in Morocco discovered a manuscript which he believed might be a small part of al-Raqiq's Tarikh, dealing with the Umayyad conquest of North Africa. This was rushed into print by someone else who got hold of a photocopy and published it as definitely the work of al-Raqiq.

This has been the cause of controversy. Tunisian historian Mohamed Talbi stated that he believed it to be the work of a later anonymous compilator who used al-Raqiq as well as later historians as a source. The work itself (unlike many contemporary histories) contains no indication of who wrote it, and is very fragmentary. According to Talbi (1971), the style does not display the refinement expected of someone like al-Raqiq. There are also anachronisms. Nevertheless, many modern historians quote the work as being of al-Raqiq when forced to use it from lack of other sources.

A further controversy erupted between Tunisian historians Talbi and H.R. Idris when the latter criticised Talbi's article on al-Raqīq in the Encyclopaedia of Islam. Apart from the authorship of the published fragment of the Tārīkh, Idris also took issue with the description of al-Raqīq as having 'Shi'ite sympathies'. The argument raged over several papers in the journal Arabica in the early 1970s.
