= Sless =

The Sless or Slass (Arabic: سلاس) is a Sanhaja Berber tribe settled on the banks of the Ouergha River in the Taounate Province. This tribe exists between two other Sanhaja tribes: the Feshtala tribe and the Mezraoua tribe.

The tribe was originally in the High Atlas before moving to the banks of the Ouergha River in the Almoravid era. They were part of the Hanjafa tribe with the Feshtala tribe, the Mezraoua tribe and other tribes.

The Sless today is divided to multiple groups: Oulad Hammou, Jamal, El Khandaq, Souk Jemaa, Ouled Salih, Oumlil and Ourtzagh.
