= Hamyan =

Hamyan حميان
- Banu Hilal Arab tribe
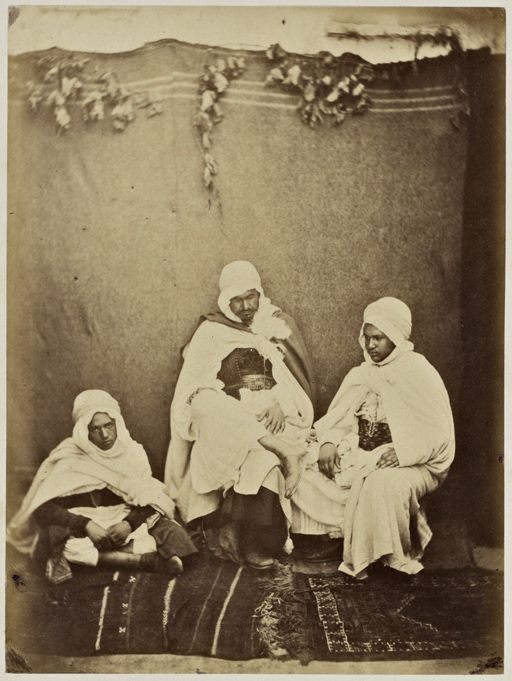
- Moulay Saddiq, Qaid of Qaids of Hamiyan
- Ethnicity: Arab
- Nisba: al-Hamiyani
- Location: Algeria and Morocco
- Parent tribe: Bani Yazid ibn Zoghba
- Language: Arabic
- Religion: Sunni Islam

Hamyan (Arabic: حميان, romanized: Ḥamyān) is a large Bedouin Arab tribe in western Algeria to the southwest of Oran and north of the Atlas Mountains. They are divided into two main groups, Hamyan Sheraga (easterners) in the east and Hamyan Gheraba (westerners) in the west, and these are further divided into several factions. In the 19th century, they had a force of 2,000 cavalry, and herds of 200 camels and 8,000 sheep, not including oxen, horses and donkeys. They follow a nomadic lifestyle, and they emigrated every year to the Tell to trade. They constantly fought with the neighboring Arab tribe of Chaamba in Metlili. The region of Ain Sefra was under the political suzerainty of Hamyan Gheraba. They never submitted to French colonization. They come from the Banu Hilal.

== Origins ==
The Hamiyan are an Arab tribal confederation originating from the Zoghba branch of the Banu Hilal, an Arab tribe that migrated to the Maghreb in the 11th century under the impetus of the Fatimid Caliphate.

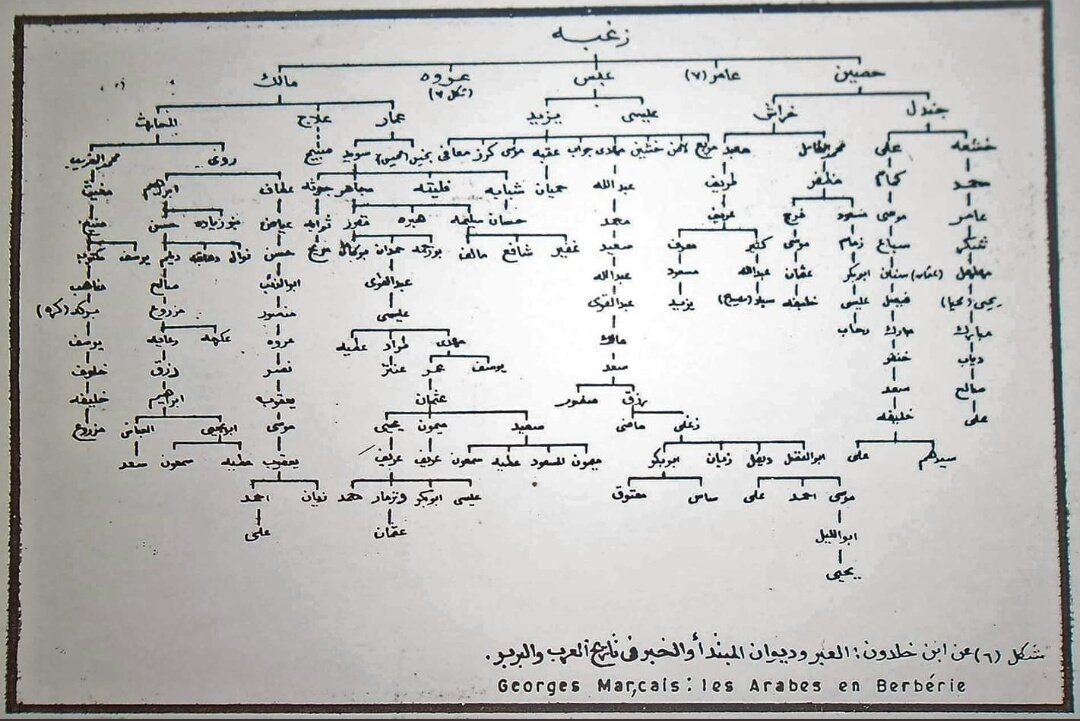
Traditional genealogy (in Arabic) of the descendants of the Zoghba

The lineage of the Hamiyan traces back to a patriarch who gave his name to the tribe, and whose ancestry directly descends from the Banu Hilal. The lineage is as follows: Hamiyan bin (= son of) Oqba bin Yazid bin Aissa (or Abs) bin Zoghba (patriarch of the Zoghba tribes) bin Abi Rabi’ah bin Nahik bin Hilal (patriarch of the Banu Hilal, literally "the Sons of Hilal") bin Amer (patriarch of the Beni Amer ben Saasaa) bin Sa’sa’ah bin Mu’awiyah bin Bakr bin Hawazin bin Mansur bin Ikrimah bin Khasafah bin Qays Aylan bin Mudhar bin Nizar bin Maad bin Adnan (patriarch of the Adnanite Arabs), a descendant of Ishmael, son of Abraham.
