= Zughba =

Sub-tribe of Banu Hilal

Zughba زغبة
- Ethnicity: Arab
- Location: Western Algeria and Morocco
- Parent tribe: Banu Hilal
- Branches: Beni Amer; Beni Malik ben Zoghba; Aroua ben Zoghba; Hassine ben Zoghba; Abs or Aissa ben Zoghba
- Language: Arabic
- Religion: Islam

Zughba (Arabic: زغبة) was an Arab tribe and a sub-tribe of Banu Hilal, a confederation of Arabian tribes that migrated to the Maghreb in the 11th century. They primarily live in western Algeria and Morocco. An example of a sub-tribe of this is Beni Amer.

== Origin ==
Zughba are a sub-tribe of the larger Arabian tribal confederation of Banu Hilal. At the time of the migration, Banu Hilal were very numerous, effectively a nation divided into its own sub-tribes, of which the most notable were the Athbaj, Riyah, Jusham, Zughba, Adi, and Qurra. Sources estimate that the total number of Arab nomads who migrated to the Maghreb in the 11th century was at around 1 million Arabs.

== History ==
In the 12th century, Zughba were the westernmost Hilali tribe, inhabiting an areas stretching from Tlemcen in the west to Algiers in the east. It lived near the tribe of Athbaj which inhabited areas to the south and the east of Zughba, and the Riyah of eastern Algeria around Constantine and Masila, as well as northern Tunisia. Over time, Zughba was settled in Morocco along with the tribes of Khult and Riyah, beginning the rural Arabization of the western Maghreb. Earlier in the 11th century, Zughba used to occupy part of Tripolitania, including the whole region stretching from Tripoli to Gabès, before being replaced there by Banu Sulaym. Zughba had presence in Tripoli even before the Fatimids sent the parent tribe of Banu Hilal to the Maghreb in 1050. A faction of Zughba settled in Tripoli with Banu Qurra in 1037–1038.
