= Almohad expedition to Dukkala =

Almohad Expedition to Dukkala
Date	1149–1150
Location	Doukkala-Abda, present-day Morocco
Result	Almohad victory

Belligerents
Almohad Caliphate	Dukkala tribesmen

Commanders and leaders
Abd al-Mu'min	Unknown

Strength
Unknown	220,000 men

Casualties and losses
Unknown	Heavy losses

The Almohad expedition to Dukkala was led by Abd al-Mu'min against tribesmen of Dukkala.

The Almohad under Abd al-Mu'min conquered Marrakesh in 1147 CE. Subsequently, an Almoravid warlord, Ibn Hûd al-Mâssî, established himself amongst the tribesmen of Dukkala. Soon his authority was recognized throughout the Atlantic plain of Morocco, the Middle Atlas range and even into the High Atlas.

Initially Abd al-Mu'min had ignored the tribesmen raiding the districts of Marrakesh. However, when the raiding increased under al-Mâssî, al-Mu'min led an army against the rebel tribesmen.
