= Athbaj =

Sub-branch of Banu Hilal

Athbaj الاثبج
- Ethnicity: Arab
- Parent tribe: Banu Hilal
- Language: Arabic
- Religion: Islam

The Athbaj (

Arabic: الاثبج) is a sub-tribe of the Banu Hilal, a large confederation of Arab tribes that migrated from the Arabian Peninsula to North Africa in the 11th century.

== History ==
The Athbaj were one of the three main divisions of the Banu Hilal along with the Riyah and Zughba. According to Ibn Khaldun, the Athbaj, which was one of the most important tribes of the Banu Hilal at the time of the Hilalian invasion, was composed of the Garfa and the Drid. In the 12th century, the Athbaj inhabited areas to the south and east of the Zughba who inhabited an area stretching from Tlemcen in the west and Algiers to the east.

Leo Africanus writes concerning the Athbaj:

The Athbej who were al-Mansur's main recruits living in Doukkala and in the plains of Tadla have in recent times been much troubled by the kings of Portugal and sometimes by the King of Fez. They number 100,000 fighting men and more than half are mounted.

With the defeat of the Banu Hilal by the Almohads, the Banu Hilal tribes were resettled around the Maghreb al-Aqsa on a large scale during the region of Almohad ruler Abd al-Mu'min after his conquest of the Central Maghreb and Ifriqya. This policy continued under other Almohad rulers like Yaqub al-Mansur. Ibn Khaldun recorded the distribution of resettled Arab tribes in his Kitab al-Ibar and says that some clans of the Athbaj were settled in the plains of Tamasna.

== Subdivisions ==
The Athbaj are divided into the following tribes:

- Drid (also written as Durayd)
- Garfa
- Amour
- Dahhak and Iyad
- Latif
