= Saʿada and Murabtin =

The Saʿada (singular Saʿdawi) and Murabtin (singular Murabit) form a twofold social division within the Bedouins of western Egypt and eastern Libya.

In modern times, the term Murabit contrasts with Saʿdawi and marks a division of social status among the Bedouin component of the population of this region, where the Murabtin are of lower status. The existence of such a division is a sensitive issue, and its continued observation in Matruh is discouraged by the Egyptian government. Likewise, categorization of the Murabtin as Arab Bedouins.

The etymology of murābiṭ is unclear. It is interpreted as "the tied" (cf. marabout), but it is also derived from ribaṭ, the term for a border fortress.
