= Riyah =

Arab tribe

Riyah (Arabic: رياح, romanized: Riyāḥ) is an Arab tribe and one of the most powerful sub-tribes of Banu Hilal, a confederation of Arabian tribes that emigrated from Najd to the Maghreb in the 11th century. At the time of the Arab migration to the Maghreb in the 11th century, their chief was Munis bin Yahya of the family of Mirdas.

== History ==
The 11th century witnessed the most significant wave of Arab migration, surpassing all previous movements. This event unfolded when the Zirid dynasty of Ifriqiya proclaimed its independence from the Fatimid Caliphate of Egypt. In retribution against the Zirids, the Fatimids dispatched large Bedouin Arab tribes, mainly the Banu Hilal and Banu Sulaym, to defeat the Zirids and settle in the Maghreb. These tribes followed a nomadic lifestyle and were originally from the Hejaz and Najd. They heavily transformed the culture of the Maghreb into Arab culture, and spread nomadism in areas where agriculture was previously dominant. It played a major role in spreading Bedouin Arabic to rural areas such as the countryside and steppes, and as far as the southern areas near the Sahara. Sources estimate that the total number of Arab nomads who migrated to the Maghreb in the 11th century was at around 1 million Arabs. At the time of the migration, Banu Hilal were very numerous, effectively a nation divided into its own sub-tribes, of which the most notable were the Athbaj, Riyah, Jusham, Zughba, Adi, and Qurra.

In Ibn Khaldun's time (1332–1406), Riyah tribes were mainly centered in the area of eastern Algeria around Constantine. In 1217, Arab warriors of Riyah reinforced the Almohad army and defeated an army of the Marinids. The leader of Banu Marin Abd al-Haqq I was killed in the battle and the Marinids were repelled from the region of eastern Morocco for a long time. Ibn Abi Zar recorded this battle and identified the Riyah Arabs as the strongest tribe in the Maghreb. At this time, Riyah were mainly present in the central Maghreb (present-day Algeria) and northern Ifriqiya (northern present-day Tunisia). Over time they were settled in present-day Morocco along with the tribes of Khult and Zughba, beginning the rural Arabization of the western Maghreb.
