= Banu Hilal =

Arab tribal confederation in North Africa

Banu Hilal بنو هلال
- Qaysi Arab tribe
- Ethnicity: Arab
- Nisba: al-Hilālī
- Location: Najd (origin), Maghreb,Shabwa,
- Descended from: Hilal bin 'Amir bin Sa'sa bin Mu'awiya bin Bakr bin Hawazin
- Parent tribe: Banu 'Amir
- Population: 50,000 to 250,000 (estimate of migration to the Maghreb from the 11th century onwards)
- Branches: Athbaj; Riyah; Jusham; Zughba; Adi; Qurra
- Language: Arabic
- Religion: Shia Islam (originally); Sunni Islam (later)

Arab tribes in the Arabian Peninsula in 600 AD. The Lakhmid (yellow) dynasty was a client of the Sasanian Empire, and the Ghassanids (red) of the Roman Empire

The Banu Hilal (Arabic: بنو هلال, romanized: Banū Hilāl) (Note: The name is derived from the Arabic Banū and Hilāl, which translates to children of Hilāl.) is an Arab tribe from the Najd region of the central Arabian Peninsula. A portion of emigrated to the Maghreb region of North Africa in the 11th century. They ruled the Najd and campaigned in the borderlands between Iraq and Syria.

When the Fatimid Caliphate became the rulers of Egypt and the founders of Cairo in 969, they confined the Bedouin in the south before sending them to Central North Africa (Libya, Tunisia and Algeria) and then to Morocco.

Historians estimate the total number of Arab nomads who migrated to the Maghreb in the 11th century to be 50,000 to 250,000, although some scholars have proposed substantially higher estimates (Note: Idris El Hareir estimates the total number of migrants at around one million individuals including Banu Hilal and Banu Sulaym.).

== Origin ==
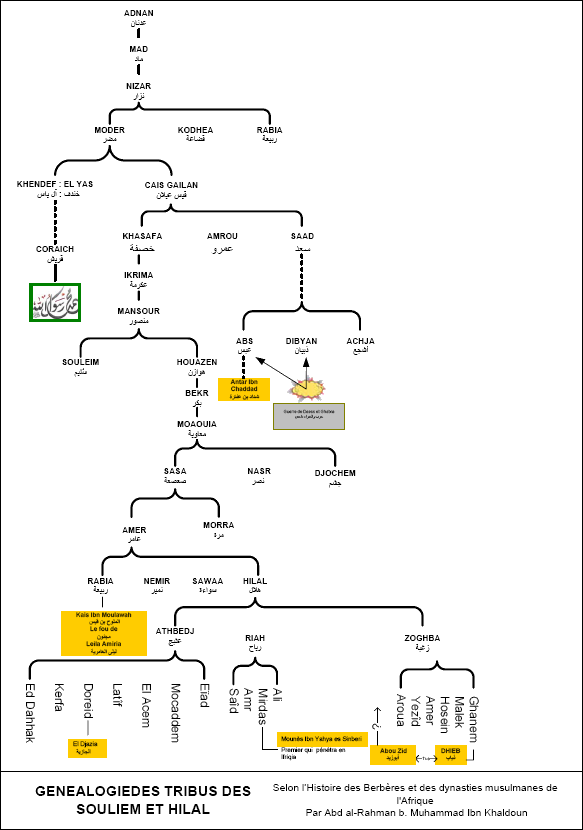
Patrilineal genealogy table

The Banu Hilal originated in Najd in the central Arabian Peninsula, sometimes travelling towards Iraq in search of pastures and oases. According to Arab genealogists, the Banu Hilal were a sub-tribe of the Mudar tribal confederation, specifically of the Amir ibn Sa'sa'a, and their progenitor was Hilal. According to traditional Arab sources, their full genealogy was the following: Hilāl ibn ʿĀmir ibn Ṣaʿṣaʿa ibn Muʿāwiya ibn Bakr ibn Hawāzin ibn Manṣūr ibn ʿIkrima ibn K̲h̲aṣafa ibn Qays ibn ʿAylān ibn Muḍar ibn Nizār ibn Ma'ad ibn ʿAdnān. The Banu Hilal were very numerous, effectively a nation divided into its own sub-tribes, of which the most notable were the Athbaj, Riyah, Jusham, Zughba, Adi, and Qurra.

Ibn Khaldun described their genealogy, which consisted of two mother tribes: themselves and the Banu Sulaym. In Arabia, they lived on the Ghazwan near Ta'if while the Banu Sulaym attended nearby Medina, sharing a common cousin in the Al Yas branch of the Quraysh. At the time of their migration, Banu Hilal comprised six sub-tribes: Athbadj, Riyah, Jusham, Adi, Zughba, and Rabi'a.

== History ==
=== Pre-Islamic Arabia ===
Its original abode, like that of its related tribes, was the Najd. Its history during pre-Islamic times is bound with other tribes of the Banū ʿĀmir ibn Ṣaʿṣaʿa, especially in the ayyām al-ʿarab (battle days of the Arabs) and in affairs related to the rise of Islam in the region, such as that of Massacre of Bi'r Ma'una. The Banu Hilal likely did not accept Islam until after Muhammad's victory at the Battle of Hunayn in 630, but like other ʿĀmirid tribes, they also did not join in the Ridda Wars that followed Muhammad's death in 632.

=== Migration to Egypt, Iraq and the Levant ===
The tribe does not appear to have played any significant role in the early Muslim conquests, and for the most part remained in the Nejd. Only in the early 8th century did some of the Banu Hilal (and the Banu Sulaym) move to Egypt. Many followed, so that the two groups became numerous in Egypt. During the Abbasid Caliphate, the Hilal were known for their unruliness. In the 9th century, Banu Hilal and Banu Sulaym migrated from Najd to Iraq, and later to the Levant, before migrating to the Maghreb in the 11th century.

In the 970s, the Hilal and the Sulaym joined the radical sect of the Qarmatians in their attacks on the Fatimid Caliphate, which had just conquered Egypt and was pushing into Syria. As a result, after his victory over the Qarmatians in 978, the Fatimid caliph al-Aziz (r. 975–996) forcibly relocated the two tribes to Upper Egypt. As they continued to fight among themselves and pillage the area, they were prohibited from crossing the Nile River or leaving Upper Egypt.

The Banu Hilal, together with the Banu Sulaym, plundered Upper Egypt and the region as far as the port of Aydhab. They also raided desert routes, attacking travelers to and from the oases despite orders not to cross the Nile, with the complicity of their Akārima kinsmen. According to al-Tijani, the Banu Hilal and the Banu Sulaym refused to cross the Nile until each warrior received a dinar and a fur garment, after which around 3,000 Bedouins departed for Ifriqiya. Not all of the Banu Hilal migrated to Ifriqiya. Many remained in Egypt, particularly in the eastern Huf region and Upper Egypt, where several of their clans continued to reside.

=== Migration to the Maghreb ===
The Banu Hilal first began migrating to the Maghreb when the Zirid dynasty of Ifriqiya proclaimed its independence from the Fatimid Caliphate of Egypt. In retribution against the Zirids, the Fatimids dispatched large Bedouin Arab tribes, mainly the Banu Hilal and Banu Sulaym, to defeat the Zirids and settle in the Maghreb. These tribes followed a nomadic lifestyle and were originally from the Hejaz and Najd. To persuade the Bedouin into migrating to the Maghreb, the Fatimid caliph gave each tribesman a camel and money and helped them cross from the east to the west bank of the Nile River. The severe drought in Egypt at the time also persuaded these tribes to migrate to the Maghreb, which had a better economic situation at the time. The Fatimid caliph instructed them to rule the Maghreb instead of the Zirid emir al-Mu'izz and told them "I have given you the Maghrib and the rule of al-Mu'izz ibn Balkīn as-Sanhājī the runaway slave. You will want for nothing." and told al-Mu'izz "I have sent you horses and put brave men on them so that God might accomplish a matter already enacted".

Upon arriving in Cyrenaica, the Arab nomads found the region almost empty of its inhabitants, except a few Zenata Berbers that al-Mu'izz had already mostly destroyed around Barqa. Estimates of the number of displaced persons vary among historians: on the one hand, a few tens of thousands of combatants according to Gabriel Camps, on the other hand, up to 50,000 people who left Egypt. Other estimates report a total of 150,000 to 200,000 people (including 50,000 warriors). This figure of 50,000 warriors is also cited by Leo Africanus, who relies on a certain medieval chronicler, "Ibnu Rachu". Cyrenaica was left to the Banu Sulaym while the Hilalians continued their westward expansion. According to the Encyclopédie berbère, the Banu Hilal, Banu Sulaym, and Banu Maqil together numbered no more than 100,000 Arabs in the Maghreb. Historians estimate the total number of Arab nomads who migrated to the Maghreb in few decades 11th century to be 250,000. Idris El Hareir provides estimates that yield the total number of individuals to 1,000,000 including the Banu Hilal and Banu Sulaym. According to Maya Shatzmiller, the entire population of the Maghreb at the time was estimated to be 5,000,000.

According to Ibn Khaldun, the Banu Hilal were accompanied by their wives and their children when they came to the Maghreb. They settled in Ifriqiya after winning battles against Berber tribes, eventually going on to coexist with them. Abu Zayd al-Hilali led between 150,000 and 300,000 Arabs into the Maghreb, who intermarried with the indigenous peoples. The Fatimids used the tribe, which began their journey as allies and vassals, to punish the particularly difficult to control Zirids after the conquest of Egypt and the founding of Cairo. As the dynasty became increasingly independent and abandoned Shia Islam, they quickly defeated the Zirids after the battle of Haydaran and deeply weakened the neighboring Hammadid dynasty and the Zenata. The Zirids abandoned Kairouan to take refuge on the coast where they survived for a century. The Banu Hilal and Banu Sulaym spread on the high plains of Constantine where they gradually obstructed the Qal'at Bani Hammad as they had done to Kairouan a few decades ago. From there, they gradually gained control over the high plains of Algiers and Oran. In the second half of the 12th century, they went to the Moulouya valley and the Atlantic coast in the western Maghreb to areas such as Doukkala.

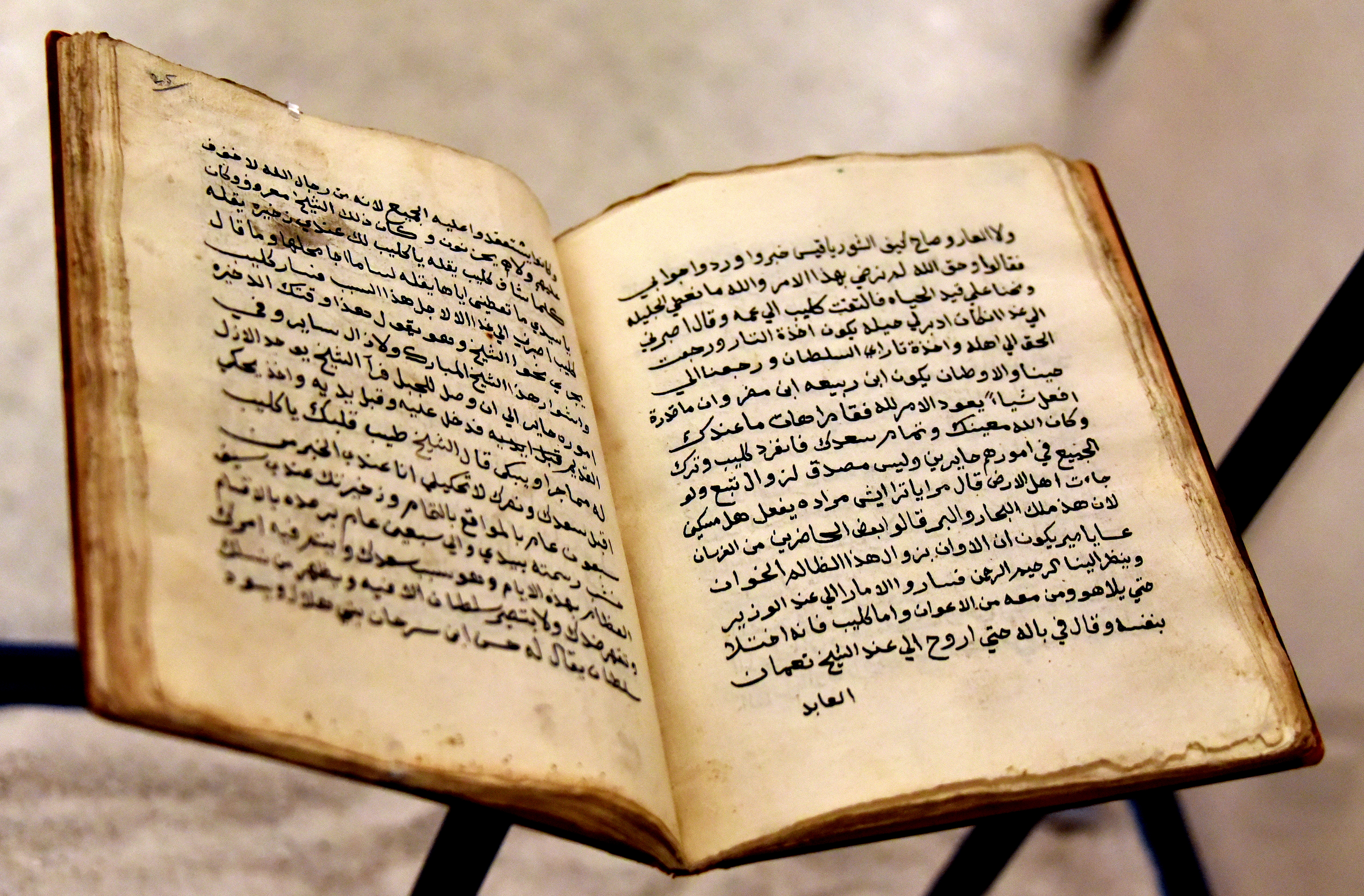
A rare Arabic manuscript of the orally-transmitted epic poem about the Banu Hilal, by Hussein Al-Ulaimi, 1849 CE, origin unknown

Their influx was a major factor in the linguistic, cultural and ethnic Arabization of the Maghreb and in the spread of nomadism in areas where agriculture had previously been dominant. It played a major role in spreading Bedouin Arabic to rural areas such as the countryside and steppes, and as far as the southern areas near the Sahara. Ibn Khaldun noted that the lands ravaged by Banu Hilal invaders had become completely arid desert.

The Banu Hilal later came under the rule of various subsequent dynasties, including the Almohad Caliphate, Hafsid dynasty, Zayyanid dynasty and Marinid dynasty. Finding their continued presence intolerable, the Almohad Caliphate defeated the Banu Hilal in the Battle of Setif and forced many of them to leave Ifriqiya and settle in Morocco. Upon the arrival of the Turks, the Banu Hilal rose against the Ottoman Empire near the Aurès region and south Algeria. In Morocco during the 17th century, the sultan Ismail Ibn Sharif created a guich army made up of Arab warriors from the Banu Hilal and the Banu Maqil which was one of the main parts of the Moroccan army. They were garrisoned in their own lands of water and pastures and served as troops and military garrisons to fight in wars and suppress rebellions.

== Social organization ==
Originally, the Banu Hilal embraced a nomadic lifestyle, rearing cattle and sheep. Despite several tribes living in arid and desert areas, they became experts in the field of agriculture. The Banu Hilal were conservative and patriarchal, and were tolerant Shi'ites. They were initially Isma'ili Shia, but after their conquest of the Sunni Maghreb, the vast majority of Banu Hilal progressively adopted the Maliki school of Sunni Islam, following the Malikization of the Maghreb in the twelfth century and later centuries.

== Taghribat Banu Hilal ==
The accounts and records that the folk poet Abdul Rahman al-Abnudi gathered from the bards of Upper Egypt culminated in the Taghribat Bani Hilal, an Arab epic describing the journey of the tribe from Arabia to the Maghreb. The tale is divided into three main cycles. The first two bring together unfolding events in Arabia and other countries of the east, while the third, called Taghriba (march west), recounts the migration of the Banu Hilal to North Africa. Until the early 20th century, the story of Banu Hilal was performed in a variety of forms across the Arab world from Morocco to Iraq, as folktale or local legend recounted in poetry.

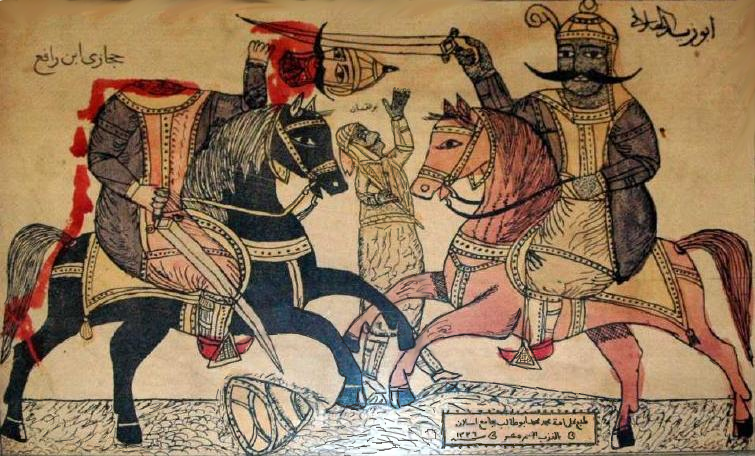
Egyptian engraving
Abu Zeyd beheads Hijazi bin Rafa

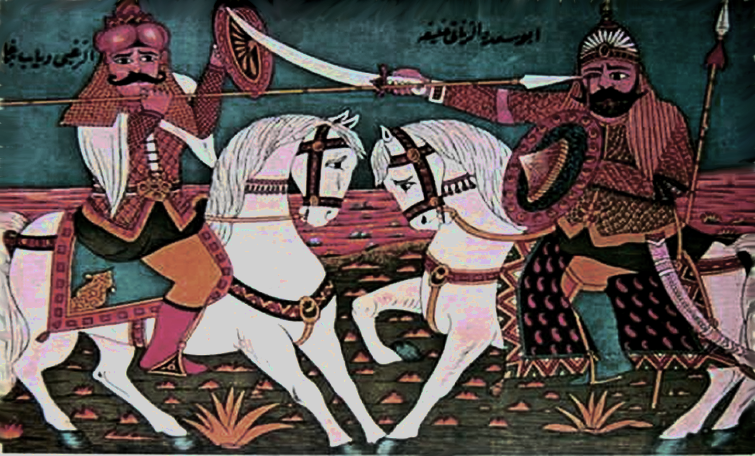
Egyptian engraving
Dhiab bin Ghanim against Al-Zanati Khalifa

== Sources ==
- Baadj, Amar S. (2015). Saladin, the Almohads and the Banū Ghāniya: The Contest for North Africa (12th and 13th centuries). Leiden and Boston: Brill. ISBN 978-90-04-29620-6.
- Idris, H. R. (1971). "Hilāl". In Lewis, B.; Ménage, V. L.; Pellat, Ch. & Schacht, J. (eds.). The Encyclopaedia of Islam, Second Edition. Volume III: H–Iram. Leiden: E. J. Brill. pp. 385–387. OCLC 495469525.
- Schleifer, J. (1971). "Hilāl – The Saga of the Banū Hilāl". In Lewis, B.; Ménage, V. L.; Pellat, Ch. & Schacht, J. (eds.). The Encyclopaedia of Islam, Second Edition. Volume III: H–Iram. Leiden: E. J. Brill. p. 387. OCLC 495469525.
- Schuster, Georg (2006). Die Beduinen in der Vorgeschichte Tunesiens. Die "Invasion" der Banū Hilāl und ihre Folgen (in German). Berlin: Klaus Schwarz. ISBN 3-87997-330-X.
