= Battle of Kolwezi =

1978 battle in Zaire during Shaba II

- Part of Shaba II and Shaba Invasions and Katanga insurgency and the Cold War
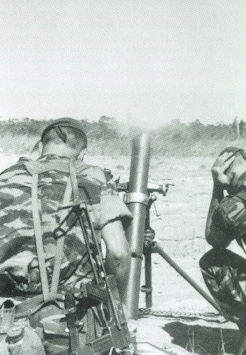
- Mortar of the 2 REP in action.
Date	18–22 May 1978
Location	Kolwezi, Zaire
Result	Coalition (Zaire/French) victory

Belligerents
France; Belgium; Morocco; Zaire; United States	FLNC

Commanders and leaders
(France) Philippe Erulin (France) (Croatia) Ante Gotovina	Nathaniel Mbumba

Strength
~5,000	3,000–4,000 (estimated)

Casualties and losses
(Zaire) ~120 killed (France) 5 killed, 6 missing (Belgium) 1 killed	~250–400 killed; 160 captured

The Battle of Kolwezi (French: Bataille de Kolwezi) was an airborne operation by French and Belgian airborne forces that took place in May 1978 in Zaire during the Shaba II invasion of Zaire by the Front for the National Liberation of the Congo (FLNC). It aimed at rescuing European and Zairean hostages held by FLNC rebels after they conquered the city of Kolwezi. The operation succeeded with the liberation of the hostages and light military casualties.

== Context ==
=== Situation of Kolwezi ===
The city of Kolwezi is situated in the ore-rich region of Shaba (now Lualaba), in the South-East of Zaire (now the Democratic Republic of the Congo). In 1978, the city held 100,000 inhabitants in a 40 km^{2} urban area, with city quarters, separated by hills. It is a strategic spot, as it lies on important roads and railroad lines that link Lubumbashi to Dilolo. There is an airport 6 kilometres (3.7 mi) from the center of the city.

=== Hostage taking by rebels ===
In March 1978, a meeting took place between Algerian and Angolan officials and militants of the FLNC. Zairian intelligence was made aware of a possible destabilisation operation in the Shaba region, which had a high value because of its mines of precious materials like copper, cobalt, uranium and radium. For some months the Soviet Union had been purchasing all the cobalt available on the free market, but western intelligence did not connect this to the upcoming crisis. The FLNC operation was to be headed by Nathaniel Mbumba.

In May 1978, an uprising took place in Shaba against President Mobutu Sese Seko. On 11 May, a 3,000 to 4,000 man strong FLNC rebel group arrived. The FLNC was supported by foreign mercenaries. Departing from Angola, it had crossed neutral Zambia. Upon arriving, they took about 3,000 Europeans as hostages and carried out various executions, particularly after the intervention of Zairian paratroopers on 15 May. Between 90 and 280 Europeans were killed.

From 15 May, hundreds of rebels started departing the city in stolen vehicles, leaving only 500 men, most of whom were garrisoned in the quarter of Manika and in the suburbs.

Mobutu requested foreign assistance from Belgium, France and the United States; the French advisor René Journiac was swiftly sent to Kinshasa. These powers saw the uprising as proof of a Soviet offensive and decided that an armed intervention was necessary to keep Zaire in the pro-Western camp. An agreement to intervene was struck between France, Morocco, Zaire and the US.

While Western authorities believed that the rebel forces were "manipulated by the Soviets" and assisted by officers from the socialist states of Cuba and the GDR, more recent research has shown that the Katangan rebels "had few connections with the Cuban army or advisors stationed in Angola". Archival documents also suggest that Zairian authorities deliberately exaggerated the threat of Soviet influence to ensure French aid.

== Franco-Belgian operation ==
=== Preparation ===
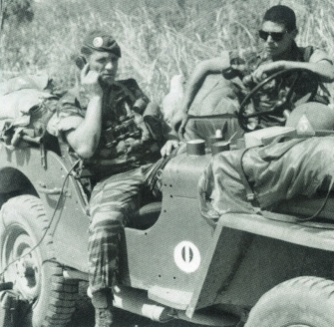
French radio operator in a Jeep.

On 16 May at 00:45, the French 2nd Foreign Parachute Regiment, led by Colonel Philippe Erulin, was put on alert. A meeting took place in West Germany between Belgian and French officials to coordinate a common operation. The meeting was a failure, as the French wanted to deploy their forces to neutralise the rebels and secure the city, while the Belgians wanted to evacuate foreigners. Eventually the Belgian Paracommando Regiment was sent independently. Meanwhile, elements of the planned operation started to leak into the press, causing fears that surprise would be lost if swift action were not taken.

On 17 May, soldiers of the 2e REP embarked in four DC-8s of the French airline UTA and were flown from Solenzara in Corsica to Kinshasa. Heavy equipment followed in a Boeing 707, arriving on the 18th at 23:15. Preparation took place at Kinshasa military airport, notably instruction in using American parachutes that took place on the night of 18/19 May. A briefing also took place, given by Colonel Yves Gras, the French military attaché in Kinshasa. At 11:00, the first wave took off in two French Transalls and four Zairian C-130 Hercules, piloted by the United States military. Meanwhile, the Belgian Paracommandos were regrouping in Kamina.

The first C-130 of the Belgian Air Force took off on 18 May at 13:15 from Melsbroek Air Base, bound for Kamina via Kinshasa. At the time authorisation for the crossing of French airspace had not yet been given, and it was obtained just as the third C-130 was taking off. Thirty-six hours afterwards, the Paracommando Regiment was deployed in Zaire and ready for action.

=== French Bonite (or Léopard) and Belgian Red Bean Operations ===
On 19 May the 2e REP were flown from Kinshasa to Kolwezi, 1,500 kilometres (930 mi) away. At 14:30, a 450-man first wave jumped from a 250 metres (820 ft) altitude into the old hippodrome of the city. The drop was performed under fire from light infantry weapons, and six men were wounded as they landed, while another was isolated from his unit, killed and mutilated in the street before even removing his parachute.

A violent firefight ensued in the streets, while French snipers started picking out threatening rebels, killing 10 of them at 300 metres (330 yd) with the FR F1 sniper rifle. European hostages and those who had been able to hide started to come under the control and protection of the French. At 15:00, rebel armour attempted a counter-attack with three captured Panhard AML armoured cars, which legionnaires met with rocket and small arms fire. The lead AML-60 was knocked out at a range of 50 metres by an LRAC F1; a second AML discharged a single 90mm shell at its assailants before withdrawing.

At 18:00, the city was under French control and mostly secured. During the night, rebels attempted to infiltrate but were stopped by an ambush prepared by the French Foreign Legion.

On the night of 19/20 May, further fighting occurred. On the 20th, at 06:30, another wave of 250 paratroopers (the 4th company and the exploration and reconnaissance section) was dropped east of the city, taking rebel positions from behind and occupying this part of the city before noon. This group entered the P2 quarter and discovered the massacres that had occurred there.

On 20 May, the Paracommando Regiment landed on the airport and headed towards the city on foot. Elements of the French Foreign Legion opened fire and a few exchanges occurred before the units identified each other; the incident did not cause casualties. The Belgians then entered Kolwezi and started evacuating Europeans towards the airport, leaving the securing of the city to the French. The first hostages were evacuated to Europe at noon.

The day after the airport was retaken, Mobutu arrived in person to boost troop morale and reassure the population; he seized the opportunity to parade several European corpses in Villa P2. This struck Western public opinion and led to a widespread acceptance of the decision by the Elysée to launch the operation. Pierre Yambuya later reported that the Europeans of Villa P2 had in fact been executed by troops of Colonel Bosange because Mobutu wished to provoke an international intervention.

Initially ordered to stay for 72 hours at most, the Belgians ended up staying over a month, along with Moroccan troops, supplying the population with food and maintaining order.

On the afternoon of 20 May, Metalkat (now Metal-Shaba) was taken by the 2 REP, forcing 200 rebels away. Sergent-Chef Daniel was killed during the fight. This swift operation provided the paratroops with the surprise element that they exploited, capturing the centre of the city. Within two days, the entire city was under control, and 2,800 Europeans were secured and evacuated on 21 May.

=== Relief ===
The entire region soon came under control of French and Belgian paratroops, until they were relieved by an Inter-African Force (Force Interafricaine) led by 1,500 soldiers from Morocco and comprising Senegal (560–600), Togo, and Gabon. Other contributors to the force included Côte d'Ivoire who dispatched about 200 medics. Between the departure of the French and the arrival of the Inter-African force, Kolwezi was under control of Mobutu's force, who arrested and executed hundreds, labeled as "rebels".

The force was under the command of the Moroccan Colonel-Major Khader Loubaris, and the Senegalese contingent was under the command of Colonel Osmane Ndoye. The Senegalese force comprised a parachute battalion from Thiaroye.

== Outcome ==
During the entire incident, 700 African civilians and between 120 and 170 European expats were killed, largely in massacres by the FLNC. Around 2,000 Europeans, and 3,000 Africans were evacuated during the operation.

Among the FLNC fighters, about 400 were killed and 160 taken prisoner, while 1,500 light and heavy weapons were seized, notably 10 heavy machine guns, 38 light machine guns, four artillery pieces, 15 mortars and 21 rocket launchers. Two Panhard armoured cars of the Zairean security forces were also captured or destroyed. Five French soldiers were killed and 25 were wounded with the 2 REP, whereas six went missing at the French military mission. One Belgian paratrooper was also killed.

The 311th Zairian Paratrooper Battalion saw 14 casualties and eight injuries.

The operation was an illustration of the efficiency and effectiveness of light infantry when used with the element of surprise and with good intelligence and logistics.

Mobutu's regime was strengthened and Franco-Zairian military cooperation was increased. French industrial groups, notably Thomson-CSF, CGE, and Péchiney, signed new contracts in Zaire shortly after the operation.

== See also ==
- List of massacres in the Democratic Republic of the Congo
