= FNLC =

FNLC may refer to:

- the National Front for the Liberation of Corsica
- the Front for the National Liberation of the Congo, in the late 1970s
