= Glen Eschtruth =

Methodist medical missionary (1928–1977)

Glen R. Eschtruth, M.D. (April 19, 1928 – April 19, 1977) was a Methodist medical missionary who operated a mission hospital in Kapanga, Zaire (now Congo-Kinshasa) from 1960 with his wife, Lena Eschtruth.

Eschtruth graduated from Wayne State University in Detroit, USA with a degree in medicine. He went on to become Chief of Surgery in the US Air Force at Cape Kennedy; he then established and pastored the United Methodist Church at Cocoa Beach in Florida, before going to England to study Tropical Medicine.

Eschtruth and his wife Lena travelled to Congo in 1961 with their three young daughters. By 1970, they were running the hospital and had also set up 23 rural clinics.

In early 1977, the Congolese National Liberation Front (FNLC) launched an offensive into Zaire from neighboring Angola, known as the Shaba I incursion. Along with a number of other missionaries and aid workers in the Kapanga region, Glen and Lena were placed under house arrest by the FNLC militants. When Zairian forces, with Western assistance, successfully repelled the invasion, Glen, on or about 15 April 1977, was seized by the FNLC as they evacuated Kapanga. He was accused of hiding and using ham radios. He was shot dead and his body was found in a shallow grave not far from Kapanga. Eschtruth was the only foreign national to be killed in the course of the invasion.

Lena Eschtruth married a missionary mechanic, Herbert Ellinger, in 1997.

Their daughter, Caroline Rush Eschtruth, was briefly married (1976–78) to American researcher Steven Hatfill.
