= Progressive Congolese Students =

The Progressive Congolese Students (French: Étudiants Congolais Progressistes, or ECP) was a Zairean student political movement active in exile. Its main centre of activity was Belgium, particularly Université catholique de Louvain based in Louvain-la-Neuve. Politically, it had a Lumumbist orientation. It had relations with the Progressive Reform Party. The ECP was frequently plagued by infiltrations by agents of the Mobutist regime. ECP published a magazine entitled Congo-Libération.

Following the Shaba I clashes in 1977, the Front for the National Liberation of the Congo (FLNC) sought contact with ECP. ECP members went to Angola between July and November 1977 and were incorporated into the FLNC Central Committee. Nevertheless, relations between ECP members and the FLNC leader Mbumba were strained.

In July 1980, the ECP, together with the FLNC and other exiled opposition groups, founded the Council for the Liberation of the Congo-Kinshasa (Conseil pour la Libération du Congo-Kinshasa, CLC) in Brussels.
