= Pierre Yambuya =

Zairean helicopter pilot, civil servant, and political refugee (1950–2019)

Mzee Pierre Yambuya Lotika Kibesi
- Roundel of Zaire Air Force
- Born: December 12, 1950; Stanleyville, Belgian Congo
- Died: 31 July 2019 (aged 68); Belluno, Italy
- Burial place: Kasangulu
- Military career
- Allegiance: Forces armées zaïroises (FAZ)
- Branch: Force aérienne zaïroise (FAZA)
- Service years: 1970-1984
- Rank: lieutenant
- Conflicts: Shaba I; Shaba II

Pierre Yambuya Lotika Kibesi (Stanleyville, 12 December 1950 — Belluno, 31 July 2019) was a Zairean helicopter pilot, civil servant, and political refugee.

== Biography ==
Yambuya was born in Stanleyville, Belgian Congo as the son of Abram Yambuya, high civil servant within the Mouvement national congolais party of the country's first Prime Minister, Patrice Lumumba. He was the grandson of pastor Yambuya, early Kimbanguist in Stanleyville. He went to school at the Athenée royal in Stanleyville in 1957.

As an adolescent, he fought in the Comité national de libération alongside Laurent-Désiré Kabila during the Simba rebellion in 1964. He subsequently went into exile in Sudan, Uganda, Egypt, and Bulgaria.

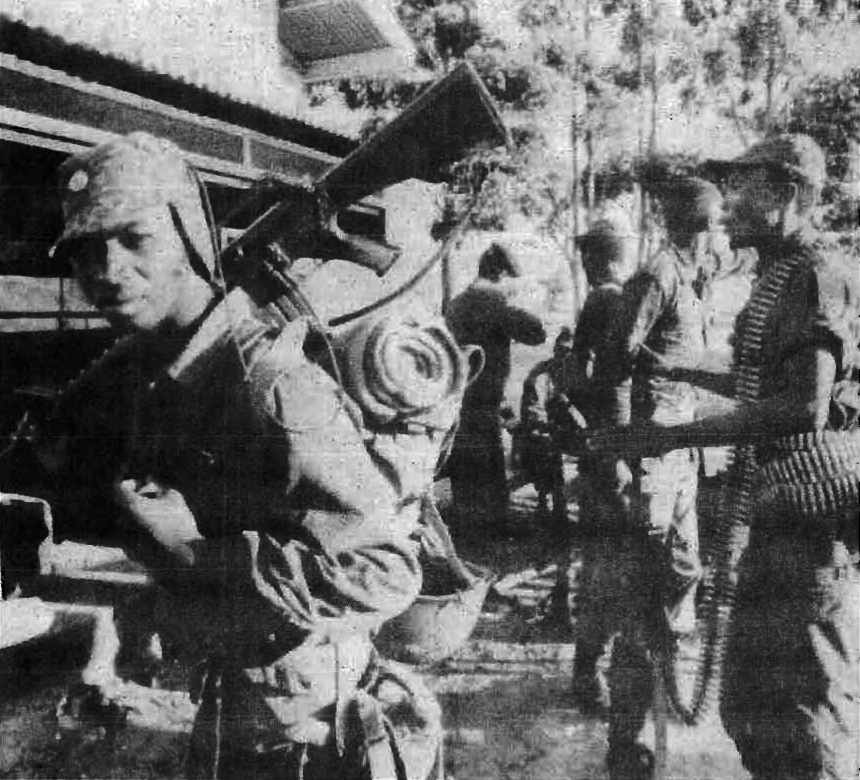
Zairean troops with a Moroccan military adviser during the Shaba I war

Yambuya returned to Congo in 1966 and, after obtaining his high school degree in Bas-Congo in 1970, he joined the Congolese military and obtained his helicopter pilot licence in Marignane, France in May 1975. That same year, he returns to his native country to start at the helicopter squadron of Ndolo base, Kinshasa. According to his tell-all memoir about his time in the Zairean army (Forces armées zaïroises, FAZ), Zaïre: l'abattoir, he regularly had to perform "special missions", moving prisoners to places where they were tortured or assassinated. On other occasions, he had to drop packages of up to 600 kg. filled with corpses and debris in a river.

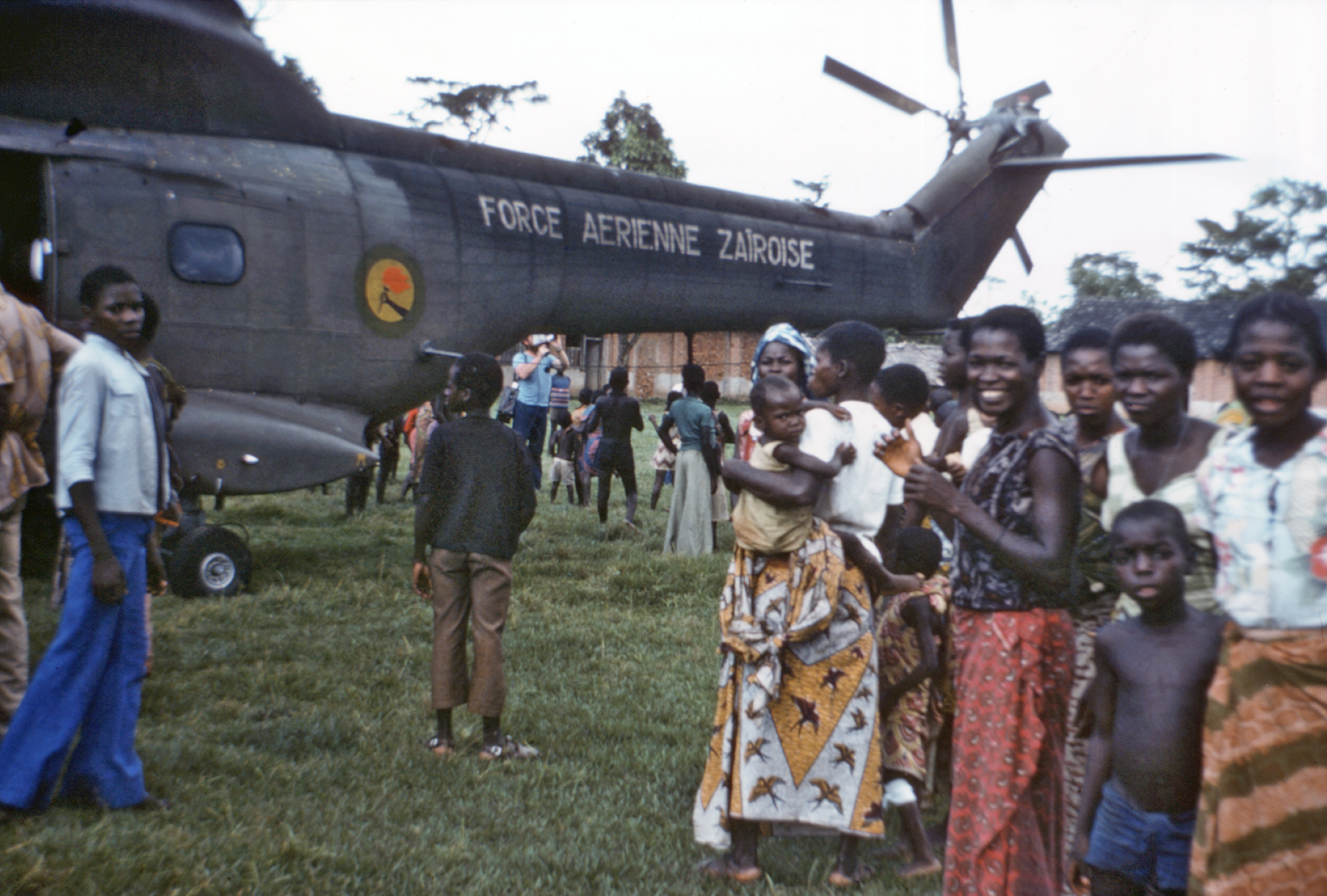
A FAZA Puma helicopter during the 1976 Ebola outbreak

He fought during the first Shaba war in 1977 and second Shaba war in 1978, when ex-Katangese gendarmes invaded the Shaba province (formerly Katanga) from Angola and Zambia and were pushed back by the FAZ and international interventions. During Shaba II's Battle of Kolwezi, thirty European residents were murdered in a villa in the P2 quarter of the city during the so-called "P2 massacre" in May 1978. Blamed by Zaire's President Mobutu Sese Seko on the rebels, Yambuya nevertheless claimed that FAZ Colonel Bosange ordered his troops to shoot through the blinds of the villa, killing the Europeans who sought refuge. One rumour even claimed that they were murdered by FAZ forces to provoke a foreign intervention. The international decision to intervene, however, was already taken by that time.

On 30 October 1984, troops of Yambuya's superior general Bolozi arrested him when he refused to take part in a special mission and was mistreated in prison. An officer helps him to escape and he subsequently fled to Rome. He began to work for Amnesty International in Rome, published his memoir, gave interviews to newspapers, and participated in conferences.

In November 1996, Yambuya joins his old rebel ally Laurent-Désiré Kabila at the AFDL. After Kabila replaced Mobutu as the country's President, Yambuya returned and founded the Directorate General of Migration (DGM) and was its Director from 1997 to 2004. Joseph Kabila succeeded his father Laurent-Désiré who was assassinated, in 2001. Adversary to Joseph Kabila's regime, the security service decided to arrest Yambuya who once again went into exile. He appeared in documentaries such as Thierry Michel's Mobutu, King of Zaire about Mobutu's presidency. He published several volumes about "Neocolonialism in Congo", in which he proposes the theory that Joseph is not the biological child of Laurent-Désiré Kabila.

== Publications ==
- Yambuya, Pierre (1991). Zaïre: het Abattoir. Over gruweldaden van het leger van Mobutu. Antwerp: EPO Uitgeverij. ISBN 9789064455261.
- Yambuya, Pierre (1991). Zaïre: l'abattoir. Un pilote de Mobutu parle. Antwerp: Editions EPO. ISBN 9782872620364.
- Yambuya, Pierre (1996). L'Autopsie d'une armée sans cœur ni âme. Mobutu, je suis témoin oculaire de vos crimes. Kinshasa: Editions Zazeta.
- Yambuya, Pierre (2003). Le développement de la RDC par la Direction générale de migration (PDF). Kinshasa: Direction générale de migration.
- Yambuya Lotika kibesi, Pierre. Le néocolonialisme au Congo. ISBN 2952639760.

== See also ==
- Battle of Kolwezi – 1978 battle in Zaire during Shaba II
- Mobutu, King of Zaire
- Operation Leopard
- Shaba I – Military conflict in Zaire (1977)
- Shaba II – Historical military conflict
