= Safari Club =

Former alliance of intelligence services

- Part of the Cold War
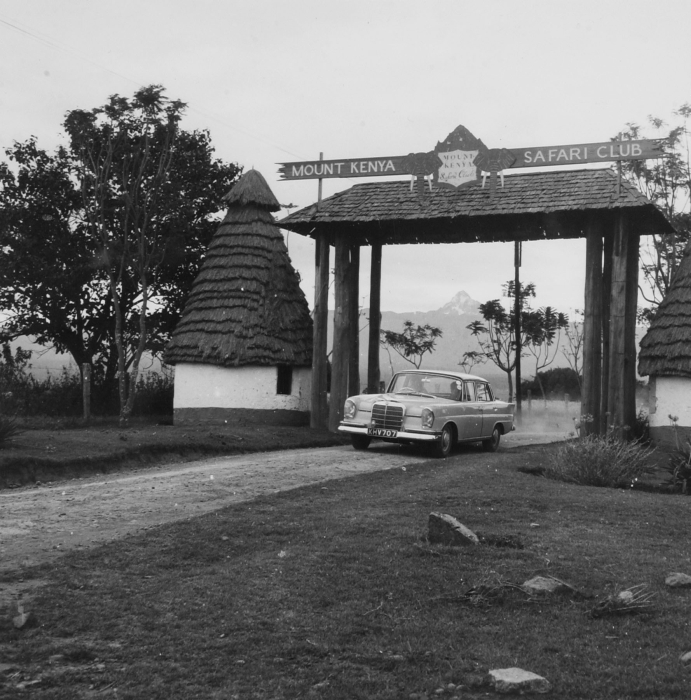
- Adnan Khashoggi's Mount Kenya Safari Club, from which the alliance derives its name.
- Type: Covert operation
- Location: Africa
- Planned by: Members: Egypt; France; Iran; Morocco; Saudi Arabia; Supported: United States
- Target: Soviet influence in Africa
- Date: 1976–1983
- Executed by: Intelligence agencies of participating countries

The Safari Club was a covert alliance of intelligence services formed in 1976 that ran clandestine operations around Africa after the United States Congress limited the power of the CIA in the mid-1970s. The Club formed in the late 1970s after the bloodless left-wing Carnation Revolution on 25th April 1974, after which Portugal's last colonies in Africa gained independence. The revolution effectively ended the Portuguese Colonial War.

The Safari Club formal members were pre-revolutionary Iran, Egypt, Saudi Arabia, Morocco, and France. The group maintained informal connections with the United States, South Africa, Rhodesia, and Israel. The group executed a successful military intervention in Zaire in response to an invasion from Angola. It also provided arms to Somalia, which precipitated an internal divide over American abstention from the Ogaden War. It organized secret diplomacy relating to anti-communism in Africa, and has been credited with initiating the process resulting in the 1979 Egypt–Israel peace treaty.

The Safari Club could not function effectively after the Iranian Revolution neutralized the Shah of Iran.

== Organization ==
Alexandre de Marenches initiated the pact with messages to the four other countries—and to newly independent Algeria, which declined to participate.

The original charter was signed in 1976 by leaders and intelligence directors from the five countries:

- France – Alexandre de Marenches, Director of the SDECE
- Saudi Arabia – Kamal Adham, Director of the GIP
- Egypt – General Kamal Hassan Ali, Director of the Mukhabarat
- Morocco – General Ahmed Dlimi, Director of the DGED
- Iran – General Nematollah Nassiri, Director of the SAVAK

The charter begins: "Recent events in Angola and other parts of Africa have demonstrated the continent's role as a theater for revolutionary wars prompted and conducted by the Soviet Union, which utilizes individuals or organizations sympathetic to, or controlled by, Marxist ideology."

The group's purpose was therefore to oppose Soviet influence by supporting anti-communists. The charter also says that the group intends to be "global in conception". Its formation has been attributed to interlocking interests of the countries involved (which were already cooperating to some degree). Alongside ideological pursuit of global anti-communism, these included the more concrete goals of military strategy and economic interests. Examples include international mining operations and investments in apartheid South Africa's Transvaal Development Company.

=== Infrastructure ===
"The club sat on ninety-one acres of magnificent landscape, with Mount Kenya as a backdrop. There were mountain streams, rose gardens, waterfalls flowing into quiet pools... Peacocks, storks, ibexes, and exotic birds strolled about..."

— Ronald Kessler, The Richest Man in the World: The Story of Adnan Khashoggi, 1986

The Safari Club takes its name (reportedly de Marenches' idea) after the exclusive resort in Kenya where the group first met in 1976. The club was operated by Saudi arms dealer Adnan Khashoggi—also a friend of Adham's.

The original charter establishes that an operations center would be built by 1 September 1976 in Cairo. The group made its headquarters there, and its organization included a secretariat, a planning wing, and an operations wing. Meetings were also held in Saudi Arabia and in Egypt. The group made large purchases of real estate and secure communications equipment.

The creation of the Safari Club coincided with the consolidation of the Bank of Credit and Commerce International (BCCI). The BCCI served to launder money, particularly for Saudi Arabia and the United States—whose CIA director in 1976, George H. W. Bush, had a personal account. "The Safari Club needed a network of banks to finance its intelligence operations. With the official blessing of George Bush as the head of the CIA, Adham transformed a small Pakistani merchant bank, the Bank of Credit and Commerce International (BCCI), into a worldwide money-laundering machine, buying banks around the world in order to create the biggest clandestine money network in history."

BCCI also served as an intelligence gathering mechanism by virtue of its extensive contacts with underground organizations worldwide. "They contrived, with Bush and other intelligence-service heads, a plan that seemed too good to be true. The bank would solicit the business of every major terrorist, rebel, and underground organization in the world. The invaluable intelligence thus gained would be discreetly distributed to 'friends' of the BCCI."

=== United States involvement ===
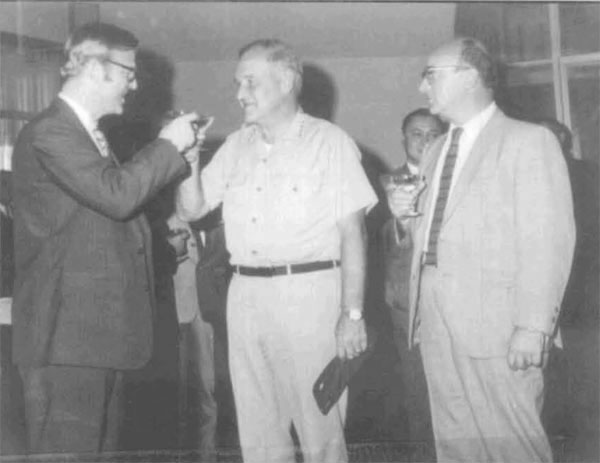
Theodore Shackley (left) was a key CIA contact for the Safari Club

The United States was not a formal member of the group, but was involved to some degree, particularly through the CIA. Henry Kissinger is credited with the American strategy of supporting the Safari Club implicitly—allowing it to fulfill American objectives by proxy without risking direct responsibility ("plausible deniability"). This function became particularly important after the US Congress passed the War Powers Resolution in 1973 and the Clark Amendment in 1976, reacting against covert military actions orchestrated within the government's executive branch.

An important factor in the nature of US involvement concerned changing domestic perceptions of the CIA and government secrecy. The Rockefeller Commission and the Church Committee had recently launched investigations that revealed decades of illegal operations by the CIA and the FBI. The Watergate scandal directed media attention at these secret operations, and served as a proximate cause for these ongoing investigations. President Jimmy Carter discussed public concerns over secrecy in his campaign, and when he took office in January 1977 he attempted to reduce the scope of covert CIA operations. In a 2002 speech at Georgetown University, Prince Turki Al-Faisal of the GIP (Saudi Intelligence) described the situation like so:

In 1976, after the Watergate matters took place here, your intelligence community was literally tied up by Congress. It could not do anything. It could not send spies, it could not write reports, and it could not pay money. In order to compensate for that, a group of countries got together in the hope of fighting communism and established what was called the Safari Club. The Safari Club included France, Egypt, Saudi Arabia, Morocco, and Iran. The principal aim of this club was that we would share information with each other and help each other in countering Soviet influence worldwide, and especially in Africa.

As the Safari Club was beginning operations, former CIA Director Richard Helms and agent Theodore Shackley were under scrutiny from Congress and feared that new covert operations could be quickly exposed. Peter Dale Scott has classified the Safari Club as part of the "second CIA"—an extension of the organization's reach maintained by an autonomous group of key agents. Thus even as Carter's new CIA director Stansfield Turner attempted to limit the scope of the agency's operations, Shackley, his deputy Thomas Clines, and agent Edwin P. Wilson secretly maintained their connections with the Safari Club and the BCCI.

== Undercover operations without congressional oversight ==
The Safari Club used an informal division of labor in conducting its global operations. Saudi Arabia provided money, France provided high-end technology, and Egypt and Morocco supplied weapons and troops. The Safari Club typically coordinated with American and Israeli intelligence agencies.

=== Debut: Shaba Province of Zaire ===
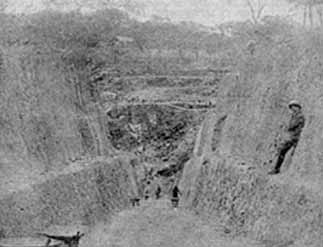
Mining operation in Shinkolobwe, the mining industry of the Democratic Republic of the Congo is rich in copper, cobalt, radium, and uranium

The Safari Club's first action came in March–April 1977, in response to the Shaba I conflict in Zaire after a call for support was made in the interest of protecting the French and Belgian mining operations in the country. The Safari Club answered and came to the aid of Zaire—led by the Western-backed and anti-communist Mobutu—in repelling an invasion by the Front for the National Liberation of the Congo (FNLC). France airlifted Moroccan and Egyptian troops into Shaba province and successfully repelled the attackers. Belgium and the United States also provided material support. The Shaba conflict served as a front in the Angolan Civil War and also helped to defend French and Belgian mining interests in the Congo.

The Safari Club ultimately provided US$5 million in assistance for Jonas Savimbi's National Union for the Total Independence of Angola (UNITA).

=== Egypt–Israel peace talks ===
The group helped to mediate talks between Egypt and Israel, leading to Sadat's visit to Jerusalem in 1977, the Camp David Accords in 1978, and the Egypt–Israel peace treaty in 1979. This process began with a Moroccan member of the Safari Club personally transporting a letter from Yitzhak Rabin to Sadat (and reportedly warning him of a Libyan assassination plot); this message was followed by secret talks in Morocco—supervised by King Hassan II—with Israeli general Moshe Dayan, Mossad director Yitzhak Hofi and Egyptian intelligence agent Hassan Tuhami. Immediately after CIA Director Stansfield Turner told an Israeli delegation that the CIA would no longer provide special favors to Israel, Shackley (who remained active in the Safari Club) contacted Mossad and presented himself as their CIA contact.

=== Ethiopia and Somalia ===
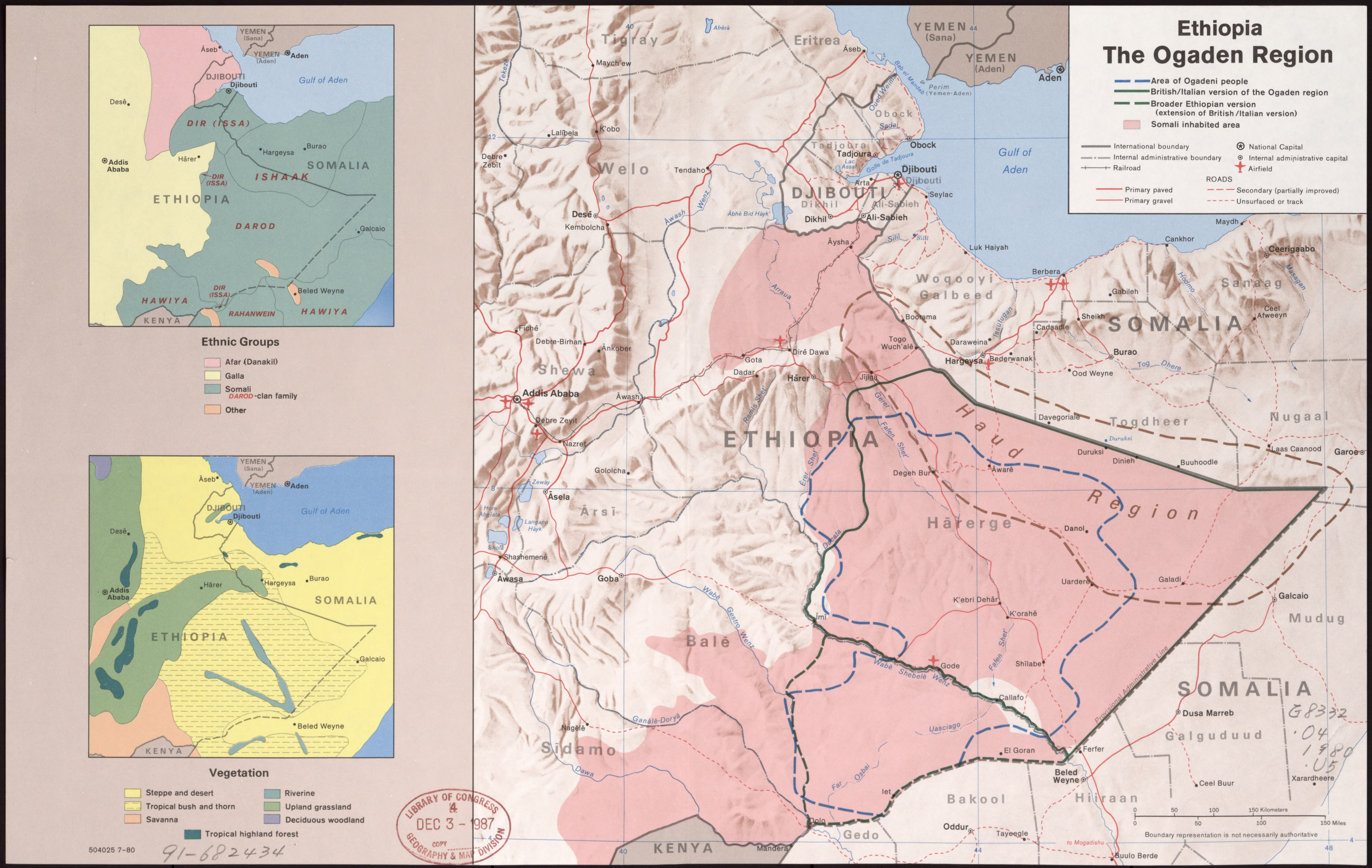
Map showing the Ogaden region (red) of Ethiopia in relation to Somalia

The Ogaden War erupted when Somalia sent its army to support the Western Somali Liberation Front (WSLF) in its effort to gain the independence of the (ethnically Somali) Ogaden region of Ethiopia. Prior to the war, the USSR had supported both states militarily. After failing to negotiate a ceasefire, the USSR intervened to defend Ethiopia. The Soviet-backed Ethiopian forces—supported by more than ten thousand troops from Cuba, more than one thousand military advisors, and about $1 billion worth of Soviet armaments—defeated the Somali army and WSLF.

The Ogaden War brought unique divergence between the policies of the US and the Safari Club. Iran sought to back Somalia in the war, but was rebuffed by the Carter administration. Israel had urged the United States to support Ethiopia against the Somalis and consulted with Washington over the issue, consequently the US made no protest about Israel's shipment of American arms support to the Ethiopians during the war. The Carter administration, perturbed by Somalia's unexpected aggressiveness, decided against backing Somalia, and the Shah of Iran was forced to deliver the message from Americans that, "You Somalis are threatening to upset the balance of world power." The Safari Club approached Somali leader Siad Barre and offered arms in exchange for repudiating the Soviet Union. Barre agreed, and Saudi Arabia paid Egypt $75 million for its older Soviet weapons. Iran supplied old weapons (reportedly including M-48 tanks) from the US.

But on 22 August 1980, Carter's Department of State announced a broad plan for military development in Somalia, including construction of a base as well as economic and military aid to the Somali National Army. This policy would continue into the Reagan administration. Only in the aftermath of the 1982 Ethiopian–Somali Border War was US military aid to Somalia significantly increased.

=== Arming and funding the Afghan mujahideen ===
Safari Club members, the BCCI, and the United States cooperated in arming and funding the Afghan mujahideen to oppose the Soviet Union (Operation Cyclone). The core of this plan was an agreement between the United States and Saudi Arabia to match each other in funding Afghan resistance to the USSR. Like military support for Somalia, this policy began in 1980 and continued into the Reagan administration.

== Further developments ==
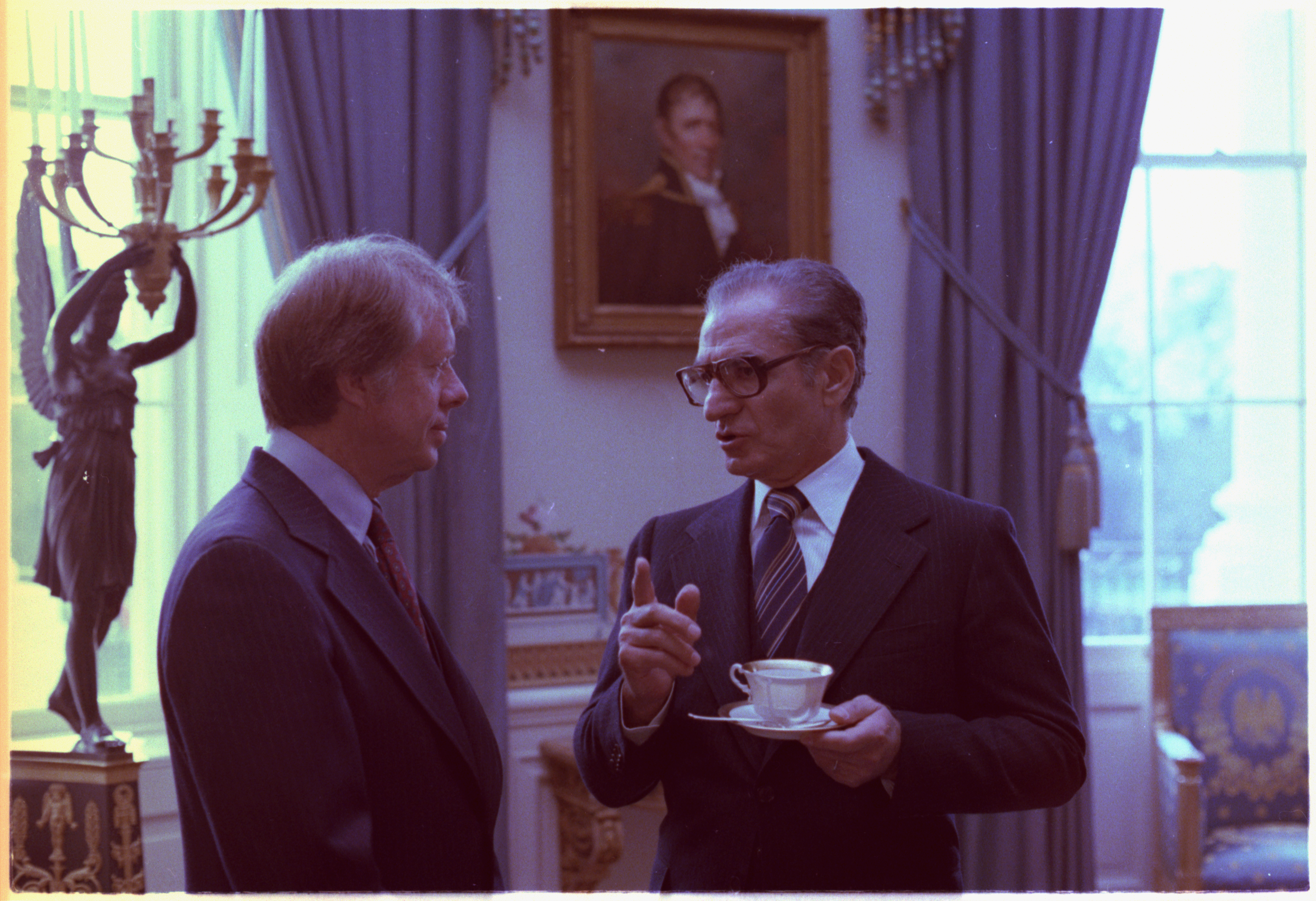
President Jimmy Carter and the Shah of Iran in the White House, 15 November 1977.

The Safari Club could not continue as it was when the 1978–1979 Iranian Revolution neutralized the Shah as an ally. However, arrangements between the remaining powers continued on the same course. William Casey, Ronald Reagan's campaign manager, succeeded Turner as director of the CIA. Casey took personal responsibility for maintaining contacts with Saudi intelligence, meeting monthly with Kamal Adham and then Prince Turki Al-Faisal. Some of the same actors were later connected to the Iran–Contra affair, and Saudi Arabia provided the funds for the attempted assassination of Sayyed Mohammad Hussein Fadlallah as well as a monthly stipend for the Contras.

The existence of the Safari Club was discovered by the Egyptian journalist Mohamed Hassanein Heikal, who was permitted to review documents confiscated during the Iranian Revolution.

== See also ==
- Foreign relations of South Africa during apartheid
- Halloween Massacre (Angola)
- Le Cercle
- Western Goals Foundation
- Operation Condor, Operation Timber Sycamore
