= Steven Hatfill =

American pathologist and bioweapons expert

- Born: Steven Jay Hatfill; October 24, 1953 (age 73); St. Louis, Missouri, U.S.
- Education: Southwestern College (BS); University of Zimbabwe (MBChB); University of Cape Town (MS); University of Stellenbosch
- Employer: US Administration for Strategic Preparedness and Response

Steven Jay Hatfill (born October 24, 1953) is an American pathologist and biological weapons expert. In 2002, he came to worldwide attention as a suspect in the 2001 anthrax attacks, a charge of which he was eventually exonerated, and later compensated for, after extensive litigation.

In 2020, Hatfill became an advisor to the first Trump White House, in which capacity he promoted the use of hydroxychloroquine to treat the COVID-19 virus despite FDA objections to the drug. After the 2020 election he participated in Donald Trump's attempt to overturn the election results.

In April 2025, Hatfill became a special advisor to the second Trump administration on the subject of pandemic preparedness. He was fired from the Department of Health and Human Services on October 27, 2025.

== Overview ==
Hatfill became the subject of extensive media coverage beginning in mid-2002, when he was a suspect in the 2001 anthrax attacks. His home was repeatedly raided by the FBI, his phone was tapped, and he was extensively surveilled for more than two years; he was also terminated from his job at Science Applications International Corporation (SAIC). At a news conference in August 2002, Hatfill denied that he had anything to do with the anthrax letters and said "irresponsible news media coverage based on government leaks" had "destroyed his reputation". He filed a lawsuit in 2003, accusing the FBI agents and Justice Department officials who led the criminal investigation of leaking information about him to the press in violation of the Privacy Act.

In 2008, the government settled Hatfill's lawsuit with a $4.6 million annuity, totalling $5.8 million in payment. The government officially exonerated him of any involvement in the anthrax attacks, and the Justice Department identified another military scientist, Bruce Edwards Ivins, as the sole perpetrator of the anthrax attacks. Jeffrey A. Taylor, the U.S. Attorney for the District of Columbia, wrote in a letter to Hatfill's lawyer that "we have concluded, based on laboratory access records, witness accounts and other information, that Dr. Hatfill did not have access to the particular anthrax used in the attacks, and that he was not involved in the anthrax mailings."

In 2004, Hatfill filed lawsuits against several periodicals and journalists who had identified him as a figure warranting further investigation in the anthrax attacks. He sued the New York Times Company and New York Times columnist Nicholas Kristof for defamation, defamation per se, and intentional infliction of emotional distress in connection with five of Kristof's columns in 2002. The courts dismissed this suit, finding that Hatfill was a limited-purpose public figure. In 2007, Hatfill settled a similar libel lawsuit against Vanity Fair and Reader's Digest for an undisclosed amount, after both magazines agreed to formally retract any implication that Hatfill was involved in the anthrax mailings.

In 2010, Hatfill was an independent researcher and an adjunct assistant professor of emergency medicine at the George Washington University Medical Center. He has criticized the response of health authorities to the Ebola virus epidemic in West Africa and suggested that it is possible that Ebola could be transmitted by aerosol, a position which other experts have criticized.

== Early life ==
Hatfill was born in St. Louis, Missouri, and graduated from Mattoon Senior High School, Mattoon, Illinois (1971), and Southwestern College in Winfield, Kansas (1975), where he studied biology.

Hatfill was enlisted as a private in the U.S. Army from 1975 to 1977. (In 1999, during an interview with a journalist, he claimed to have been a "captain in the U.S. Special Forces", but a subsequent investigation revealed that, according to the Army, he had never served with the Special Forces.) Following his Army discharge, Hatfill qualified and worked as a medical laboratory technician, but soon resolved to become a doctor. He worked as a medical missionary in Kapanga, Zaire, under a mentor, Dr. Glenn Eschtruth, who was murdered there in 1977. A brief marriage, from 1976 to 1978, to Eschtruth's daughter, Caroline Ruth Eschtruth, produced one daughter.

== Medical education ==
In 1978, Hatfill settled in Rhodesia (now Zimbabwe) and entered the Godfrey Huggins Medical School at the University of Rhodesia in Salisbury (now Harare). (His claimed military associations during this period included assistance as a medic with the Selous Scouts and membership in the Rhodesian SAS, but according to one journalist the regimental association of the latter is "adamant Hatfill never belonged to the unit".) After failing in 1983, he graduated in 1984 with an MB ChB degree and, from 1984 to 1985, completed a one-year internship at a small rural hospital in South Africa's North West Province. The South African government recruited him to be a medical officer on a 14-month tour of duty, from 1986 to 1988, in Antarctica with the South African National Antarctic Expedition (SANAE). In 1988, he completed a master's degree in microbiology at the University of Cape Town. Two years later, he worked toward a second master's degree—in medical biochemistry and radiation biology—at the University of Stellenbosch, while employed as a medical technician in the university's clinical haematology lab. A three-year haematological pathology residency at Stellenbosch from 1991 to 1993 followed. Hatfill also conducted research toward a Ph.D. between 1992 and 1995—under the supervision of microbiology professor Ralph Kirby at Rhodes University—on the treatment of leukemia with thalidomide.

Hatfill submitted his Ph.D. thesis for examination to Rhodes University in January 1995, but it failed in November. Hatfill later claimed to have completed a Ph.D. degree in "molecular cell biology" at Rhodes, as well as a post-doctoral fellowship (1994–95) at the University of Oxford in England and three master's degrees (in microbial genetics, medical biochemistry, and experimental pathology, respectively). Some of these credentials have been seriously questioned or disputed. During a later investigation, officials at Rhodes maintained that their institution had never awarded him a Ph.D. In 2007, Hatfill's lawyer Tom Connolly – in his lawsuit against former U.S. Attorney General John Ashcroft and the FBI – admitted that his client had "[p]uffed on his resume," falsely claiming he had earned a PhD and had "[f]orged a diploma" for the PhD.

Back in the United States, another of Hatfill's post-doctoral appointments commenced at the National Institute of Child Health and Human Development (NICHD), one of the National Institutes of Health (NIH) in Bethesda, Maryland, in 1995. He then worked from 1997 to 1999 as a civilian researcher at the United States Army Medical Research Institute of Infectious Diseases (USAMRIID), the U.S. Department of Defense's medical research institute for biological warfare (BW) defense at Fort Detrick, Frederick, Maryland. There, he studied, under a National Research Council fellowship, new drug treatments for the Ebola virus and became an authority on BW defense.

== Anthrax attacks ==
In January 1999, Hatfill transferred to a "consulting job" at Science Applications International Corporation (SAIC), which has a "sprawling campus" in nearby McLean, Virginia. The corporation worked for a multitude of federal agencies. Many projects were classified. Hatfill designed BW defense training curricula for government agencies.

By this time, there had been several hoax anthrax mailings in the United States. Hatfill and his collaborator, SAIC vice president Joseph Soukup, commissioned William C. Patrick, retired head of the old US bioweapons program (who had also been a mentor of Hatfill), to write a report on the possibilities of terrorist anthrax mailing attacks. Barbara Hatch Rosenberg (director of the Federation of American Scientists' biochem weapons working group in 2002) said that the report was commissioned "under a CIA contract to SAIC". But SAIC said Hatfill and Soukup had commissioned it internally – there was no outside client.

The resulting report, dated February 1999, was subsequently seen by some as a "blueprint" for the 2001 anthrax attacks. Amongst other things, it suggested the maximum amount of anthrax powder – 2.5 grams – that could be put in an envelope without making a suspicious bulge. The quantity in the envelope sent to Senator Patrick Leahy in October 2001 was 0.871 grams. After the attacks, the report drew the attention of the media and others and led to their investigation of Patrick and Hatfill.

=== Assertions by Rosenberg ===
As soon as it became known, in October 2001, that the Ames strain of anthrax had been used in the attacks, Barbara Hatch Rosenberg and others began suggesting that the mailings might be the work of a "rogue CIA agent" and they provided the name of the "most likely" person to the FBI. On November 21, 2001, Rosenberg made similar statements to the Biological and Toxic Weapons convention in Geneva. In December 2001, she published "A Compilation of Evidence and Comments on the Source of the Mailed Anthrax" via the website of the Federation of American Scientists (FAS) suggesting the attacks were "perpetrated with the unwitting assistance of a sophisticated government program".

Rosenberg discussed the case with reporters from the New York Times. On January 4, 2002, Nicholas Kristof of the New York Times published a column titled "Profile of a Killer" stating, "I think I know who sent out the anthrax last fall." For months, Rosenberg gave speeches and stated her beliefs to many reporters from around the world. She posted "Analysis of the Anthrax Attacks" to the FAS website on January 17, 2002. On February 5, 2002, she published an article called "Is the FBI Dragging Its Feet?" At the time, the FBI denied reports that investigators had identified a chief suspect, saying, "There is no prime suspect in this case at this time." The Washington Post reported that "FBI officials over the last week have flatly discounted Dr. Rosenberg's claims."

On June 13, 2002, Rosenberg posted "The Anthrax Case: What the FBI Knows" to the FAS site. Five days later, Rosenberg presented her theories to Senate staffers working for Senators Daschle and Leahy. On June 25, the FBI publicly searched Hatfill's apartment, turning him into a household name. "The FBI also pointed out that Hatfill had agreed to the search and is not considered a suspect." The American Prospect reported in June 2002: "Hatfill is not a suspect in the anthrax case, the FBI says." On August 3, 2002, Rosenberg told the media that the FBI had asked her if "a team of government scientists could be trying to frame Steven J. Hatfill."

=== Person of interest ===
In August 2002, U.S. Attorney General John Ashcroft labelled Hatfill a "person of interest" in a press conference, although no charges were brought against him. Hatfill, who researched viruses, vehemently denied having any connection to the anthrax mailings and sued the FBI, the Justice Department, John Ashcroft, Alberto Gonzales, and others for violating his constitutional rights and the Privacy Act. On June 27, 2008, the Department of Justice announced it would settle Hatfill's case for $5.8 million.

Hatfill later went to work at Pennington Biomedical Research Center in Baton Rouge, Louisiana. In September 2001, SAIC was commissioned by the Pentagon to create a replica of a mobile WMD "laboratory", alleged to have been used by Saddam Hussein, then President of Iraq. The Pentagon said the trailer was to be used as a training aid for teams seeking weapons of mass destruction in Iraq.

His lawyer, Victor M. Glasberg, stated: "Steve's life has been devastated by a drumbeat of innuendo, implication and speculation. We have a frightening public attack on an individual who, guilty or not, should not be exposed to this type of public opprobrium based on speculation."

In an embarrassing incident, FBI agents trailing Hatfill in a motor vehicle ran over his foot when he attempted to approach them in May 2003. Police responding to the incident did not cite the driver, but issued Hatfill a citation for "walking to create a hazard". He and his attorneys fought the ticket, but a hearing officer upheld the ticket and ordered Hatfill to pay the requisite $5 fine.

FBI Director Robert Mueller changed leadership of the investigation in late 2006, and at that time, another suspect, USAMRIID bacteriologist Bruce Ivins, became the main focus of the investigation. Considerable questions were raised about the credibility of the case against Ivins, as well.

=== 60 Minutes interview ===
Hatfill's lawyer, Tom Connolly, was featured in a 60 Minutes interview about the anthrax incidents on March 11, 2007. In the interview, Connolly revealed that Hatfill faked his Ph.D. degree: "It is true. He has indeed puffed on his resume. Absolutely. Forged a diploma. Yes, that's true." He went on to state, "Listen, if puffing on your resume made you the anthrax killer, then half this town should be suspects."

The Washington Post Magazine stated in 2003 that Hatfill had obtained an anti-anthrax medicine (ciprofloxacin, which is an antibiotic medication) immediately before the anthrax mailings. Connolly explained to 60 Minutes, "Before the attacks, he had surgery. So yes, he's on Cipro. But the fuller truth is, in fact he was on Cipro because a doctor gave it to him after sinus surgery." Hatfill had previously said the antibiotic was for a lingering sinus infection. The omission in the Times' article of the reason why he had been taking Cipro is one reason Hatfill sued the newspaper. The newspaper won a summary judgment ruling in early 2007, squelching the libel suit that had been filed by Steven Hatfill against it and columnist Nicholas Kristof.

== Lawsuits ==
=== Hatfill v. John Ashcroft, et al. ===
In August 2003, Hatfill sued U.S. Attorney General John Ashcroft, the U.S. Department of Justice, the FBI, FBI Supervisory Special Agent Van Harp, two DOJ employees, and an unknown number of FBI agents, alleging that the government denied his constitutional rights and attempted to scapegoat him for the anthrax attacks. The suit was filed in the U.S. District Court for the District of Columbia.

In March 2007, U.S. District Judge Reggie Walton allowed Hatfill to re-subpoena various reporters, seeking the names of government sources who had told reporters that Hatfill was under investigation. During an earlier round of discovery, Hatfill issued subpoenas to six reporters (Michael Isikoff and Daniel Klaidman of Newsweek, Brian Ross of ABC, Allan Lengel of The Washington Post, Jim Stewart of CBS, and Toni Locy of USA Today). In the second round of subpoenas, Hatfill subpoenaed eight news outlets, including three not previously subpoenaed. The federal government opposed Hatfill's move as an impermissible expansion of discovery.

In March 2008, Walton held Toni Locy of USA Today in contempt of court for declining to identify her sources, fining her $500 per day, escalating to $5,000 a day, until she identified her sources. On appeal, the U.S. Court of Appeals for the D.C. Circuit suspended the fines against Locy, and in November 2008 threw out the order because the case had settled. Locy's position was supported by the Reporters Committee for Freedom of the Press and Reporters Without Borders and she received the National Press Club's John Aubuchon Freedom of the Press Award for her stance.

In January 2008, Walton ordered the parties to attempt mediation, and set a tentative trial date of December 2008 if settlement talks failed. In June 2008, a settlement was announced, in which the Justice Department agreed to pay $4.6 million (consisting of $2.825 million in cash and an annuity paying $150,000 a year for 20 years) to Hatfill. The settlement did not include an admission of liability by the government.

=== Hatfill v. The New York Times ===
In June 2003, Hatfill sued The New York Times Company and Nicholas D. Kristof for defamation in Virginia state court. Hatfill alleged that Kristof had published columns implying that he was responsible for the anthrax mailings, and thus defamed him. He refiled the suit in federal court in July 2004, alleging defamation and intentional infliction of emotional distress. After filing his complaint, Hatfill voluntarily dropped Kristof as a defendant because the federal district court lacked personal jurisdiction over the columnist.

The federal district court initially granted the newspaper's motion to dismiss, holding that the language in Kristof's columns could not reasonably read as accusing Hatfill of responsibility for anthrax attacks, and that the columns reported information on the federal investigation into Hatfill, without accusing him of guilt. The U.S. Court of Appeals for the Fourth Circuit, in July 2005, reversed this ruling (holding that "Kristof's columns, taken together, are capable of defamatory meaning under Virginia law") and returned the case to the district court for further proceedings.

In January 2007, Judge Claude M. Hilton threw out Hatfill's defamation suit against The New York Times, granting summary judgment to the newspaper. The court held that Hatfill was either a "public figure" or "public official" and thus could only prevail in a defamation suit if the defendants acted with actual malice, and that Hatfill could not demonstrate that Kristof had acted with actual malice. The court additionally found that Hatfill could not, as a matter of law, meet his burden of proof that the allegedly defamatory statements were materially false; it also threw out his claim for intentional infliction of emotional distress.

In July 2008, the Fourth Circuit, in a unanimous decision, affirmed the district court's ruling. In December 2008, the Supreme Court declined to hear an appeal, leaving the newspaper's win intact.

=== Hatfill v. Foster ===
Donald Wayne Foster, an expert in forensic linguistics and a professor at Vassar College, advised the FBI during the investigation of the anthrax attacks. He later wrote an article for Vanity Fair about his investigation of Hatfill. In the October 2003 article (entitled ""The Message in the Anthrax"), Foster described how he had tried to match up Hatfill's travels with the postmarks on the anthrax letters, and analyzed old interviews and an unpublished novel by Hatfill about a bioterror attack on the United States. Foster wrote that "When I lined up Hatfill's known movements with the postmark locations of reported biothreats, those hoax anthrax attacks appeared to trail him like a vapor cloud."

In 2004, Hatfill sued Foster and Condé Nast Publications, alleging defamation. He also sued The Reader's Digest Association (which had published a condensed version of the article—entitled "Tracking The Anthrax Killer"—in the December 2003 issue of Reader's Digest). In 2007, the defendants settled the case before trial on undisclosed terms. A statement by Vanity Fair issued after the settlement was announced read: "To the extent any statements contained in the article might be read to convey that Condé Nast and Professor Foster were accusing Dr. Hatfill of perpetrating these attacks, Condé Nast and Professor Foster retract any such implication."

=== Hatfill case against blogger ===
Hatfill obtained from Google the IP address behind the blog of one "Luigi Warren" hosted by Google's Blogspot web-hosting service. According to Newsweek, "Luigi Warren" had "operated a lurid rumor mill about Hatfill for more than a decade–promoting, in particular, hearsay about the years he lived and worked in southern Africa during the throes of apartheid." In 2010, Hatfill's attorneys sent a letter to a stem-cell research scientist at Harvard Medical School whom they accused of authoring the "Luigi Warren" posts. The Harvard researcher, however, did not make the posts in question, and instead maintained a different blog, in which he wrote that "the campaign to promote Steven Hatfill as a 'person of interest' ... was a bureaucratic ruse or diversion to maintain a useful strategic ambiguity." The Harvard researcher believed that someone was impersonating him. Google revealed the IP address for the blog, which was traced to a computer at Stellenbosch University in South Africa (Hatfill's alma mater); the university identified a radiation oncologist as the user of the computer in question, and the blogger later agreed to an undisclosed settlement.

== Post-settlement life ==
=== 2010s ===
Since the settlements of his legal cases, which included receiving $5.8 million (less legal costs) from the Justice Department (2008) and undisclosed sums from Condé Nast (2008) and the South African medical researcher (2010), Hatfill has pursued activities as an independent researcher. He was appointed an adjunct assistant professor of emergency medicine at the George Washington University Medical Center in 2010. In 2011, he added additional affiliations at GW in "Clinical Research and Leadership" and "Microbiology, Immunology, and Tropical Medicine". (His BA degree and one MS degree — but not his other previously claimed medical degrees — appear on the GW Faculty Directory.) He oversaw construction of a "state-of-the-art boat" on which to conduct his own scientific trials. He has allocated more than $1 million of his own money to construct a full-scale prototype of what he calls Beagle III. This craft, with a crew of military veterans and scientists, would ply the waters of "high-biodiversity areas" – the Amazon, or the great rivers of Borneo – seeking and studying rare plants and fungi as sources of new drugs. A Newsweek interviewer has described ...

...Hatfill's unbuilt, twin-diesel-powered boat. Inside the vessel's aluminum hull, he envisioned a plexus of laboratories, with DNA microarrays and other "space-age zuzu" for analyzing the genetic compositions of plants. Bedrooms would be equipped with video-conferencing systems and DVD players, and the executive cabin was modeled after the president's quarters on Air Force One...Hatfill had also thrown in a roof-mounted cosmic ray detector, which would switch on near the equator to capture data on "high-energy cosmic ray showers". An onboard chef from the ranks of Le Cordon Bleu would fuel a crew of scientists and trainees, and a 30-day supply of dehydrated food would hedge against disaster.

Hatfill owns a colonial-style brick home in Marion County, Florida as well as a property in the El Yunque rain forest, in Puerto Rico, where he has run a military-style Outward Bound-like program. Hatfill chairs the Asymmetrical Biodiversity Studies and Observation Group (ABSOG) in Malaysia, a not-for-profit trust he has established to support his drug discovery boat mission. Hatfill has also established Templar Associates II, a for-profit corporation in Puerto Rico as a revenue-generator and as an "environmental testing ground for new tactics, techniques, equipment, and procedures for ABSOG's designated mission as well as for the U.S. military".

Hatfill is also the medical director of EFP Tactical Medical Group, a London-based company that provides integrated training, security and tactical medical support services to government agencies, private corporations, and NGOs worldwide. (EFP Tacmed has extensive Middle Eastern and African contracts; it operates a remote jungle-training facility to test new equipment in "high-biodiversity areas".) He is also a board member of Doctors for Disaster Preparedness, a politically conservative Arizona-based non-profit described by some journalists as a "political fringe group". He claims status as a fellow of the Explorers Club.

In 2014, Hatfill publicly criticized the response of U.S. public health authorities to the Ebola virus epidemic in West Africa and suggested that it is possible that Ebola could be transmitted by aerosol, an assertion which other experts have disputed; his views on this have been characterized as misrepresentations of the primary scientific literature by other experts.

In November 2019, Hatfill and two other authors self-published Three Seconds Until Midnight. The book examines current preparedness and unpreparedness for a devastating future influenza pandemic.

=== 2020s ===
In 2020, during the COVID-19 pandemic, Hatfill was interviewed on several right-wing media outlets including Stephen Bannon's War Room: Pandemic, The Epoch Times, and Sinclair Broadcast Group's Full Measure with Sharyl Attkisson. He opposed the U.S. response to the pandemic, particularly the exclusion of hydroxychloroquine for early treatment of COVID-19, making unproven claims that the low fatality rate experienced by some nations is the result of their early use of the drug.

In February 2020, Hatfill became an unpaid advisor to White House trade director Peter Navarro on the subject of the coronavirus pandemic. He interacted directly with senior officials at the Department of Health and Human Services (HHS), the Food and Drug Administration (FDA), and the White House, and he represented the administration in dealings with health care companies. Early in the pandemic he urged Navarro to quickly acquire tests and supplies, although he said such supplies should come only from U.S. sources. In an email to White House chief of staff Mark Meadows he said the president was being "grossly misadvised" by the White House Coronavirus Task Force, and recommended that the virus should be fought by widespread proactive administration of hydroxychloroquine, a malaria drug which the FDA had declared ineffective and potentially harmful to use for coronavirus. He repeatedly attacked Anthony Fauci and FDA commissioner Stephen Hahn, at one point telling Fauci that he was "full of crap". Although the two were not removed from the task force as he urged, they were increasingly sidelined by Donald Trump.

Following the November 2020 election, Hatfill became an active participant in Trump's efforts to overturn the election results, flying to Arizona to help challenge its election results, writing proposals for "Trump's Legal Fight", and sharing anti-Biden rumors. According to House Majority Whip James E. Clyburn (D-S.C.) who chairs the House Select subcommittee investigating the COVID-19 crisis, "Dr. Hatfill has refused to provide documents and misleadingly downplayed his involvement in the pandemic response in communications with Select Subcommittee staff".

In May 2025, it was announced that Hatfill had been hired by the second Trump administration as a senior HHS advisor in the Administration for Strategic Preparedness and Response. In an interview with the Washington Post, he said he would be working to prepare for future pandemics. Hatfill also reiterated his belief that hydroxychloroquine was safe and effective for COVID, contrary to evidence showing that it does not work and may cause harm.

On October 28, 2025, the New York Times reported that Hatfill had been fired from his position as a senior adviser at the Department of Health and Human Services.
