= Dilala =

Commune of the city of Kolwezi in the Democratic Republic of the Congo

- Commune
- Location within Democratic Republic of the Congo
- Coordinates: 10.716°S 25.465°E
- Country: Democratic Republic of the Congo
- Province: Lualaba
- City: Kolwezi

Dilala is a commune of the city of Kolwezi in the Lualaba Province of the Democratic Republic of the Congo.

Dilala is the site of significant mining operations, including artisanal and small-scale miners and child miners. Many miners operate outside the law, and miners have been killed in landslides and other mining accidents.

Dilala is also home to the Dilala Central Prison, which has suffered from severe overcrowding for years, with 1500 inmates in a prison intended to hold 600. This contributed to prisoner deaths from asphyxiation in 2019 and an April 2026 mpox outbreak.
