= Person of interest =

Term used by U.S. and Canadian law enforcement

"Person of interest" is a term used by law enforcement in the United States, Canada, and other countries when identifying someone possibly involved in a criminal investigation who has not been arrested or formally accused of a crime. It has no legal meaning, but refers to someone in whom the police and/or domestic intelligence services are "interested", either because the person is cooperating with the investigation, may have information that would assist the investigation, or possesses certain characteristics that merit further attention.

While terms such as suspect, target, and material witness have clear and sometimes formal definitions, person of interest remains undefined by the U.S. Department of Justice. Unsub is a similar term which is short for "unknown subject" (used in the TV show Criminal Minds). Person of interest is usually used as a euphemism for suspect, and its careless use may encourage trials by media.

With respect to terrorism investigations, Eric Lichtblau wrote in the New York Times: "Law enforcement officials say that the term simply reflects the new tactics required to fight terrorism. But some legal scholars say officials are trying to create a more benign public image, even as their power expands."

== History ==
This phrase was first utilized by law enforcement in 1986, during the investigation of the Green River Killer. It was coined by Fae Brooks, a member of the King County Sheriff's Department at the time of the investigation.

According to Eric Lichtbau in The New York Times:

The term has an ugly history; in the 1960s American law enforcement officials began creating secret dossiers on Vietnam War protesters, civil rights leaders and other persons of interest...The vaguely sinister term has been applied to targets of terrorism investigations, the chief suspect in the murder of the Baylor basketball player Patrick Dennehy and Steven J. Hatfill, the scientist who has figured prominently in the investigation into the 2001 anthrax attacks...Attorney General John Ashcroft is often credited with popularizing the person-of-interest label, having used it [in 2002] to describe Dr. Hatfill.

The term was used widely in mass media at least as early as the 1996 Atlanta Olympics bombing in reference to Richard A. Jewell. Its initial uses aroused controversy, but it has since seen increasingly regular use. Jewell later remarked on the use of the term:

Question: Do you believe that the public will formulate the same idea about that person's involvement in criminal activity upon hearing the term "person of interest"? Is this just a euphemism, just another way of saying "suspect"? Jewell: I'd say so. The public knows what's going on. Because of what happened to me, things have changed. It has definitely changed the way the media in Atlanta refer to people that are arrested or are suspects. And I've seen it on some of the national channels like Fox News, NBC and CNN. They've all changed. Go back before 1996, at a shooting or a murder and see how they refer to the person whom they're arresting in the incident. Compare that with something that's recent and look at the difference. What happened to me is a factor in that change.

=== Hatfill v. Ashcroft ===
The use of the term became widely critiqued when United States Attorney General John Ashcroft used it in a press conference when asked if Dr. Steven J. Hatfill was a suspect in the 2001 anthrax attacks case. In 2002, Hatfill's attorney filed a complaint with the Justice Department's Office of Professional Responsibility, arguing that "the term is not recognized in law or criminal procedure and that Ashcroft did not have the right 'to preside over the public shredding of [Hatfill's] life. This is un-American. Mr. Ashcroft owes Dr. Hatfill an apology.'" Hatfill sued the Department of Justice for violation of federal privacy law; the case was settled in 2008 for $5.8 million.

== Definition ==
Normal Justice Department parlance for subjects of investigation includes "suspect", "subject" and "target". Each has specific meanings relevant to different levels of investigation. Senator Chuck Grassley, Republican of Iowa, wrote to the Attorney General for clarification of the unfamiliar phrase in September 2002. In December of that year, Nuclear Threat Initiative's Global Security Newswire summarized the response as follows:

... the U.S. Justice Department has said that it did not intend for Hatfill to come under such intense media scrutiny by describing him has a "person of interest" in the anthrax investigation, according to department letters sent to Senator Charles Grassley (R-Iowa), which were released yesterday. ... The department did not intend to cause any harm to Hatfill when it described him as a person of interest, Assistant Attorney General Daniel Bryant said in one of the letters. Instead, the department meant "to deflect media scrutiny" and "explain that he (Hatfill) was just one of many scientists" who had cooperated with the FBI investigation, Bryant said. Grassley said yesterday that he appreciates the department's replies to his inquiries. "I also appreciate the department's candidness that the action regarding Mr. Hatfill and his employment is unprecedented," Grassley said in a statement, and that "there is no ... formal definition for the term 'person of interest.'"

== In fiction ==
The term is also used by the SCP Foundation to identify individuals, often affiliated with Groups of Interest (GoI), that are believed to be involved in anomalous activity. The Foundation monitors, and if necessary, detains and questions Persons of Interest in order to gain information about anomalies or GoIs, and to prevent public knowledge of anomalies ("upholding the Veil").

The term Person of Interest has also been used as the titles of a 2024 British TV film and of an American 2011-2016 crime/espionage television series.

== See also ==
- Targeted surveillance
