= Shaba II =

Historical military conflict

- Part of the Shaba Invasions, Katanga insurgency, and the Cold War
Date	11 May – June 1978
Location	Shaba, Zaire
Result	Zairian victory; mutual end of support for other nations' rebel groups

Belligerents
Zaire; France; Belgium; Morocco; United States	FLNC

Commanders and leaders
(Zaire) Mobutu Sese Seko; (France) Guy Méry; (France) Valéry Giscard d'Estaing; (France) (Croatia) Ante Gotovina; (Belgium) Leo Tindemans; (Morocco) Abdelkader Loubaris; (United States) John C. Stetson	Nathaniel Mbumba

Casualties and losses
Zaire: 14 killed 8 wounded Civilians: 500 killed France: 11 killed 20 wounded Belgium: 1 killed Morocco: 1 paratrooper killed European civilians: 120 killed United States: 1 aircraft slightly damaged 1 crewman wounded	Katanga: ~250–400 killed 160 captured

Shaba II was a brief conflict fought in the Zairean province of Shaba (now Katanga) in 1978. The conflict broke out on 11 May 1978 after 6,500 rebels from the Congolese National Liberation Front (FNLC), a Katangese separatist militia, crossed the border from Angola into Zaire in an attempt to achieve the province's secession from the Zairian regime of Mobutu Sese Seko. The FNLC captured the important mining town of Kolwezi.

== Foreign involvement ==
The Mobutist government appealed for foreign assistance and French and Belgian military intervention beat back the invasion, just as in 1977.

The U.S. and Cuba coerced Angola and Zaire into negotiations leading to a non-aggression pact. That ended support for insurgencies in each other's countries. Zaire temporarily cut off support to the Front for the Liberation of the Enclave of Cabinda (FLEC), the National Liberation Front of Angola (FNLA) and the National Union for the Total Independence of Angola (UNITA), and Angola forbade further activity by the Shaba separatists.

The U.S. worked with France in repelling the invaders in the first military co-operation between the two since the Vietnam War. U.S. Air Force elements involved included a Combat Control Team (air traffic controllers) of the 435th Tactical Airlift Wing, the 445th Airlift Wing, and other airlift wings.

== Battle of Kolwezi ==
The French Foreign Legion's 2 Foreign Paratroop Regiment had 600 troops, who took back Kolwezi after a seven-day battle and airlifted 2,250 European citizens to Belgium but not before the FNLC had massacred 80 Europeans and 200 Africans. In one instance, the FNLC killed 34 European civilians who had hidden in a room. However, Zairean helicopter pilot Pierre Yambuya claims that many of the civilian deaths were caused by Zairian armed forces, not the FLNC.

== Conclusion ==
The FNLC retreated to Zambia and back to Angola, vowing to return. The Zairian armed forces (Forces Armées Zaïroises) forcibly evicted civilians along Shaba's 105-kilometre-long (65 mi) border with Angola, and Mobutu ordered them to shoot on sight.

== See also ==
- Angolan Civil War
- Cuban intervention in Angola
- Shaba I
