= Kolwezi =

Kolwezi Mji wa Kolwezi/Jiji la Kolwezi (Swahili)
- Provincial capital and city
- Ville de Kolwezi
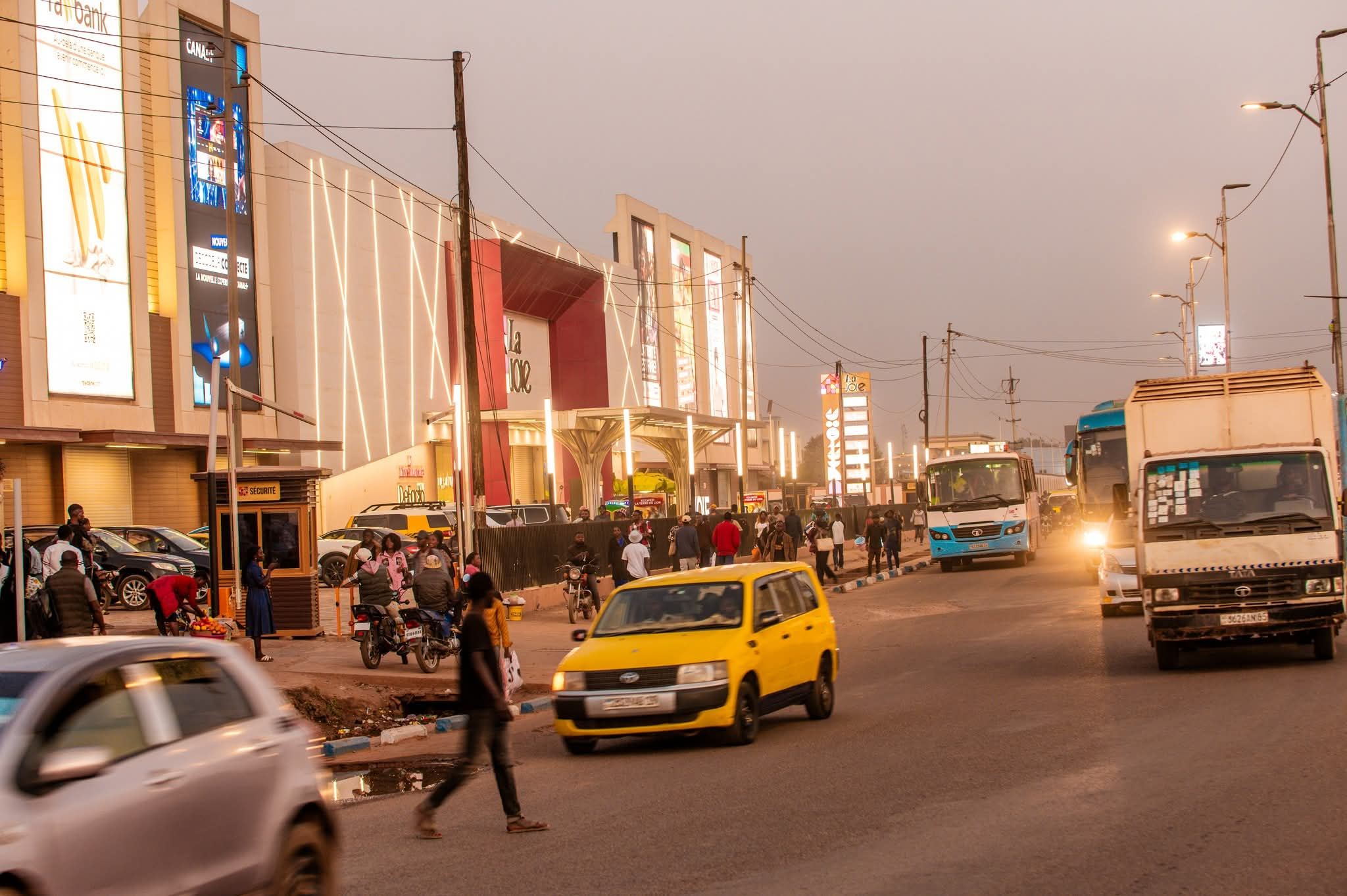
- N39 Highway and in the left the La Joie Mall.

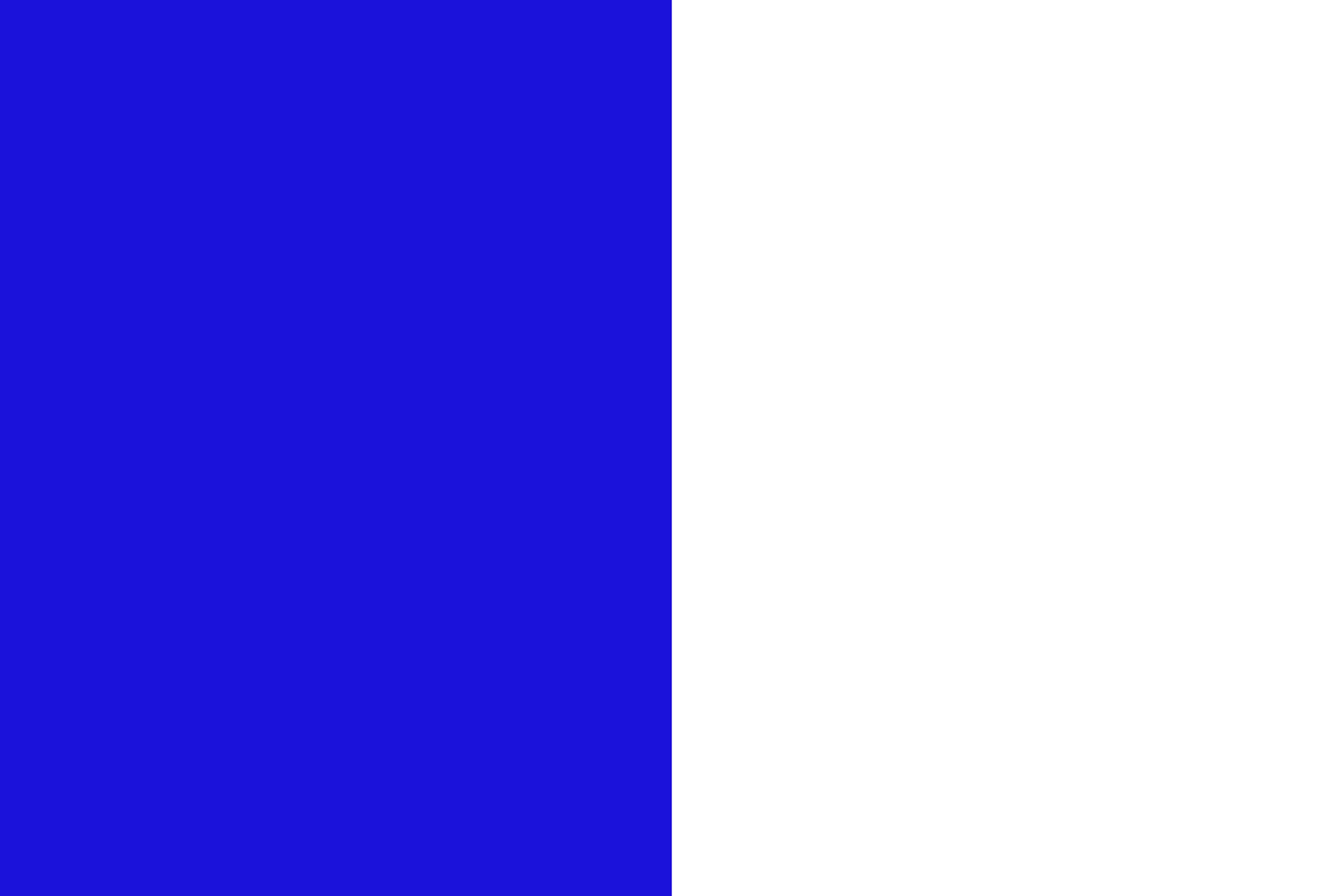
- Flag

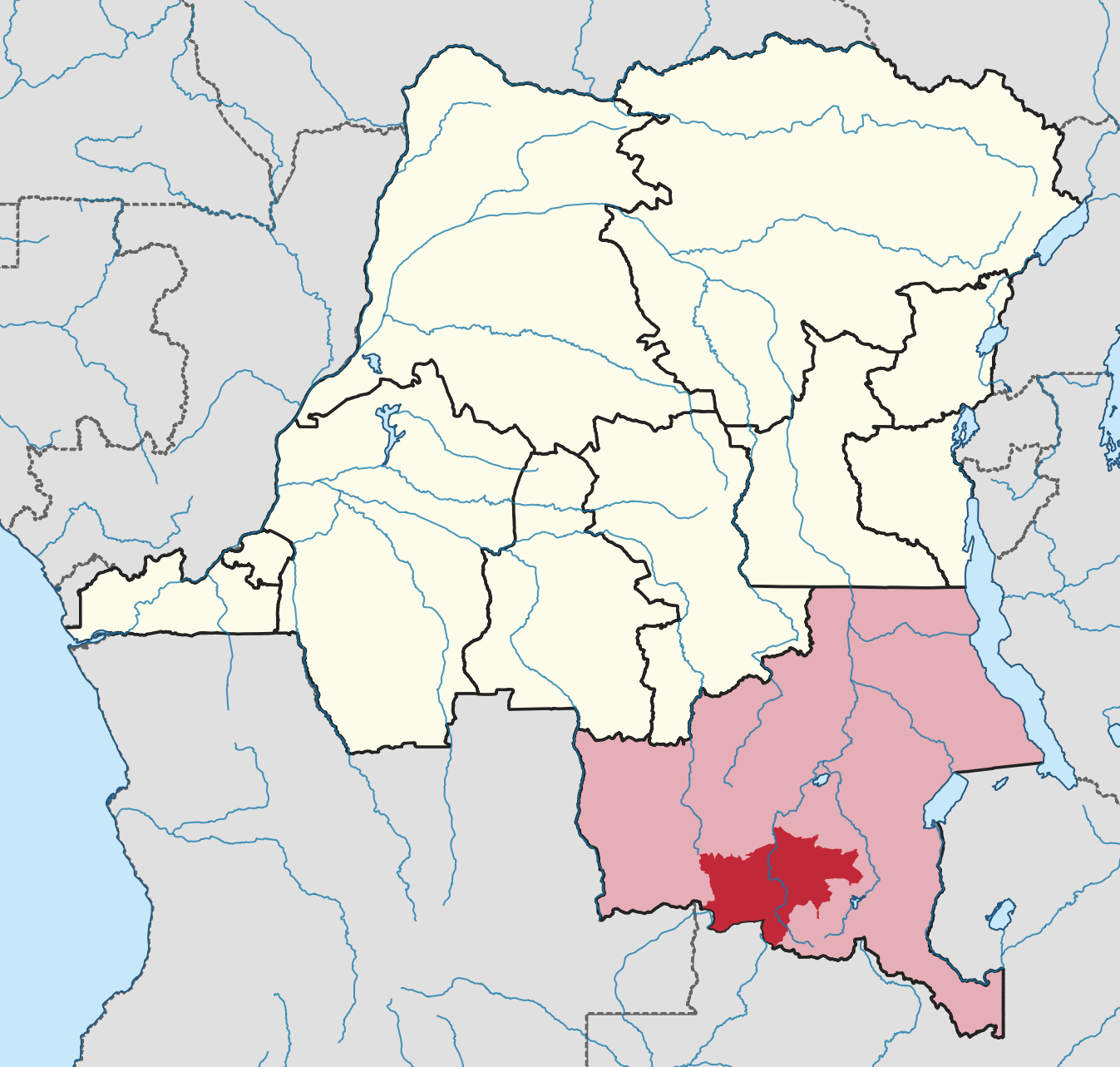
- Former district until 2015

- Location in the Democratic Republic of the Congo
- Coordinates: 10°43′S 25°28′E
- Country: DR Congo
- Province: Lualaba
- Founded: 1938
- City status: 1971
- District: 1976–2015
- Founded by: Union Minière
- Communes: Dilala, Manika

Government
  - Mayor: Jacques Masengo

Area
  - City: 213 km^{2} (82 sq mi)
- Elevation: 1,448 m (4,751 ft)

Population (2015)
  - City: 572,942
  - Density: 2,690/km^{2} (6,970/sq mi)
  - Urban: 480,000
- Time zone: UTC+2 (Central Africa Time)
- Climate: Cwa

Kolwezi or Kolwesi is the capital city of Lualaba Province in the south of the Democratic Republic of the Congo, west of Likasi. It has an airport and a railway to Lubumbashi. Just outside of Kolwezi there is the static inverter plant of the HVDC Inga-Shaba. The population is approximately 573,000.

Before the creation of Lualaba province in 2015, Kolwezi had two territories attached to it to create the Kolwezi District.

== History ==
The general area of Kolwezi was once known as Keshila. It was conquered by Xind and Konokesh, two agents of Yavu a Newej who were over the eastern expansion of the Lunda Empire in the 1730s or so.

The settlement was created in 1938 to be the headquarters for the western mining group of the Union Minière du Haut Katanga. In 1971 it obtained city status and consisted of the communes of Dilala and Manika. In 1976 the territories of Lubudi and Mutshatsha, both previously part of Lualaba District, were attached to it to form the Kolwezi District (districts were called sub-regions at the time). In the 2015 repartitioning this was undone, the two territories and the city proper became separate parts of Lualaba province with the city as capital of the new province.

=== Battle of Kolwezi (1978) ===
On Saturday, 13 May 1978, ex-Katangese soldiers supported by Angola occupied the city. The government of Zaire asked Belgium, France, Morocco and the United States to restore order. The 2e REP, an elite paratroopers unit of the French Foreign Legion, were sent in to drive out the rebels and rescue any hostages. The Belgian army also deployed a force of some 750 Paracommando Regiment paratroopers and moved out just over 1,800 Europeans to other cities in the region. 700 Africans, including 250 rebels, 170 European hostages and 6 paratroopers died.

== Orientation ==
Kolwezi is set on an arid plain in the south of the Democratic Republic of Congo. Upon its establishment in 1937 by the Union Minière du Haut-Katangahe, the company cleared the land of the acacias and miombo trees that once grew atop Kolwezi’s rich mineral deposits. They subsequently built a simple low-rise town across the area’s rolling hills, with wide streets and bungalows for Europeans, whose neighborhoods were segregated from the poorly built ones where Congolese workers lived.

The N39 highway runs through the center of town on a northwest-southeast axis. Large open pit cobalt mines are located to the west and north of the city center. Rond Point de L'Indépendance is the traditional center of the city with more formally laid out neighborhoods located to the west of the traffic circle. The center of the city contains administrative offices, dozens of guesthouses and hotels, banks and restaurants. Mutoshi Technical Institute is located on the eastern edge of the city. Kolwezi has several medical clinics and hospitals along with dozens of primary and secondary schools.

=== Dilala ===
Dilala Is an upscale neighborhood located in the center of Kolwezi. The area is home to several foreign workers and a number of guest houses. Manika Stadium is located in the Dilala neighborhood. Kolwezi's Central Train Station is located on the eastern edge of the neighborhood with train service to Likasi and Lubumbashi.

== Economy ==
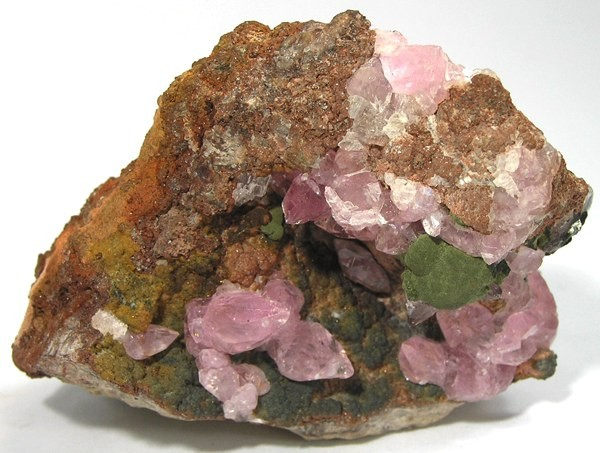
A specimen of Kolwezite (green), a rare copper-cobalt mineral named after Kolwezi, and pink cobaltoan calcite.

Kolwezi is an important mining centre for copper and cobalt. There are also uranium, radium, oxide ores, and lime deposits. The Musonoi mine is a set of open-cut pits near Kolwezi from which copper and other metals have been extracted since the 1940s. The nearby Lake Nzilo was created by damming the Lualaba River to provide a source of hydroelectric power and a reservoir of water for the mining activities. The rapid growth of the cobalt mining industry has caused a recent surge in the city's population.

== Climate ==
Kolwezi has a tropical savanna climate (Köppen Aw), close to being classified as a dry-winter humid subtropical climate (Cwa), or a subtropical highland climate (Cwb). It features very warm, rainy summers and warm, dry winters with cool mornings. Most rainfall occurs during summer and early autumn, and the annual average is 45.8 inches or 1,160 millimetres.

Climate data for Kolwezi
Month	Jan	Feb	Mar	Apr	May	Jun	Jul	Aug	Sep	Oct	Nov	Dec	Year
Mean daily maximum °C (°F)	26 (79)	27 (80)	27 (80)	27 (80)	27 (80)	25 (77)	26 (79)	28 (83)	30 (86)	30 (86)	27 (80)	26 (79)	27 (81)
Mean daily minimum °C (°F)	16 (60)	16 (60)	16 (60)	15 (59)	13 (56)	11 (51)	11 (51)	13 (55)	14 (58)	16 (60)	16 (60)	16 (60)	14 (58)
Average rainfall mm (inches)	130 (5.2)	170 (6.5)	230 (9)	66 (2.6)	5.1 (0.2)	0 (0)	0 (0)	0 (0)	5.1 (0.2)	66 (2.6)	260 (10.2)	240 (9.3)	1,160 (45.8)
Source: Weatherbase

== Transportation ==
=== Road ===
The city is crossed by Transafrican Highway 9 (TAH 9), which connects it to the cities of Lubumbashi and Dilolo.

=== Rail ===
The city of Kolwezi has one of the main railway stations in Congo, from where mineral loads and passengers board every day. The station receives trains from the Benguela railway.

=== Air ===
The Kolwezi Airport serves Kolwezi and the surrounding area. The airport is located about 6 km (4 mi) south of Kolwezi.

== Education ==
The University of Kolwezi has launched the first digital library in the Democratic Republic of Congo. Many children who attend school in Kolwezi have also worked in the mines.

== Notable people ==
- Grace Geyoro (1997), footballer for France and captain of Paris Saint-Germain

== See also ==
- University of Kolwezi
- Shaba I
- Shaba II
- Angolan Civil War
