= Congolese National Liberation Front =

Congolese left-wing armed group and political party

- Front de libération nationale congolaise
- Leaders: Nathaniel Mbumba; Kapend Elie Kanyimbu
- Dates active: 1968–1991 (as an armed group)
- Headquarters: Luanda, Angola
- Ideology: Lumumbism; Marxism-Leninism; Socialism
- Political position: Left-wing
- Size: 1,600–3,000

Shaba Province, Zaire.

The Congolese National Liberation Front (French: Front de libération nationale congolaise; FLNC) was a Congolese left-wing rebel group and political party consisting of former members of the Katangese Gendarmerie. It was active mainly in Angola and Zaire (present-day Democratic Republic of the Congo) during the 1970s.

The FLNC was formed in Angola under the leadership of Nathaniel Mbumba, with the goal of overthrowing Mobutu Sese Seko, the leader of Zaire. The FLNC is best known for its two attempted invasions of Katanga Province (renamed Shaba Province) in Zaire in 1977 and 1978. These incursions, which threatened Mobutu's regime, sparked two international wars, Shaba I and Shaba II, further complicating the Angolan Civil War. The FLNC was legalised in 1991 and fought alongside government forces in the First Congo War.

== Foundation ==
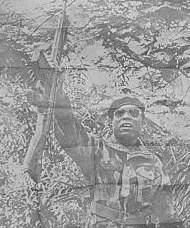
Nathaniel Mbumba, leader of the FLNC, on a 1978 propaganda poster.

The FLNC originated as the Katangese Gendarmerie, the military of the secessionist State of Katanga during the Congo Crisis. After the defeat of the Katanga secessionists, many of the black Katanga troops were forced into exile in Portuguese Angola in the mid-1960s. Led by Nathaniel Mbumba, they fought for the Portuguese colonial power during the Angolan War of Independence and eventually formed the FLNC in 1967. After the defeat of the Portuguese in 1974, they joined the victorious MPLA.

The FLNC did not have any political program other than ending Mobutu's grip on Zaire. FLNC troops were said to have been trained by Cuban advisers; Western authorities believed that the rebel forces were "manipulated by the Soviets" and assisted by officers from Cuba and East Germany. However, more recent research has shown that the Katangan rebels "had few connections with the Cuban army or advisors stationed in Angola", and archival documents suggest that Zairian authorities deliberately exaggerated the threat of Soviet influence to ensure French aid.

== Shaba I ==
The FLNC, numbering about 1,500 people, invaded Shaba (the new Zairean name for Katanga) from eastern Angola on 7 March 1977. Seeking to overthrow Mobutu, the FLNC quickly captured Kolwezi, Kasaji, and Mutshatsha. Mobutu appealed to William Eteki of Cameroon, Chairman of the Organization of African Unity, for assistance on 2 April. The French government airlifted 1,500 Moroccan troops into Kinshasa on 10 April. The French reinforcements worked in conjunction with the Zairian Armed Forces to beat back the FLNC with air cover from Egyptian pilots flying French-built FAZ Dassault Mirage 5 fighter jets. The Egyptian-Moroccan force pushed the last of the militants, along with several refugees, into Angola and Zambia by April.

== Shaba II ==
During the Shaba II intervention, 4,000 rebels took the city of Kolwezi. Mbumba reportedly lost control of his troops, and they began executing European and Zairean civilians. Most of the regulars soon retreated. The irregulars were driven back into Angola after the French Foreign Legion intervention during the Battle of Kolwezi.

== Later actions ==
Mbumba was expelled from the party in 1987. In 1990, Mobutu began a process to restore multipartyism. The FLNC was legalized in 1991 and its members came back to Zaire. During the First Congo War, the FLNC fought on the side of the Zairian army due to shared opposition to the presence of Rwandan troops in Zaire, but subsequently became favourable to the AFDL rebels led by Laurent-Désiré Kabila. The FLNC joined the opposition under Joseph Kabila's presidency.

== See also ==
- Second Congo War
- Progressive Congolese Students
