= Hamidou Laanigri =

Moroccan general (1939–2023)

Hamidou Laanigri حميدو لعنيݣري
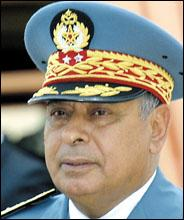

General Inspector of the Auxiliary Forces
- In office 2006 – 10 September 2023

Director of the DST
- In office September 1999 – June 2003
- Preceded by: Driss Basri
- Succeeded by: Ahmed Harari

Director of the DGSN Direction Générale de Sûreté Nationale
- In office July 2003 – September 2006
- Preceded by: Hafid Benhachem
- Succeeded by: Charki Draiss

Personal details
- Born: 1939 Meknes, French Morocco
- Died: 10 September 2023 (aged 84)

Military service
- Allegiance: Morocco
- Branch/service: Royal Gendarmerie
- Years of service: 1959–2023
- Rank: General
- Commands: Commander-in-Chief of the Auxiliary Forces
- Battles/wars: Shaba I

Hamidou Laanigri (1939 – 10 September 2023) was a Moroccan general who served as head of the intelligence service of the Moroccan Ministry of the Interior. Laanigri was often accused of acts of torture in relation to the detention of Islamist activists after the 2003 Casablanca bombings and in connection with the secret Temara interrogation centre.

== Early life ==
Hamidou Laanigri was born in Meknes, Morocco in 1939. In 1956 Laanigri started his career in the military as a corporal working with general Driss Benomar—who is also from Meknes. Benomar sent Laanigri first to the military training school of Ahermoumou and then to the Officers School of Dar al-Bayda (Officers academy of Meknes), graduating with the rank of second lieutenant (sous-lieutenant). He was deployed in Zag in 1960 and for a few months in Agadir. In 1962 he joined the Royal Moroccan Gendarmerie a year later and was posted to Tangiers and then Kenitra.

== Gendarmerie career ==
In 1977 while a colonel at the Gendarmerie he headed the military unit that was deployed to Zaire to help Mobutu quell the Shaba I rebellion. In 1979 he was sent to the United Arab Emirates as a security instructor, returning to Morocco only in 1989.

== Under Mohammed VI ==
In September 1999 he was promoted by Mohammed VI to head the DST (Direction de Surveillance du Territoire) as a replacement for Driss Basri. He was recommended by General Kadiri because he hated Islamists.

In September 2006 he left the DST and was appointed the General Inspector of the Auxiliary Forces. In late 2012 it was rumoured that he had retired, however in January 2014 he was reported as being the head of this paramilitary unit.

Laanigri was the instigator of the Groupes urbains de sécurité (nickname Croatia) which were disbanded after he left the police directorate.

In September 2011, Laanigri survived a road accident.

== Death ==
Hamidou Laanigri died on 10 September 2023, at the age of 84.

== See also ==
- Housni Benslimane
- Abdelaziz Bennani
