= Al-Ghumari =

Al-Ghumari (Arabic: الغماري), is a surname. Notable people with the surname include:

- Abd al-Aziz al-Ghumari (1920–1997), Moroccan scholar
- Abdullah al-Ghumari (1910–1993), Moroccan preacher

== See also ==
- Hammam Sidi Belhassan al-Ghoumari, a bath in Tlemcen, Algeria
