= 2003 Casablanca bombings =

Series of suicide bombings by Salafia Jihadia militants

- Part of the Insurgency in the Maghreb (2002–present)
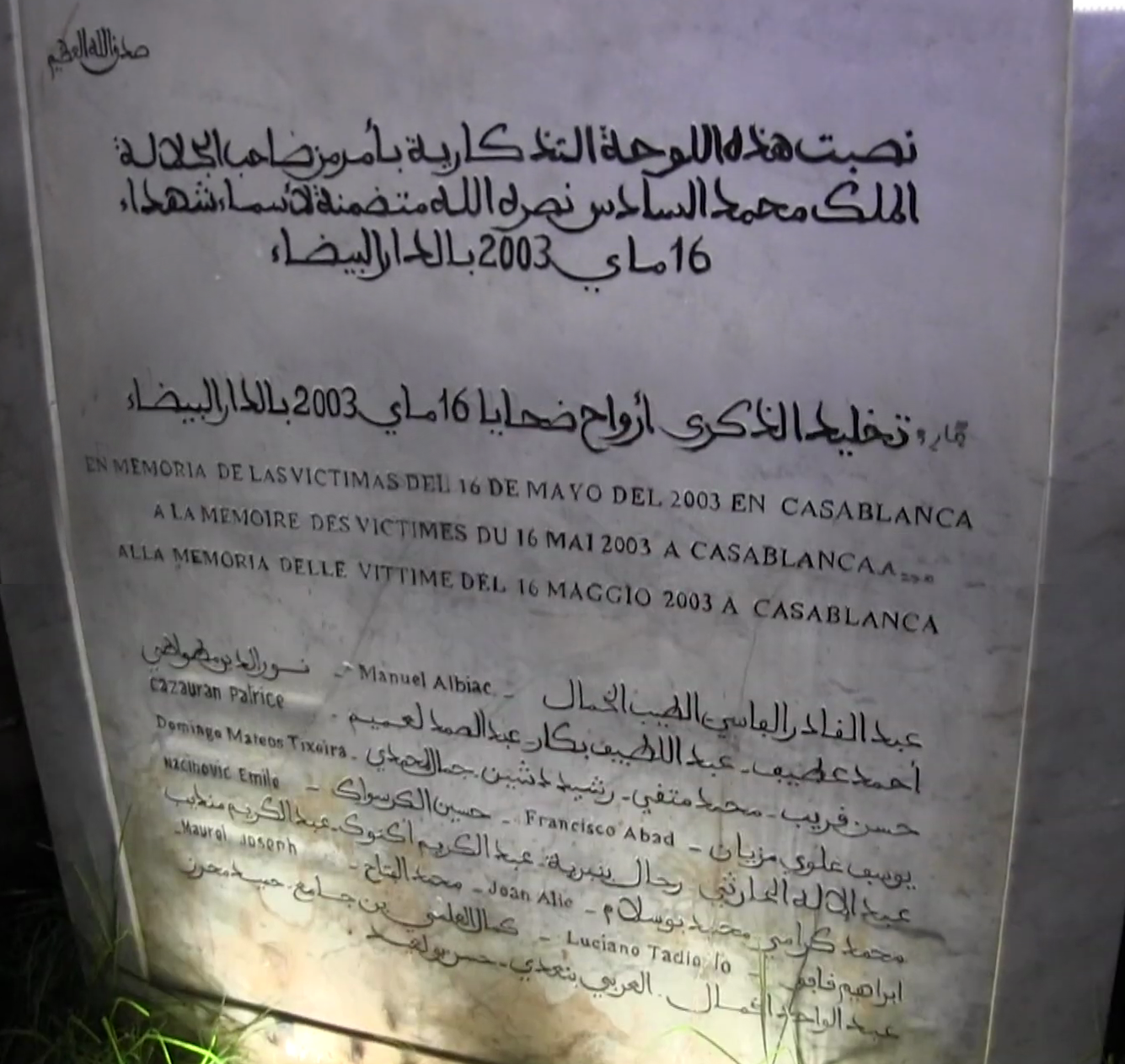
- Commemorative stele at Mohammed V Square
- Locations of the attacks—points denote suicide bombings
- Location: Casablanca, Morocco
- Date: 16 May 2003; 23 years ago 21:45 – 22:15 (UTC+1)
- Target: Moroccan Jews and European tourists, particularly: 1. Casa de España; 2. Positano; 3. Jewish Alliance; 4. Hotel Farah; 5. Jewish Cemetery
- Attack type: Suicide attack
- Weapon: Propane bombs in backpacks
- Deaths: 45 (including 12 attackers)
- Injuries: ≈ 100
- Perpetrator: Salafia Jihadia
- No. of participants: 15
- Defender: Mostafa Tahiri
- Motive: Islamic extremism, antisemitism, anti-Western sentiment
- Accused: 2,112 indicted
- Verdict: 13 sentenced to death
- Convicted: 906 convicted (4 in France)
- Litigation: Arrest warrants issued for 50 Moroccans and 12 foreign citizens

The 2003 Casablanca bombings, commonly known as May 16 (Arabic: 16 ماي, French: 16 mai), were a series of coordinated suicide bombings on May 16, 2003, in Casablanca, Morocco. Twelve suicide bombers loyal to the Salafia Jihadia organization detonated bombs hidden in backpacks in the Casa de España restaurant, the Hotel Farah, the Jewish Alliance of Casablanca, and sites near the Belgian consulate and an old Jewish cemetery. The attacks, which were later claimed by al-Qaeda, were the deadliest terrorist attacks in Morocco's history, claiming the lives of forty-five people (33 victims and 12 suicide bombers) and injuring at least 100. Despite deliberately targeting Jews, none of the victims were Jews as the attack occurred during Shabbat.

Out of the initial commando of fifteen, three abandoned their plans on the spot and were later arrested. The attacks came in a rise in radical preachers critical of the Moroccan government, which they had viewed as infidels; many of the preachers were veterans of the Soviet-Afghan war.

The interrogation of the surviving suicide bombers led to the terrorist cell's ringleader, Abdelhak Bentassir, who had demanded that members of the cell make an oath of allegiance towards him after following a radical preacher. Bentassir later died in police custody in unclear circumstances. Authorities led a judicial purge of Islamists in the country, with indictments filed against 2,112 extremists leading to 903 convictions and 12 death sentences.

In the immediate aftermath of the attacks, a tough counter-terrorism bill was signed which was compared to the Patriot Act. The attacks shined light on the state of shanty towns in the country, with a government initiative fighting against slums being announced the following year. The slums of Sidi Moumen were fully demolished after a series of attacks in 2007.

== Background and planning ==
=== Radical Islam in Morocco ===
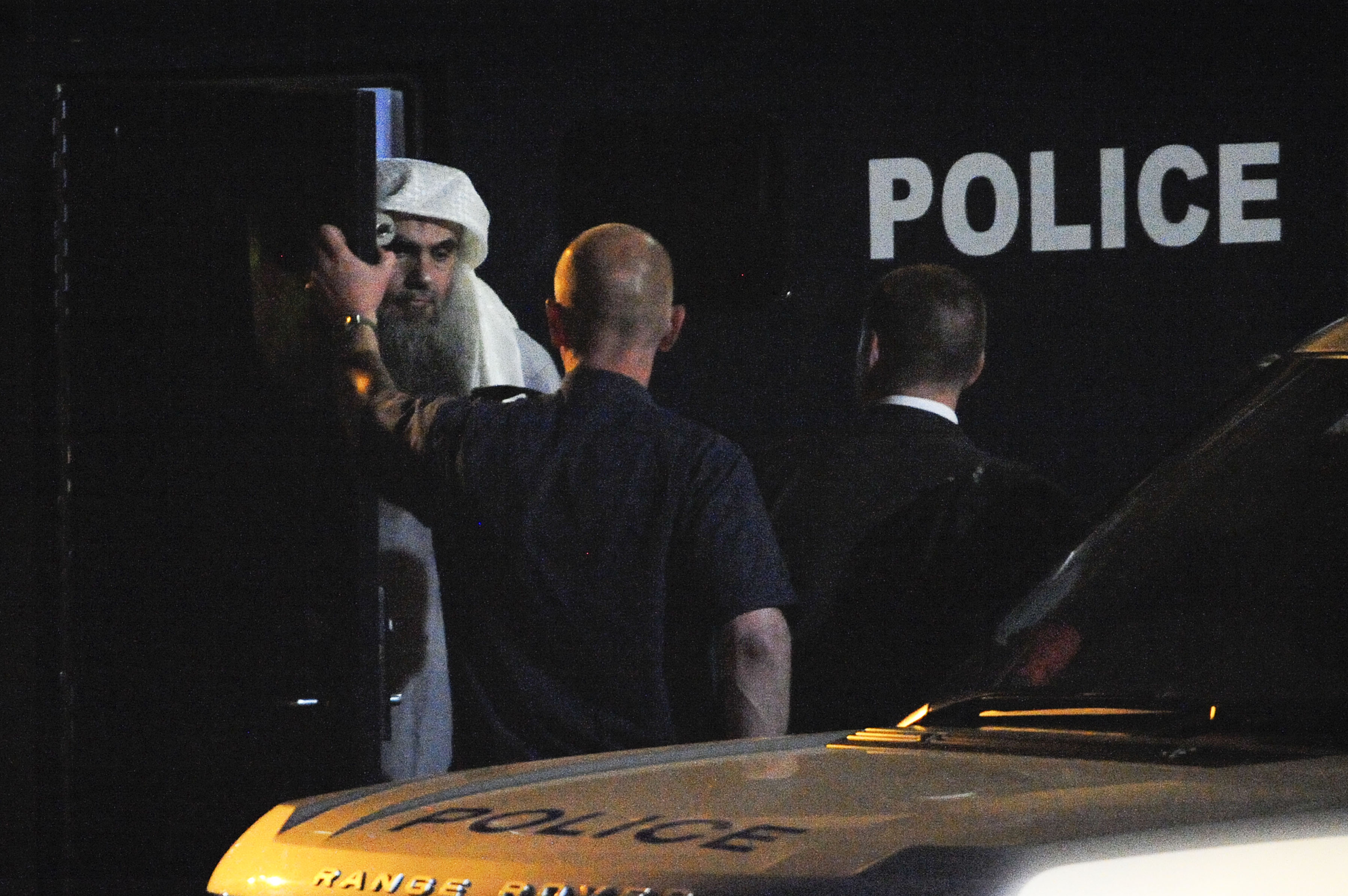
Al-Qaeda ideologue Abu Qatada, pictured during his 2013 deportation from the United Kingdom, was reportedly involved in the creation of the GICM.

Throughout modern Moroccan history, radical Islamist violence has been relatively unprecedented. There have been rare exceptions such as the 1975 assassination of Omar Benjelloun by loyalists to Islamist guru Abdelkrim Motiî. Despite this, radical Islamists were largely forced to be peaceful following the assassination due to crackdowns on groups such as Shabiba Islamiya under King Hassan II's Years of Lead.

The Soviet-Afghan war provided an opportunity for radical Islamists in Morocco to participate in what they perceived as holy war, with seventy Moroccans having fought for the Afghan Mujahideen according to the Directorate for Territorial Surveillance (DST). This included future members of Salafia Jihadia.

In 1996 and amidst the Algerian civil war, Osama bin Laden tasked Ibn al-Shaykh al-Libi to create a federation of jihadist movements loyal to al-Qaeda in the Maghreb which culminated in the Libyan Islamic Fighting Group (LIFG). The group's founding members were al-Libi's lieutenants, which mainly consisted of Moroccan diaspora such as Mohammed El Guerbouzi in the United Kingdom.

In a bid to expand to Morocco, the LIFG created the Moroccan Islamic Movement (HASM) and published two issues of a fanzine titled Sada al-Maghrib (lit. 'echo of Morocco') which was distributed in Denmark, Italy, and Belgium. In 1997, the HASM turned into Moroccan Islamic Combatant Group (GICM) and published nine press releases in al-Ansar, the media branch of the Armed Islamic Group of Algeria (GIA). A year later, al-Libi sent a Libyan representative to Morocco to see if Moroccan society was "ready".

In 1994, four French citizens loyal to Shabiba Islamiya attacked the Atlas-Asni hotel in Marrakesh, killing two Spanish tourists. Moroccan authorities blamed the attacks on the Algerian Department of Intelligence and Security (DRS), leading to Morocco closing its borders with Algeria. The mastermind of the attacks, Abdellilah Ziyad, had been living in France illegally at the time, and was sentenced to eight years in prison for his role by a French court in 1997. In 2021, Ziyad was deported by France in 2021 to face charges in Morocco.

In early 2001, after the representative's departure, Osama bin Laden ordered al-Libi to transfer all remaining high-ranking Moroccan members of the LIFG to the GICM as the GICM was al-Qaeda's official relay in Morocco. A training camp for the GICM was opened in Bagram as well as a guest house for GICM members in Kabul ran by Saâd Houssaïni. Following the Battle of Tora Bora in the immediate aftermath of September 11 attacks, most members of the GICM in Afghanistan returned to Morocco, including future radical preachers who would have an ideological impact on the Casablanca attackers. Members of the GICM who had returned from Afghanistan were dubbed as "the Afghans" by the DST.

In May 2002, the DST arrested three Saudi members of al-Qaeda, Zouhair Hilal Mohamed al-Tubaiti, Hilal Jaber Awad al-Assiri, and Abdullah Musafer Ali al-Ghamdi. They had planned to attack ships belonging to the British Naval in the strait of Gibraltar and had been in contact with Abd al-Rahim al-Nashiri, the mastermind of the USS Cole bombing. They were sentenced to ten years in prison in February 2003.

=== Salafia Jihadia and as-Sirat al-Mustaqim ===
The exodus of Moroccan veterans from Afghanistan led to a wave of radical preachers in the country, who mainly gave classes regarding jihad and wrote books about the supposed "godless" nature of the Moroccan state and how fighting would be lawful under Islamic law. In some cases, the preachers made small booklets for followers with a primary level of education. Some followers, inspired by these classes, declared themselves "emirs" and garnered a small following willing to pledge allegiance to them.

One of the only preachers who had also proclaimed themselves as a "spiritual guide" was Zakaria Miloudi, who led a subsect of Takfir wal-Hijra named as-Sirat al-Mustaqim (lit. 'the straight path'). In February 2002, drug dealer Fouad Kerdoudi was stoned to death in Sidi Moumen by as-Sirat al-Mustaqim after Miloudi issued a fatwa advocating for his murder. Miloudi was arrested a month later and sentenced to a year in prison. During a police raid, documents were found showing that Miloudi was planning to set up urban guerrilla centers in Casablanca modeled after the focos.

In the late 1990s, a follower of a radical preacher named Youssef Fikri, known in the media as "the emir of blood", proclaimed himself as an "emir" and started an offshoot of as-Sirat al-Mustaqim. Fikri's group, known as Jamaât as-Sirat al-Mustaqim (lit. 'party of the straight path'), were named by the authorities under the umbrella title of Salafia Jihadia. Fikri, alongside around thirty co-conspirators, oversaw a killing spree of six murders and 154 assaults throughout the country, mainly against prostitutes. Fikri's second-in-command, Mohamed Damir, was a prominent figure in the neighborhood and was seen as a social leader.

Salafia Jihadia also perpetrated carjackings and robberies, robbing an electric utility office in 2001 as well as burglaries of villas in Ain Diab. Fikri justified his crime spree as a "moral campaign where debauchery and prostitution were flourishing" and that his actions were initially "carried out peacefully with success", he claimed that he only began his crime spree once his "actions were so successful that the police started hunting us down".

In 1997, Fikri's Salafia Jihadia group murdered a Moroccan Jew in Casablanca. In October 1998, Fikri murdered his uncle, Abdelaziz Fikri, in Youssoufia for having allegedly cheated on his wife. Fikri continued assaulting civilians in Casablanca. In 1999, Fikri was informed of a homosexual in Youssoufia who was entertaining a relationship with an employee of the OCP. Fikri and three members of the group visited the alleged homosexual's apartment where they encountered Omar Ferrag in a bath robe, and stabbed him to death. After his arrest, Fikri claimed that Ferrag was killed as he was a "prominent homosexual" and that the group were forced to murder him because he "could not be reasoned with".

In 1999, two members of Salafia Jihadia and friends of Fikri murdered their roommate, identified by authorities with his first name of Mohamed, in Nador. Fikri was reportedly motivated by Mohamed's "Marxist tendencies" and his alleged blasphemy. On September 10, 2001, three members of Salafia Jihadia encountered notary Abdelaziz Assadi alongside three women in Nador. The group pretended to be policemen before Assadi pretended to be the King's prosecutor, upon learning of this, they held Assadi and the three women hostage before murdering Assadi and dumping his body in a well.

Fikri was arrested in Nador in January 2002. He admitted to all six murders as well as the assaults, and his confessions led to arrest warrants being issued against five Moroccans who had fought in Afghanistan. In October 2002, an arrest warrant was served against Mohamed Damir in Hay Mohammadi when Rabiî Aït Ouzzou, Damir's brother-in-law, plunged a sword in a police officer before being shot nine times and dying of his injuries. Damir was shot eight times during his arrest and survived. Upon learning of Fikri's cell, then-Director of Territorial Surveillance Hamidou Laânigri reportedly declared that "Salafia Jihadia is our GIA".

=== Planning ===
According to the authorities, the suicide bombers were loyal to a group named Salafia Jihadia. All of the suicide bombers came from the slums of Sidi Moumen, including the first suicide bomber to be radicalized, 24-year-old night guard Mohamed Omari. He was a member of the largely pacifist and apolitical Tablighi Jamaat movement. In 1996, Omari met radical preacher Zakaria Miloudi and joined as-Sirat al-Mustaqim after attending his lectures. Miloudi held lectures where he notably called every Moroccan with a birth certificate or identity card apostates. Miloudi once described Parliament as a "gathering of apostates and atheists". Miloudi and Omari later had a falling out after Omari embezzled funds collected for the construction of a mosque.

Omari frequented local mosques in Sidi Moumen, with footage of Osama bin Laden and Palestinian suicide bombers regularly shown on Al Jazeera appealing to the slum's youth. It was in those mosques that Omari met many of the future suicide bombers, forming a terror cell that included Yassine Lahnech. Lachnech set up a network of 96 suicide bombers to carry out attacks for a 'sequel' of May 16 in Tangier (described in his notes as "the Mecca of druglords"), Essaouira ("the capital of Jews"), Marrakesh ("modern Sodom and Gomorrah"), Agadir ("the den of degenerates from the Gulf").

The terror cell held regular meetings at Sidi Moumen, where they held collective prayers, listened to cassettes and watched videos of the Second Chechen War and calls for jihad. These meetings were held at the homes of 21-year-old Mahjoub Grimet and 28-year-old Abdelfattah Boulikdane. Boulikdane proclaimed himself as the cell's spiritual leader, leading prayer and supplying the group with books. According to an indictment, 25-year-old Hassan Taoussi attacked people and robbed them of their money to finance the aspiring terror cell.

In March 2003, Boulikdane met 30-year-old shoemaker Abdelhak Bentassir, known as "Moul Sebbat" (lit. 'the shoe man'), at a market in Hay Mohammadi. Boulikdane was captivated by Bentassir's radicalism, praising him to the group as a "true mujahideen" and admiring him as he made "a good living" being a shoemaker in Fez, unlike the rest of the largely-unemployed group. Bentassir later became the leader of the terror cell, proclaiming himself as the "national emir" and organized a ceremony where six suicide bombers sat cross-legged around him and pledged allegiance by proclaiming "to swear allegiance to [Bentassir] for death on God's path". At the end of the ceremony, Bentassir ordered the group to find other volunteers in the mosques of Sidi Moumen to pledge allegiance to him.

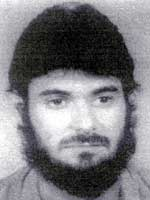
Karim El Mejjati, who is believed with Houssaïni to have given bomb-making instructions to Bentassir. An arrest warrant was issued against him before being shot to death by Saudi authorities during a 2005 raid.

Investigators believe that Bentassir was "the only link" between the masterminds of Salafia Jihadia and the suicide bombers. He regularly visited future terrorists and gave them lessons in terrorism. Boulikdane sent two aspiring suicide bombers, 22-year-old Adil Taïa and 27-year-old Mohamed M'hanni, to find bomb-making instructions in a cybercafé. The text, in English, couldn't be understood by the group who gave it to Bentassir. Bentassir consulted "higher-ups" regarding the document, believed by investigators to be Saâd Houssaïni and GICM founder Karim El Mejjati, both were veteran bomb-makers during the War in Afghanistan. Another member of the cell, 22-year-old Mohamed Hassouna was also tasked with downloading bomb-making instructions from the Internet and translated them to Arabic from English.

Houssaïni is believed to have given a detailed instruction manual to Bentassir, who gave it to Boulikdane. Boulikdane was in charge of making the explosives with Omari, with Boulikdane obtaining gunpowder while Omari provided lab equipment. The manual given to Bentassir lacks information on making a long-distance fuze, despite El Mejjati and Houssaïni knowing how to detonate a charge remotely. Investigators theorize that this was purposefully omitted by El Mejjati and Houssaïni, who "wanted a kamikaze operation, spectacular and absolutely horrific to mark the spirit".

In the summer of 2001, the group carried a bomb test in a landfill in Hay Attacharouk. The bomb, attached to a long-distance fuze, did not explode. The group carried a successful attempt to detonate another bomb in the Sidi Moumen cemetery in December 2002, with Boulikdane and Omari reportedly jumping in joy upon seeing the blast. This occurred as last suicide bomber was recruited, 28-year-old kung-fu instructor and welder Rachid Jalil. He was radicalized by preacher Abderrazak Rtioui, a member of as-Sirat al-Mustaqim in a nearby slum. Jalil took a pledge of allegiance to Bentassir and trained the group in martial arts every summer in the forest of Oued Mellah.

In March 2003, Bentassir gave the group 18,000 dirham to source bomb-making materials including oxygen, acetone and nails. He chose the targets and planned for the attack to occur at 10 p.m. on May 9. Hassan Taoussi was charged with properly weighing the bomb-making chemicals. A member of the terror cell, 32-year-old Saïd Abid, scouted the target locations and recognized a "drunken bastard who had swindled his older brother" at the Casa de España. Eager to get revenge, Abid told Boulikdane who immediately suspended the terrorist plot, telling Abid that the "whiff of vengeance emptied the operation of its dimension of jihad". Informed of the setback, Bentassir postponed the plot for a week, taking place on the 16th.

On May 14, the group settled at Omari's house with M'hanni preparing the homemade explosives. During their stay, the future suicide bombers underwent what authorities described as "psychological conditioning" through watching lectures and propaganda films with themes including "the last voyage", "the followers of the Supreme Sacrifice", and "Heaven or Hell".

On May 16, 2003, at 4 a.m., seven members the terror cell were awoken by Boulikdane in Omari's house for Fajr prayer, they recited verses of the Quran until Zuhr prayer in the afternoon where the rest of the cell grouped together. Omari, in a bid to seem inconspicuous, prayed in a local mosque and bought medicinal herbs to soothe a stomach ache Boulikdane had been suffering from as well as dates, milk, and sandwiches for the group. In the afternoon, the group watched Russian Hell, a film produced by Ibn al-Khattab during the Second Chechen War.

After Maghrib prayer, the group shaved away their beards and were given bags by M'hanni containing a propane bomb made with a gas cylinder set to detonate five seconds after ignition, they had put on Casio F-91Ws with timers set to 10 p.m. and swapped their qamis for new jeans. Boulikdane gave the group hunting knives in the case that anyone interrupts their plans. Abid scouted the locations once more and came back at 8 p.m. with positive results. the group received a call from Bentassir giving them his blessings. The group all congratulated each other one last time, repeating "see you in paradise". The suicide bombers left in small groups to avoid being noticed. The attack occurred on the 47th anniversary of Morocco's national police force, two days after Aid al-Mawlid, and a week after the birth of Crown Prince Moulay Hassan.

=== Profile of the suicide bombers ===
French political scientist Gilles Kepel described the attacks as a "poor man's September 11", manifesting al-Qaeda's "lesser professionalism" with killing Muslims. The twelve suicide bombers were all from the Sidi Moumen slums, including nine from the Carrière Thomas district, with an average age of 25, and many had never pursued higher education. They were recruited through a friend, colleague or family member and were low-paid laborers or unemployed.

== Bombings ==
=== Attacks ===
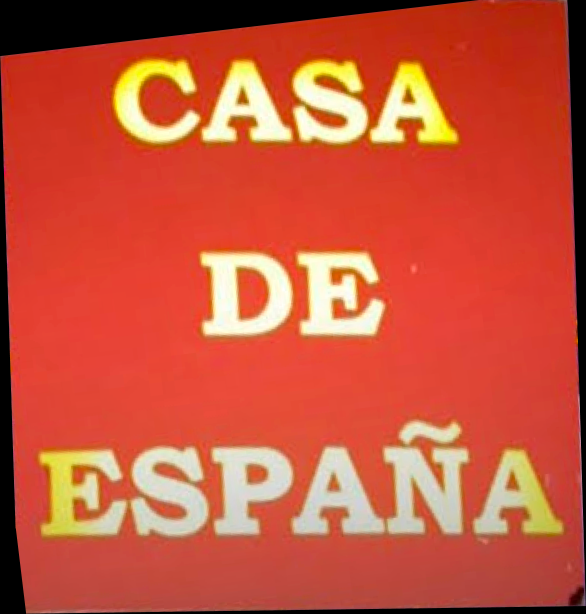
The suicide bombers targeted the Casa de España restaurant (sign pictured), where twenty-two people died.

On May 16, 2003 at 8:45 p.m., the Casa de España restaurant was targeted by four suicide bombers during a bingo session organized at the restaurants. A security guard attempted to stop the group before one of the suicide bombers pulled out a knife and slit the guard's throat. Once inside the restaurant, the attackers yelled "Allah Akbar" three times while one of the suicide bombers threw a hand-made grenade under a table. Two of the suicide bombers positioned themselves about fifteen meters from one another and simultaneously triggered their bombs. A witness claimed that the suicide bombers were also wearing explosive vests in addition to the bombs in their backpacks.

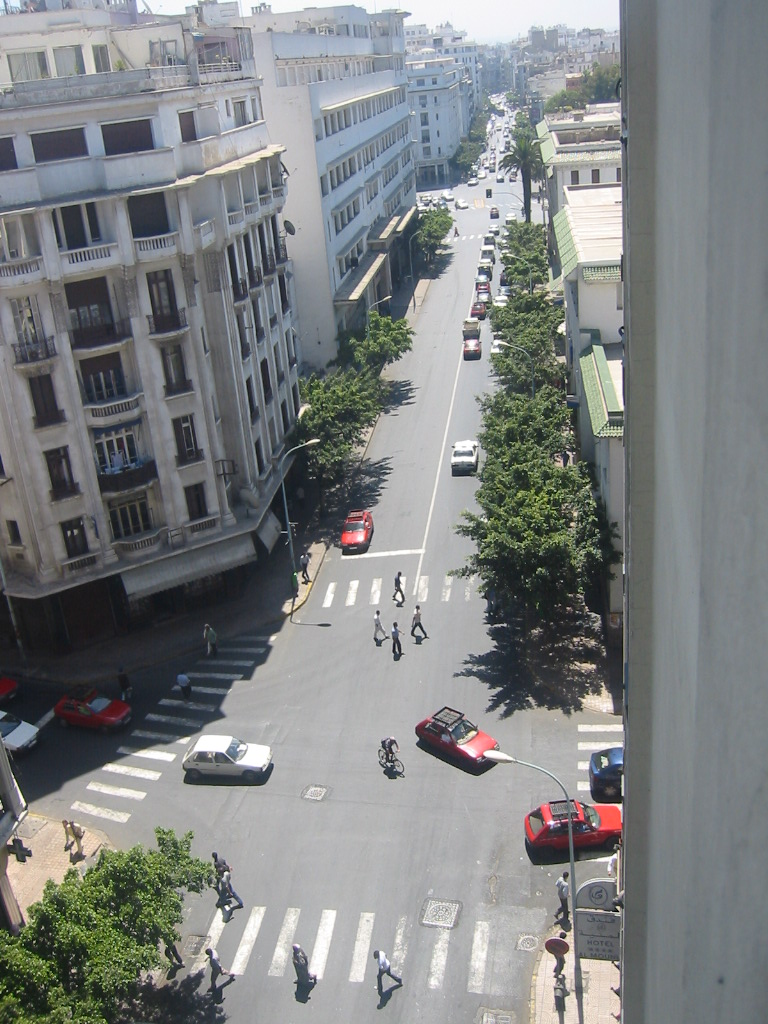
Boulevard de Paris, where most of the bombings occurred, pictured in 2005

The suicide bombers at Casa de España were 32-year-old Youssef Kaoutari, 27-year-old Mohamed Laâroussi, and 32-year-old Saïd Abid. Another suicide bomber, 22-year old Mohamed El Arbaoui sprinted away from the scene before blowing himself up while being tackled by police officers. The attack on Casa de España killed 22 people, including four Spanish citizens, four French citizens, and an Italian. The head of one of the suicide bombers, Mohamed Hassouna, was found 40 meters away from the restaurant.

Following the attacks at Casa de España, 22-year-old Khaled Taib, 28-year-old Rachid Jalil, and 22-year-old Mohamed Hassouna entered the Positano, a Jewish-owned Italian restaurant, the group were stopped by a night guard and two police officers. Hassouna and Kaoutari blew themselves up in front of the restaurant, killing two police officers and the night guard. No deaths were reported inside the restaurant as the blasts was absorbed by a Mercedes 4WD parked outside the restaurant, the Belgian consulate in front of the restaurant suffered from structural damage from the detonations.

The Jewish Alliance of Casablanca was also attacked by 27-year-old Mohamed M'hanni, who blew himself up outside of the Alliance's front door, and 23-year-old Khalid Benmoussa, who ran inside of the Alliance and blew himself up in its main hall. The attack killed nobody except for the suicide bombers as the building was closed and empty during Shabbat. The building was scheduled to have been packed the next morning for an event scheduled in the Alliance.

At 8:50 p.m., the five-star Hotel Farah was attacked by 24-year-old Mohamed Omari and 28-year-old Abdelfattah Boulikdane, the "spiritual leader" of the terror cell. The group were turned away by a member of security before Omari stabbed the guard and was tackled by another security guard. Boulikdane rushed his way into the hotel's bar before detonating his vest, killing the security guard, 44-year-old Hassan Karib, and a porter, 48-year-old Ahmed Atef. A hotel employee was blinded while another suffered three-degree burns to his face and thighs.

Mohamed Omari attempted to throw a homemade grenade before being knocked unconscious by the blast. Omari was barely able to get up and attempted to run before being tackled by other hotel employees as well as taxi driver Mostafa Tahiri. He was arrested while attempting to get rid of the bomb in his backpack. Omari claimed to have abandoned his plans after "noticing that there were no Jews inside of the hotel", something that he would have not been able to distinguish. Investigators suggested that Omari had already discarded his bomb and was about to escape before getting injured by the blast.

25-year-old Hassan Taoussi was also projected to attack the Hotel Farah, but abandoned the rest of the terror group while they were walking to their the hotel. Taoussi went to a nearby avenue and took a taxi to a landfill in Hay Attacharouk, where he dumped the backpack containing the bomb. Taoussi took a bus to Oujda and failed to cross the Algeria–Morocco border, he later hid at a family member's home in Berrechid where he was arrested nine days later.

22-year-old Abderrahim Belcaïd reached a fountain 150 yards (140 m) away from a Jewish cemetery that had been abandoned since 1950. He asked three teenage bystanders who were smoking for a light before leaning against a wall and detonating his suicide vest, killing the bystanders. It is speculated that Belcaïd was unable to find neither the alliance or the cemetery.

He was accompanied by 28-year-old Rachid Jalil, who dropped his backpack with a bomb between two cars and walked away. Jalil was told by police officers that Belcaïd turned into a panic after realizing that he had abandoned from the plot, with Belcaïd detonating his bomb while two people were attempting to take his backpack away.

The attacks were over by 9:15 p.m., 34 civilians were killed including 2 police officers, along with 11 suicide bombers.

=== Victims ===
Deaths by nationality
Country	Number
Morocco	25
Spain	4
France	4
Italy	1

More than 100 people were injured, 14 of which with life-threatening injuries; at least 97 of injured were Muslims. Nine of the dead were Europeans while the rest were Moroccan, one of the victims was a French-Moroccan. Despite the terrorists mainly intending to target Jews, none of the victims were Jewish as the attack occurred during Shabbat.

Among the victims was former Raja AC footballer Abdellatif Beggar, who was with friends at the Casa de España restaurant. Raja AC gave an apartment in Casablanca to Beggar's family following his death. Raja AC's historical rival in the Casablanca derby, the Wydad AC, offered 10 percent of the profits from their following football match. Lawyer Abdelouahed El Khammal and his son, Taïb, died in the attacks. El Khammal's widow, Soad Begdouri El Khammal, founded the Moroccan Association for Victims of Terrorism (AMVT) in 2011.

== Investigation and trials ==
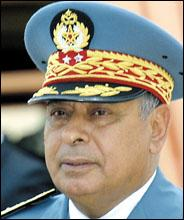
General Hamidou Laânigri, then-Director of Territorial Surveillance, led the investigation into the attacks

The investigation into the attacks was led by the General Directorate for National Security's National Judicial Police Brigade (BNPJ), the Royal Gendarmerie, and the Directorate for Territorial Surveillance (DST) under the leadership of Hamidou Laânigri. The attacks led to a vast investigation being carried out into radical Islamist circles. In the investigation into the attacks, more than 5,200 suspects were arrested and authorities questioned around 11,000 people.

Immediately after the attacks, authorities arrested surviving suicide bomber Mohamed Omari at the scene after he was injured by another suicide bomber's blast before being tackled by hotel staff and bystanders. He was sent to the CHU Ibn Rochd hospital and was interrogated by the BNPJ where he confessed to his role in the attacks. None of the suicide bombers had criminal records and were known to security services other than Omari for his links with Miloudi.

Police were assisted by French and American counterterrorism experts, French intelligence chief Pierre Brochand and Spanish intelligence chief Jorge Dezcallar de Mazarredo alongside officials from the FBI and the CIA met with Moroccan authorities the day after the attacks.

Omari's confession led to the arrest of failed suicide bomber Rachid Jalil on May 18 at the Oued Mellah forest range, where he "reminisced of Afghanistan". Jalil also confessed to his role in the attacks. Authorities had arrested forty people in connection with the attacks. On May 25, surviving suicide bomber Hassan Taoussi was arrested in Berrechid. A week after the attacks, Adil Charkaoui, a Moroccan-Canadian imam, was arrested in Montreal before being released. An arrest warrant had been issued by Moroccan authorities for Cherkaoui in connection with the Casablanca attacks, which he denied.

Investigators determined that the terror cell was part of Salafia Jihadia organization, a term used by Moroccan government to refer to the Moroccan Islamic Combatant Group (GICM), an al-Qaeda allied group. The attack was reportedly ordered by Abu Musab al-Zarqawi, who financed the terror cell with $50,000 to $70,000 under the umbrella of Jama'at al-Tawhid wal-Jihad. Saad bin Laden was suspected of direct involvement in the bombings despite being under house arrest in Iran. On June 21, al-Qaeda officially claimed responsibility for the Casablanca and Riyadh attacks through a video.

Forty-five bodies, including nine from the Aïn Chock communal morgue, were taken to the CHU Ibn Rochd hospital for identification and autopsy. The task was entrusted to nine members of the hospital's Forensic Medicine Institute, who were under time pressure, as Islamic custom requires burial at sunrise the day after death. Twenty-four of the bodies were identified by May 17, with a crisis cell being set-up within the Institute for families.

The BNPJ wrote identification reports for each body held at the hospital while communal officials issued burial permits on the spot upon identification, the Institute mobilized an imam to perform ritual ablution on the deceased. Five more bodies were identified by next Sunday.

Twelve bodies were unclaimed at the institute, assumed to be the suicide bombers. Described as "shredded", only the head and a few limbs remained. In two cases, their skull were pulverized by the blast. The Gendarmerie and the BNPJ identified seven suicide bombers with fingerprint records. Five other terrorists were identified through DNA testing.

The confessions of the three surviving suicide bombers led to the cell's emir, Abdelhak Bentassir. Bentassir was arrested in Fez ten days after the attack, on May 26. According to authorities, Bentassir suffered from "a liver four kilos thick" the day of his arrest and died of "heart and liver failure" while being transferred to the CHU Ibn Sina hospital in Rabat, with an autopsy confirming he died of natural causes. Investigators told The Washington Post that Bentassir died of heart and liver failure after three days of near non-stop interrogation. Bentassir's family claims that he was healthy and was detained on May 21, five days before the announcement of his arrest. His widow, Amina Mourabiti, claimed in 2013 that authorities refused to issue a death certificate for Bentassir.

A day after Bentassir's death, King Mohammed VI broke his silence about the attacks and delivered a speech warning that those who "hurt the security of the state" would suffer "stiff consequences", declaring that the "era of lax management" was over.

Some of the detainees were reportedly taken to Temara interrogation centre, where they claim to have been tortured through beatings with a stick, slaps on the face, shackling, verbal intimidation and humiliation, electric shocks, as well as sleep deprivation. Others were reportedly forced to sign a confession before being sentenced. Regarding accusations of torture, Moroccan justice minister Mohammed Bouzoubaa stated that he "can't say that there were absolutely no lapses in judgement, but what I do deny is that they were widespread".

Two days after the attack, seven suspects (including Saâd Houssaïni and Karim El Mejjati) were put on a government wanted list published by Maghreb Arabe-Presse, Morocco's official news agency.

On June 4, 2003, French citizen Richard Antoine Pierre Robert, who was in the wanted list and was known in the press as the "blue-eyed emir", was arrested. Richard Robert admitted in an interview to have participated in a plot to establish an Islamic state in the Rif mountains of Northern Morocco. Robert built a mosque with radical preacher Mohamed Fizazi with money obtained from drug trafficking.

In July 2003, four members of Salafia Jihadia kidnapped and stabbed gendarme Mohamed Hamdi to death in Sidi Bernoussi. On September 11, 2003, Moroccan Jew Albert Rebibo was shot to death in Casablanca by Taoufik El Hanouichi, who had been on the wanted list in connection with the attacks. He was arrested by the GIGR in January 2004 after being shot in the leg.

On May 1, 2004, Abdelmalek Bouzgarne was arrested alongside two suspects during a raid in Hay Hassani. The three suspects had rushed towards the police with machetes while screaming "For Martyrdom!" prior to being shot in the legs and tackled by police officers. He was a loyalist of Youssef Fikri and a member of Salafia Jihadia who had been on the wanted list in connection with the attacks. Authorities found evidence of murders dating from the late 1990s in Bouzargane's hideout.

In December 2004, GICM member Hassan El Haski, who was facing charges in Spain for the 2004 Madrid bombings, was questioned over his links to the Casablanca bombings and was suspected to have helped plan them. On March 19, 2004, Belgian police arrested a suspect wanted by the Moroccan government in connection with the bombings.

On March 7, 2007, bomb-maker Saâd Houssaïni, who was also on the list, was arrested by the GIGR in a cybercafé near Sidi Maârouf after the DST tracked a GSM packet for a phone number belonging to Houssaini to the cybercafé.

=== Trials ===
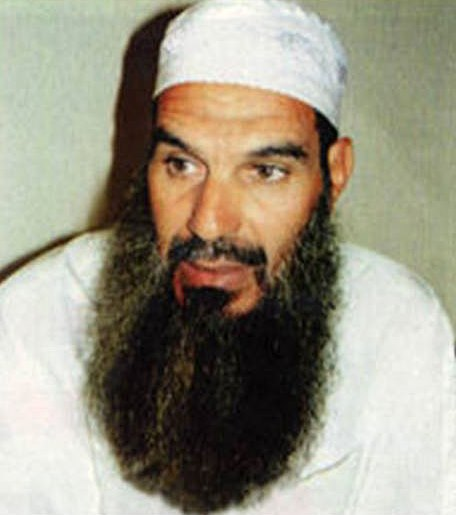
Radical preacher Mohamed Fizazi was sentenced to 30 years in prison for his ideological influence on the attackers. He received a pardon from the King in 2011.

The attacks led to a judicial purge against Salafia Jihadia, with Minister of Justice Mohamed Bouzoubaa announcing in 2004 that 2,112 indictments were filed against extremists leading to 903 convictions and 13 death sentences. Authorities also filed arrest warrants against 50 Moroccans and 12 foreign citizens.

On May 26, 2003, ten days after the attacks, Mohamed Omari, Rachid Jalil, and Yassine Lahnech were referred by the public prosecutor to an examining magistrate. Four days later, the public prosecutor referred eight more suspects. Omari, Jalil, Lahnech and Hassan Taoussi, were charged alongside fifty-two defendants for "forming a criminal association, undermining the internal security of the state, sabotage, premeditated homicide and damage causing injury and permanent disability".

In July 2003, Youssef Fikri, the leader of Salafia Jihadia, was tried alongside thirty-one members of his network for his involvement other terrorist attacks in 2001 as well as his supposed ideological influence on the attackers. During his trial, Fikri admitted that "yes, I admit to killing several of God's enemies, and this trial is nothing more than a play". Fikri was sentenced to death alongside ten other co-conspirators. Among those sentenced to death was the group's second-in-command, Mohammd Damir, who was reported as having disappeared until his trial.

On July 21, 2003, the trial for the attacks began at the criminal chamber of the Court of Appeal of Casablanca, who had issued an indictment against fifty-two people. Prosecution was led by Abdellah Alaoui Belghiti, the King's general prosecutor for the Court of Appeal of Casablanca and the case was presided by Judge Lahcen Tolfi. At a preliminary hearing, Omari denied his role in the attacks, stating "I reject all the accusations, I deny them, I didn't kill anyone". The prosecutor presented propaganda cassettes from jihadist groups in Chechnya, Palestine and Afghanistan that were seized from the cell's hideout, the defendants insisted that these were "religious cassettes". Upon questioning by the prosecutor, Omari defended his role in the attacks by saying they were "to highlight social inequality". Omari denied that Salafia Jihadia existed and claimed it was "an invention of the newspapers", rather claiming that the attackers belonged to a group named "Ahl al-Kitab wal Sunnah" (lit. 'people of the Book and the Sunnah').

On August 19, 2003, the court delivered its verdict, with 37 sentenced to life in prison, 17 sentenced to thirty years, and 16 sentenced to twenty years. The surviving suicide bombers, Mohamed Omari, Rachid Jalil, and Hassan Taoussi were sentenced to death. Yassine Lahnech, who had recruited a network of 96 suicide bombers to attack multiple tourist sites in the country, was also sentenced to death. Mahjoub Grimet, who helped house the terror cell, was also sentenced to thirty years in prison.

The court also sentenced radical preachers said to have had an ideological influence on the attackers, charging them with "offences against the internal security of the state, criminal conspiracy, sabotage and incitement to violence". The defendants appeared inside an armoured glass cage set up in the courtroom. Many of the defendants yelled "Allah Akbar" while the verdict was pronounced.

Radical preacher Zakaria Miloudi, the leader of As-Sirat al-Mustaqim, was sentenced to life in prison. Preachers Mohamed Fizazi, Abdelkrim Chadli, Mohamed Abdelouahab Rafiqui, Hassan Kettani, and Omar Haddouchi were sentenced to thirty years in prison for their supposed ideological influence on the attackers. Miloudi later died in 2006 of an asthma attack in prison, with Miloudi's family having accused the penitentiary administration of having neglected him.

In December 2005, the Court of Appeal of Salé handed down a death sentence to Salafia Islamia members Mohcine Bouarfa and Taoufik El Hanouichi. El Hanouichi murdered Albert Rebibo while on the run from authorities in connections with the Casablanca attacks. In December 2006, Salafia Jihadia members Abdelmalek Bouzgarne and Youssef Âddad were sentenced to death in connection with the Salafia Islamia killing spree in the late 1990s. Bouzgarne was also wanted for questioning in relation with the 2003 attacks.

On February 26, 2009, Saâd Houssaïni was sentenced to 15 years in prison for "undermining the internal security of the state, forming a criminal gang to prepare and commit terrorist acts as part of a collective plan to cause serious damage to public order, collecting and managing funds, inciting others to commit terrorist acts and organising public meetings without authorisation". Karim El Mejjati was given a 20-year sentence in absentia.

In 2007, a French court sentenced French-Moroccans Fouad Charouali, Rachid Aït El Hadj, Bachir Ghoumid, Redouane Aberbri, and French Turk Attila Türk to prison sentences ranging from six to eight years for their material support to the Casablanca terrorist cell. In 2012, Charouali was arrested in Munich under an international arrest warrant issued by Moroccan authorities in connection with the attacks before being deported to France. In 2016, nine years after their conviction, they were stripped of their French citizenship and are facing deportation. In 2020, the European Court of Human Rights (ECHR) ruled in favor of the French government, ruling that "terrorist violence constituted in itself a serious threat to human rights".

In 2009, Hassan El Haski was acquitted of charges relating to the attacks by an anti-terrorism court in Salé. After an appeal, El Haski was sentenced to ten years in prison and was sent to Spain to serve the remainder of his fourteen-year sentence in connection with the Madrid train bombings. In 2019, El Haski was deported to Morocco after serving his sentence in Spain. The same year, a Moroccan court rejected his application to be freed on time served in Spain on the basis of double jeopardy.

In 2020, Saïd Mansour was sentenced to death by the Court of Appeal of Casablanca in connection with the attacks. He was stripped of his Danish citizenship in 2015, becoming the first person in Denmark to lose Danish citizenship, and was extradited to Morocco in 2019. Danish authorities assured that they had engaged in negotiations to avoid Mansour's execution. In 2021, Mansour's sentence was commuted to 25 years in prison.

== Aftermath ==
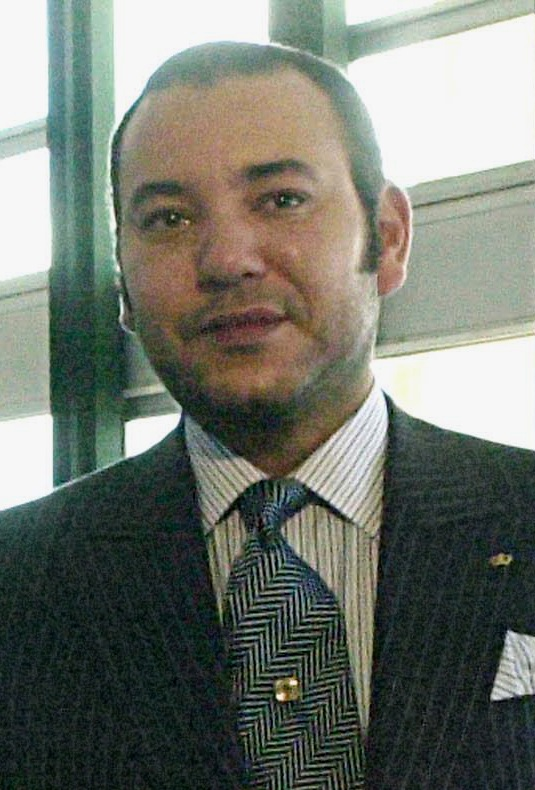
The King of Morocco, Mohammed VI, pictured in 2004

The attacks were the deadliest terrorist attacks in Morocco's history. The attacks immediately set a climate described as mass psychosis throughout Casablanca and a shell-shock effect across the country, with car crashes multiplying in the city in the following days. Journalist Hassan Hamdani described the attacks as the "Moroccan equivalent of 9/11, everyone knew where they were on that day". The attacks came four days after Riyadh compound bombings and was condemned by numerous world leaders. In response to the Riyadh and Casablanca attacks, the U.S. Department of Homeland Security raised its terror threat level to Orange.

In the immediate aftermath of the attacks, the House of Councillors voted on May 28, 2003, in favor of law no. 03–03 on the fight against terrorism, which had been criticized for its broadening of the term "terrorism" and has been compared to the Patriot Act. Under the new law, terrorism suspects are allowed to be detained in police custody for twelve days before being charged and presented to an examining magistrate. In the five years following the attack, around 1,000 extremists were convicted under the law.

Nine days after the attacks, a large-scale demonstration was held in Casablanca with banners saying "No to terrorism" and "Don't touch my country". Families of victims were given a compensation of 500,000 dirham from the government. The attacks led to increased focus on radical terrorism by security services, with authorities dismantling 2,000 cells and arresting 3,500 arrests on charges linked to terrorism from 2002 to 2021.

On June 28, Hamidou Laânigri, then-Director for Territorial Surveillance, was demoted to Director-General of National Security. After the attacks, Abdellatif Hammouchi was named second-in-command of the DST behind Hamidou Laânigri. Hammouchi later became the Director-General of National Security and Territorial Surveillance in 2005. In September 2003, two 14-year-old twins and a 17-year-old were arrested for plotting a suicide attack in a Rabat supermarket, the girls were sentenced to five years in a juvenile rehabilitation center.

In a speech made after the law was voted for, King Mohammed VI proclaimed in a speech that the attacks were "contrary to our tolerant and generous faith" and that "those who ordered it and those who carried it out are despicable villains who can in no way claim to be Moroccans or authentic Muslims, so ignorant are they of the tolerance that characterizes this religion". The King toured the bombing sites and was cheered by crowds of people.

The attacks led to increased pressure on the Islamist Justice and Development Party (PJD), who were blamed by civil society for the attacks. The attacks were condemned by the PJD, with Ahmed Raissouni, then-president of the party's religious branch, the Movement of Unity and Reform, stating that the suicide bombers "were the first victims as they're headed off to hell" and that they were motivated by "blind ideas coming from ignorant people".

On April 24, 2004, King Mohammed VI and then-Prime Minister of Spain José Luis Rodríguez Zapatero inaugurated a commemorative plaque at Mohammed V Square in central Casablanca. The plaque was inscribed with a verse from the Quran: "if anyone kills a person, it would be as if he killed the entirety of mankind" (Surah Al-Ma'idah 5:52-53).

The attacks shined light at the deplorable state of shanty towns in the country, with authorities launching the "Cities without slums" (French: Villes sans bidonvilles) initiative the next year and the King announcing the National Human Development Initiative (INDH) in 2005. In 2007, a series of suicide bombings occurred in Casablanca, killing a police officer. The attacks were led by Abdelfettah Raydi, who blew himself up in a cyber-cafe. Raydi had previously been arrested in connection with the 2003 Casablanca attacks but was pardoned by the King.

On August 13, 2007, a civil engineer working for the Ministry of Finance detonated a gas cylinder hidden in his backpack a few meters from a tourist bus. The engineer, Hicham Doukkali, survived the blast which occurred on his 30th birthday and ripped off his left hand, broke his right leg and tore his abdomen and chest. According to authorities, he was a member of a violent offshoot of Al Adl Wal Ihsane. Doukklai was sentenced to life in prison in 2008.

In April 2008, nine prisoners motivated by "injustice" and imprisoned for their role in the attacks escaped from Kenitra central prison during the night by digging a 22 meter long tunnel under the prison. One of the prisoners, Abdelhadi Eddahbi, was on death row for his involvement with Youssef Fikri's network, six were sentenced to life imprisonment and two to 20 years. The escape was seen as an embarrassment to the government which led initiatives to secure prisons across the country. The prisoners were captured in June and were given sentences ranging from 18 months to 10 years in prison.

In February 2011, Mohamed Fizazi, who was serving a sentence for his ideological influence on the attackers, was pardoned by King Mohammed VI. In February 2012, three more preachers imprisoned on the same charge, Abdelouahab Rafiqui, Hassan Kettani, and Omar Haddouchi, were pardoned by the King. As a sign of reconciliation, the King attended Friday prayers led by Fizazi in 2014. In 2011, the second-in-command of Salafia Jihadia, Mohamed Damir, had his sentence commuted to thirty years in prison. In May 2016, Youssef Fikri wrote a letter to the press requesting that his death sentence be "expedited".

In 2017, the government announced a program titled "Moussalaha" (lit. 'reconciliation'), where prisoners sentenced on terror charges could be eligible for a royal pardon after being rehabilitated. In August 2017, Mohamed Damir was freed as part of the Moussalaha program and started working at an association of Islamic scholars in Mohammadia where he assists detainees as part of the program. In 2021, one of the prisoners who escaped from Kenitra central prison in 2008, Mohamed Chatbi, was pardoned by the King on compassionate grounds based on "medical problems".

== See also ==
- 1907 Bombardment of Casablanca
- 2007 Casablanca bombings
- Horses of God – 2012 semi-fictional film about the bombers
