= Sidi Moumen Cultural Center =

- Sidi Moumen Cultural Center
- المركز الثقافي سيدي مؤمن
- President: Boubker Mazoz

The Sidi Moumen Cultural Center (Arabic: المركز الثقافي سيدي مؤمن) is a community center located in the Sidi Moumen neighborhood on the outskirts of Casablanca, Morocco. It officially opened in 2007.

== History ==
It is considered the first social community center of its kind in Sidi Moumen, one of Casablanca's most poorest areas. The center was established in the aftermath of the 2003 suicide bombings in Casablanca; the perpetrators came from the disadvantaged Sidi Moumen neighborhood.

== Activities ==
The Sidi Moumen Cultural Center affords the neighborhood's youth opportunities to encounter and participate in the performing arts, to learn foreign languages, to exhibit their creative talents, and to develop professional skills. In addition, the center receives national and international artists, and hosts lectures, symposia, and other events.
