= Casablanca bombings =

Casablanca bombings may refer to:

- Bombing of Casablanca (1907), a French naval bombardment that marked the beginning of the French conquest of Morocco
- Naval Battle of Casablanca, November 1942 US naval battle and invasion of Casablanca, Morocco
- 2003 Casablanca bombings, a series of suicide bombings in Casablanca, Morocco
- 2007 Casablanca bombings, a series of suicide bombings in Casablanca, Morocco
