= 2002 Strait of Gibraltar terror plot =

Terrorist incident in Morocco

- Part of Insurgency in the Maghreb (2002–present)
- Date: May–June 2002
- Location: Strait of Gibraltar
- Suspects: al-Qaeda (GICM)

In May and June 2002, Moroccan authorities arrested several people in connection with an Al-Qaeda plot to attack American and British naval ships and shipping in the Strait of Gibraltar. Three Saudi Arabians were arrested for the plot, followed by several Moroccan Islamists, many members of Salafia Jihadia.

== Plot and arrests ==
The three Saudi nationals arrested were Zuher al-Tbaiti, the suspected ringleader, and Abdullah al-Ghamdi and Hilal al-Assiri. The three eventually confessed to the plot, having escaped Afghanistan in 2001 during the Battle of Tora Bora. The men had reportedly been instructed to the plot by a senior aide to Osama bin Laden based in Pakistan, named "Abu Bilal", suspected by authorities to be Abd al-Rahim al-Nashiri who later reportedly confessed to having been behind the plot. The plot involved using speedboats packed with explosives in suicide bombings against American and British vessels, and possibly suicide bombings in Gibraltar.

The Saudis were married to Moroccan women through the Moroccan Islamic Combatant Group (GICM). The wives of two of the men were arrested, suspected of having been used as money couriers for al-Qaeda and to have been aware of the plots; one of the two women attempted to hide explosives in her apartment when she was arrested by security forces. According to one official, the plot had been planned "well before" the September 11 attacks. Attacks were reportedly also planned in Morocco, notably in the tourist centre of Marrakesh. The three Saudi Arabians were sentenced to ten years imprisonment in February 2003.

The plot was widely compared to the USS Cole bombing of 2000. The bombing of USS Cole, as well as the later bombing of the French-registered oil tanker Limburg in October 2002, have also been linked to al-Nashiri.

In 2003, NATO began escorting civilian ships through the Strait of Gibraltar amid fears of terrorist attacks. The Strait was mentioned as a target by Al-Qaeda in 2014, when through its magazine Resurgence it urged its followers of attacks against central transport hubs to destabilise the world economy.

== Zuher al-Tbaiti ==
Zuher al-Tbaiti (Arabic: زهير التبايتي) is a Saudi Arabian who was arrested in Morocco in May 2002 as the suspected ringleader of the plot. He was sentenced to ten years in prison along with two other Saudis, Abdullah al-Ghamdi and Hilal al-Assiri. Al-Tbaiti served as a military commander in Afghanistan before joining the Bosnian mujahideen as an artillery expert during the Bosnian War in the 1990s. Along with al-Ghamdi and al-Assiri, he escaped Afghanistan in 2001 during the Battle of Tora Bora, and arrived in Morocco.

== See also ==
- Operation Active Endeavour
- 2003 Casablanca bombings
