= Salafia Jihadia =

Salafi Jihadist militant group based in Spain and Morocco

- Dates active: 1990s–present
- Active regions: Morocco; Spain; Western Sahara
- Ideology: Salafi jihadism
- Size: 400+ (2002)
- Wars: the Insurgency in the Maghreb (2002–present) and 2011–2012 Moroccan protests

Salafia Jihadia (Arabic: السلفية الجهادية al-Salafiya al-jihadiya) is a Salafi Jihadist militant group based in Morocco and Spain. The group was allied with al-Qaeda and Moroccan Islamic Combatant Group (GICM).

The group was known for its participation in the 2003 Casablanca bombings, in which twelve suicide bombers killed 33 people and injured over 100. Salafia Jihadia has variously been described as a movement or loose network of groups, or as a generic term applied by Moroccan authorities for militant Salafi activists.

== History ==
Salafia Jihadia was formed in the early 1990s by Mujahideen veterans of the Soviet–Afghan War. The group was formed in opposition to the Arab states, including Morocco, that had joined the coalition against Iraq in the Gulf War. Along with the Takfir wal-Hijra group, Salafia Jihadia was eventually responsible for around 300 murders in Morocco as punishment for "non-Islamic behaviour." The group has been associated with the Moroccan Islamic Combatant Group (GICM). It also had links to the former Algerian Salafist Group for Preaching and Combat (GSPC) and the Libyan Islamic Fighting Group (LIFG). By 2002 the group had begun establishing ties with al-Qaeda, and had 400 known members.

In 2002 members of the group were among those arrested as part of an al-Qaeda plot to attack Western shipping in the Strait of Gibraltar with a speedboat crewed by suicide bombers. In July 2003, in a trial unrelated to the Casablanca bombings, ten members of the group were sentenced to death, and eight others to life imprisonment. In February 2004, two cells in Fez and Meknes were dismantled, with 37 people arrested after explosives and weapons were discovered during raids. A Salafia Jihadia network operating in several Moroccan towns, including Mohammedia near Casablanca was unravelled by security forces in March 2005. In December 2006, Spanish authorities announced that a cell of eleven people, ten Spanish citizens and one Moroccan associated with Salafia Jihadia had been dismantled. According to Spanish anti-terrorism judge Baltasar Garzón, members of jihadist cells in northern Morocco speak Spanish fluently and can easily slip in and out of Spain due to the short distance.

After a decade of operating in secret, the group began to publicly appear in Morocco alongside 20 February Movement demonstrations as part of the Arab Spring in 2011. In 2012, Morocco's King Mohammed pardoned several members and ideological leaders of the group, including Omar al-Haddouchi, Hassan Kettani and Mohamed Abdelwahhab al-Rafiki. The pardons came after the Islamist Justice and Development Party had won the elections and become the ruling party in the country following the Arab Spring, and after pressure from human rights organisations. After the release of several radical Salafis, some ideological leaders of the group toned down their criticism of the king; in 2014 this began to cause a split in the movement as some members instead joined the Islamic State of Iraq and the Levant (ISIL), which was rejected by others.

== Organisation and ideology ==
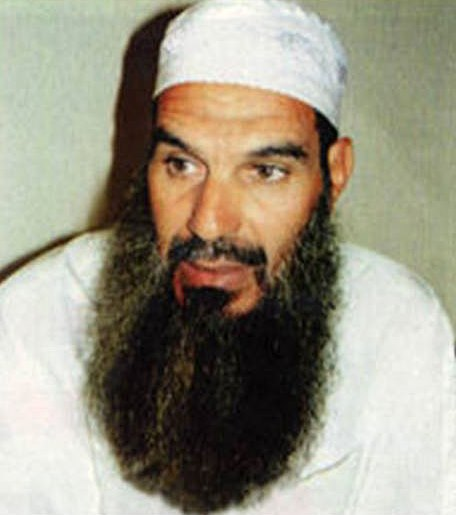
Mohamed Fizazi. Salafist jihadist and ideologist of Salafia Jihadia terrorist group

Salafia Jihadia is said to function as a network of several loosely affiliated Salafi jihadist groups and cells, including groups such as al Hijra Wattakfir, Attakfir Bidum Hijra, Assirat al Mustaqim, Ansar al Islam and Moroccan Afghans. The spiritual leader and founder of the group is Mohammed Fizazi, former imam of the al-Quds Mosque (which was shut down by German authorities in 2010).

Fizazi was arrested in 2003 and sentenced to 30 years imprisonment for his radical statements and connection to the Casablanca bombings. Salafia Jihadia has since spawned a wider ideological movement out of Saudi Arabia and the Gulf states.

== Casablanca bombings ==
On 16 May 2003, twelve suicide bombers from the Salafia Jihadia cell Al-Sirat Al-Musqatim ("The Correct Path") were responsible for four coordinated bombing attacks targeting Westerners and Jews in Casablanca, which killed 33 people (plus all twelve suicide bombers) and injured over 100. In the aftermath of the bombings, up to more than 2,000 individuals were prosecuted in Morocco in a wide-scale crackdown on Islamists and criminals. The Moroccan Justice Ministry subsequently claimed that Salafia Jihadia had 699 activists in the country. Some of the suicide bombers who failed to detonate their vests were captured by police. Three of the failed bombers and another person, all members of Salafia Jihadia, were sentenced to death in August 2003. In September, a court in Kenitra gave 27 people, also all members of Salafia Jihadia sentences ranging from six months to 15 years for their involvement in the attacks.

As part of the crackdown after the Casablanca bombings, a court in Rabat in September 2003 sentenced a Frenchman, Robert Richard Antoine Pierre (aka Abu Abderrahmane) and three other members of Salafia Jihadia to life, while 22 others were given sentences ranging from 10 to 30 years imprisonment. Accused of plotting attacks in Tangier, Pierre was stated to have founded the Salafia Jihadia cell Al-Oussoud Khalidine ("Timeless Lions"), which had sent recruits for training in Afghanistan. At least sixteen members of the group were identified, many of whom fled to Spain via Ceuta, while eight were arrested in Morocco.

In November 2007, a trial was opened against 51 people arrested across several cities suspected of involvement with the Casablanca bombings, who were mainly associated with Salafia Jihadia. Others convicted as part of the attacks were members of GICM.

Salafia Jihadia is also thought to have had connections to and been involved in the 2004 Madrid train bombings that killed 191 people and wounded over 2,000. One of the terrorists convicted for the bombings, Jamal Zougam, was known to the intelligence services of several countries for his links to a complex international jihadist network that included Salafia Jihadia. Zougam was also implicated by some of the failed suicide bombers who had been captured in the Casablanca bombings.
