= Saad Hassar =

Moroccan politician

Secretary of State for the Interior
- In office 19 September 2007 – 3 January 2012
- Preceded by: Fouad Ali El Himma (as Delegate-Minister of the Interior)
- Succeeded by: Charki Draiss (as Delegate-Minister of the Interior)

Personal details
- Born: 21 February 1953 (age 73) Salé, Morocco
- Party: Independent
- Education: École Spéciale des Travaux Publics (ESTP); Paul Sabatier University
- Occupation: Politician, engineer

Saad Hassar (Arabic: سعد حصار – born 21 February 1953, Salé) is a Moroccan politician. Between 2007 and 2012, he was Secretary of State for the Interior in the cabinet of Abbas El Fassi, succeeding Fouad Ali El Himma.

Saad Hassar studied at the Mission laïque française of Rabat (Lycée Descartes) and at the École Spéciale des Travaux Publics of Paris. He is a nephew of Abdelkrim al-Khatib, co-founder of the National Popular Movement which later became the Justice and Development Party, and cousin of Moroccan Gendarmerie General Hosni Benslimane.

== See also ==
- Cabinet of Morocco
