= Omar al-Haddouchi =

Moroccan Islamic scholar

Umar al Haddouchi

Personal life
- Born: Umar ibn Massoud al-Haddouchi Al Hoceima
- Other name: Abu Al Fadl

Religious life
- Religion: Islam

Muslim leader
- Influenced by: Muhammad Abu Khubza, Bin Baz, Ibn Uthaymeen, Muhammad Qutb
- Influenced: Salafia Jihadia, Nasir al Fahd

Omar al-Haddouchi (Arabic: عمر الحدوشي; born 1970) is a Moroccan Islamic scholar who is among the leaders of the Salafi movement in Morocco.

== Education ==
Al-Haddouchi was born in Al Hoceima, Morocco in 1970, and began studying and at a young age with various Moroccan scholars, most notably Muhammad Abu Khubza whom he studied with for eight years before traveling to Saudi Arabia to continue his studies.

== History ==
He said during his trial, "We are preachers, not revolutionaries. It is not our job to judge others, which is a prerogative of the Sultan and his delegates".

== 2011 pardon ==
Al-Haddouchi was sentenced to thirty years in prison because of his connections to the perpetrators of 2003 Casablanca bombings, but was released from prison in 2011 after the Moroccan King Mohammed VI gave him a pardon in an Arab Spring initiative.

=== 2012 ===
On Apr 15, 2012 he called for all Muslims living in France to leave and return to North Africa.

On October 21, 2012, a leader of Ansar al-Sharia Morocco, Hassan Younsi, was arrested after leaving the home of Omar al-Haddouchi.
