= Sidi Bernoussi Stadium =

Stadium in Morocco

- المركب الرياضي أحمد أهراس بسيدي البرنوصي
- Sidi Bernoussi Sports Complex
- Interactive map of Sidi Bernoussi Stadium
- Full name: Ahmed Ahras Sports Complex in the Sidi Bernoussi district
- Location: Sidi Bernoussi, Casablanca, Morocco
- Owner: Casablanca-Settat Region
- Surface: Grass (main pitch)

Construction
- Rebuilt: ?-2024
- Cost: 36 million DH
- Architects: Yassine Amraoui, Youssef Alami
- General contractor: ATELIER REYAD

Tenant
- CR Bernoussi

The Ahmed Ahras Sports Complex in the Sidi Bernoussi district, popularly called as just the Sidi Bernoussi Complex and previously known as the Sidi Bernoussi Stadium is a multi-sports venue located alogside the Ahmed Ahras boulevard in the Sidi Bernoussi district of Casablanca, Morocco. It is primarily used for football matches as the home of Rachad Bernoussi club.

== Facilities ==
After the recent renovations, the complex is configured around the main football-specific natural grass stadium. The auxiliary infrastructure also includes:

- Adjacent artificial pitch mini-stadium with a 310 m running track
- Indoor sports hall
- Semi-Olympic-size (25 m) swimming pool
- On-site 15-room sports residence.

== History ==
Prior to the rebuilt ending in 2020s, the stadium had an estimated seating capacity of 10,000 spectators.
