= Hassan Kettani =

Moroccan preacher

Hassan El Kettani
- Title: Sheikh

Personal life
- Born: Mohamed Hassan Echerif El Kettani; August 16, 1976 (age 49) Salé, Morocco

Religious life
- Religion: Islam
- Denomination: Sunni
- Jurisprudence: Maliki
- Creed: Athari
- Movement: Salafi

Muslim leader
- Influenced by: Muhammad Abu Khubza, Abdul Qader Arnaoot, Abdullah al-Ghumari, Abd al-Aziz al-Ghumari
- Influenced: Salafia Jihadia

Mohamed Hassan Echerif El Kettani (Arabic: حسن الكتاني; born 16 August 1972) is a Muslim scholar and former political prisoner from Morocco. Imprisoned for alleged connections to the 2003 Casablanca bombings, Kettani was pardoned by Mohammed VI eight years later after efforts by his lawyer and human rights groups, and the success of Islamists in Morocco's parliament. However many human rights groups have pointed at the fact that Shaykh Hasan was targeted due to the crackdown on Islamist scholars and activist, he was released in 2013 after years of torture and persecution.

== Personal life ==
Mohamed Hassan Echerif El Kettani was born in 1972 in Salé. His father, Moulay Ali Kettani, was an electrical engineer that taught in Jeddah and Winnipeg, he co-founded the Universidad Islámica Averroes in Cordoba. His grandfather, Mohamed Montassir Kettani, was a professor in Saudi Arabia and an advisor to King Faisal, he founded the International Alliance of Ulama.

The Kettani family has historically been a part of Morocco's religious establishment, serving as both academics and preachers for centuries. He is the great grandson of Muhammad ibn Ja'far al-Kattani.

Hassan Kettani studied under fellow Moroccan cleric Muhammad Abu Khubza, Abdullah al-Ghumari and Abd al-Aziz al-Ghumari, in addition to scholars outside Morocco including Saudi cleric Muhammad ibn al-Uthaymin, Algerian scholar of the Qur'an Abu Bakr al-Jazaeri and Albanian scholar of Hadith Abdul Qader Arnaoot.

== Sentencing ==
On February 18, 2003, Kettani was arrested by Moroccan authorities. On September 23, he was sentenced to 20 years in prison in connection with the 2003 Casablanca bombings, for which authorities accused him of being an ideological leader. Kettani denied this and asserted that his conviction was politically motivated and illegal. Human rights groups criticized his sentencing as unfair. In June 2005, he and 664 other Islamists began a hunger strike in prison to protest their convictions. Moroccan politician Mohamed Bouzoubaa criticized the move as being more concerned with politics than human rights, though Kettani's lawyer Mustafa Ramid upheld that he and other Islamists were victims of unjust trials. A second hunger strike took place at the prison in Kenitra in 2010 though most detainees ceased after negotiations with authorities; Kettani continued the strike longer than all other detainees, continuing to uphold his innocence and demand a reopening of his case.

On February 5, 2012, Mohammed VI of Morocco pardoned Kettani along with other Islamists whom human rights groups believed had been unfairly jailed. Kettani's lawyer Ramid, who later became Morocco's Minister of Justice, referred to the pardon as an attempt by the government to hold out the olive branch for Islamists willing to make positive contributions to public life and shun extremism, comments with which Kettani concurred.

== Post-release ==
Since his pardon, Kettani has denounced extremism and encouraged its rejection among Moroccan conservatives; regardless, he and another Islamist were deported upon arrival at Tunis–Carthage International Airport on May 14, 2012. Kettani, who had been invited to the country by Tunisian Islamists, claimed he was under the impression that he would be able to enter Tunisia freely after the Tunisian revolution. Despite his deportation, Kettani still praised the Tunisian airport security, claiming that he had been treated well by the authorities and even received an apology from Ennahda Movement officials before his deportation.

== Views ==
Kettani has been described as an ideological leader of the Salafia Jihadia movement, though he and other detainees rejected this and saw themselves as normal Sunni Muslims with a Salafist orientation. Since his pardon he has openly criticized what he defines as Wahhabism, comments which have caused rifts among Moroccan Salafists. He has often spoken against what he sees as depraved Western influence in Moroccan society, and his views prior to his incarceration had been regarded as extreme by many in the security establishment. Since his release, Kettani and several other former detainees have been noted as denouncing extremism and violence. Kettani, along with other Moroccan conservatives, distanced themselves from the Moroccan branch of Ansar al-Sharia, refusing to lend support to the budding group.

Kettani's family being rooted in Morocco's traditional religious scholarship, he is an expert in both the Zahirite and Malikite schools of Islamic law, though his conservative views have been described as being at odds with the latter.
