= Abu Dujana (disambiguation) =

Abu Dujana was a companion of the Islamic prophet Muhammad.

Abu Dujana may also refer to:

- Abu Dujana (Jemaah Islamiah) (born 1968), Indonesian military leader of Jemaah Islamiah
- Abu Dujana (Jordanian) (1977–2009), alias of Humam Khalil Abu-Mulal al-Balawi, Jordanian doctor
- Abu Dujana (Lashkar-e-Taiba) (died 2017), Lashkar-e-Taiba terrorist
- Abu Dujana Al-Afghani, claimed spokesperson for "al-Qaeda of Europe"
