= Bouchaib Rmail =

Moroccan civil servant (born 1951)

Bouchaib Rmail (Arabic: بوشعيب الرميل; born 1951 in Sidi Bennour Province) used to be director of the DGSN (Direction Général de Sûreté Nationale). He assumed this position in February 2012 replacing Charki Draiss.

In 2004, he obtained a doctorate from Sidi Mohamed Ben Abdellah University of Fes.

== Previous positions ==
- Commissaire in Mohammedia 1981–1993
- Chef de Sûreté Hay Mohammadi-Ain Sebaa 1993–1997
- Chef de Sûreté régionale Fes 1997–2000
- Préfet de Police de Casablanca 2000–2004
- Directeur de la Sécurité Public in the DGSN: 2005–2006
- Préfet de Police de Laayoune 2006–November 2010
- Wali of Mediouna, Morocco November 2010–February 2012
