= Sûreté Nationale (Morocco) =

Police service of Morocco

Direction Générale de la Sûreté Nationale المديرية العامة للأمن الوطني ⵜⴰⵎⵀⵍⴰ ⵜⴰⵎⴰⵜⴰⵢⵜ ⵏ ⵜⵏⴼⵔⵓⵜ ⵜⴰⵏⴰⵎⵓⵔⵜ
- Common name: Sûreté Nationale
- Motto: Arabic: الأمن الوطني... فخورون بخدمتكم; French: Sûreté nationale... fiers de vous servir "National Security... proud to serve you"

Agency overview
- Formed: 16 May 1956
- Annual budget: 13 billion dirham (2022)

Jurisdictional structure
- Operations jurisdiction: Morocco
- Governing body: Ministry of Interior

Operational structure
- Headquarters: Rabat
- Police officers: 79,830 (2023)
- Agency executives: Abdellatif Hammouchi, Director of the DGSN; Abdelouafi Laftit, Minister of the Interior

The General Directorate for National Security (Arabic: المديرية العامة للأمن الوطني, romanized: Aālmdyryh al-ʻĀmmah lil-amn al-Waṭanī; Standard Moroccan Tamazight: ⵜⴰⵎⵀⵍⴰ ⵜⴰⵎⴰⵜⴰⵢⵜ ⵏ ⵜⵏⴼⵔⵓⵜ ⵜⴰⵏⴰⵎⵓⵔⵜ, romanized: tamhla tamatayt n tnfrut tanamurt; French: Direction Générale de la Sûreté Nationale, DGSN) is the national police force of the Kingdom of Morocco. It is responsible for maintaining public order, enforcing the law, and ensuring public security.

The DGSN was established on 16 May 1956 by King Mohammed V. It operates alongside other security forces, notably the Auxiliary Forces and the Royal Gendarmerie.

== History ==
Before the 20th century, a regionalized Shurta (police) enforced Sharia law and ensured security across the country. During the Almohad caliphate, the caliph also took on the role of ṣāḥib al-shurṭa (head of police).

There were regional and tribal Muhtasibs (equivalent to a police commissioner) who were appointed by the Pasha. The Muhtasib had the power to issue fines for minor offenses. Criminals were tried in front of a Qadi, the judge of a Sharia court. The Qadi issued judgements in criminal, civil and commercial cases.

On July 20, 1901, Morocco formed its first national border patrol. The patrol was in charge of ensuring the security of the border with French Algeria, under the control of a commissioner in Oujda.

In 1906, the Algeciras Conference led to various police reforms in Morocco. The reforms established a national police force that would fall under the Sultan's sovereign authority. The police force's recruitment would be overseen by the Makhzen and commanded by Caïds. Additionally, the police force would be stationed in the eight ports that were open to international trade.

In 1912, the General Police Service was created after the installement of the French Protectorate in Morocco. In 1913, a forensic identification unit was formed. A general forensic identification service was formed in November 1931.

On May 16, 1956, a year after Morocco regained independence, the DGSN was formed. The Royal Institute of Police in Kenitra was inaugurated in 1978. The Scientific and Technical Police Laboratory in Casablanca was created in 1991.

On 8 September 2023, an earthquake with a magnitude of 6.8 M_{w} hit the Marrakesh-Safi region of Morocco. DGSN along with DGST has announced it will contribute MAD 50 million to Special Fund for Managing Earthquake Effects. They set up two mobile bakeries near Marrakech, to provide bread to those who were affected by the earthquake.

== Organization ==
In 2007, the Sûreté Nationale had approximately 46,000 personnel. A decade later, in 2017, the number of personnel had increased to 70,000.

As of 2004, the Sûreté Nationale operated the following specialist divisions:

- The Border Police: responsible for border control and surveillance
- Mobile Intervention Corps: tasked with rapid intervention in major emergencies
- National Brigade: primarily responsible for investigation of serious crimes, including terrorism, organized and white-collar crime.

== Directors ==
- Mohammed Laghzaoui (1956–1960)
- Mohamed Oufkir (1960 – mid 1960s)
- Ahmed Dlimi (mid 1960s – 1972)
- Abderrahmane Rabiah (1972–1979)
- Slimane Alaoui (1979–1979)
- Abdelhak Kadirin (1979–1983)
- Hamid El Boukhari (1983–1988)
- Mohammed Dryef (1989–1990)
- General Ouazzani (1990–1993)
- Ahmed Midaoui (1993–1997)
- Hafid Benhachem (1997–2003)
- Hamidou Laanigri (2003–2006)
- Charki Draiss (2006–2012)
- Bouchaib Rmail (2012–2015)
- Abdellatif Hammouchi (2015–present)

== Police ranks ==
=== Police in uniform ===
Moroccan police	Functional titles				
Title Insignia					
Rank	Senior Group Commande	Group Commande	Divisional Security Commander	Senior Security Commander	Security Commander
Title Insignia					
Rank	Senior Security Officer	Security Officer	Chief Brigadier	Brigadier	Security Constable

=== Non Uniform Police ===
Moroccan police	Functional titles				
Title Insignia					
Rank	Director General of Police	Police Prefect	General Controller of Police	Divisional Police Commissioner	Senior Police Commissioner
Title Insignia					
Rank	Police Commissioner	Senior Police Officer	Police Officer	Senior Police Inspector	Police Inspector

== See also ==
- Groupes urbains de sécurité
- Royal Moroccan Gendarmerie
