= Muhammad Bakhit al-Muti'i =

Egyptian Muslim theologian (died 1935)

Muhammad Bakhit al-Muti'i محمد بخيت المطيعي

Personal life
- Born: 1856 Asyut
- Died: 1935 (aged 78–79)
- Main interest(s): Aqidah, Kalam (Islamic theology), Tawhid, Fiqh (Islamic jurisprudence), Usul al-Fiqh, Hadith studies, Tafsir, Logic, Philosophy
- Notable work: Tathir al-Fu'ad min Danas al-I'tiqad

Religious life
- Religion: Islam
- Denomination: Sunni
- Jurisprudence: Hanafi
- Creed: Maturidi

Muslim leader
- Influenced by: Abu Hanifa Muhammad 'Ilish Ahmad al-Dardir Taqi al-Din al-Subki
- Influenced: 'Abdullah al-Ghumari

Muhammad Bakhit al-Muti'i (1854 or 1856 — 1935) was the Grand Mufti of Egypt, judge in the Shari'a Courts, rector of al-Azhar, and one of the leading Hanafi-Maturidi scholars of his time. He was educated at al-Azhar and was teaching in this university for several years. In 1914 he was appointed mufti, a title he held for seven years. He was known as the bitterest foe of the Islamic Reform movement led by Jamal al-Din al-Afghani and Muhammad 'Abduh. He was also known as a devout scholar who chose to lose his position as mufti rather than bow to government pressure to issue a particular fatwa.

Bakhit studied at al-Azhar and taught there from 1875 to 1880, when he was appointed qadi (Muslim judge) of Qalyubiyya, after which he served as a judge in various provincial centers, Alexandria, and Cairo. He was appointed Grand Mufti of Egyp on 21 December 1914, serving until 1921. He opposed Muhammad 'Abduh's reforms at al-Azhar, issued a fatwa (Muslim legal opinion) to warn Muslims against bolshevism (presumably meaning politically inspired violence) in the midst of the 1919 Revolution, and took conservative stands on such issues as the translation of the Quran, women's rights, and the abolition of family awqaf. After he ceased to be the Grand Mufti, he attacked severely 'Ali 'Abd al-Raziq's work al-Islam wa Usul al-Hukm ("Islam and the Principles of Rule").

== Biography ==
He was born in the village of al-Muti'ah in Asyut Governorate. He studied Hanafi fiqh at al-Azhar from 1865 to 1875 and was among those who heard al-Afghani lecturing privately in the Muski district in Cairo. In 1880 he was appointed qadi, and in 1892 he was made Shari'a Legal Supervisor for the Ministry of Justice. The following year he became president of the al-Mahkama al-Shar'iyya (Shari'a Court) in Alexandria, whereupon he was transferred to the Cairo court and became president of its technical council. He was finally appointed President of the Cairo al-Mahkama al-Shar'iyya al-'Ulya, in succession to the 'Abd Allah Jamal al-Din, who went with Hassunah al-Nawawi to the Khedive in Alexandria. In 1915, he was appointed Grand Mufti of Egypt by the new Sultan Husayn Kamil. (Note: According to Jakob Skovgaard-Petersen, the reason for the appointment is probably related to the fact that Muhammad Bakhit had carried out several political tasks, beginning with an investigation into the roles of the government Shari'a notaries (ma'dhunun) in the 1890s, and proceeding with assisting in Fathi Pasha Zaghlul's revision of the al-Mahakim al-Shar'iya (Islamic religious courts) in 1908, upon which were based the laws of 1909 and 1910. On Bakhit's contribution, a confidential report of the British embassy wrote in 1915: "Sheikh Bekhit's especial duty was to help in convincing the religious party that the proposed regulations were in accordance with the religious law or that, at least, there was no sufficient reason for raising objections on that ground." A few years later Muhammad Bakhit had proved himself to be anti-Salafi and anti-British to the degree that he was among the driving forces behind the uprising of 1919. The reasons for Bakhit's dismissal from the Muftiship in June 1920 remain obscure; the explanation given in the obituary in al-Ahram is that he was approaching the age of retirement." However, at the age of 64, he had not actually reached it. Another possibility is his active participation in the revolution of 1919. During the general unrest in April, a meeting was convened in the al-Azhar on the 16th, with representatives of various groups of the population. These agreed on a resolution and decided a national strike, which began on the following day. This historic gathering was chaired by Muhammad Bakhit. Muhammad Bakhit continued to play an active political role. In November 1921 he delivered a speech in front of 2,500 delegates at a major celebration commemorating the third anniversary of Sa'd Zaghlul's demand for independence." Next, on April 6th 1922 the King appointed him member of the commission to draft the new constitution, work which led to the Constitution of 1923. On 30 October 1922, he was one of the speakers at the founding of a new political party, the Liberal Constitutionalists (al-Ahrar al-Dusturiyyun) at Shepheard's Hotel. This party, consisting mainly of rich landowners and a couple of well-known intellectuals, was to be the major competitor to the Wafd party throughout the next decade. In the following years Bakhit was engaged in defending Islam against alleged attacks by Taha Husayn and 'Ali 'Abd al-Raziq, and he was a participant in the Cairo Conference on the Caliphate in 1926.)

== Students ==
Among his most celebrated students was 'Abdullah al-Ghumari.

== Books ==
He published numerous treatises on Islamic law and theology.

Among his well-known writings are:

- Tathir al-Fu'ad min Danas al-I'tiqad (Arabic: تطهير الفؤاد من دنس الاعتقاد).
- Ahsan al-Kalam fima Yata'allaq bi al-Sunnah wa al-Bid'ah min al-Ahkam (Arabic: أحسن الكلام فيما يتعلق بالسنة والبدعة من الأحكام).

== See also ==
- Mustafa Sabri
- List of Hanafis
- List of Muslim theologians
- List of Ash'aris and Maturidis
