= Sidi Bernoussi (arrondissement) =

Sidi Bernoussi سيدي برنوصي
- Arrondissement of Casablanca
- Interactive map of Sidi Bernoussi
- Coordinates: 33°36′26″N 7°30′19″W
- Country: Morocco
- Region: Casablanca-Settat
- Prefecture: Casablanca
- District: Sidi Bernoussi

Population (2004)
  - Total: 165,324
- Time zone: UTC+0 (GMT)

Sidi Bernoussi (Arabic: سيدي برنوصي) is an arrondissement and northeastern suburb of Casablanca, in the Sidi Bernoussi district of the Casablanca-Settat region of Morocco. As of 2004 it had 165,324 inhabitants.
