= Abu Dujana al-Afghani =

Claimed spokesperson for Al-Qaeda of Europe

Abu Dujana al-Afghani, or Abu Nayaf al-Afghani was a claimed spokesperson for "Al-Qaeda of Europe" who demanded an end to Spanish support and involvement in the war on terror. Abu Dujana claimed responsibility for the 2004 Madrid train bombings, as well as a failed train bombing the following month.

== Activities and identification ==
On 13 March 2004 a video was found by a mosque in Madrid in which Abu Dujana claimed responsibility for the 11 March Madrid train bombings on behalf of "Al-Qaeda in Europe", and on 3 April a letter was sent under the name to a Spanish news station, claiming responsibility for an attempted bombing of a train en route from Madrid to Seville on 2 April, and promising more attacks unless Spain withdrew from the war on terror (Spain eventually withdrew following a general election that brought Socialists to power in April).

Abu Dujana has been speculated to be two people: Jamal Ahmidan "the Chinese" who was arrested after the attacks, or more likely Youssef Belhadj, a Moroccan based in Molenbeek, Belgium who in 2008 was found guilty of belonging to a terrorist group and sentenced to 12 years in prison, thought by Spanish authorities to be Abu Dujana. Belhajd, also thought to have been connected to the 2003 Casablanca bombings, was arrested in Belgium on 1 February 2005 and extradited to Spain. Convicted after the Madrid bombings, Belhadj was the leader of a Belgian cell of the Moroccan Islamic Combatant Group (GICM) along with Hassan el-Haski.
