= GSI-GR =

Unit of the Royal Moroccan Gendarmerie

Royal Gendarmerie Security and Intervention Group
- Groupement de Sécurité et d'Intervention de la Gendarmerie Royale فرقة الأمن والتدخل للدرك الملكي
- Active: 1987 – present
- Country: Morocco
- Agency: Royal Moroccan Gendarmerie
- Type: Police tactical unit
- Role: Law enforcement; Counter-terrorism; Hostage rescue; Special operations
- Headquarters: near Temara, Morocco
- Motto: يعيش الملك; Long Live the King
- Abbreviation: GSI-GR

Structure
- Sworn members: ≈ 100 operators

Commanders
- Notable commanders: Maj-Gen Mohamed Haramou

Notables
- Significant operation(s): See list: Perejil Island crisis (2002); Casablanca bombings (2007); Gdeim Izik riots (2010)

The GSI-GR (French: Groupement de Sécurité et d'Intervention de la Gendarmerie Royale; Arabic: فرقة الأمن والتدخل للدرك الملكي; transl. Royal Gendarmerie Security and Intervention Group), also known as the GSI and previously known as the GIGR, is the elite police tactical unit of the Royal Moroccan Gendarmerie.

== History ==
In 1988, the GIGR rescued nine French speleologists in the Win-Timdouine cave after a three day long rescue operation which involved delivering aid, which is one of the biggest underground systems in Africa.

In April 2007, the GIGR launched a raid in Casablanca against suspected terrorist cells which resulted in the death of a police officer, three militants detonating their suicide vests and a fourth being shot dead by police.

In 2010, following the events in Gdeim Izik, the GIGR arrested numerous sympathizers of the Polisario Front.

In 2024, the GSI-GR participated in the Kuwait SWAT Elite International Competition and ranked #15.

== Organisation ==
GIGR is composed of the following units:

Equestrian and paratrooper units

- 1 Parachute squadron (BIP)
- 1 SWAT team
- 1 EOD team
- 1 maritime assault
- 1 Commando Group of the Guard
- 1 Air Assault

== Training ==
GIGR members are chosen from the Meknes Royal Military Academy and are transferred to the Royal School of Gendarmerie in Marrakesh, with only cadets showing "exceptional physical and mental abilities" are transferred to the GSI-GR.

== Duties ==
Led by a colonel-major, the unit's headquarters are confidential, located between Skhirat and Témara.

Among GIGR's missions are counterterrorism, hostage rescue, close protection, aerial surveillance, maritime control, disaster response and combatting organized crime.

The GSI-GR corps has around a hundred members and is shrouded in secrecy, with its missions, always sensitive, being kept secret. However, the unit has occasionally opened up to the media.

The unit is deployed on direct orders from the gendarmerie's general command and is organized to respond urgently to all types of terrorist threats and to restore public order.
