= Abdullah al-Ghumari =

Muslim preacher and jurist

Abdullah bin al-Siddiq al-Ghumari

Personal life
- Born: 1910 Tangier
- Died: 1993 (aged 82–83)
- Education: Al-Azhar University
- Occupation: Hadith scholar

Religious life
- Religion: Islam
- Denomination: Sunni
- Tariqa: Shadhiliyyah
- Movement: Sufism

Abu al-Fadl Abdullah bin Muhammad bin al-Siddiq al-Ghumari (Arabic: عبد الله بن الصديق الغماري; 1910–1993) was a Muslim preacher, scholar of hadith, jurist and theologian from Morocco.

== Life ==
Ghumari was born in Tangier in 1910, and died there in 1993. As a child, he was primarily educated by his father Muhammad bin al-Siddiq al-Ghumari, an Islamic scholar. He memorized the Qur'an at an early age, in addition to Bulugh al-Maram, Alfiya and Ajārūmīya in Arabic grammar.

Ghumari later travelled to Fas for his higher education, but then enrolled in the University of al-Karaouine. While there, he also studied Mosque of Uqba, a UNESCO World Heritage Site and important seat of Muslim religious learning. During his study, Ghumari studies canonical texts in Sunni Islam, including Al-Qastallani's explanation of Sahih al-Bukhari and the works of Khalil ibn Ishaq al-Jundi. Eventually, Ghumari switched from Karaouine to Al-Azhar University in 1930 and graduating the next year. During his education, Ghumari was a student of Al-Kawthari, of whom Ghumari would later hold extremely negative views.

Due to fears in the wider Arab world regarding the influence of the Muslim Brotherhood in the mid-twentieth century, Ghumari was accused of having ties to a foreign group. In 1961, he was sentenced to ten years in prison, likely due to his time spent in Egypt where the Brotherhood had formed. His older brother, Ahmad al-Ghumari, fell ill upon hearing of his younger brother's long sentence and died eight months later.

== Teachers ==
He studied under Muhammad al-Tahir ibn 'Ashur, Yusuf al-Nabhani, Muhammad Zahid al-Kawthari, Muhammad Bakhit al-Muti'i, and Hasanayn Muhammad Makhluf.

== Students ==
Ghumari's students included Muhammad bin Yahya al-Ninowy, Hassan al-Kattani. Hamza Yusuf received an ijazah from him.
