= Ahmad al-Ghumari =

Moroccan Hadith scholars

Ahmad bin al-Siddiq al-Ghumari

Personal life
- Born: 26 December 1902
- Died: 1961 Cairo, United Arab Republic (now Egypt)

Religious life
- Religion: Islam
- Denomination: Sunni
- Jurisprudence: Shafi'i
- Movement: Sufism

Ahmad bin Muhammad bin al-Siddiq al-Ghumari (26 December 1902 – 1961) was a Muslim traditionist and scholar of Hadith from Morocco.

== Career ==
Ghumari authored more than one hundred books. He was well known for a debate which acrimoniously began between him and fellow hadith scholar Muhammad Nasiruddin al-Albani, and later continued with Ghumari's younger brother Abdullah and Albani.

Like the rest of his family, Ghumari was a leader of the Siddiqiyya Sufi order. Muhammad Taqi-ud-Din al-Hilali claimed that al-Ghumari had chosen to live a very simple life and eschewed material excess.

== Views ==
Although a practitioner of Sufism, Ghumari criticized some Sufis, especially the rival Naqshbandi order. Like Ibn Hazm, Ghumari viewed scholarly differences of opinion as wrong and he often used harsh language when responding to intellectual opponents. Having originally followed the Maliki school of thought like most of Muslim scholarship in Morocco, al-Ghumari later switched to the Shafi'i school for a period and finally opted for absolute independent reasoning. Unlike most of Moroccan scholarship, al-Ghumari opposed the Ash'ari school of theology. Muhammad Abu Khubza, among other Moroccan scholars, also claim that al-Ghumari temporarily adhered to the Zaidiyyah school of Shia Islam.

== Works ==
- Tabyin al-balah mimman ankara wujud hadith Wa-man lagha fa-la jumu'ah lahu. Dar al-Basa`ir, 1982.
