= Groupes urbains de sécurité =

Defunct Moroccan special police unit

Groupes urbains de sécurité (GUS) (also known as "Croatia") (English: Urban Security Groups) is a defunct Moroccan special police unit which dealt with urban matters using the "rapid intervention approach."

== Background ==
GUS was established by the Direction Générale de la Sûreté Nationale (DGSN) (the main national police body) on October 17, 2005. The initiative lied within the scope of a general reform, whose principle was "the Police force, near to you for your safety". In October 2006, GUS comprised between 4,000 and 5,000 agents.

The GUS were considered first-aid workers and all members spoke English. They were attached to arrondissements. Because of its nature as an auxiliary police, GUS, for example did not have the right to confiscate driver licences or to file official reports.

Before its disbanding, GUS comprised 6 groups. They were equipped with Peugeot Partner vans and Honda motorcycles.

Because of reforms within the national police and army bodies, the body was disbanded on October 16, 2006, exactly one year later.

The members of the GUS were redeployed to other police departments such as criminal investigation departments and judiciary police.

== Criticism and disbanding ==
While many Moroccans regarded the presence of GUS as a relief, many others considered it as a step back to the rule of the Makhzen.

The disbanding came after many criticisms about excesses or abuses of power were noted. Some irresponsible actions of certain members of this police turned over the public opinion which became discreditory.

== See also ==
- Riot control
