= Propane bomb =

Explosive device

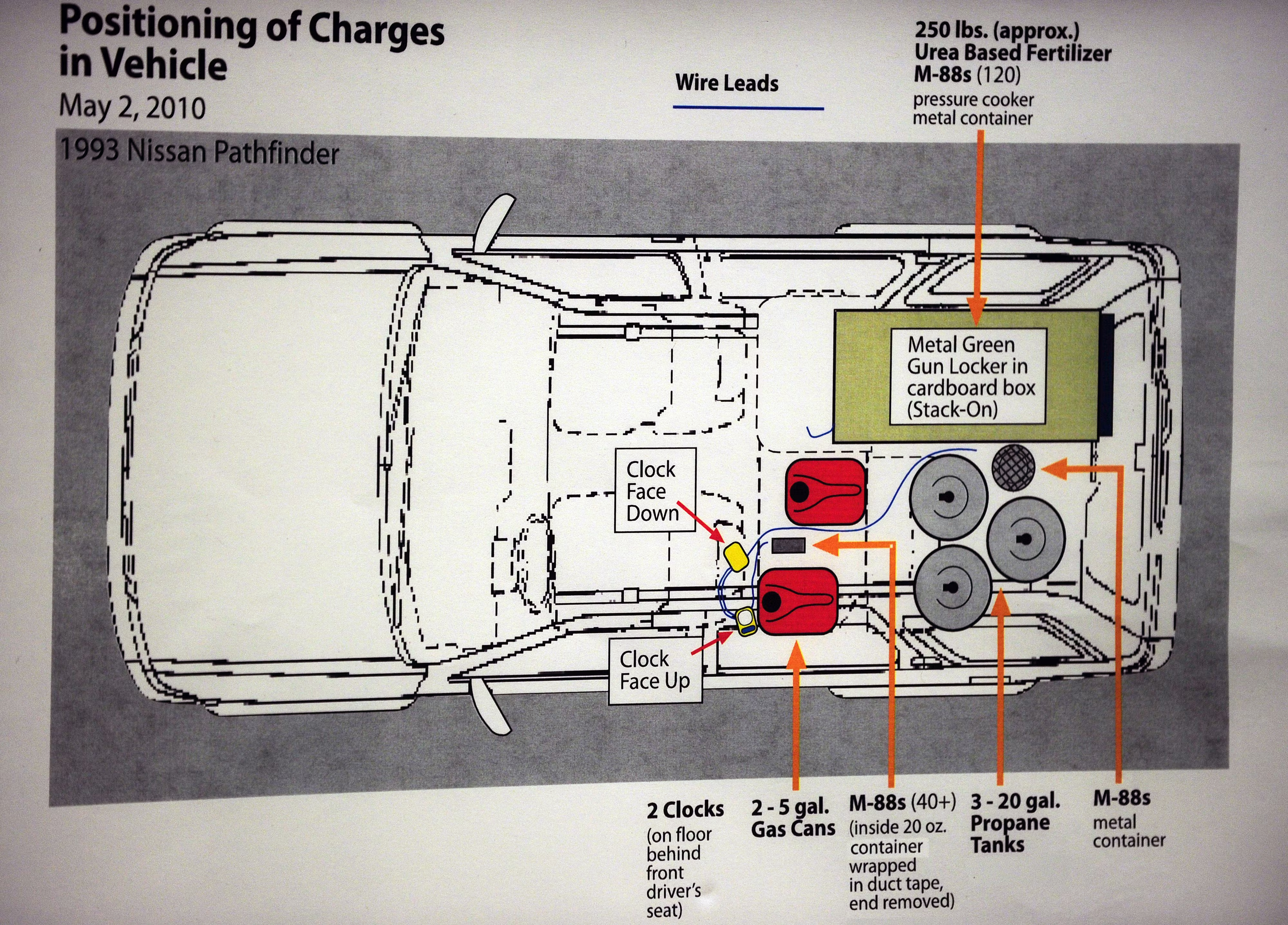
U.S. Justice Department diagram shows propane cylinders in improvised car bomb used in the attempted Times Square bombing

A propane bomb is a type of improvised explosive device which uses commercially available bottled gas cylinders, a kind of BLEVE. The devices have been used in terror attacks and school bombing plots.

== Description ==
Often propane bombs are crudely made, involving wiring a device into the propane tank(s) set to a timer or remote detonation. The expanding gas of the ignited propane bursts the shell of the tank and causes the explosion, similar to the fundamentals of a pressure cooker bomb or a pipe bomb.

== History ==
=== 1980–1999 ===
The 1983 Beirut barracks bombings killed 305 U.S. and French peacekeepers during the Lebanese Civil War with two truck bombs. The explosive mechanism was a gas-enhanced device consisting of compressed butane in canisters employed with Pentaerythritol tetranitrate to create a fuel-air explosive. The bomb was carried on a layer of concrete covered with a slab of marble to direct the blast upward. Despite the lack of sophistication and wide availability of its component parts, a gas-enhanced device can be a lethal weapon. These devices were similar to fuel-air or thermobaric weapons, explaining the large blast and damage.

In 1994, Hamas claimed responsibility for a car in Israel packed with nails and propane gas that exploded, killing the driver and seven people at a bus stop.

During the Columbine High School massacre, Harris and Klebold planted two 20-pound (9.1 kg) propane bombs in the school cafeteria. The plan was to kill as many students as possible in the explosions and to shoot down survivors when they attempt to flee. Both bombs failed to detonate, so the two students opened fire anyway, killing 12 students and 1 teacher, and injuring 21 others before both committing suicide. Another 20-pound (9.1 kg) propane bomb was found south of the school, presumably as a diversionary device for the police. Other propane tanks were found in their cars, for use as car bombs.

=== 2000–2009 ===
The Ghriba synagogue bombing involved a truck loaded with propane tanks detonating with its driver outside a Jewish synagogue in Tunisia, killing 16 and wounding 26. The attack was funded by al-Qaeda, organised by Khalid Sheikh Mohammed.

During the 2007 Glasgow International Airport attack, a Jeep Cherokee loaded with propane tanks crashed into the entrance of the Glasgow International Airport. The attackers appear to have been Muslims unaffiliated with any organization who were disgruntled about the war on terror taking place in the Middle East.

=== 2010–present ===
The 2010 Times Square car bombing attempt was an attempted terrorist attack using propane tanks in an improvised car bomb. The perpetrator Faisal Shahzad admitted that he had trained at a Pakistani terrorist training camp prior to the attack, and said he wanted revenge against the United States for drone strikes in Pakistan.

The 2012 Brindisi school bombing claimed the life of one 16-year-old female student and injured five others. It was originally blamed on the Mafia, but the confessing bomber revealed no convincing motive.

During November 2012, in Vancouver, a propane bomb was found on an elevated SkyTrain track, along with a second device. A passenger had spotted a red canister on the track which looked like small propane tanks with straps and wires. Canisters the size of a fire extinguisher were attached to an explosive device.

James Lee, armed with two starting pistols, a pipe bomb, four propane tanks and an oxygen tank, took three people hostage during the Discovery Communications headquarters hostage crisis, but Lee was shot dead by police. Lee's motive was believed to have been grounded in environmental activism.

In 2016, a French Muslim teenager was arrested after attempting to ignite propane tanks in her car outside Notre Dame Cathedral in Paris.

In 2017, an Allah-Las concert in Rotterdam was canceled after Spanish police, investigating the Barcelona attacks, tipped off Dutch police of a plan to bomb the concert. A white van containing 100 butane canisters was found near the concert.

In 2018 in Melbourne, Australia, a Somali terrorist ignited propane tanks in his car before stabbing three civilians and attempting to kill police officers.
