= Abd al-Aziz al-Ghumari =

Moroccan Muslim scholar (1920–1997)

Personal life
- Born: November 1920 Tangier, Morocco
- Died: November 6, 1997 (aged 76–77) Tangier

Religious life
- Religion: Islam
- Movement: Ghumari

Muslim leader
- Influenced by: Mahmoud Imam, Abdul Muti Sharshimi, Muhammad Nasiruddin al-Albani
- Influenced: Hassan al-Kattani

Abd al-Aziz bin Muhammad al-Ghumari (Arabic: عبد العزيز بن محمد الغماري; November 1920 in Tangier – November 6, 1997, in Tangier) was a Muslim scholar from Morocco.

== Career ==
He started his early education in Tangier and traveled to Cairo and was a student of Azhari scholars such as Mahmoud Imam and Abdul Muti Sharshimi. Among his works are the books Mujam al-Shuyukh and Fath al Aziz Bi Asanid Sayyid Abd al-Aziz. He wrote several articles in the Khadra and al-Balagh newspaper in Tangier and al-Islam magazine in Cairo. al-Ghumari was famous for his intellectual sparring with fellow hadith scholar Muhammad Nasiruddin al-Albani.

al-Ghumari used to teach the works of Ibn Abi Zayd al-Qayrawani and the book Sahih al-Bukhari, and he also has a biography in the Moroccan scholars' encyclopaedia. After a life of research on Hadith, al-Ghumari died in Tangier on Friday November 6, 1997, and was buried after a funeral in which he was mourned by many.

== Views ==
Although al-Ghumari studied in a Sunni Islamic School, he was highly skeptical about accepted Sunni positions and came up with views that were unpopular with his teachers in the al-Azhar University and he used to adopt views based on his research even if they were outside the fold of Ahl al-Sunnah wal-Jamah. He despised many esteemed individuals, including Khatib al-Baghdadi, Abu Nuaym, ibn Khuzayma, ibn Hajar al-Haytami, and especially ibn al-Jawzi, who he declared a non-person who's writings deserve to be trashed as they are worthless. He sharply criticised and slandered those who had views that were different to his.

Among such views are the following:

- Unlike in the Sunni-accepted position where all the companions of Muhammad are venerated, Ghumari used to mention 6 of the companions without venerating them because they fought against Ali.
- The celebration of Mawlid an-Nabi is, according to al-Ghumari, an obligation even though the Islamic society customs nor the religion of Islam do not recognize celebrating Mawlid an-Nabi as an obligation.
- He disagreed with the Sunni position on the supremacy of Abu Bakr al-Siddiq over all people who came after Muhammad, and held Ali to be superior to Uthman ibn Affan, Umar ibn al-Khattab, and Abu Bakr al-Siddiq.
- The Ash'aris are ignoramuses, and the opposition and condemnation of the Mu'tazila, Islamic philosophers and other rational Islamic theologians by the Salaf al-Salihin included the Ash'aris as well. al-Ghumari labelled the prominent Ashari scholar al-Subki as mentally ill, and another, ibn Hajar al-Haytami, as an ignoramus and a hypocrite.
- Imam Zahid al-Kawthari was a fanatic and an enemy of the scholars of Islam, except for those who followed his group of Hanafis. He derogatorily labelled the aforementioned group of Hanafis as the worshippers of Abu Hanifa.
- Shah Waliullah Dehlavi, an ardent opposer of the view of the supremacy of Ali over Uthman ibn Affan, Umar ibn al-Khattab, and Abu Bakr al-Siddiq, was a "Walialshaytan" (friend of the Devil).
- Shaykh Ahmad al-Tijani was not an Islamic Saint, rather he was not even a Muslim, and al-Ghumari went on as far to declare that he was worse than the Dajjal (Antichirst).
