= Hammam al-Sabaghine =

- حمام الصباغين

General information
- Location: Tlemcen

Hammam al-Sabaghine, or Hammam Sidi Belhassan al-Ghoumari (Arabic: حمام الصباغين، حمام سيدي بلحسن الغماري) It is a historic hammam in Tlemcen, Algeria, possibly built during the Almoravid rule.

== See also ==
- Hammam
- Tlemcen
