= Moroccan Islamic Combatant Group =

Group linked to the 2004 Madrid train bombing

- Dates active: 1998–2013
- Dissolved: circa 2013
- Active regions: Morocco, Algeria, Spain, Western Europe, Afghanistan, Iraq, Syria, Canada, Brazil
- Ideology: Salafi jihadism
- Wars: the Global War on Terrorism

The Moroccan Islamic Combatant Group, known by the French acronym GICM (Groupe Islamique Combattant Marocain), was a Sunni Islamist militant organization that operated in Morocco, North Africa, and Western Europe. The organization's objective was to establish an Islamic government in Morocco.

GICM was established in 1998 after Arab Afghan veteran fighters, who had fought alongside the Afghan Mujahideen, returned to Morocco with the objective of forming a militant organization. GICM and its associated members have been linked to the 2003 Casablanca bombings and the 2004 Madrid train bombings. A major crackdown against the organization's numerous cells in Europe is thought to have since significantly damaged the GICM's capabilities. By 2013, the group had become defunct, with the United States no longer considering it a functional organization.

== History ==
=== Background ===
The GICM was founded in the 1990s by Moroccan recruits from al-Qaeda training camps in Afghanistan and former Mujahideen veterans from the Soviet–Afghan War. Formed as a splinter group of the Harakat al-Islamiya al-Maghrebiya al-Mukatila (HASM) and Shabiba al-Islamiya groups, the GICM's stated goal was to establish an Islamic state in Morocco. The group gained its finances from criminal activities such as robberies, extortions, document forgery, illegal drug trade and arms trafficking through North Africa and Europe. One early cell affiliated with the group was responsible for killing two Spanish tourists at the Atlas Asni Hotel in Marrakesh in August 1994. The ideological leader of the group was Ahmed Rafiki (a.k.a. Abou Hodeifa), who was responsible for organizing Moroccan fighters in Afghanistan.

=== Attacks linked to GICM ===
Along with other Al-Qaeda affiliates, GICM was banned worldwide by the UN 1267 Committee in the aftermath of the September 11 attacks in 2001. The group was later linked to several terrorist attacks. In 2003 twelve suicide bombers from the associated group Salafia Jihadia were responsible for coordinated suicide bombings in Casablanca that killed 33 people. At least eight of the people convicted after the bombings were accused of being members of the GICM. Noureddine Nafia, an important early leader of the group was sentenced to 20 years in prison, and Saad Houssaini, the group's suspected military committee chief (arrested in 2007) was sentenced to 15 years.

A year after the Casablanca bombings, the GICM became the principal suspect after the 2004 Madrid train bombings that killed 191 people and wounded over 2,000. A cell linked to the attacks was affiliated with the GICM through Youssef Belhadj and Hassan el-Haski, who were based in Belgium. A main perpetrator, Jamal Zougam had met GICM leaders including Mohammed al-Guerbouzi (a.k.a. Abou Issa) in the United Kingdom, and Abdelaziz Benyaich in Morocco.

The group has also been linked to the 2007 Casablanca bombings. Also active with recruiting jihadist fighters to Iraq, the GICM has been responsible for attacks including at least one suicide bombing against the Multi-National Force – Iraq.

== Activities and cells ==
A large part of the GICM's membership was drawn from the Moroccan diaspora in Western Europe, where it was involved in a number of terrorist plots. The organization in Europe is based in the United Kingdom, but has had numerous cells, including sleeper cells in Spain, Belgium, Italy, France, Denmark, Turkey, Egypt and the Netherlands.

The European organization is thought to have been led by British national Mohammed al-Guerbouzi, who in 2001 was arrested by Iranian authorities and extradited to the United Kingdom, and later sentenced in absentia to 20 years in prison in Morocco for his role in the 2003 Casablanca bombings. A Belgian cell led by Abdelkader Hakimi, Lahoussine el-Haski, Mostafa Louanani, and eight other men were convicted in 2006. Members of the GICM have also been arrested in Spain and France. Four members were arrested in the Canary Islands in December 2004, suspected of preparing to establish a new base for the group. The Catalonia-based Rabet and Nakcha groups, which recruited suicide bombers to Iraq were dismantled in 2005 and 2006. In Paris, thirteen people suspected of links to the GICM were arrested in 2004. The imam of a mosque in Varese, Italy suspected of raising money and recruiting for the GICM was extradited to Morocco in 2008. According to the Federal Police of Brazil, GICM is one of seven Islamic terrorist groups active in the country, and in the border area with Argentina and Paraguay. The group has also operated in Canada.

By 2010, most of the organization's leadership had reportedly been imprisoned or killed, although former cells and members at large were still considered a possible threat. Although not officially confirmed, according to some sources the group has joined Al-Qaeda in the Islamic Maghreb (AQIM). A cell with 27 members in Tétouan arrested in January 2007 had logistical and financial links to GICM and AQIM. Mohamed Moumou (aka Abu Qaswarah), second-in-command of Al-Qaida in Iraq was originally a key member of the GICM. Karim el-Mejjati, another founding leader of the group, was killed in 2005 after having become a leader of al-Qaeda in Saudi Arabia.

The group was removed from the United States' list of Foreign Terrorist Organizations in 2013, seemingly confirming its complete dissolution as an entity by that point.

== Foreign relations ==
=== Designation as a terrorist organization ===
Countries and organizations below have officially listed the Moroccan Islamic Combatant Group as a terrorist organization.

Country	Date	References
United Nations	10 October 2002	
United States	5 December 2002–28 May 2013	
United Kingdom	14 October 2005	
