= Oued Mellah =

River in Morocco

Coordinates: 33.7019°N 7.4036°W

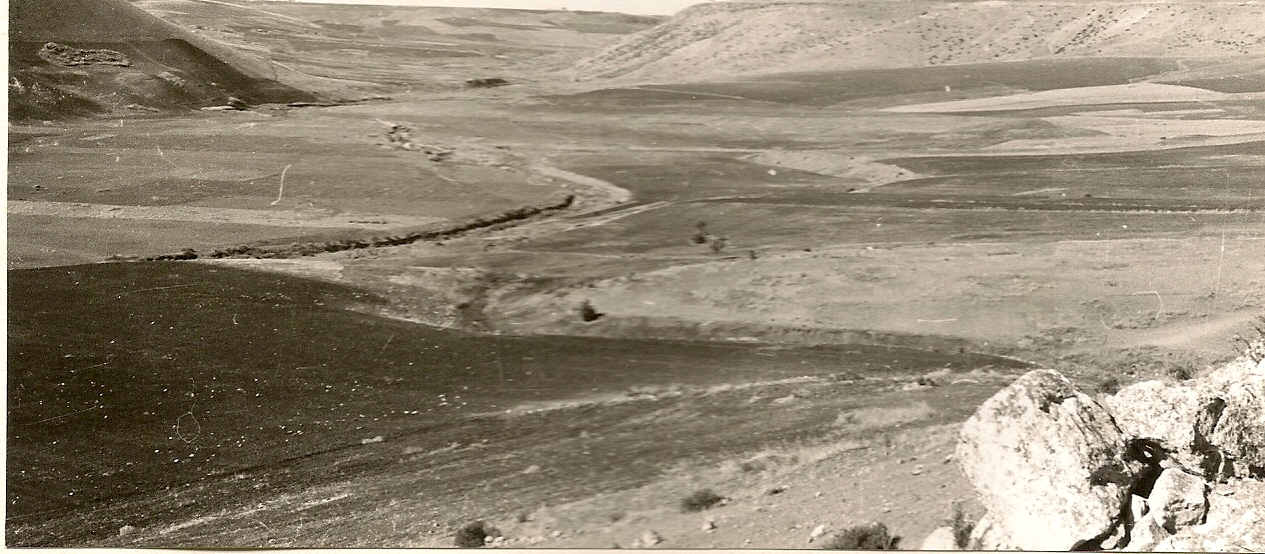
View of oued Mellah valley

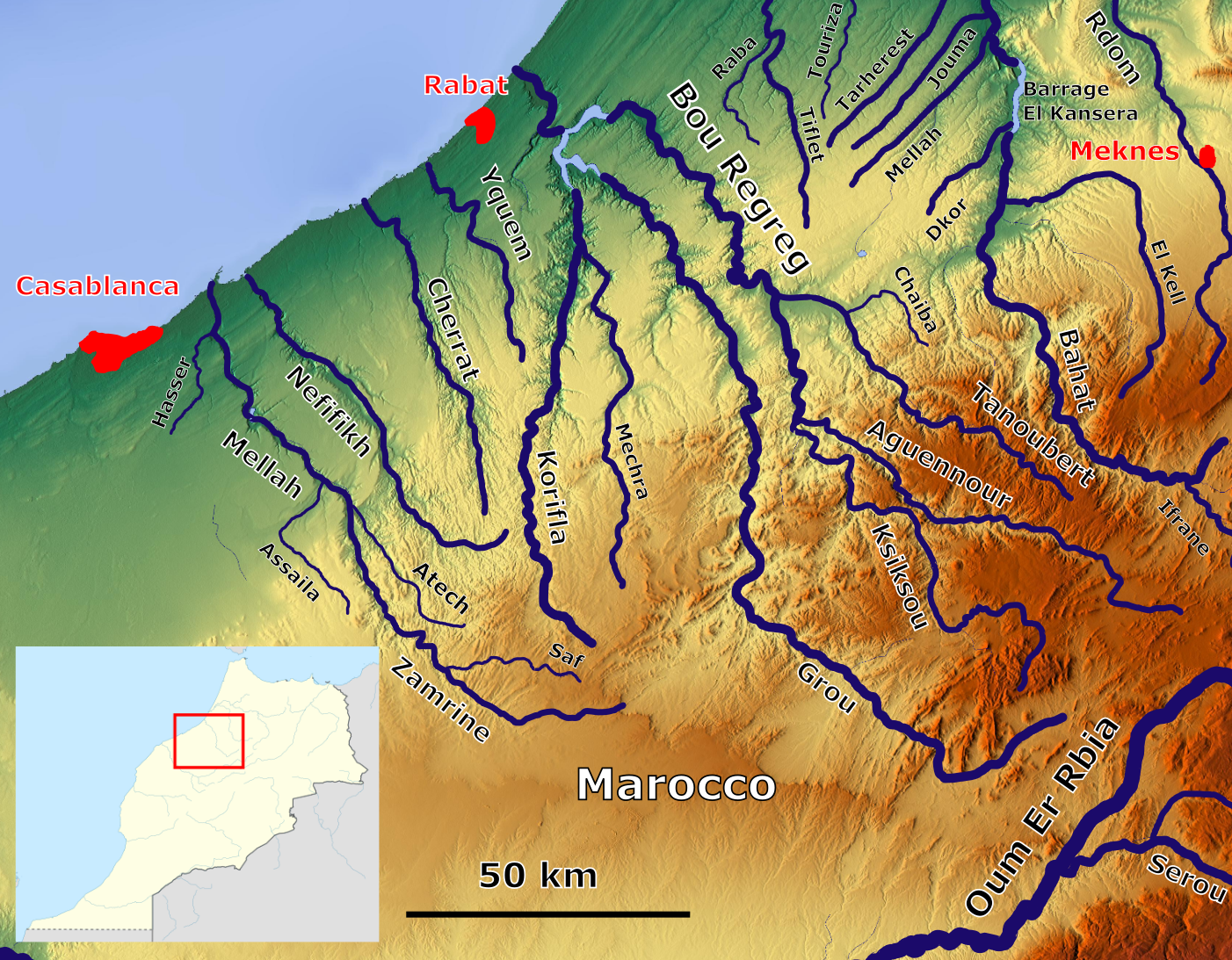
The rivers between Casablanca and Rabat with the Mellah (centre right)

Oued Mellah (in Moroccan Arabic oued means river and mellah or "maleh" means salty) is a seasonal creek in coastal Morocco. Oued Mellah is 160 km long and has an average flow of 1.46 m3/s. It takes source north of Khouribga at an elevation of 760 m and empties in the Atlantic Ocean in the city of Mohammedia. There are two dams over Oued Mellah; the first was built during the French Protectorate to provide water to Casablanca. A newer dam, named Tamesna, was built upstream near the city of Ben Ahmed.
