= Sidi Moumen =

Sidi Moumen سيدي مومن
- Arrondissement of Casablanca
- Interactive map of Sidi Moumen
- Coordinates: 33°35′41″N 7°31′37″W
- Country: Morocco
- Region: Casablanca-Settat
- District: Sidi Bernoussi

Population (2004)
  - Total: 289,253
- Time zone: UTC+0 (GMT)

Sidi Moumen (Arabic: سيدي مومن) is an arrondissement and northeastern suburb of Casablanca, in the Sidi Bernoussi district of the Casablanca-Settat region of Morocco. As of 2004 it had 289,253 inhabitants. It contains shanty towns from where the terrorists of the 2003 and 2007 Casablanca bombings came (mainly from the former Karian Thoma).
