= Charki Draiss =

Moroccan civil servant and politician

Cherki Drais

Minister-Delegate for the Interior
- Incumbent
- Assumed office 3 January 2012
- Monarch: Mohammed VI
- Prime Minister: Abdelilah Benkirane
- Preceded by: Saad Hassar (as Secretary of State)

Chief-Executive of the General Directorate for National Security (DGSN)
- In office September 2006 – January 2012
- Succeeded by: Bouchaib Rmail

Governor of Laayoune Province and Wali of the Region of Boujdor-Sakia-el-Hamra
- In office June 2005 – September 2006

Governor of Tetuan
- In office early 2005 – June 2005

Governor of Al Haouz province
- In office 1998–1999

Personal details
- Born: 1955 (age 70–71) Fkih Ben Saleh, Morocco
- Party: Independent
- Occupation: civil servant, politician

Charki Draiss (Arabic: الشرقي الضريس; born 1955 in Fkih Ben Saleh) is a Moroccan civil servant and politician. Since 3 January 2012, he holds the position of Minister-Delegate for the Interior in the cabinet of Abdelilah Benkirane.

== Career ==
Charki Draiss is a career civil servant and worked at the Ministry of Interior since he graduated with a degree in political science in 1977. He was Caid, Provincial then Regional Governor and was nominated in 2006 as the head the "DGSN" (French: Direction Générale de la Sécurité Intérieure; General Directorate of National Security), Morocco's chief body for internal security.

== See also ==
- Cabinet of Morocco
