= Sidi Bernoussi =

Sidi Bernoussi سيدي البرنوصي
- District of Casablanca
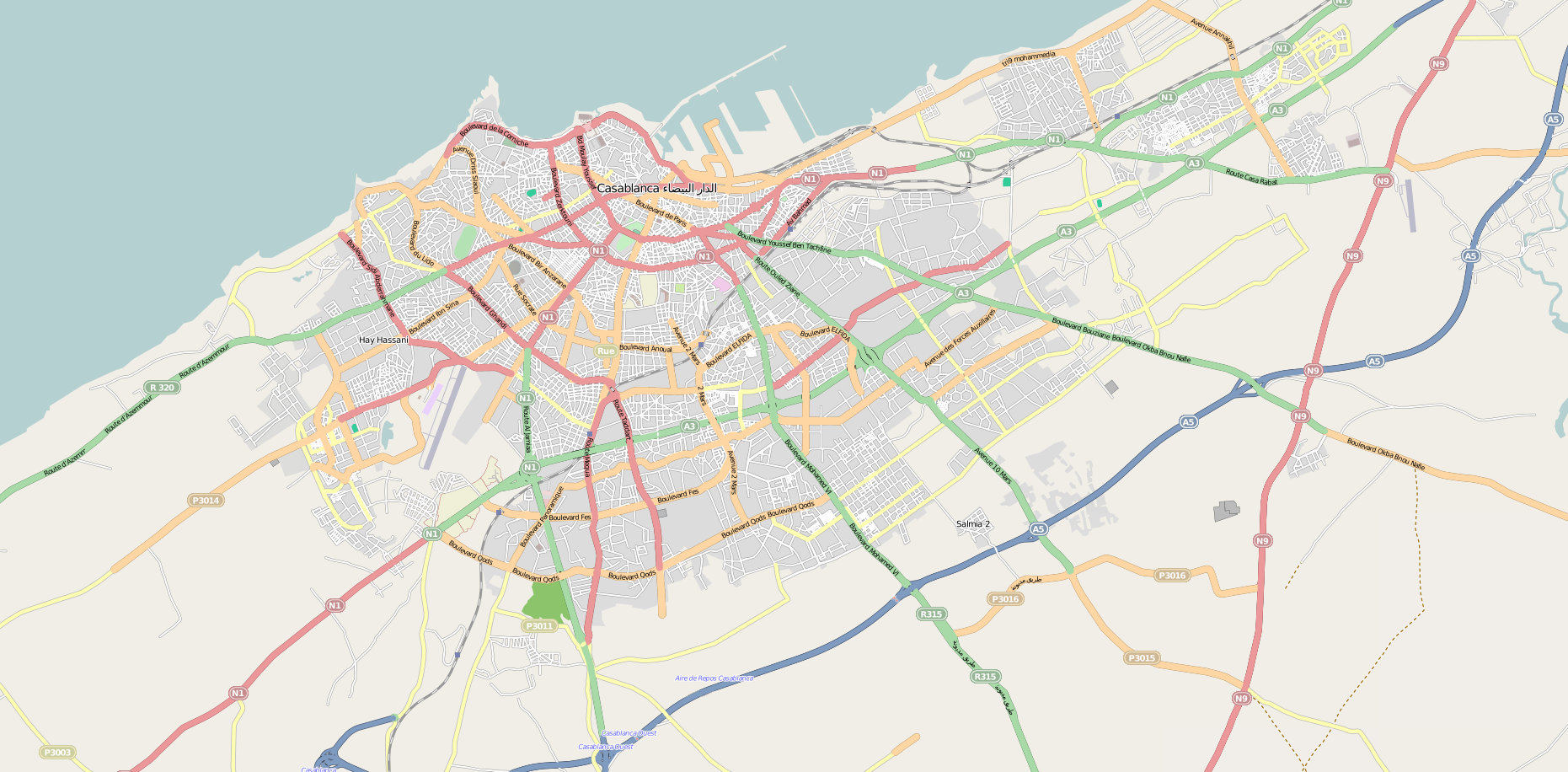
- Location in Greater Casablanca
- Coordinates: 33°36′26″N 7°30′19″W
- Country: Morocco
- Region: Casablanca-Settat

Area
  - Total: 38.59 km^{2} (14.90 sq mi)

Population (2004)
  - Total: 453,552
- Time zone: UTC+0 (WET)
  - Summer (DST): UTC+1 (WEST)

Sidi Bernoussi (Arabic: سيدي البرنوصي) is a district and suburb of northeastern Casablanca, in the Casablanca-Settat region of Morocco. The district covers an area of 38.59 square kilometres (14.9 square miles) and as of 2010 had 503,522 inhabitants. It contains the football club Rachad Bernoussi, established in 1961.

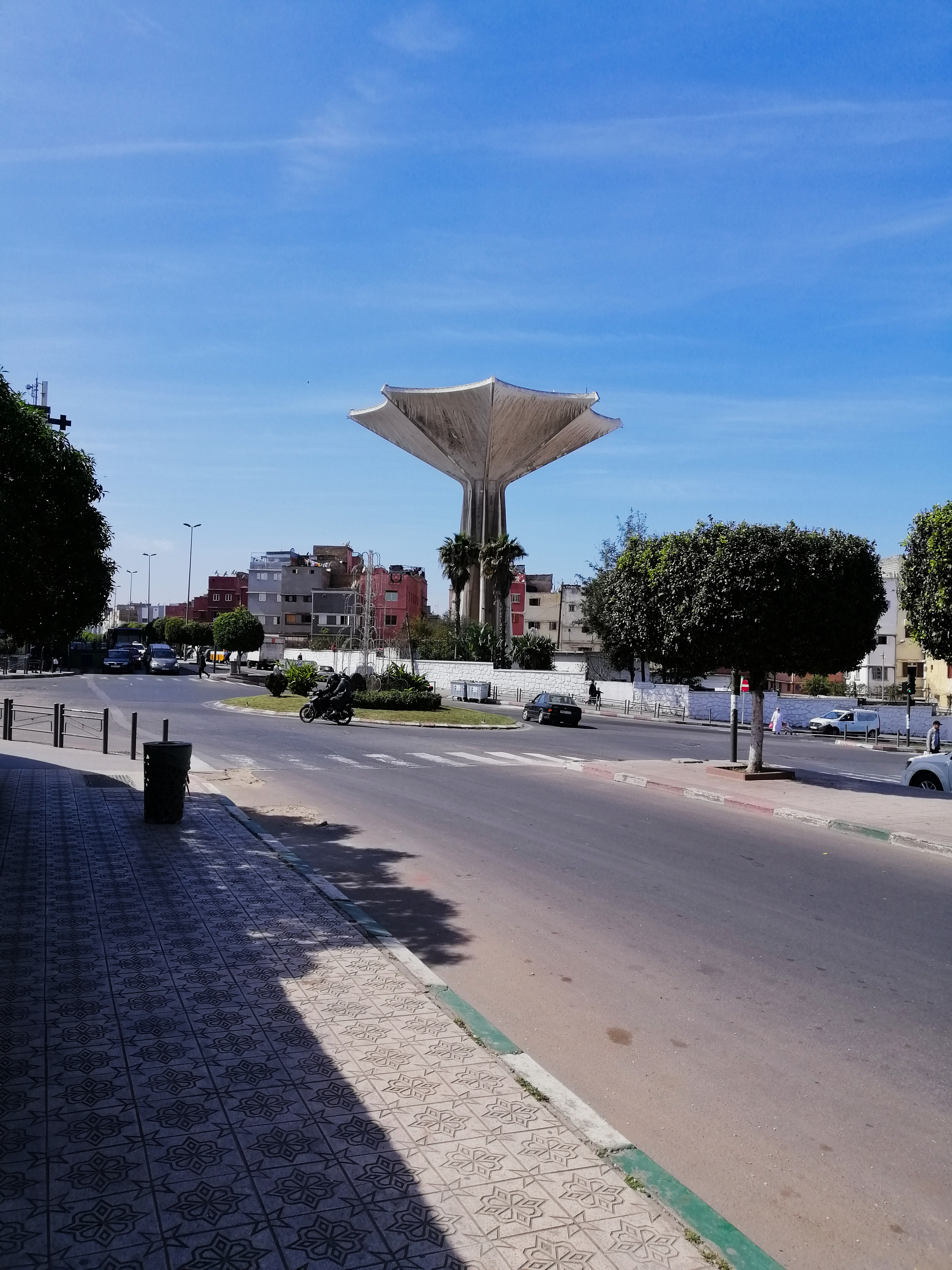
A photograph of Boulevard Souhaib Arroumi in Sidi Bernoussi, Casablanca, Morocco. It features a water tower that is considered a landmark of Sidi Bernoussi.

== Economy ==
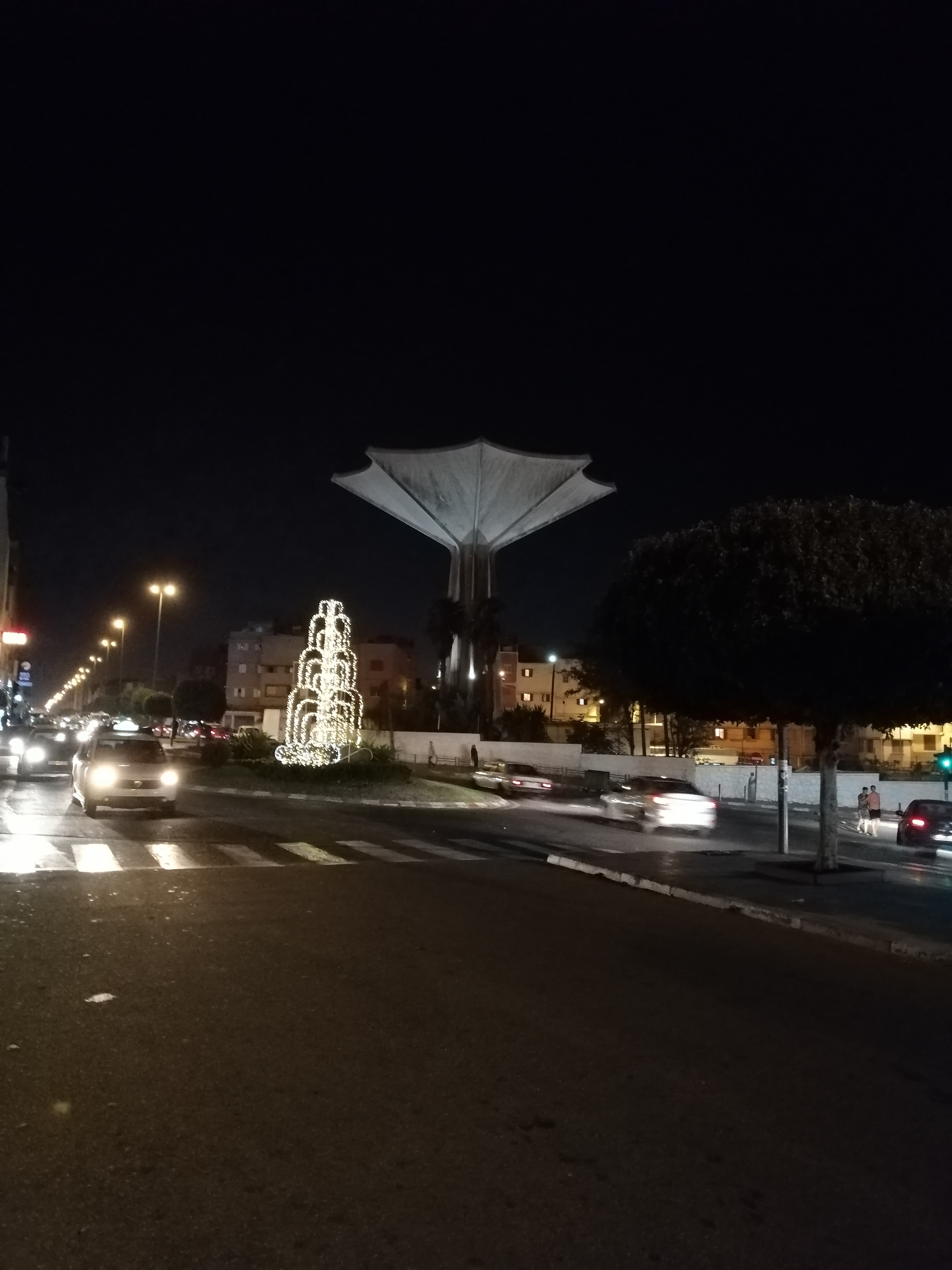
A night photograph of Boulevard Souhaib Arroumi in Sidi Bernoussi, Casablanca, Morocco. It features a water tower that is considered a landmark of Sidi Bernoussi.

Sidi Bernoussi is one of the first districts that has opted for Aswaq Namoudajia ( a kind of modernized souk that gathers informal street merchants). One of them is near Almoukhtar Essoussi High School, and another one is near Alfirdaous Mosque. The Renault subsidiary Somaca is headquartered in the district.

== Subdivisions ==
The district is divided into two arrondissements:

- Sidi Bernoussi (arrondissement)
- Sidi Moumen

== Notable people ==
  - Hicham BOUTIZLA
  - Mohammed Soulhi
  - Youssef Machti
  - Mohammed Najah
  - Jalil Mesbah
  - Youssef Safri
  - Bouchaib El Moubarki
  - Cheba Maria
  - Mounir Bahi
  - Asmaa Lamnawar
  - Mohammed Rabii
  - Hicham Louissi
