= 2007 Casablanca bombings =

Series of suicide bombings in Morocco in 2007

The 2007 Casablanca bombings refer to a series of suicide bombings in March and April 2007 in Casablanca, Morocco.

== March bombing ==
=== March 11 ===
2007 Casablanca bombing
- Location: Casablanca, Morocco
- Date: March 11, 2007; 22:00 (WET)
- Target: Internet cafe
- Attack type: suicide attack
- Deaths: 1 (one perpetrator)
- Injuries: 4 (including one perpetrator)
- Perpetrators: Abdelfattah Raydi (killed); Youssef Khoudri (Arrested)

There was a suicide bombing on March 11, 2007, in Casablanca, Morocco. The suicide bombers came from the shanty towns of Sidi Moumen, a poor suburb of Casablanca.

The bombing occurred at 22 hours local time inside an internet cafe. Two men were trying to log into an extremist Islamist website before the owner asked them not to. The two men refused and shortly after, the owner closed the door and threatened to call the police. The bombers asked the owner to open the door and to let them go but he refused. One of the two individuals, 23-year-old Abdelfattah Raydi who was carrying an explosive load hidden under his clothing detonated the bomb, which killed him and injured his companion and three others including the owner. The companion, identified later as 18-year-old Youssef Khoudri escaped with an eye injury and left for a nearby hospital, where he was later captured by the authorities.

The Director of General Affairs of the Grand Casablanca, Mokhtar Bekkali Kacemi declared to the media that the bombers "were probably getting ready to commit a criminal act...they wanted to receive instructions via Internet to execute their attacks elsewhere."

According to Assabah newspaper the real target had been Casablanca's police and paramilitary headquarters as well as some tourist sites.

== April bombings ==
April 2007 Casablanca bombings
- Location: Casablanca, Morocco
- Date: 10/14 April 2007
- Attack type: Raid, suicide bombings
- Deaths: 6 terrorists 1 police officer
- Injuries: 1
- Perpetrator: Islamists

=== April 10 ===
Following the March bombing, a major security operation against suspected Islamist militants resulted in three suspected suicide bombers blowing themselves up and a fourth being shot dead by police as he tried to detonate his device. One police officer died in one of the explosions. Officials said one of the three suspected militants who blew himself up during a police raid in Morocco is the brother of an internet cafe bomber.

=== April 14 ===
An additional two suicide bombers blew themselves up in Casablanca on April 14. One woman passer-by was injured in the blasts, which happened near the US consulate and its cultural centre.

== Sentencing ==
In October 2008, Morocco sentenced 45 people to 2 to 30 years in prison for their roles in a plot to attack targets in Casablanca, a plot related to the 2007 bombings.

== See also ==
- 2003 Casablanca bombings
