= Muhammad Abu Khubza =

Moroccan Imam (1932–2020)

Abu Uways
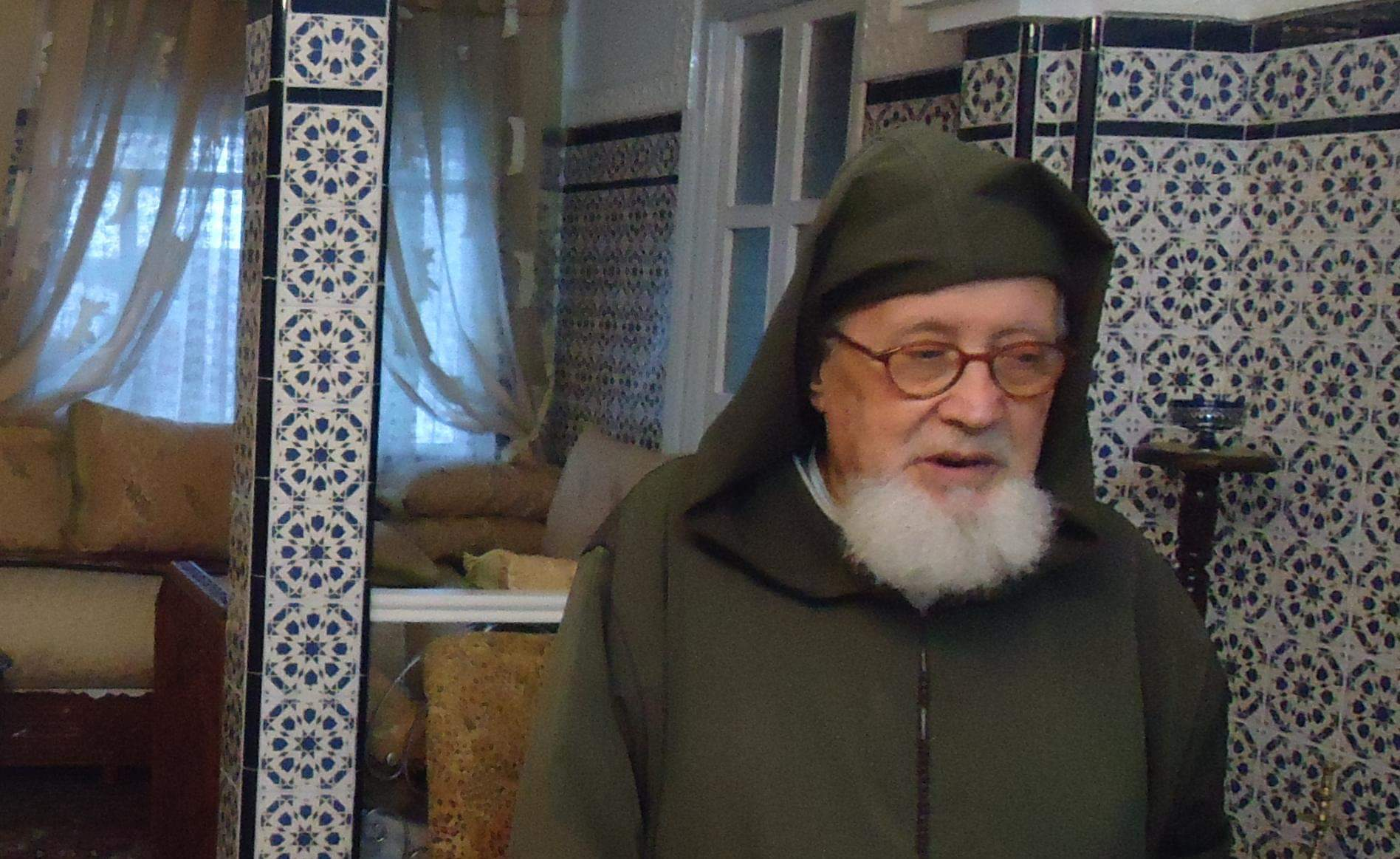

Personal life
- Born: Muhammad Abu Khubza al-Hasani; 30 July 1932 Tétouan, Morocco
- Died: 30 January 2020 (aged 87) Tetouan, Morocco

Religious life
- Religion: Islam
- Denomination: Sunni
- Jurisprudence: Zahiri
- Creed: Athari
- Movement: Salafism

Muslim leader
- Influenced by: Taqi al-Din al-Hilali

Abu Uways Muhammad Abu Khubza al-Hassani (Arabic: مُحَمَّد بن الأَمِين بُوخُبْزَة الْحسْنِيُّ; July 30, 1932 – January 30, 2020) was a Moroccan Muslim theologian, jurist, bibliographer and linguist. His name has variantly been spelled "Bukhabza," "Boukhabza," Bu Khabza," and "Bu Khubza."

== Life ==
Abu Khubza was born on the 26th of Rabi' al-awwal in the year 1351 according to the Islamic calendar, corresponding to the 30th of July in 1932 Gregorian.

== Works ==
Abu Khubza produced a detailed library catalog for the Tétouan branch of the Bibliothèque Générale et Archives, Morocco's national library.

=== Original works ===
- Fihris makhtutat khizana titwan. Tétouan: 1984. 2 vols. With al-Mahdi al-Daliru.

=== Edited works ===
- Ibn al-Arabi, Siraj al-muhtadin fi adab al-salihin. Tétouan: Manshurat Jam'iyyat al-Ba'th al-Islami, 1992.
- Tirmidhi, Aridat al-ahwadhi bi sharh sahih al-Tirmidhi. Beirut: Dar al-Kutub al-'Ilmiyya, 1997. 8 vols.
