= Royal Moroccan Gendarmerie =

Gendarmerie branch of Morocco's military

Royal Gendarmerie الدرك الملكي

Agency overview
- Formed: 29 April 1957

Jurisdictional structure
- Operations jurisdiction: Morocco
- Constituting instruments: Dahir No 1-57-979 of 29 April 1957; Dahir No 1-57-280 of 14 January 1958
- General nature: Gendarmerie

Operational structure
- Headquarters: Rabat, Morocco
- Elected officer responsible: Abdellatif Loudiyi, Minister Delegate to the Head of Government in charge of the administration of National Defense
- Agency executive: General Haramou, Commander
- Parent agency: Royal Moroccan Armed Forces

The Royal Moroccan Gendarmerie (Arabic: الدرك الملكي المغربي) is the national gendarmerie force of the Kingdom of Morocco, and comes under the joint-authority of the Minister Delegate to the Head of Government in charge of the administration of National Defense, Ministry of Interior and Ministry of Justice.

== History ==
During the period of the French protectorate in Morocco, the French national gendarmerie was tasked to maintain law and order in Morocco & Tunisia. The Moroccan Royal Gendarmerie was founded on 29 April 1957 by the late King Mohammed V following independence. A Dahir issued on 14 January 1958 further defined the principle and purpose of the Gendarmerie. This describes the Royal Moroccan Gendarmerie as a public force designed to guarantee public security and public order and the implementation of laws. Article 2 of the legislation attaches the Gendarmerie to the Royal Moroccan Armed Forces, then constituting a military force in its structure, administration and command forms. And its personnel consists of officers and NCOs. Structure of its functions has been determined by the two major different but complementary traditions. One of them has its roots in the history and culture of Morocco. The gendarmerie was born of the Moroccan administrative and political system which has ensured public security and maintenance of public order for centuries. The second tradition (Makhzen) is much newer.

== Duties ==
The Royal Moroccan Gendarmerie is a force of police tasked mainly to ensure public safety, maintain order and ensure law enforcement. Article 7 of the legislation stipulates the purpose of the gendarmerie is to ensure especially administrative, judicial and military policing activities directly and to help to the competent authorisations with the envisaged laws, which implies that the legislature has given great importance to policing duties.

Article 3 of the legislation further define responsible ministry on the gendarmerie roles, which are:

- the National Defence Administration especially on the subjects of organisation equipment and military judicial policing;
- the Ministry of Justice for the implementation of judicial policing; and,
- the Ministry of Interior on the subject of Common Administration Policing.

=== Judicial Police ===
The duties of the Royal Gendarmerie, in the field of judicial policing, have been determined by the Criminal Procedure Code of 1959. It performs all these duties under the administration of the royal prosecutor and control of the Court of Appeal. Duties consist of criminal investigation, evidence gathering, arresting criminals and execution of judge's orders. The personnel of the Royal Gendarmerie participates in the implementation Judicial Policing. The Royal Gendarmerie who acts with the characteristics of being a judicial oriented police officer according to the Court of Penal Proceedings, Detects and determines the violation of the laws as a judicial police; and as a police of public force, informs the royal prosecutor of crimes and offences over which they have no jurisdiction.

To struggle against the continuous increase of crime and its international aspects and, on the other hand, the increase of the texts and their complexity the Royal Gendarmerie is modernising its methods and equipment continuously and reinforcing its efficiency by evaluating technical and scientific policing and criminal data. With this aim, two laboratories, which are under the administration of senior researchers, were established.

=== Administrative Police ===
In regards to duties of the Royal Gendarmerie, in the field of administrative policing, determined of a set of regulations dedicated to the maintenance of public order, including serve as border guard. On this role, the gendarmerie is responsible to the Ministry of Interior. The article 3 of the legislation allow gendarmerie to assists other ministerial departments such as:

- Ministry of equipment, transport and logistics for traffic policing and protecting port and airport facilities.
- Ministry of agriculture, maritime fisheries, rural development and water and forests for prevention of illegal fishing control.

== Organization ==
The organization of Royal Moroccan Gendarmerie is consist of:

- The General Headquarters, which conducts the overall main duties of the force.
- Territorial Gendarmerie
  - 22 Regional Gendarmeries
  - 64 Companies of Gendarmerie
  - 322 posts of Gendarmerie
- Mobile Gendarmerie
- Air and Maritime Gendarmerie
- Specialized Units, such as Groupement de Sécurité et d'Intervention de la Gendarmerie Royale.

== Ranks ==
=== Officers ===
Rank group	General / flag officers			Senior officers				Junior officers
Royal Moroccan Gendarmerie
Royal Moroccan Gendarmerie	Général de corps d'armée	Général de division	Général de brigade	Colonel Major	Colonel	Lieutenant-Colonel	Commandant	Capitaine	Lieutenant	Sous-lieutenant

=== Enlisted ===
Rank group	Senior NCOs					Junior NCOs	Enlisted
Royal Moroccan Gendarmerie
Royal Moroccan Gendarmerie	Adjudant-chef	Adjudant	Sergent-major	Sergent-chef	Sergent

== Inventory ==
- Small arms & Vehicles

Pistols	SMG's:	Assault Rifles:	Sniper Rifles:	Shotguns:
Heckler & Koch MP5	SAR 21	FR F1	Benelli M4	
Heckler & Koch VP70	FN P90	M16 rifle	PGM 338	SPAS-12
Heckler & Koch HK4	Uzi	M4 carbine	M24 Sniper Weapon System	SPAS-15
Walther PPK	MAT-49	FN FAL		Valtro PM-5
Beretta 92	Ingram MAC-10	HK G36		
MAB PA-15	Heckler & Koch UMP	FN2000		
MAC Mle 1950		Steyr AUG		
SIG Sauer P226				
SIG Sauer P228				
Colt Detective Special				
Smith & Wesson Model 10				
Heckler & Koch USP				
Heckler & Koch Mark 23				

- Vehicles:
  - MRAP(unknown model/type)
  - Chevrolet Suburban

=== Aircraft ===
Aircraft	Origin	Type	Variant	In service	Notes
Helicopters
SA 315B Lama	France	liaison		7	
SA342 Gazelle	France	observation		5	
Eurocopter Fennec	France	utility / observation		6	
Eurocopter EC135	Germany	utility / MEDIVAC		3	
Eurocopter EC145	Germany	utility / MEDIVAC		3	
SA 330 Puma	France	utility / aerial firefighting	C/F/H	7	
Sikorsky S-70	United States	utility / transport	S-70A-26	2	
Eurocopter AS332	France	VIP	AS332/EC225	2	one of which is an EC225 Super Puma
Sikorsky S-92	United States	utility / transport	Sikorsky S-92	2	

== International co-operation ==
Since its foundation, the Royal Gendarmerie has developed efficient mutual co-operation basis with the other similar organizations and also joined in the FIEP organization in 1999 which provides a framework for the improvement of mutual relations between organizations and the maintenance of security in the region.

== See also ==
- List of gendarmeries
