= Aïda Ould Tamek =

Moroccan colonel major

pasha of the Zag province
- In office 1976–1980

Personal details
- Born: 1910 Lhtiba, Lhmada region, Morocco
- Died: January 5, 2015 (aged 104–105) Assa, Morocco

Military service
- Allegiance: Morocco
- Branch/service: Moroccan Army of Liberation; Royal Moroccan Army
- Years of service: 1955–2005
- Rank: Colonel Major

Aïda (or Ida) Ould Tamek (1910 – January 6, 2015) was a Moroccan colonel major and a member of the Moroccan Army of Liberation.

== Biography ==
Aïda was born in 1910 in the Lhtiba area in Lhmada region, and moved to the city of Assa. He was from the Aït Oussa tribe of the Tekna tribal confederation. In 1955, he joined the 7th District of the Moroccan Army of Liberation as an officer, before becoming its leader. He Joined the ranks of the Royal Moroccan Armed Forces in 1960. In 1963, he participated in the Sand War and became an actual officer in the Royal Army in 1974, where he was the head of a military unit consisting of the Saharan tribes. In 1976, he was appointed as pasha of the Zag province, a post he held until 1980.

He participated in many battles in the Sahara, including the battle of Marguala and the first and second Battle of Oum El Achar, the battle of Icht near Fam El Hisn, the battle of Takel in the regions of Mauritania, the Battle of Rghioua and the battle of Saguia el-Hamra. He also participated in other battles in the Ait Baamran, including the general attack on all Spanish army camps, and among these attacks the Tilouine camp attack.

In the 1970s and 1980s, he was one of the main recruiters of Saharawis for the Royal Moroccan army.

After getting promoted to the rank of Colonel by the king Hassan II, he was granted the rank of Colonel Major by King Mohammed VI in 2005.

Aïda Ould Tamek died in Assa at the age of one hundred five on January 6, 2015.
