= Military ranks of Morocco =

The Military ranks of Morocco are the military insignia used by the Royal Moroccan Armed Forces. Being a former protectorate of France, Morocco shares a rank structure similar to that of France.

== Commissioned officer ranks ==
The rank insignia of commissioned officers.

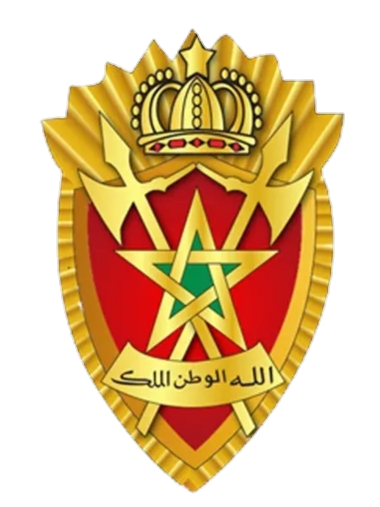
Rank group	General / flag officers					Senior officers				Junior officers
Royal Moroccan Army
Royal Moroccan Army	Maréchal	Général d'armée	Général de corps d'armée	Général de division	Général de brigade	Colonel-major	Colonel	Lieutenant-colonel	Commandant	Capitaine	Lieutenant	Sous-lieutenant
Royal Moroccan Navy
Royal Moroccan Navy		Amiral	Vice-amiral d'escadre	Vice-amiral	Contre-amiral	Capitaine de vaisseau-major	Capitaine de vaisseau	Capitaine de frégate	Capitaine de corvette	Lieutenant de vaisseau	Enseigne de vaisseau de 1^{re} classe	Enseigne de vaisseau de 2^{e} classe
Royal Moroccan Air Force
Royal Moroccan Air Force		Général d'armée aerienne	Général de corps aerienne	Général de division aerienne	Général de brigade aerienne	Colonel major	Colonel	Lieutenant-colonel	Commandant	Capitaine	Lieutenant	Sous-lieutenant
Royal Moroccan Gendarmerie
Royal Moroccan Gendarmerie			Général de corps d'armée	Général de division	Général de brigade	Colonel Major	Colonel	Lieutenant-Colonel	Commandant	Capitaine	Lieutenant	Sous-lieutenant
Moroccan Royal Guard
Moroccan Royal Guard					Général de brigade	Colonel Major	Colonel	Lieutenant-Colonel	Commandant	Capitaine	Lieutenant	Sous-lieutenant
Moroccan Auxiliary Forces
Moroccan Auxiliary Forces							Excellent First Class Inspector	Excellent Inspector of the Second Class	Excellent Inspector of the Third Class	First Class Inspector	Second Class Inspector	Third-class inspector

=== Student officer ranks ===
Rank group	Student officer
Royal Moroccan Army
Royal Moroccan Army	Aspirant	Eleve Officier
Royal Moroccan Gendarmerie
Royal Moroccan Gendarmerie	Aspirant	Eleve Officier
Moroccan Royal Guard
Moroccan Royal Guard	Aspirant	Eleve Officier

== Other ranks ==
The rank insignia of non-commissioned officers and enlisted personnel.

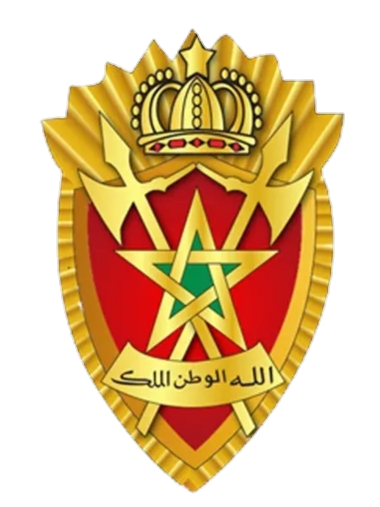
Rank group	Senior NCOs						Junior NCOs		Enlisted
Royal Moroccan Army
Royal Moroccan Army	Adjudant-chef	Adjudant	Sergent-major	Sergent-chef		Sergent	Caporal-chef	Caporal	Soldat de première classe	Soldat de deuxième classe
Royal Moroccan Navy										No insignia
Royal Moroccan Navy	Maître principal	Premier maître	Maître	Second-maître de 1^{ère} classe		Second-maître de 2^{ème} classe	Quartier-maître de 1^{ère} classe	Quartier-maître de 2^{ème} classe	Matelot de 1^{ère} classe	Matelot
Royal Moroccan Air Force										No insignia
Royal Moroccan Air Force	Adjudant-chef	Adjudant	Sergent-major	Sergent-chef		Sergent	Caporal-chef	Caporal	Soldat de première classe	Soldat de deuxième classe
Royal Moroccan Gendarmerie
Royal Moroccan Gendarmerie	Adjudant-chef	Adjudant	Sergent-major	Sergent-chef		Sergent
Moroccan Royal Guard
Moroccan Royal Guard	Adjudant-chef	Adjudant	Sergent-major	Sergent-chef		Sergent	Caporal-chef	Caporal	Soldat de première classe	Soldat de deuxième classe
Moroccan Auxiliary Forces
Moroccan Auxiliary Forces	Excellent second class moussaid (assistant)	Excellent first class Moussaid (assistant)	Second class Moussaid (assistant)		First class Moussaid (assistant)	Brigadier-chef	Brigadier	Mokhazeni
