= Royal Moroccan Armed Forces =

Combined military forces of Morocco

- القوات المسلحة الملكية المغربية
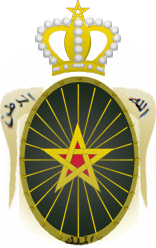
- Motto: "الله، الوطن، الملك" "God, Homeland, King"
- Founded: 1088; 938 years
- Current form: 1956; 70 years ago
- Service branches: Royal Moroccan Army; Royal Moroccan Navy; Royal Moroccan Air Force; Moroccan Royal Guard; Royal Moroccan Gendarmerie
- Headquarters: Rabat
- Website: tajnid.ma (recruitment) revue.far.ma (official magazine)

Leadership
- Supreme Commander: Mohammed VI
- Prime Minister: Fatima Ezzahra El Mansouri
- Minister of Defense: Abdellatif Loudiyi
- Inspector General: Lieutenant General Mohammed Berrid

Personnel
- Military age: 18
- Conscription: Yes
- Active personnel: 196,000
- Reserve personnel: 150,000

Expenditure
- Budget: 119.766 billion MAD $$15.7billion (2026)
- Percent of GDP: 8.5% (2026)

Industry
- Foreign suppliers: United States; United Kingdom; Israel; France; Italy; China; Other suppliers: Switzerland; Singapore; European Union; Ukraine; Spain; India; Turkey; Brazil; Australia; Canada

Related articles
- History: Military history of Morocco; Ifni War; Rif revolt Sand War; Six-Day War; October War; Western Sahara War; Gulf War; Insurgency in the Maghreb; Intervention in Yemen; Western Saharan clashes
- Ranks: Military ranks of Morocco

The Royal Moroccan Armed Forces (FAR; Arabic: القوات المسلحة الملكية المغربية, romanized: Al-Quwwat al-Musallaha al-Malakiyah al-Maghribiyah) are the military forces of Morocco. They consist of the Army, the Navy, the Air Force, the Royal Gendarmerie, and the Royal Guard.

The Royal Moroccan Armed Forces have experience in counter-insurgency, desert warfare and combined air-land operations. Further experience has come from participating in peace-keeping operations.

== History ==
The oldest "Moroccan" military forces are those of the Mauri Berber Kingdoms from around 225 BCE. The Moroccan army has existed continuously since 1088 during the rise of the Almoravid Empire in the 11th century. During the protectorates period (1912–1955), large numbers of Moroccans were recruited for service in the Goumiers and Regulars regiments of the Moroccan Army of Morocco (French: Armée de Maroc). Many served during World War I. During World War II more than 500,000 Moroccan troops (including goumier auxiliaries) served with the Allied forces in North Africa, Italy, France, Germany and Austria. The two world conflicts saw Moroccan units earning the nickname of "Todesschwalben" (death swallows) by German soldiers as they showed particular toughness on the battlefield. After the end of World War II, Moroccan troops formed part of the French Far East Expeditionary Corps engaged in the First Indochina War from 1946 to 1954.

The Spanish Army also made extensive use of Moroccan troops recruited in the Spanish Protectorate, during both the Rif War of 1921–26 and the Spanish Civil War of 1936–39. Moroccan Regulares, together with the Spanish Legion, made up Spain's elite Spanish Army of Africa. A paramilitary gendarmerie, known as the "Mehal-la Jalifianas" and modelled on the French goumieres, was employed within the Spanish Zone.

The Royal Armed Forces were created on 14 May 1956, after the Franco-Spanish Protectorate was dissolved in 1955. 140,000 Moroccan personnel from the French protectoral army and 90,000 from the Spanish protectoral army Forces transferred into the newly formed armed forces, this number was augmented by approximately 15,000 former guerrillas from the "Army of Liberation", About 2,000 French and Spanish officers and NCOs remained in Morocco on short term contracts until the training programs at the military academies of St-Cyr, Toledo and Dar al Bayda produced sufficient numbers of Moroccan commissioned officers. Four years later, the Royal Moroccan Navy was established in 1960.

The Moroccan military's first engagement as an independent country in the 20th century was the Ifni War, followed by the Rif revolt, and then the border war of 1963 with Algeria, In the early 1960s, Moroccan troops were sent to the Congo as part of the first multifunctional UN peacekeeping operation ONUC, The Royal Moroccan Armed Forces fought on the Golan front during the Yom Kippur War of 1973 (mostly in the battle for Quneitra) and intervened decisively in the 1977 conflict known as Shaba I to save Zaire's regime. After Shaba II, Morocco was part of the Inter-African Force deployed on the Zaire border, contributing about 1,500 troops. The Royal Moroccan Armed Forces also took a symbolic part in the Gulf War among other Arab armies.

Between 1975 and 1991, the Moroccan Armed Forces fought a 16-year war against the POLISARIO, an Algerian backed rebel national liberation movement seeking the independence of Western Sahara from Morocco. From the mid-1980s on, Morocco largely managed to keep POLISARIO troops at bay by building a huge sand wall, staffed by an army roughly the same size as the entire Sahrawi population, enclosing the Southern Provinces within it. The enclosure contained most of the economically useful parts of Western Sahara, including Bou Craa, El-Aaiun, and Smara. The Moroccan army destroyed all the posts created by the Polisario and won decisively the majority of battles, but artillery strikes and sniping attacks by the guerrillas continued, and Morocco was economically and politically strained by the war.

In the 1990s, Moroccan troops went to Angola with the three UN Angola Verifications Missions, UNAVEM I, UNAVEM II, and UNAVEM III. They were also in Somalia, with UNOSOM I, the U.S.-led Unified Task Force (UNITAF), known by its U.S. codename of 'Restore Hope' and the follow-on UNOSOM II, They saw fighting during the Battle of Mogadishu to rescue a U.S. anti-militia assault force. Other peace support involvement during the 1990s included United Nations Transitional Authority in Cambodia (UNTAC) in Cambodia, and the missions in the former Yugoslavia: IFOR, SFOR, and KFOR.

On 14 July 1999, the Moroccan Armed Forces took part in the Bastille Day parade on the Champs-Élysées, which was exceptional for a non-French armed forces, at the invitation of then French President Jacques Chirac.

== Branches ==
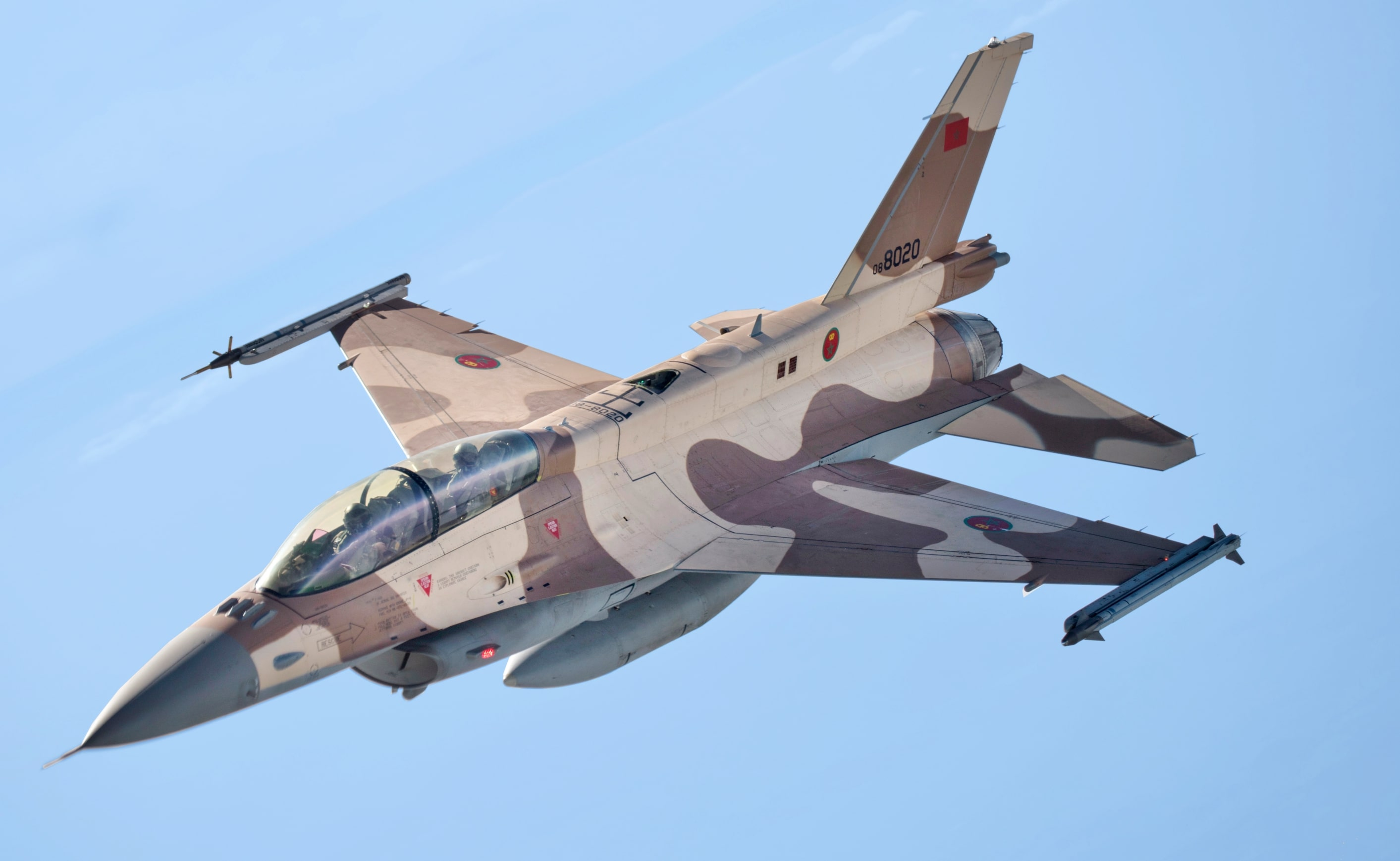
A Moroccan F-16 fighter

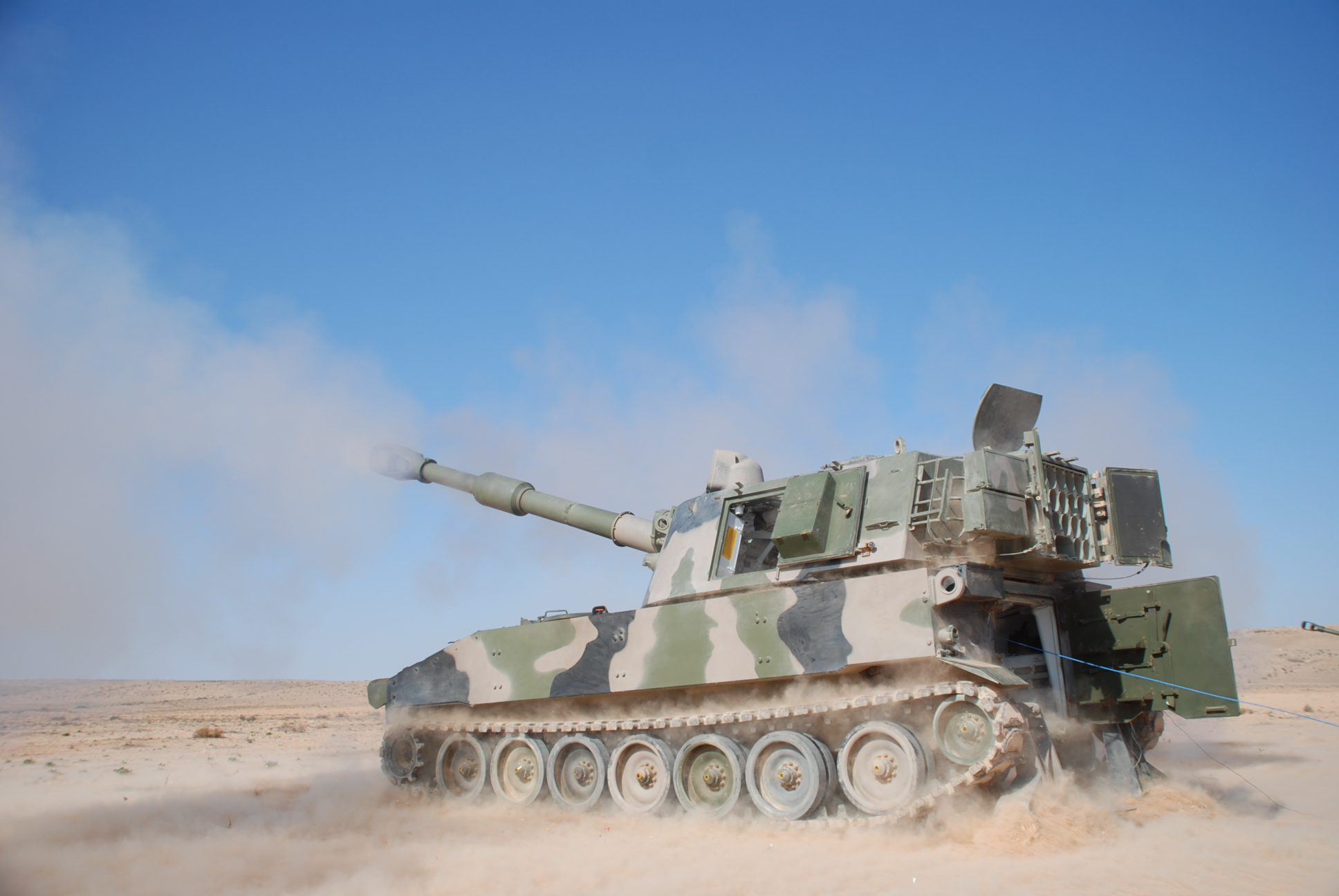
A Self Propelled Howitzer M109A5 of the 15th Royal Moroccan Artillery Group

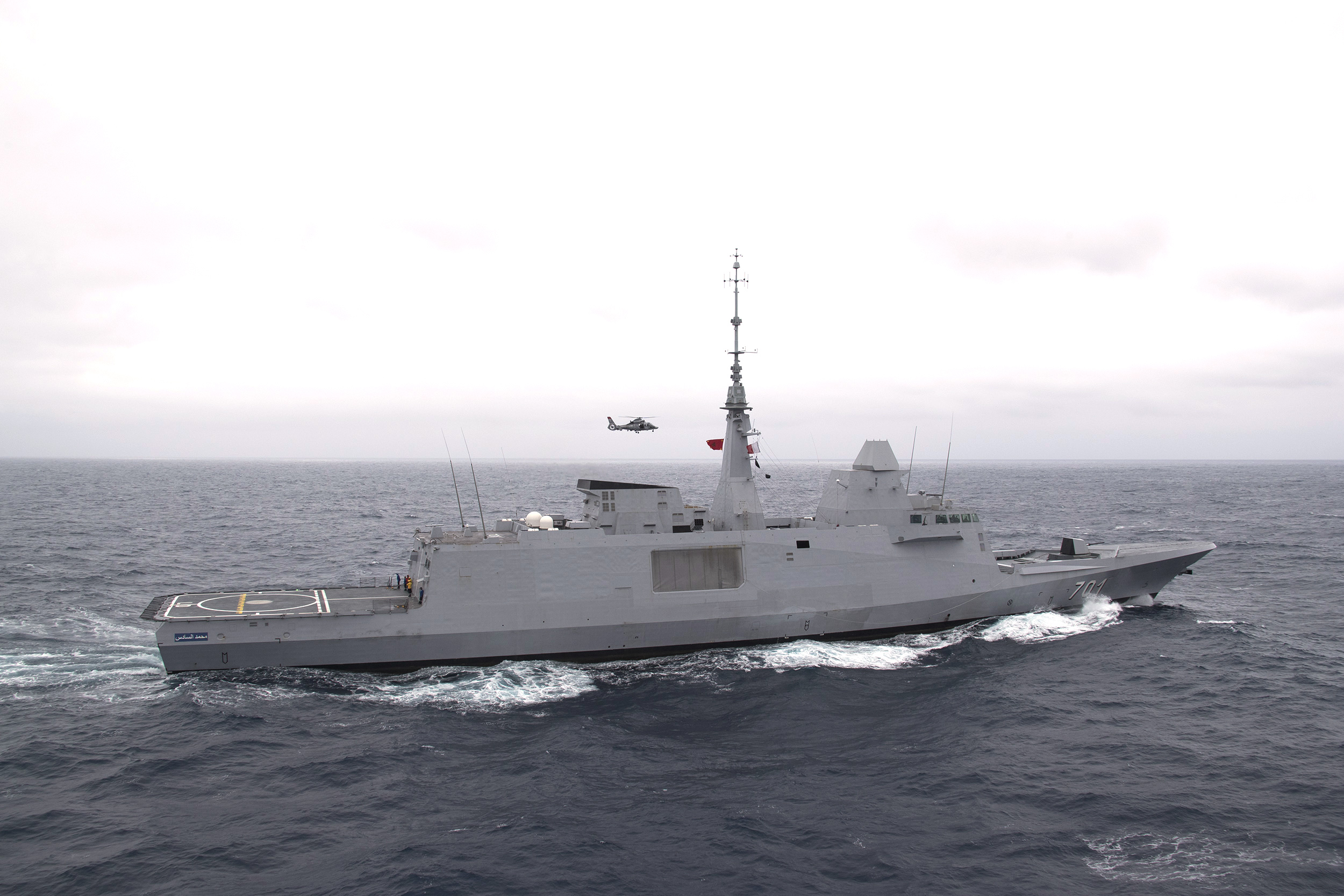
Frigate Mohammed VI, the most modern and flagship of the Alawite fleet

The modern Moroccan military is composed of the following branches:

=== The Royal Army ===
The Royal Moroccan Army is the branch of the Royal Moroccan Armed Forces responsible for land-based military operations. The army is about 175,000 troops strong, In case of war or a state of siege, an additional force of 250,000 Reservists and paramilitary forces, including 50,000 regulars of the Royal Moroccan Gendarmerie and 70,000 Auxiliary Forces come under the Ministry of Defense command. The Moroccan Army helped with the annexation of Western Sahara which is disputed.

==== Royal Guard ====
The Moroccan Royal Guard is officially part of the Royal Moroccan Army, However, it is under the direct operational control of the Royal Military Household of His Majesty the King, The sole duty of the guard is to provide for the security and safety of the King and royal family of Morocco with 3,500 personnel.

=== The Royal Air Force ===
The Royal Moroccan Air Force is the air force branch of the Moroccan Armed Forces, It employs 13,000 personnel and is equipped with more than 300 aircraft. In the 21st century, the Royal Moroccan Air Force started a progressive modernization program of its aging fleet and its technical and operational capacities.

=== The Royal Navy ===
The Royal Navy is the branch of the Moroccan Armed Forces responsible of conducting naval operations, 7,800 personnel strong Its mission includes the protection of Moroccan territory and sovereignty, as well as the control of Morocco's 280,000-square-kilometre (81,000 sq nmi) Exclusive Economic Zone. Given Morocco's significant coastline (2,952 km) and strategic position overseeing the strait of Gibraltar, it (with Spain and the United Kingdom) is deeply involved in the security of this important international waterway.

=== Royal Gendarmerie ===
The Moroccan Royal Gendarmerie is the Gendarmerie body of Morocco. The legislation which founded the Royal Moroccan Gendarmerie describes it as a public force designed to guarantee public security and public order and the implementation of laws. This legislation text attaches the Gendarmerie to the Royal Moroccan Army, then constituting a military force in its structure, administration and command forms. It consists of officers and NCOs.

== History of participation in peacekeeping operations ==
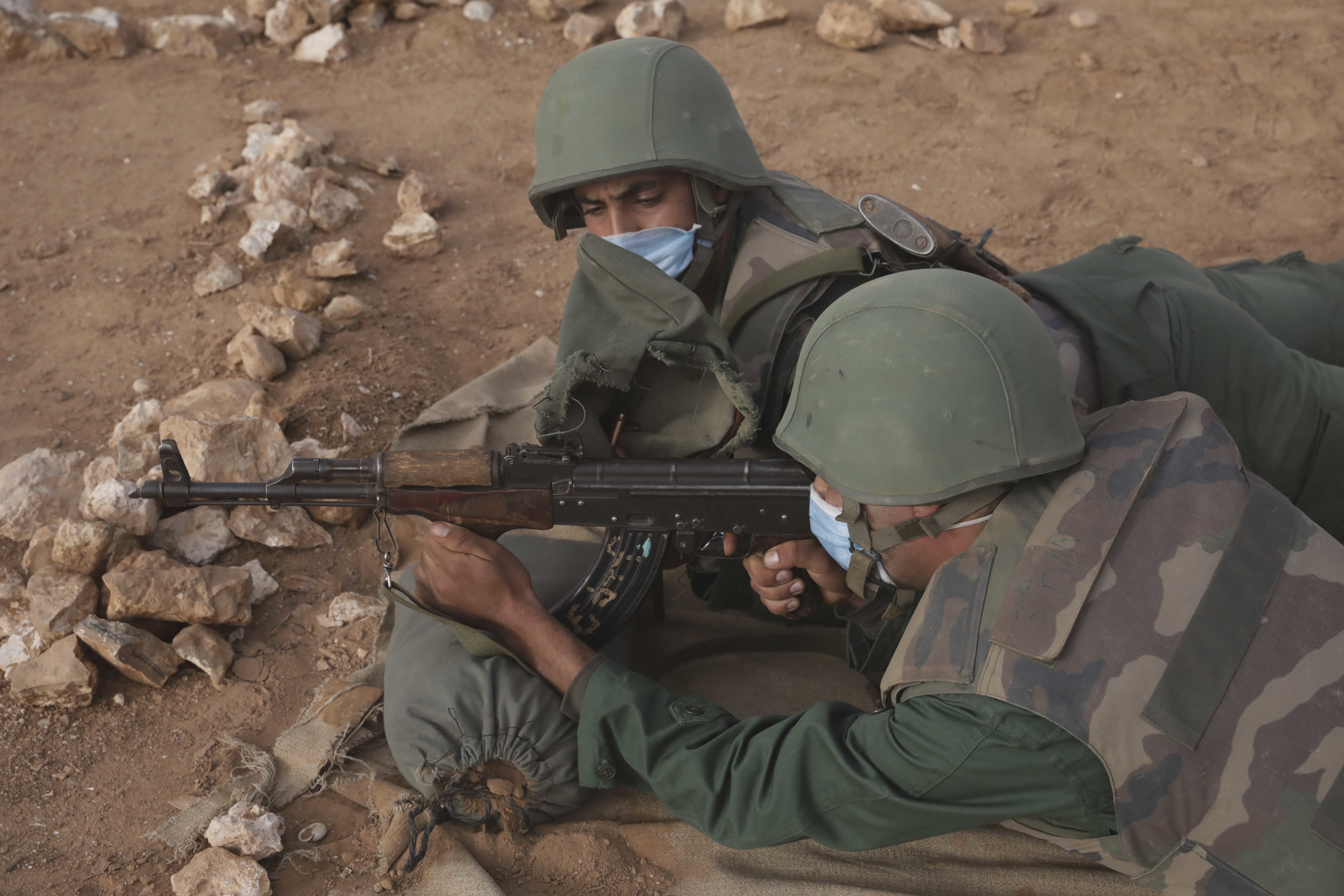
Moroccan soldiers during African Lion 2021 exercises

=== Congo 1960–1961 ===
Congo United Nations Operation in the Congo

By 20 July 1960 Morocco had deployed 1,250 troops in Congo.

=== Somalia 1992–1994 ===
Somalia UNOSOM I, UNITAF, UNOSOM II

=== Bosnia and Herzegovina 1996–2007 ===
Bosnia and Herzegovina IFOR, SFOR, EUFOR Althea

=== Kosovo 1998-1999 ===
Kosovo Kosovo War

Morocco has deployed one company of soldiers to contribute in the NATO-led international peacekeeping force which was responsible for establishing a secure environment in Kosovo.

=== Haiti 2004–2006 ===
Haiti MINUSTAH

In 2004, Morocco provided an infantry company as part of a joint Spanish-Moroccan battalion, which was deployed in Fort Liberté, in the north-eastern part of Haiti. Disagreements between the United Nations and the Spanish government led to Spain´s withdrawal from the mission, leaving the Moroccans in charge of a much larger area than what was initially designed. The last Moroccan troops left Haiti in 2006, and the area was covered by a battalion from Uruguay, which already had another unit in the South of the country. About six Moroccan Army officers served in the mission HQ during this period.

=== Democratic Republic of the Congo since 1999 ===
Morocco has deployed 6 observers, one mechanised infantry battalion and one field hospital to participate in the United Nations Security Council efforts to monitor the peace process of the Second Congo War.

=== Ivory Coast since 2004 ===
Ivory Coast UNOCI

Morocco has deployed one infantry battalion to participate in the UNOCI peacekeeping mission whose objective is "to facilitate the implementation by the Ivorian parties of the peace agreement signed by them in January 2003" (which aimed to end the Ivorian Civil War). The two main Ivorian parties here are the Ivorian Government forces who control the south of the country, and the New Forces (former rebels), who control the north. The UNOCI mission aims to control a "zone of confidence" across the centre of the country separating the two parties.

=== Central African Republic since 2013 ===
Central African Republic BINUCA, MINUSCA

The Moroccan Royal Armed Forces has sent a contingent of 777 Moroccan soldiers on December 25, 2013 for the Central African Republic to be deployed in the UN Integrated Peace building Office (BINUCA). Moroccan authorities also said they stand ready to support the Central African Republic in its path toward peace and stability.

== Motto ==
The Royal Moroccan Armed Forces motto, which graces every military base, banner, and ship, is: God, The Homeland, and The King.

- God: The Creator of all destiny, by His Mercy we draw from, He ordains our choice to the right path.
- The Homeland: The Land that begets our bounty, from which we sustain ourselves we protect its integrity and defend it from all enemies.
- King: Our commander and guide, he guides our renaissance and development, protector of our people's rights.

== Gallery ==
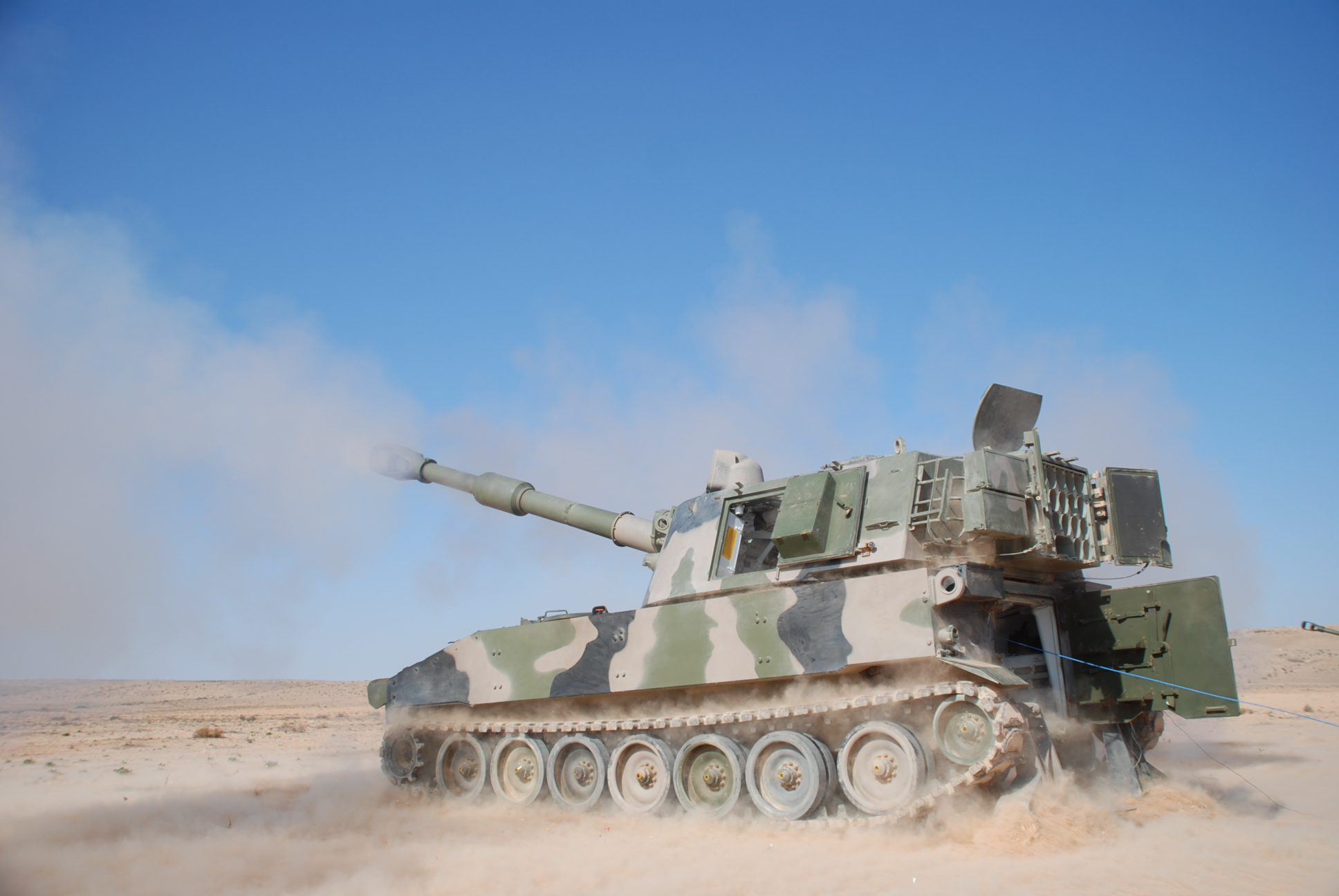
RMA's M109A5 howitzer.

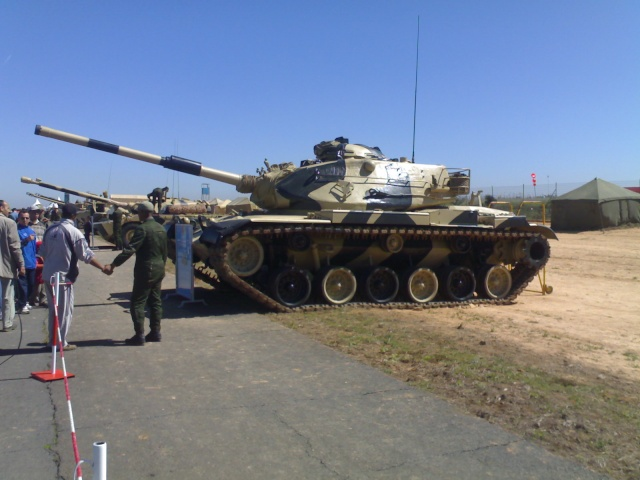
Moroccan M60A3 during a 2006 Army expo.

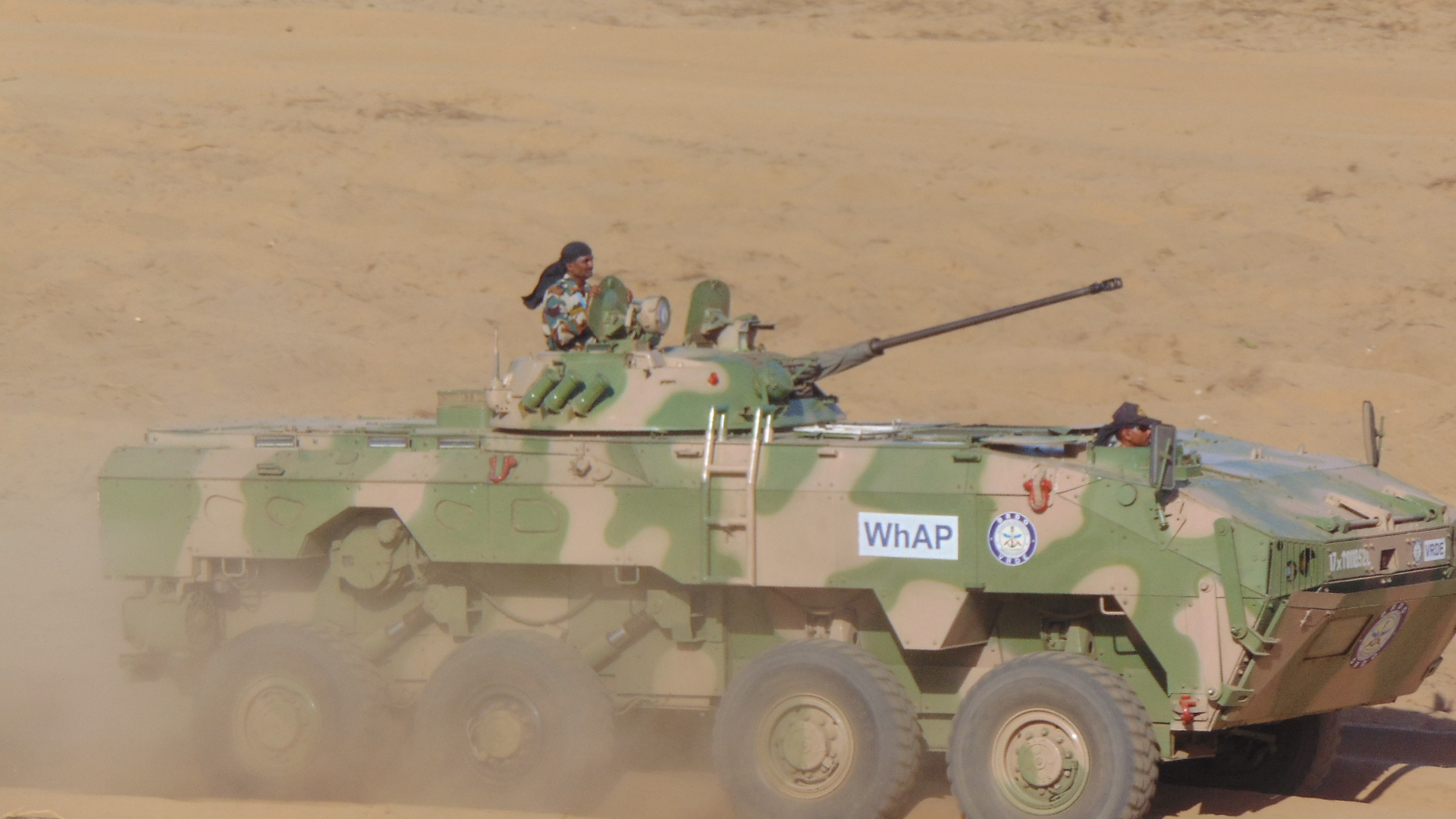
TATA Kestrel to be manufactured in Morocco as part of modernization of Army.

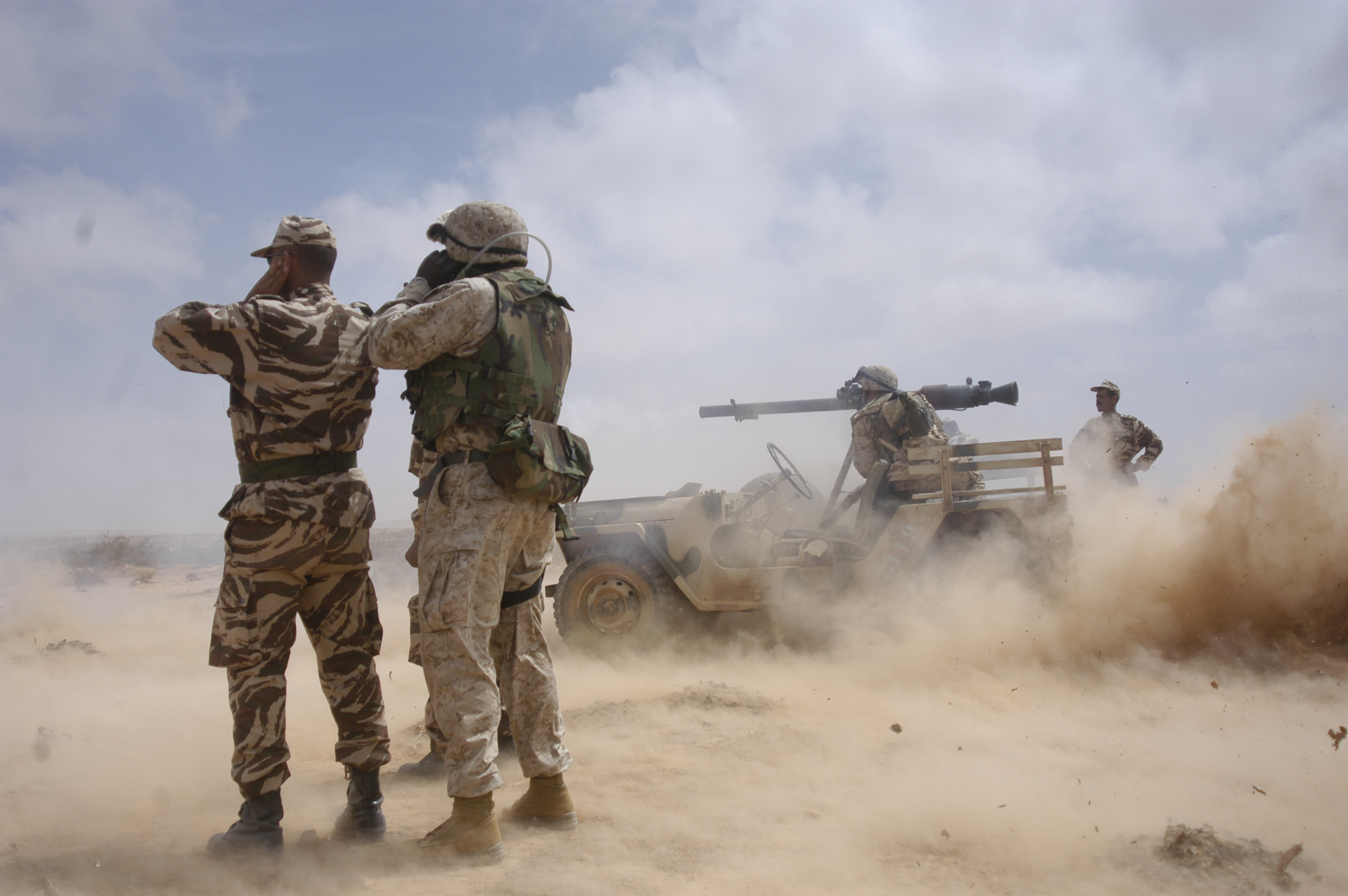
US Marines and Moroccan soldiers during exercise African Lion in Tan tan.

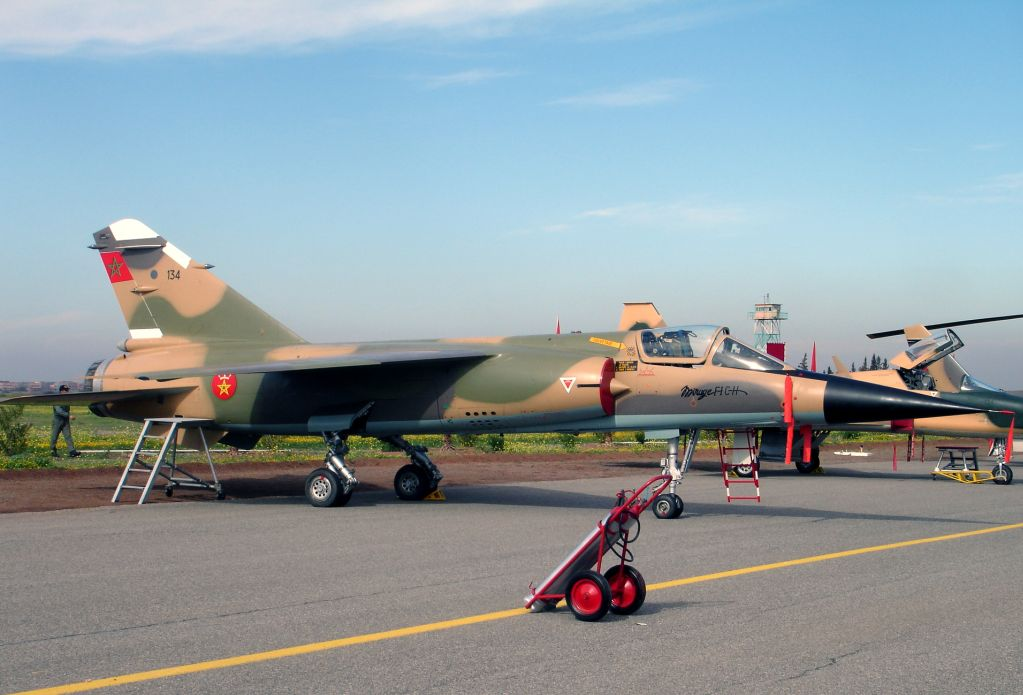
Royal Moroccan Air Force Mirage F1.

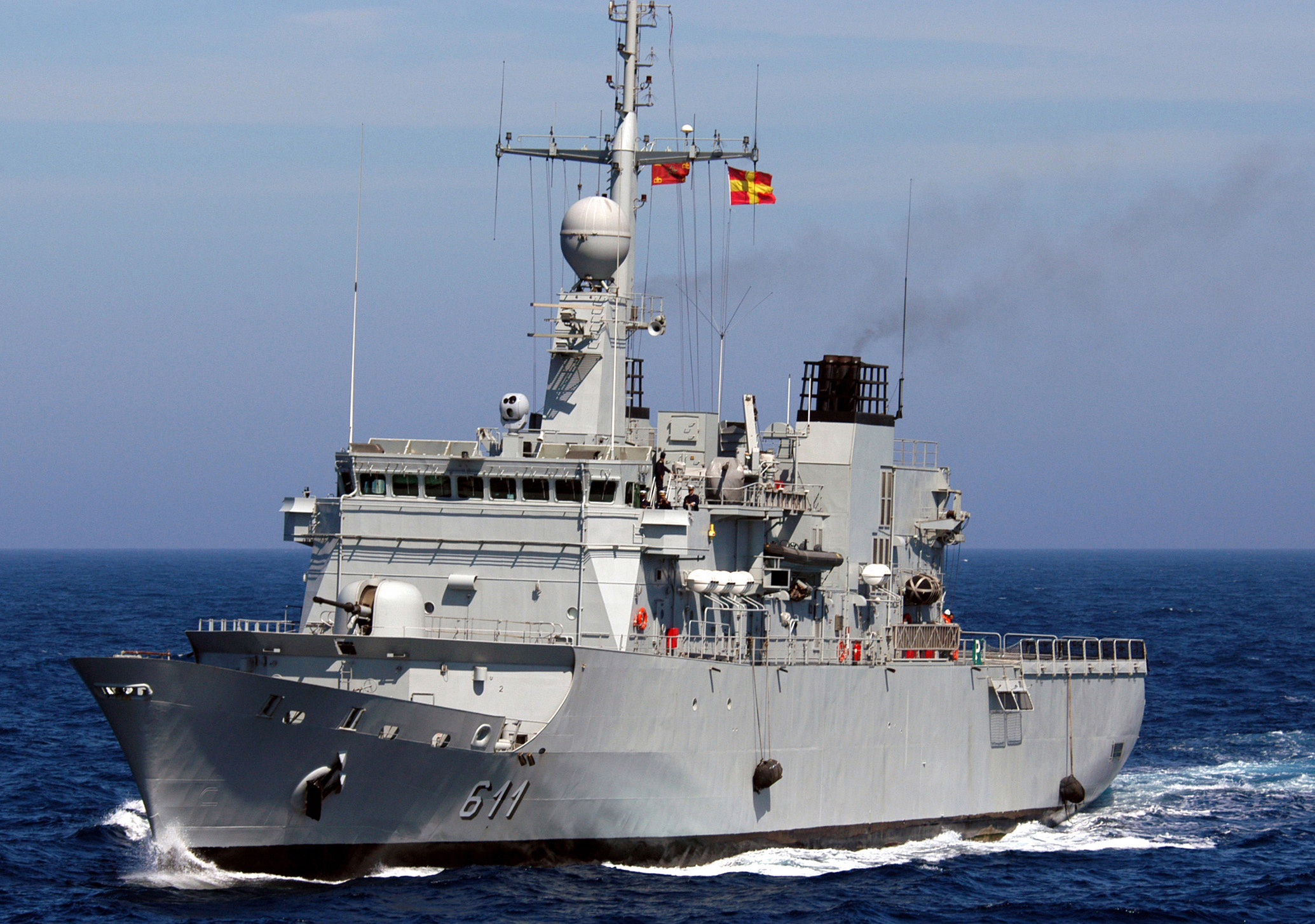
Floréal Class Mohammed V.

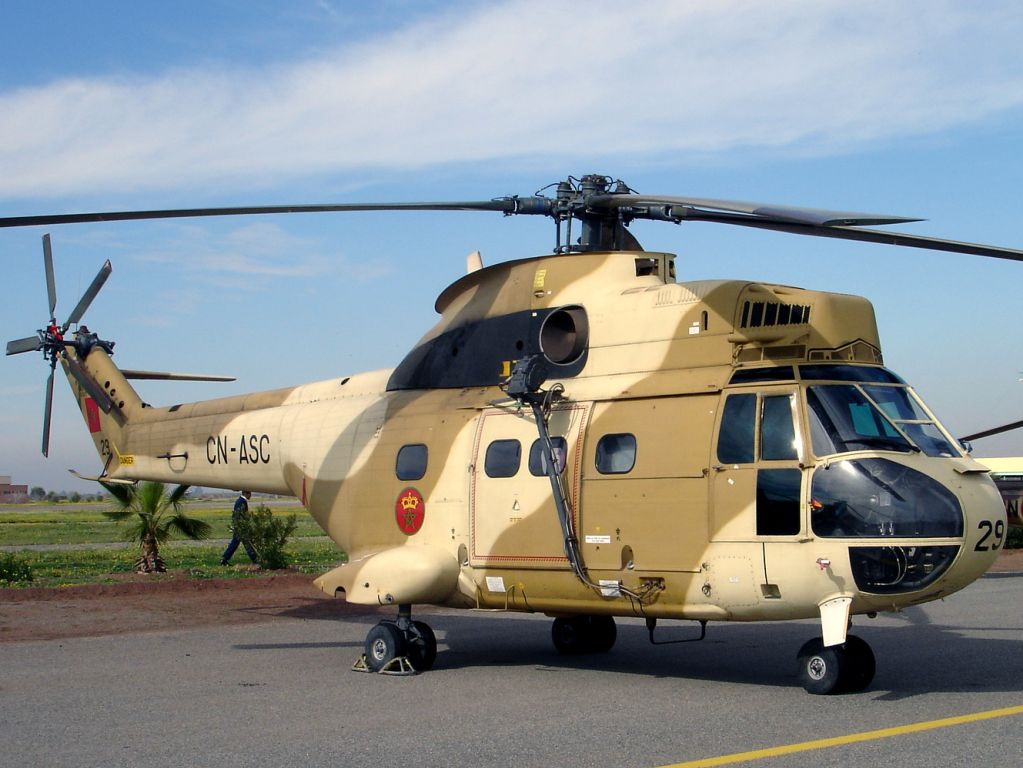
Royal Moroccan Air Force SA330 Puma.

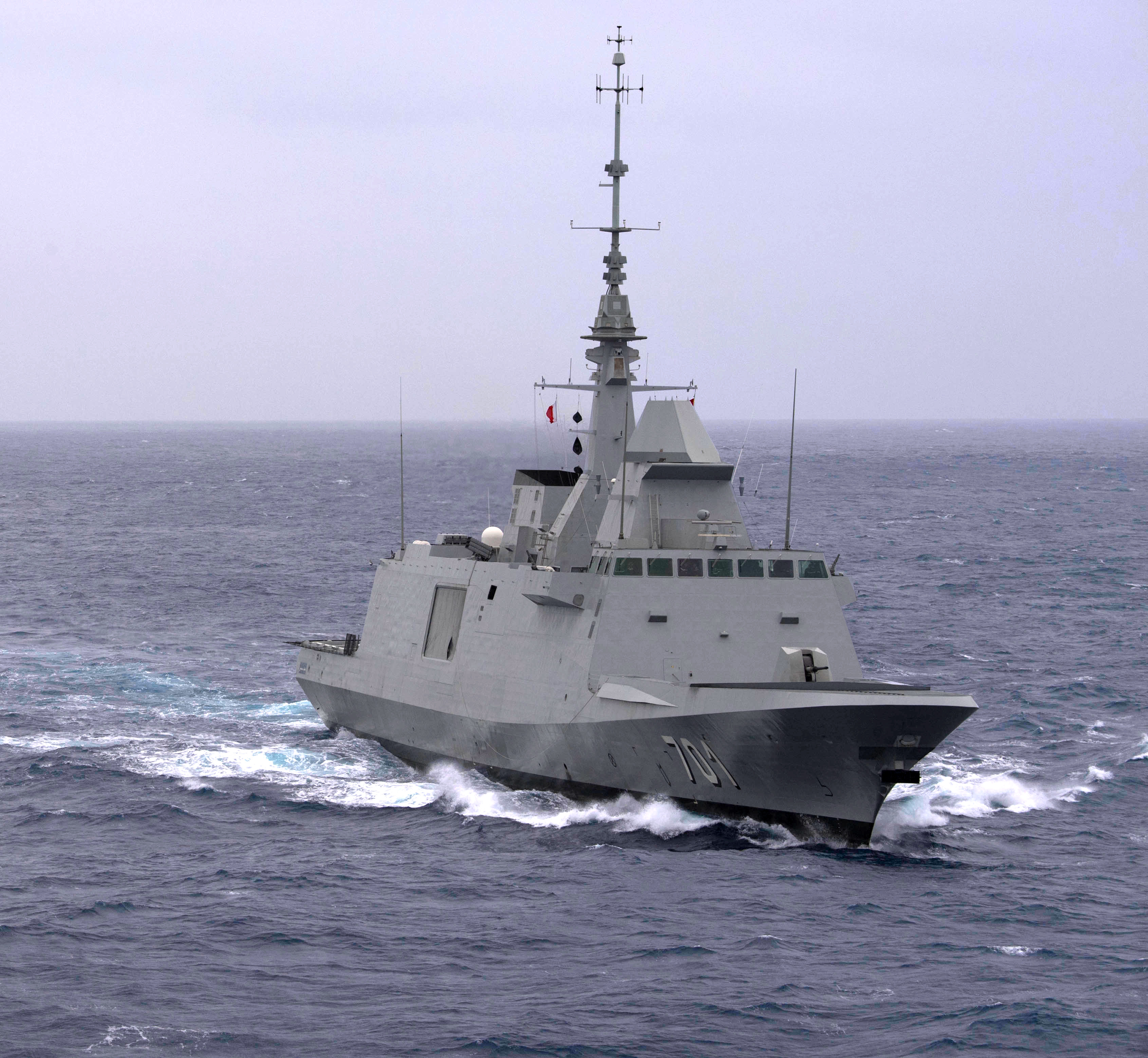
Moroccan FREMM frigate

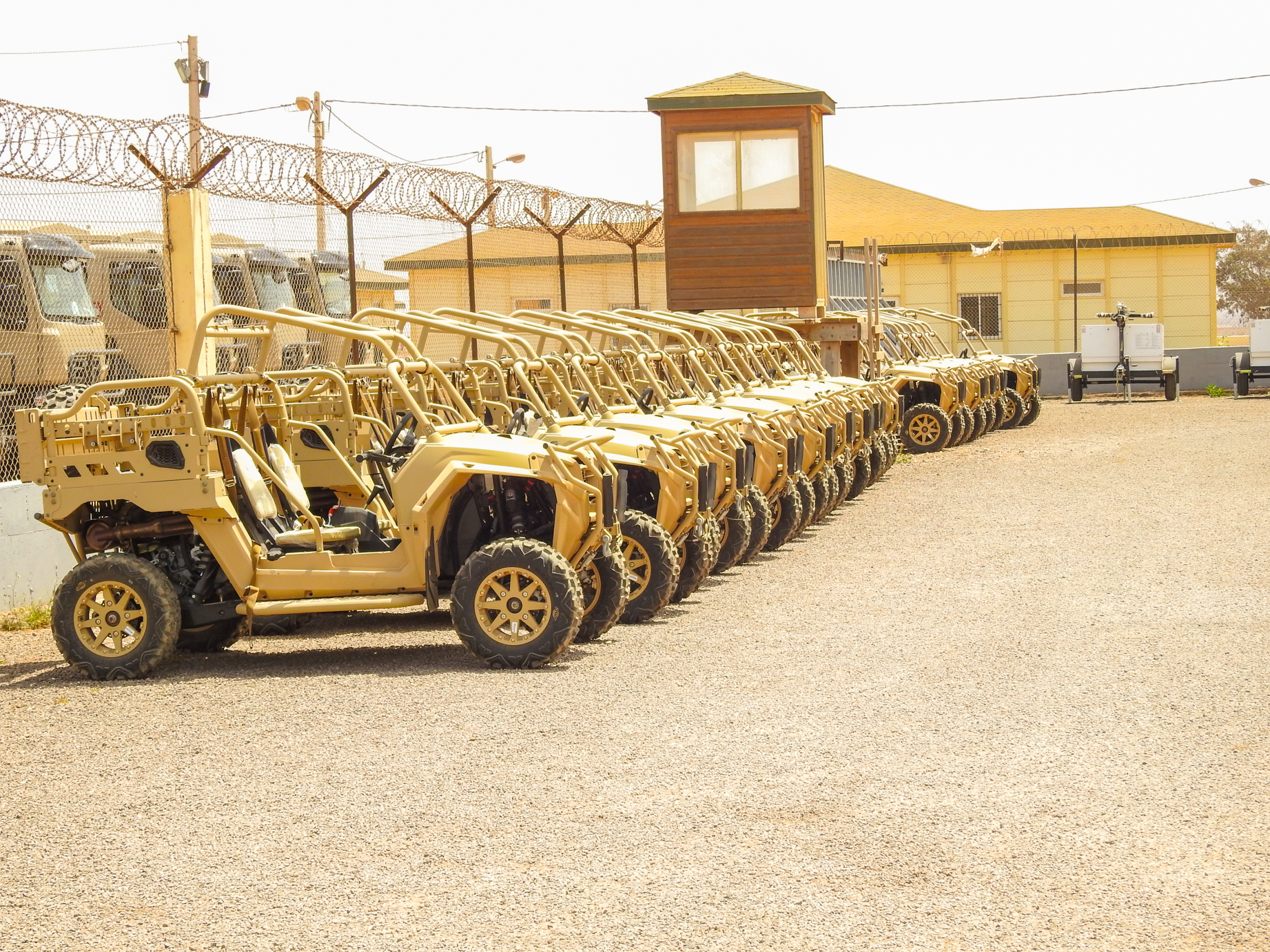
Moroccan SF Polaris MRZR-2/4

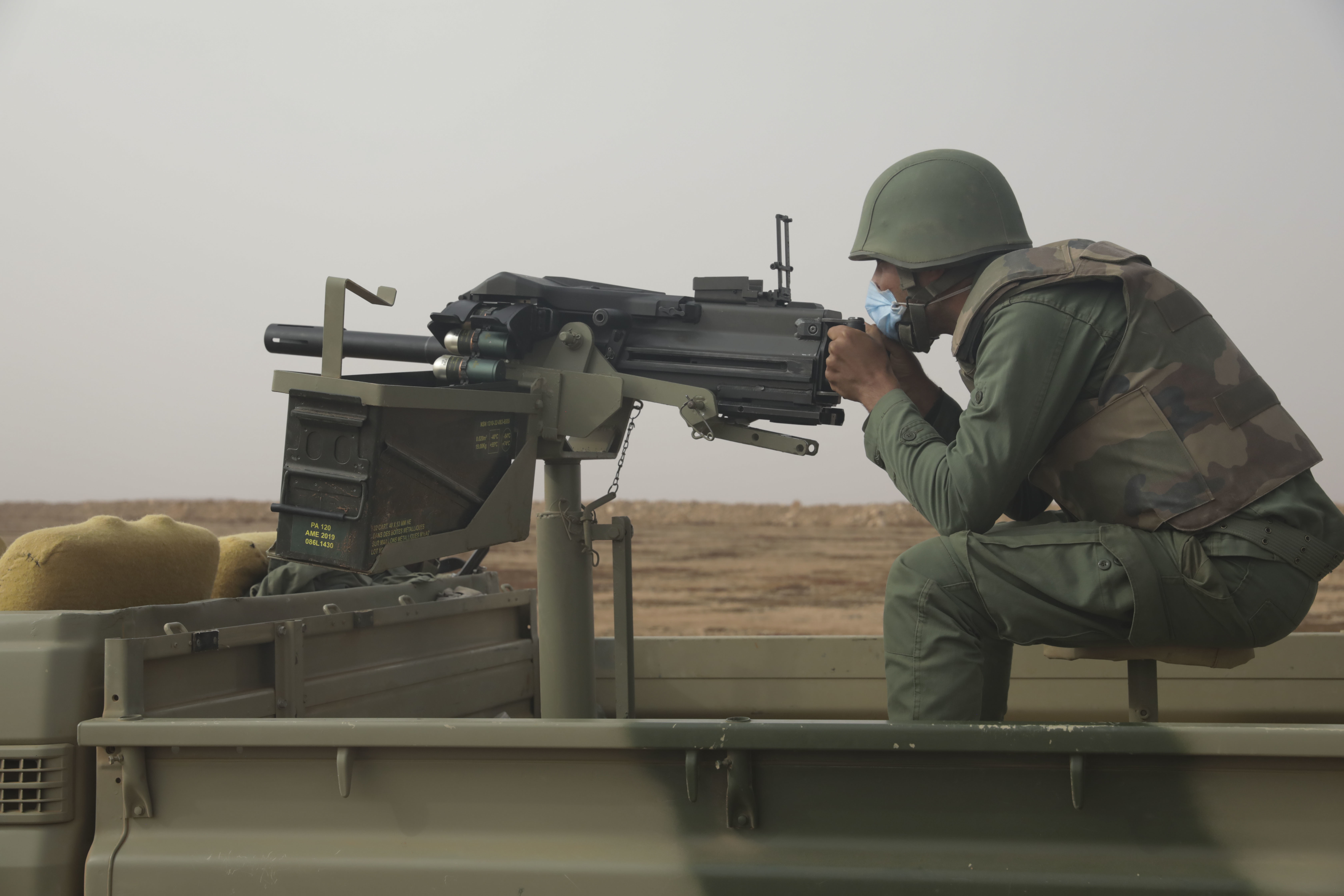
Moroccan soldier using the Mk19 grenade launcher

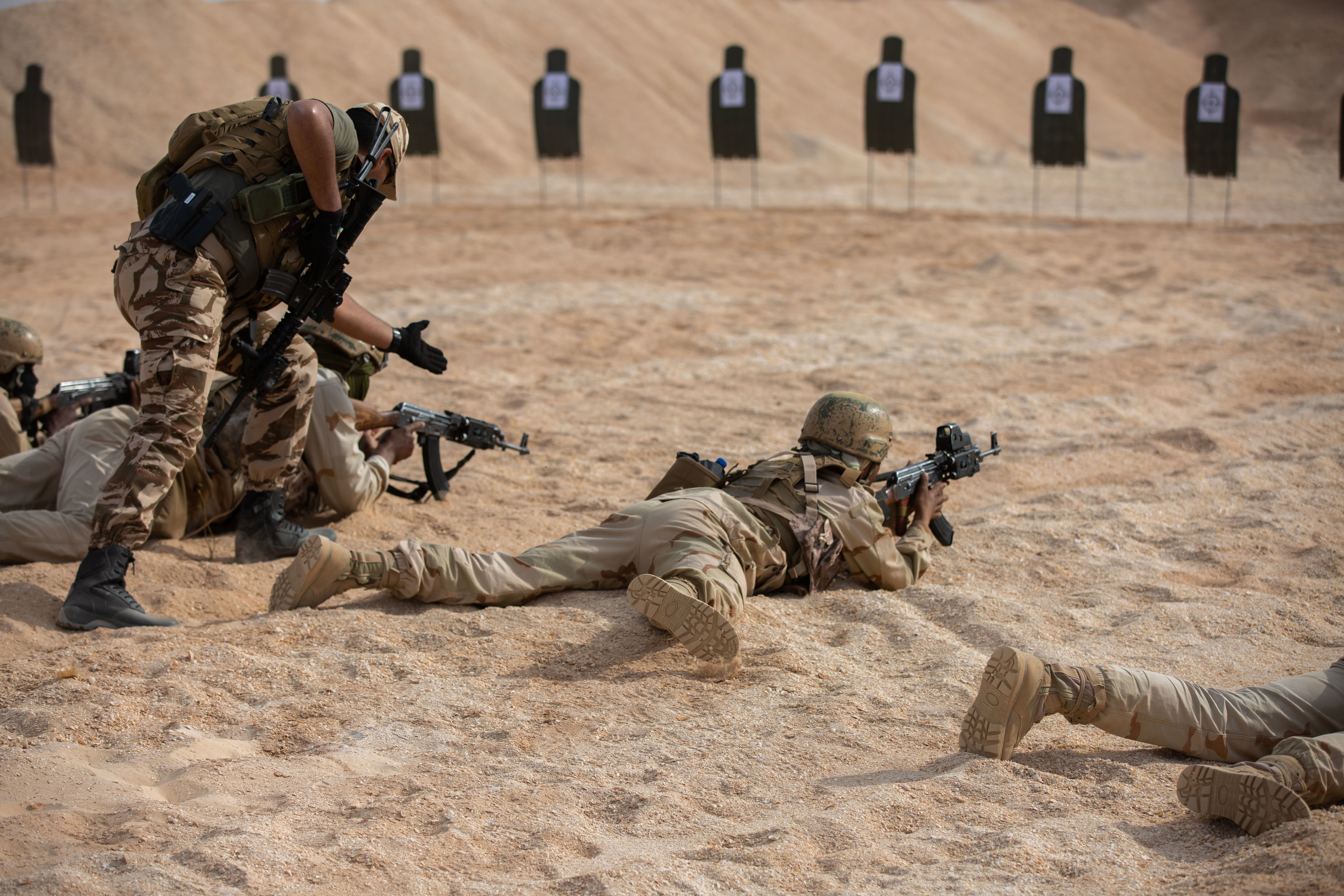
Moroccan M-SOF operator training Mauritanian forces

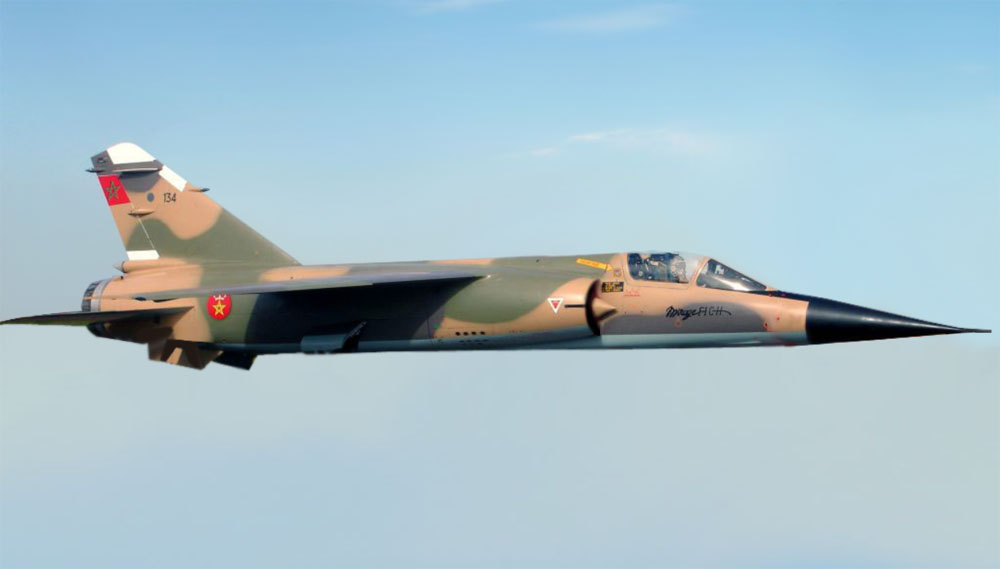
Moroccan Mirage F-1 in flight

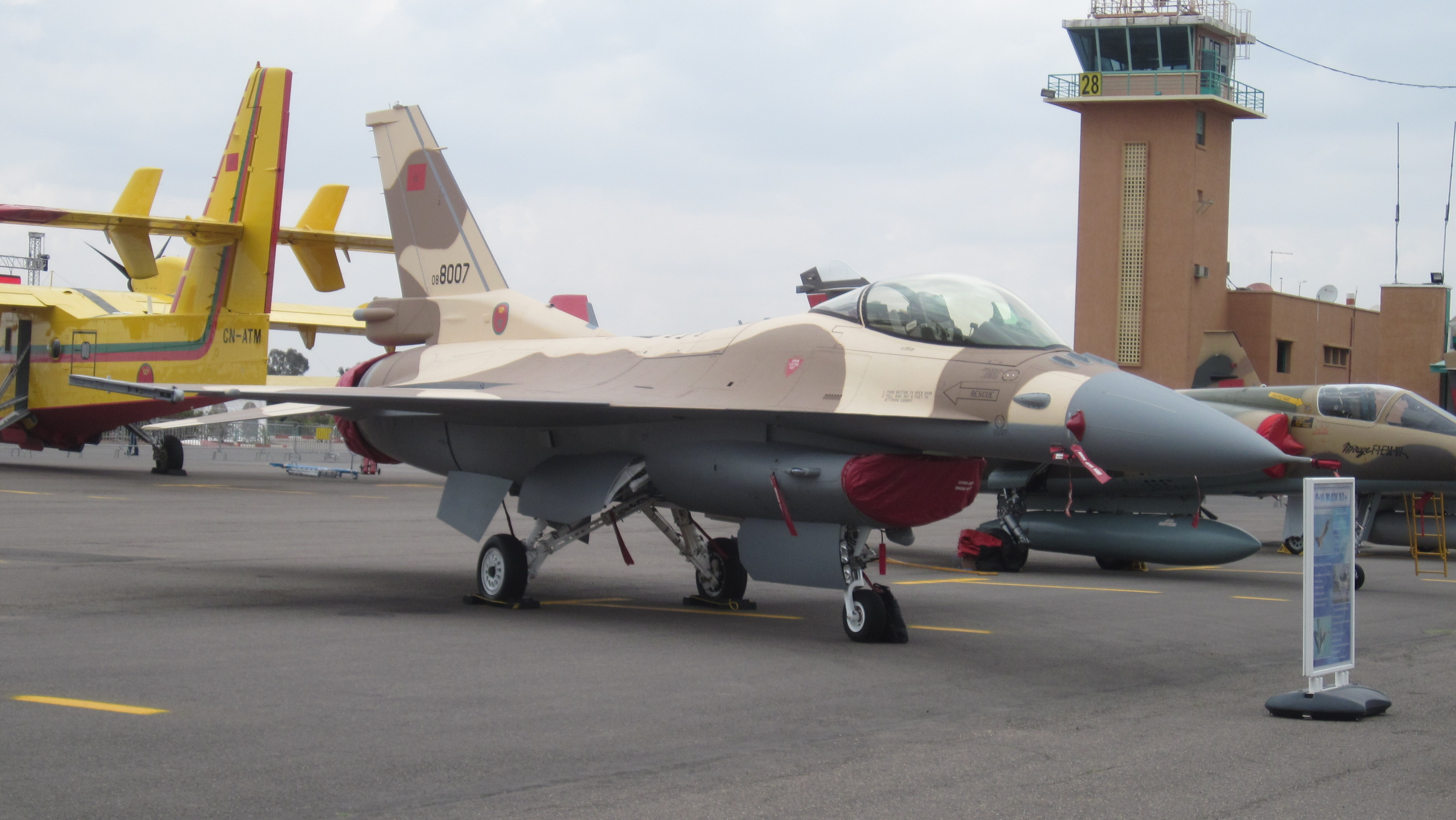
Royal Moroccan Air Force F-16 at the 2012 Marrakech Air Show

== Bibliography ==
- International Institute for Strategic Studies (February 2021). "The Military Balance, Volume 121, Issue 1 (2021)". The Military Balance. 121 (1). London: Routledge. ISSN 0459-7222.

== See also ==
- National Defense Administration
- Auxiliary Forces a paramilitary force composed of army veterans which, following the command of the Ministry of the Interior, supplements the military, Gendarmerie and police when needed.
- Battle of Smara (1979)
