= Royal Moroccan Army =

Land combat force of the Royal Moroccan Military

- Arabic: القوات البرية الملكية المغربية
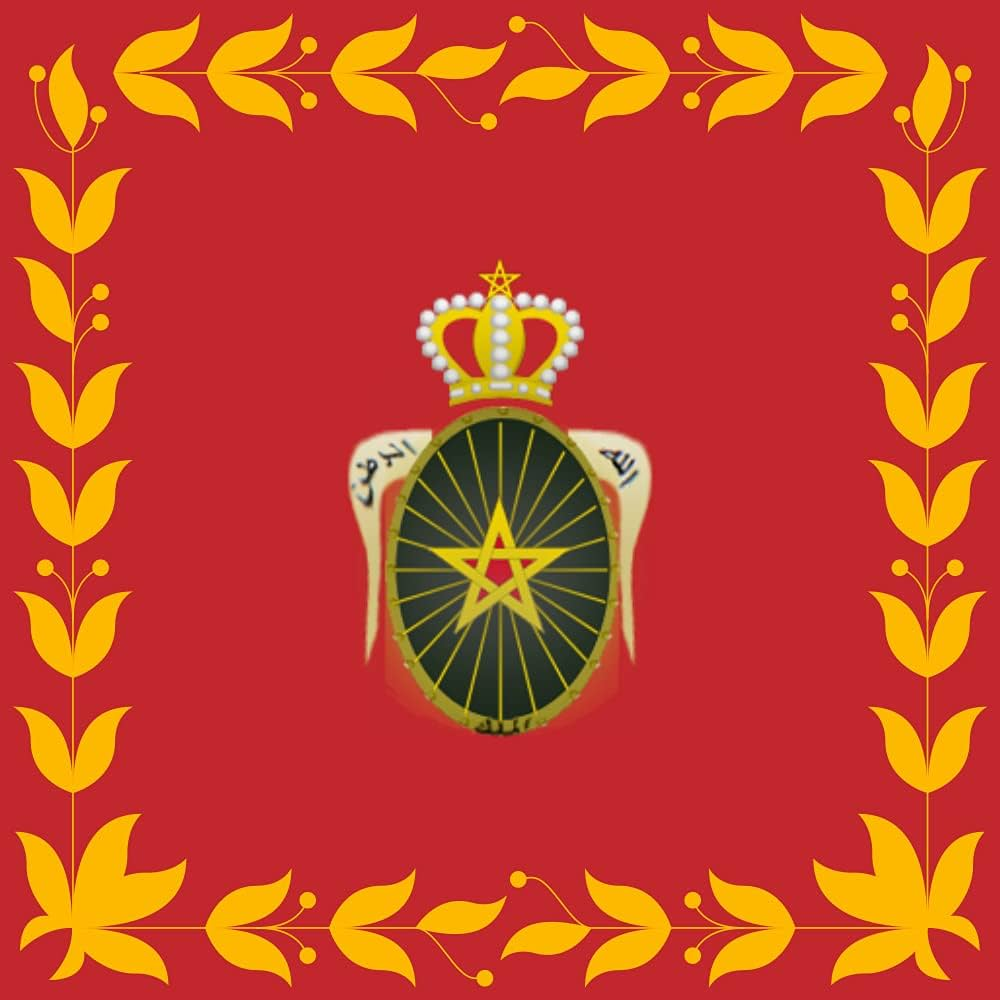
- Founded: 1956
- Country: Morocco
- Allegiance: King of Morocco
- Branch: Army
- Role: Land force
- Size: 175,000
- Part of: Royal Moroccan Armed Forces
- Mottos: God, Homeland, King; Arabic: الله ,الوطن ,الملك
- Anniversaries: 14 May
- Engagements: Ifni War; 1958 Rif riots Algerian War; Sand War; Six-Day War; Yom Kippur War; Western Sahara War; Shaba I Gulf War; Operation Scorched Earth

Commanders
- Supreme Commander of the Armed Forces: Mohammed VI of Morocco
- Minister-Delegate of the Administration of Defense: Abdellatif Loudiyi
- General Inspector of the Armed Forces: Mohammed Berrid
- Notable commanders: Ahmed Dlimi

Insignia
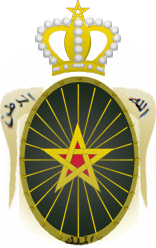
- Army Insignia

The Royal Moroccan Army (Arabic: القوات البرية الملكية المغربية Al-Quwwat al-Bariyah al-Malakiyah al-Maghribiyah) is the branch of the Royal Moroccan Armed Forces responsible for land-based military operations.

The Royal Army consists of 175,000 soldiers. In the event of emergency situations, an additional force of 400,000 reservists, 240,000 gendarmes, 100,000 members of the Auxiliary Forces, and 5,000 members of the Mobile Intervention Corps are made available to the Moroccan Defense Staff.

Army forces from Morocco have taken part in various wars and battles during the twentieth century.

== History ==
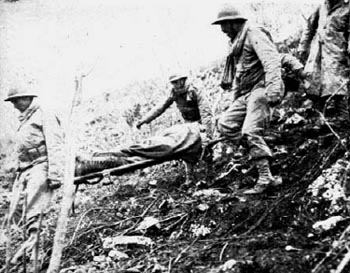
Moroccan troops in Italy, December 1943

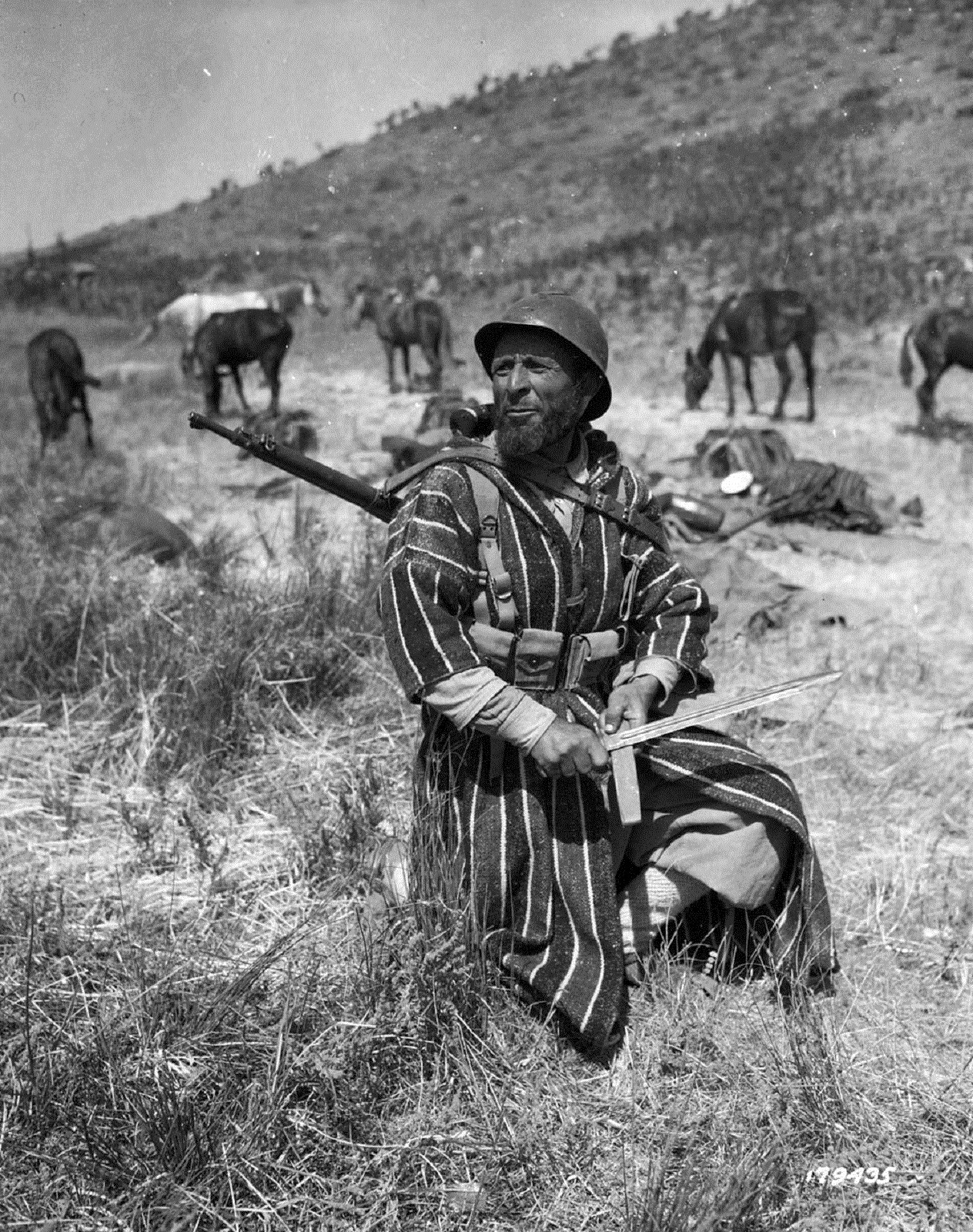
Moroccan Goumier sharpening his bayonet, Italy 1944

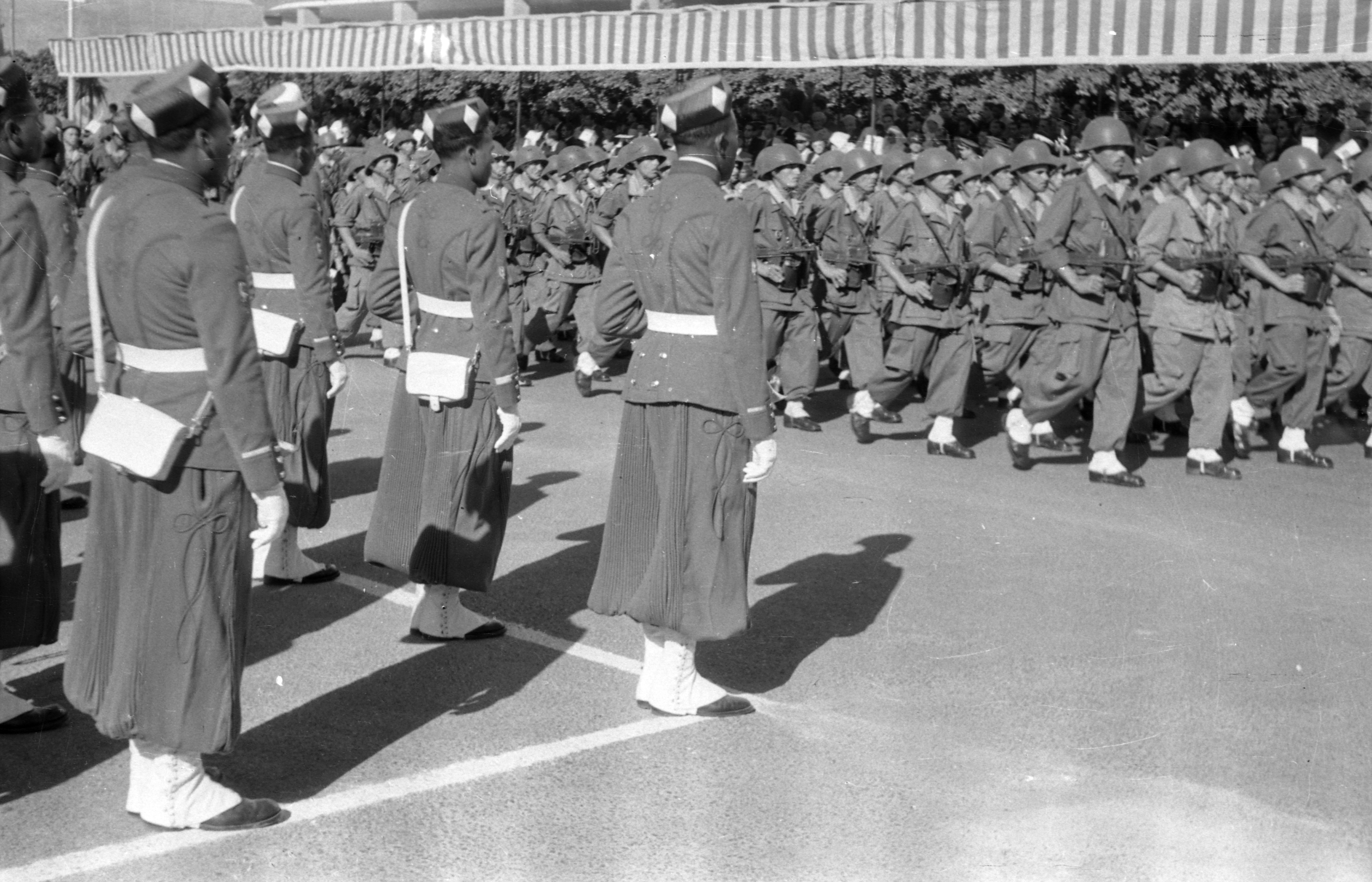
Moroccan soldiers during a military parade in 1960

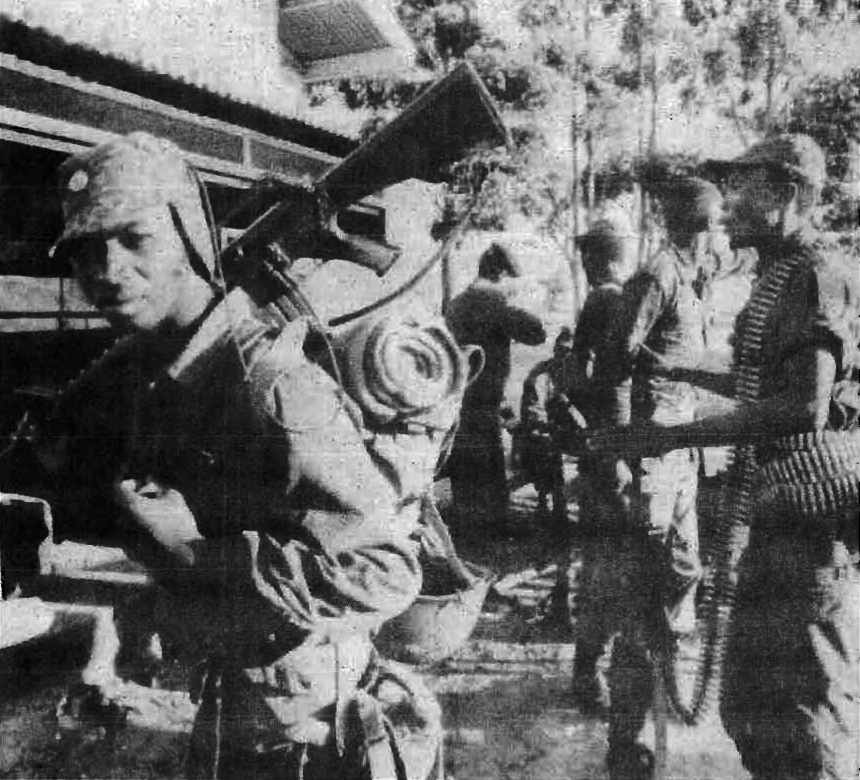
Zairian troops with a beret-wearing Moroccan military advisor (1977)

Moroccan troops and international coalition forces united against Saddam Hussein during Operation Desert Storm.

The Moroccan army has existed continuously since the rising of Almoravid Empire in the 11th century. During the protectorate period (1912–1955), large numbers of Moroccans were recruited for service in the Spahi and Tirailleur regiments of the French Army of Africa (French: Armée d'Afrique). Many served during World War I. During World War II more than 300,000 Moroccan troops (including goumier auxiliaries) served with the Free French forces in North Africa, Italy, France and Austria. The two world conflicts saw Moroccan units earning the nickname of "Todesschwalben" (death swallows) by German soldiers as they showed particular toughness on the battlefield. After the end of World War II, Moroccan troops formed part of the French Far East Expeditionary Corps engaged in the First Indochina War from 1946 to 1954.

The Spanish Army also made extensive use of Moroccan troops recruited in the Spanish Protectorate, during both the Rif War of 1921–26 and the Spanish Civil War of 1936–39. Moroccan Regulares, together with the Spanish Legion, made up Spain's elite Spanish Army of Africa. A para-military gendarmerie, known as the "Mehal-la Jalifianas" and modelled on the French goumieres, was employed within the Spanish Zone.

The Royal Armed Forces were created on 14 May 1956, after French Morocco, a French Protectorate, was dissolved. Fourteen thousand Moroccan personnel from the French Army and ten thousand from the Spanish Armed Forces transferred into the newly formed armed forces. This number was augmented by approximately 5,000 former guerrillas from the "Army of Liberation". About 2,000 French officers and NCOs remained in Morocco on short-term contracts, until crash training programmes at the military academies of Saint-Cyr, Toledo and Dar al Bayda produced sufficient numbers of Moroccan commissioned officers.

The first wars that Moroccan troops have taken part in the 20th century as an independent country were the Ifni War and the Sand War.

In the early 1960s, Moroccan troops were sent to the Congo as part of the first multifunctional UN peacekeeping operation, ONUC. But the Moroccan Armed Forces were most notable in fighting a 25-year asymmetric war (Western Sahara War) against the POLISARIO, an Algerian backed rebel national liberation movement seeking the independence of Western Sahara from Morocco.

The Royal Moroccan Army fought during the Six-Day War and on the Golan front during the Yom Kippur War of 1973 (mostly in the battle for Quneitra) and intervened decisively in the 1977 conflict known as Shaba I to save Zaire's regime. After Shaba II, Morocco was part of the Inter-African Force deployed on the Zaire border, contributing about 1,500 troops. The Armed Forces also took part in the Gulf War with a Mechanized Battalion and an infantry battalion in the Omar and Tariq Task Forces.

In the 1990s, Moroccan troops went to Angola with the three UN Angola Versification Missions, UNAVEM I, UNAVEM II, and UNAVEM III. They were also in Somalia, with UNOSOM I, the U.S.-led Unified Task Force (UNITAF), sometimes known by its U.S. codename of 'Restore Hope,' and the follow-on UNOSOM II. They saw fighting during the 3–4 October 1993 confrontation in Mogadishu to rescue a U.S. anti-militia assault force. Other peace support involvement during the 1990s included United Nations Transitional Authority in Cambodia (UNTAC) in Cambodia, and the missions in the former Yugoslavia: IFOR, SFOR, and KFOR.

Recent United Nations deployment in Africa and elsewhere have included the United Nations Organization Stabilization Mission in the Democratic Republic of the Congo (MONUSCO), the UNOCI, BINUCA and MISCA (2014)

Other missions have included:

- Perejil Island crisis
- International Security Assistance Force Joint Command
- Operation Scorched Earth
- MINUSTAH
- United Nations Supervision Mission in Syria (UNSMIS)

Algeria, Morocco, and other Maghreb states affected by the GSPC insurgency have been assisted in fighting Islamist militants by the United States and the United Kingdom since 2007, when Operation Enduring Freedom – Trans Sahara began.

== Army of Liberation ==
The Army of Liberation (Arabic: جيش التحرير, Standard Moroccan Tamazight: ⴰⵙⴻⵔⴷⴰⵙ ⵏ ⵓⵙⵍⴻⵍⵍⵉ) was a force fighting for the independence of Morocco. In 1956, units of the Army began infiltrating Ifni and other enclaves of Spanish Morocco, as well as the Spanish Sahara. Initially, they received important backing from the Moroccan government. In the Spanish Sahara, the Army rallied Sahrawi tribes along the way, and triggered a large-scale rebellion. In early 1958, the Moroccan king reorganized the Army of Liberation units fighting in the Spanish Sahara as the "Saharan Liberation Army".

The revolt in the Spanish Sahara was put down in 1958 by a joint French and Spanish offensive. The king of Morocco then signed an agreement with the Spanish, as he asserted control over the rebellious southern border areas, and parts of the Army of Liberation was absorbed back into the Moroccan armed forces. Parts were also murdered by Morocco which had found the Army of Liberation's role somewhat problem.

Nationalistic Moroccans tend to see the Army of Liberation battles in Western Sahara as a proof of Western Sahara's loyalty to the Moroccan crown, whereas sympathizers to the Polisario Front view it only as an anti-colonial war directed against Spain. Sahrawi veterans of the Army of Liberation today exist on both sides of the Western Sahara conflict, and both the Kingdom of Morocco and the Sahrawi Arab Democratic Republic celebrate it as part of their political history.

== Forces today ==
=== Situation and equipment ===
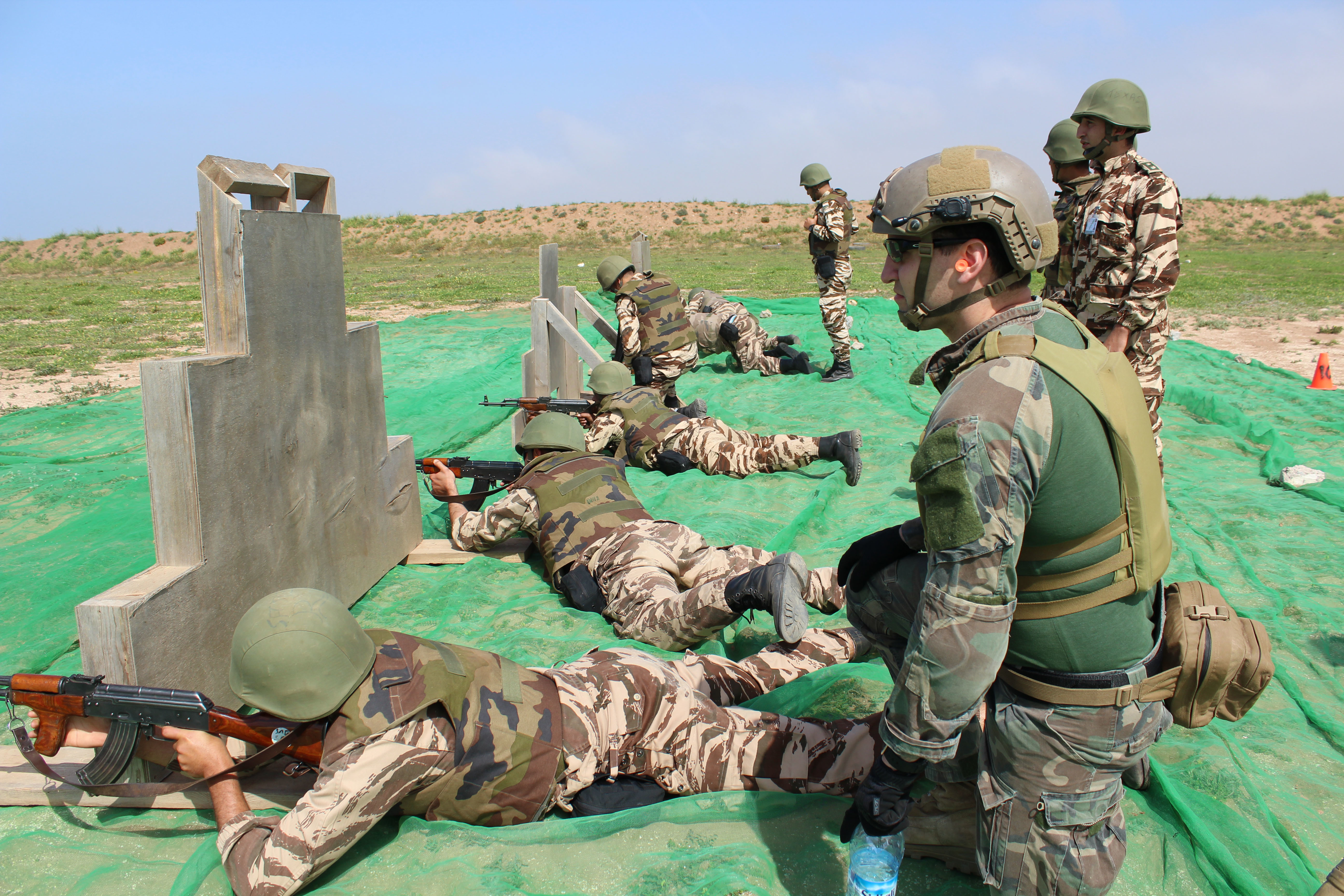
Moroccan soldiers training in 2017

From the beginning of 21st-century, the Moroccan army began a modernisation program that included the purchase of modern equipment and the transformation into a more professional army performing multiple exercises with allied armies, and as a Major non-NATO ally of the US, and member of the initiative 5+5 and other cooperation agreements. The army's modernisation program took shape with the acquisitions of weapons such as the Chinese VT-1A and MRLS AR2, American M1A1 Abrams, the HAWK air defense system or the M109A5 Self-Propelled Howitzer.

The organisation and structure of command remained the same:

- General Command HQ (Rabat)
    - Northern operational Sector.
  - Eastern Command HQ (Errachidia)
    - Eastern operational sector
    - Tafilalt operational sector
    - Saghro operational sector
  - Southern Command (Agadir)
    - Oued draa operational sector.
    - Sakia El Hamra operational sector.
    - Oued eddahab operational sector.

Formations are as follows:

- 2 Airborne infantry brigades.
- 15 Motorised infantry brigades/Regiments.
- 3 Royal Armored brigades.
- 13 Royal tanks regiments.
- 6 mechanised infantry brigades.
- 24 Royal Artillery groups (4 Ground to air Groups/2 Rocket artillery groups/18 field artillery groups)
- 1 light security brigade.
- 1 mechanised intervention brigade.
- 1 mountain infantry battalion.
- 2 Royal cavalry regiments.
- 12 Borders surveillance battalions.
- 17 intervention light infantry battalions.
- 11 Makhzen Groups of Auxiliary Forces, includes :
  - Units of Makhzen Borders surveillance (MMS)
  - 4 Green March Commandos (CMV)
  - Auxiliary Forces Motorised (GMM)

=== International projection ===
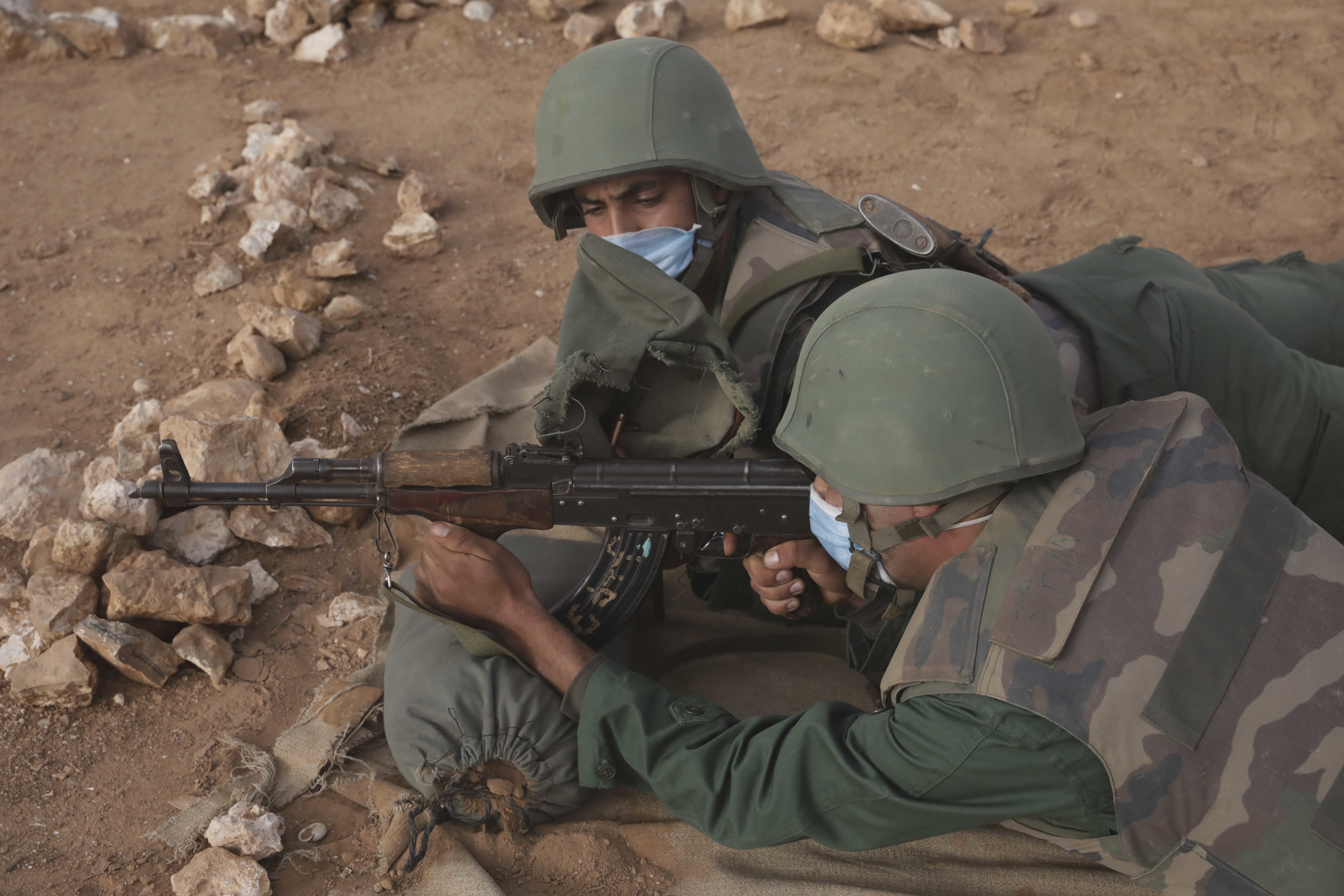
Moroccan soldiers during African Lion 2021 exercises

The Kingdom of Morocco is part of multiple international organisations, as a Major non-NATO ally of the US, part of the Arab League, and has established military cooperation with different countries such as USA, Russia, Portugal, Tunisia, China, Qatar, Italy, France, Spain, UAE or Turkey. As part of the UN, the Moroccan Army has participated in different Peacekeeping missions. Moroccan troops were sent as part of SFOR, KFOR, MINUSTAH or the more recent UNSMIS in Syria. It has also responded the call of its allies, taking part of conflicts such as Shaba I, Battle of Mogadishu (1993), the Gulf War or the Operation Scorched Earth, among others. Morocco has dispatched several field hospitals to conflict zones and areas affected by natural disasters, the latest contributions were at Libyan Civil War, the Syrian civil war. and in the Gaza strip after Operation Pillar of Defense.

The Royal Moroccan Army also performs annual training exercise called "African Lion" with the United States Marine Corps. The exercise is a regularly scheduled, combined U.S. - Moroccan military exercise designed to promote improved interoperability and mutual understanding of each nation's tactics, techniques, procedures, unit readiness and enhancing foreign relations.

Morocco participated in various exercises with the UK armed forces, most notably in being the venue for Exercise "Jebel Sahara" in September 2000, and on 10 other occasions since, gathering elements from 33 Squadron, 230 Squadron, 18 Squadron, 27 Squadron, Joint Helicopter Force HQ from RAF Benson, 1st Battalion Royal Gibraltar Regiment as well as a Moroccan component in the form of the 2nd Brigade d'Infanterie Parachutiste of the Royal Moroccan Army. The aim of the Exercise was to increase the Support Helicopter warfighting capability in desert 'hot and high' conditions and foster good relations between the UK and Morocco. To achieve this, the scenario consisted of a joint counter insurgency operation in the desert and mountain foothills to re-establish control and authority within a troubled region of North Africa. Other exercises were the "Jebel Tarik", with the Moroccan contribution of service personnel to an annual bilateral deployment of two companies (up to 180 personnel) of the Royal Gibraltar Regiment (RG) to the UK, on seven occasions since 2003. "Desert Vortex", a one-off bilateral helicopter exercise run between 16 May and 30 June 2009. This was a UK training exercise with objectives set by Joint Helicopter Command (JHC) and run concurrently with Moroccan Air Force annual helicopter crew training.

The Royal Gibraltar Regiment ran an exercise with the Moroccan 2e Brigade d'Infanterie Parachutiste (2e BIP) in late 2008.

The Royal Armed Forces also take part of different international exercises as Leapfest, Flintlock, Blue Sand, and occasional military operations exercises with Belgium, U.A.E., Spain, France and others.

== Ranks and structure ==
=== Officers ===
Rank group	General / flag officers					Senior officers				Junior officers
Royal Moroccan Army
Royal Moroccan Army	Mushir	Fariq harb	Fariq 'awwal	Fariq	Liwa'	Amīd	Aqīd	Muquddam	Rã'id	Naqīd	Mulāzim 'awwal	Mulāzim
Royal Moroccan Army	Maréchal	Général d'armée	Général de corps d'armée	Général de division	Général de brigade	Colonel-major	Colonel	Lieutenant-colonel	Commandant	Capitaine	Lieutenant	Sous-lieutenant

- Général de l'armé et commandant en chef: Retained by His Majesty the King of Morocco.

=== Enlisted ===
Rank group	Senior NCOs					Junior NCOs		Enlisted
Royal Moroccan Army
Royal Moroccan Army	Mosa'id 'awwal	mosa'id	Raqid thani	Raqid 'awwal	Raqid	Earif 'awwal	Earif	Jundiun 'awwal	Jundium
Royal Moroccan Army	Adjudant-chef	Adjudant	Sergent-major	Sergent-chef	Sergent	Caporal-chef	Caporal	Soldat de première classe	Soldat de deuxième classe

In 2009, the Moroccan army had:

== Equipment ==
The Royal Moroccan Army employs various individual weapons to provide light firepower at short ranges. The main weapons used by the army are the M16A2 and AK-47 variants (Chinese Type 56, Romanian AIM/AIMS, Egyptian Misr, Yugoslav Zastava M70AB2) in the Southern Sector, and the G3A3 and M16A1/A2/A4 in the Northern Sector. The SAR 21, AK-103, Steyr AUG A1/A2/A3, MP5A3, M4 carbine and FN SCAR are used by different units as the Paratroopers, the Royal Guard, Security Forces and others units in the Navy and Air force.

The sidearms in the RMA are the MAB PA-15 for regular service, and Beretta 92 for specialized forces (Paratroopers, Special Forces, Security Forces, etc.)

Many units are supplemented with a variety of specialized weapons, those are the M249, HK11A1, FN Minimi, FALO-50-41, Ultimax 100, PK/PKM, RPD and RPK-74 to provide suppressive fire at the fire-team level. The M14NM and EBR are used by long-range marksmen, and the M82A1, the FR-F2, and the PGM Ultima Ratio are used by snipers. The Army also uses Automatic grenade launchers (AGLs) such as the STK 40 AGL or the Mk 47 Striker both used on VAMTACs LUVs (Light Utility Vehicles) and handled by infantry units.

Other weapons used for training, exercises or parades are :

- The TT-33 and MAC Mle 1950 handguns.
- The MAS-36, the M2, the AR70/90 and MAS-49/56 Rifles
- The M3, MAT-49 and L2A3 submachine guns.

Coaxial Machine Guns and Automatic cannons:

- M240 on M60A3TTS and M1A1SA Abrams
- NSV on T-72B
- AA-52 on AMX-10 RC, VAB VCI and AML60/90
- M73 on M60A3
- M85 on M60A3
- M2HB on Toyota Land Cruiser, M1025, M113A1/A2, AIFV B-C25/AIFV B-50 and VAB VTT
- MG74 on SK-105 Kürassier
- M1919A4 (Vektor MG4 CA) on Ratel IFV 20/90
- M168 Vulcan on M163 VADS
- M621 cannon on VAB VDAA TA20 and SA 341 Gazelle
- M693 on VAB VCI/I Toucan I and Ratel IFV 20
- M134 In use with helicopters
- M60D In use with helicopters

The army uses different types of mortars for indirect fire support when heavier artillery may not be appropriate or available. The smallest of these are the 60mm M2 and MO 60. At the next higher echelon, the support can come from the 107mm M30 mortar, the 120mm M120 and MO-120-RT,120MM ECIA MORTAR AND 120MM NORINCO W86 MORTAR, or the 160mm Mortar M1943. A hundred of self-propelled mortars are also in RMA's inventory.

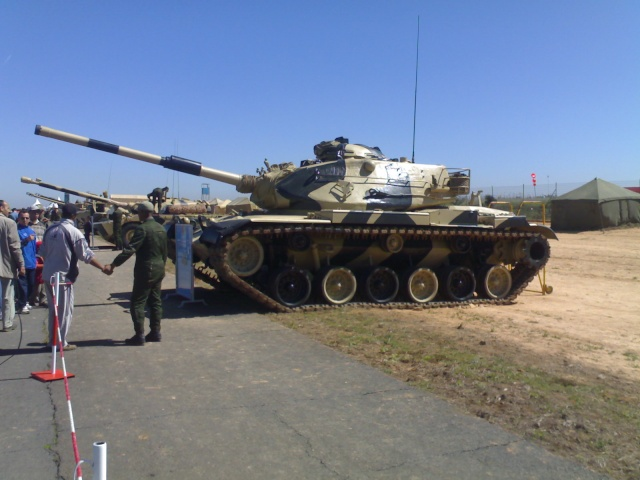
RMA's M60A1 MBT

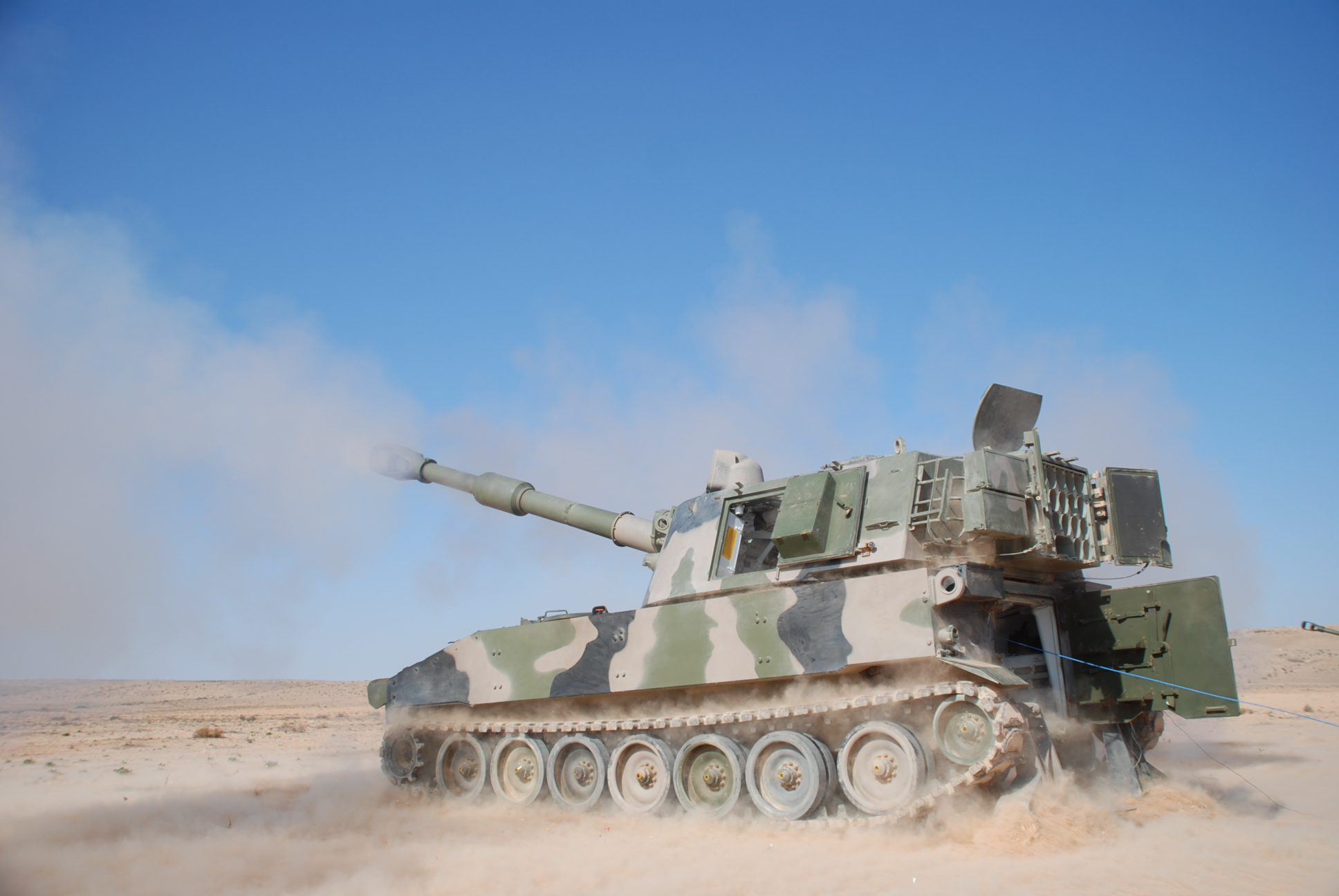
RMA's M109A5 howitzer

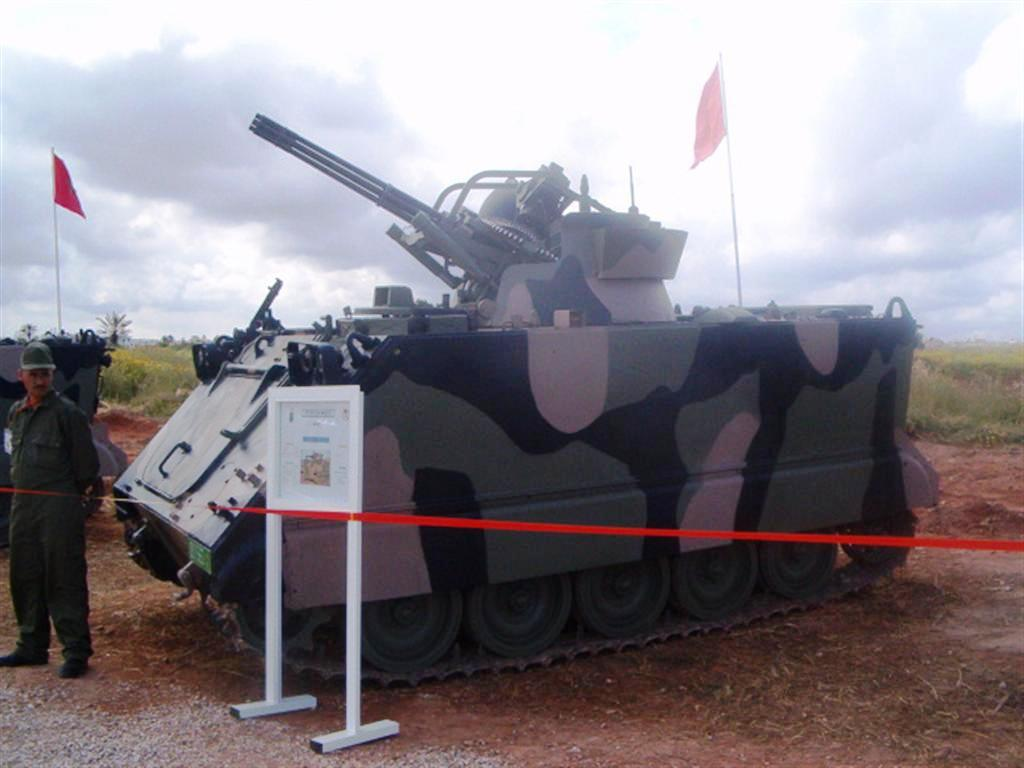
RMA's M163 VADS

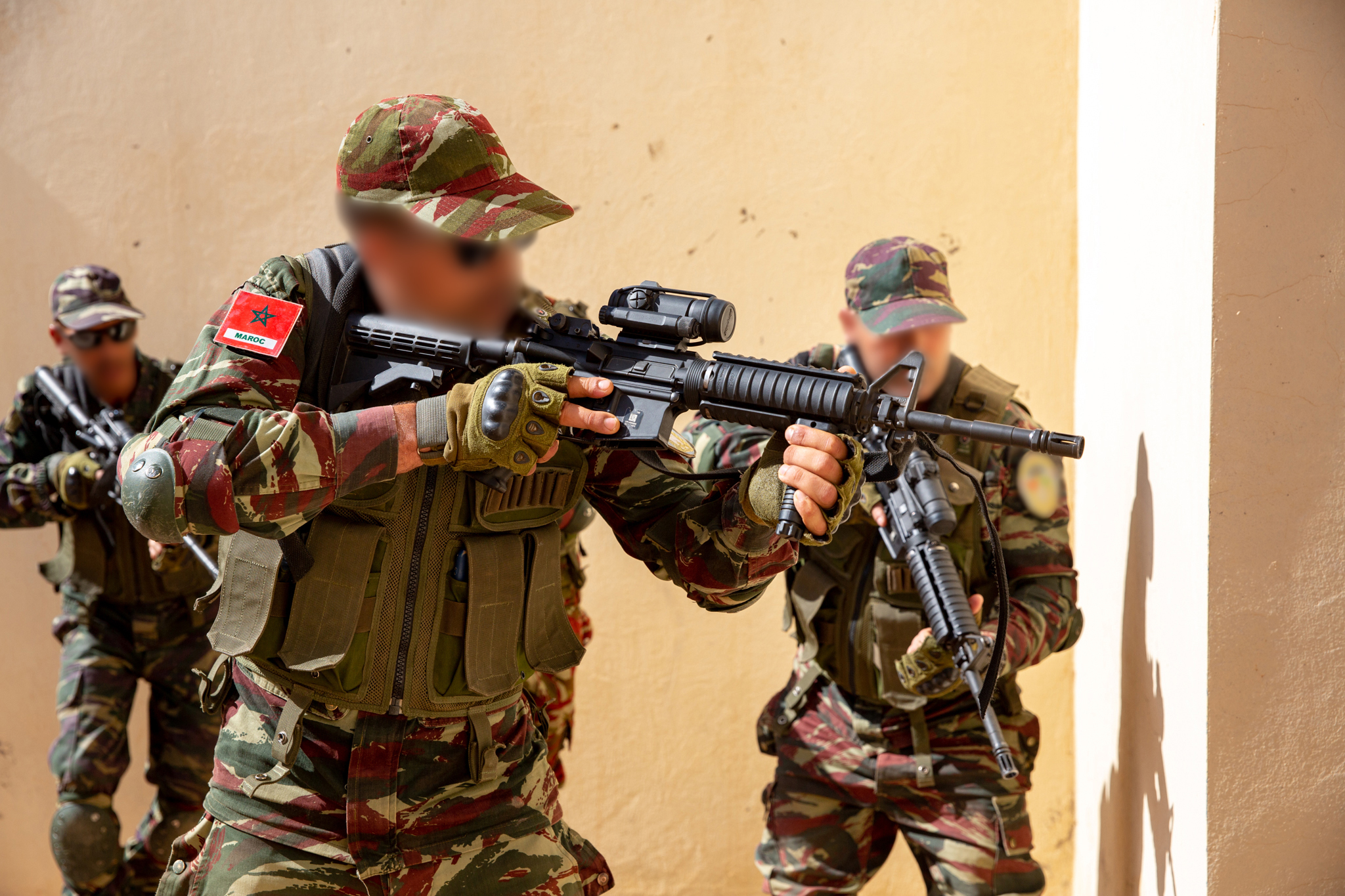
Moroccan paratrooper, African Lion 2022.

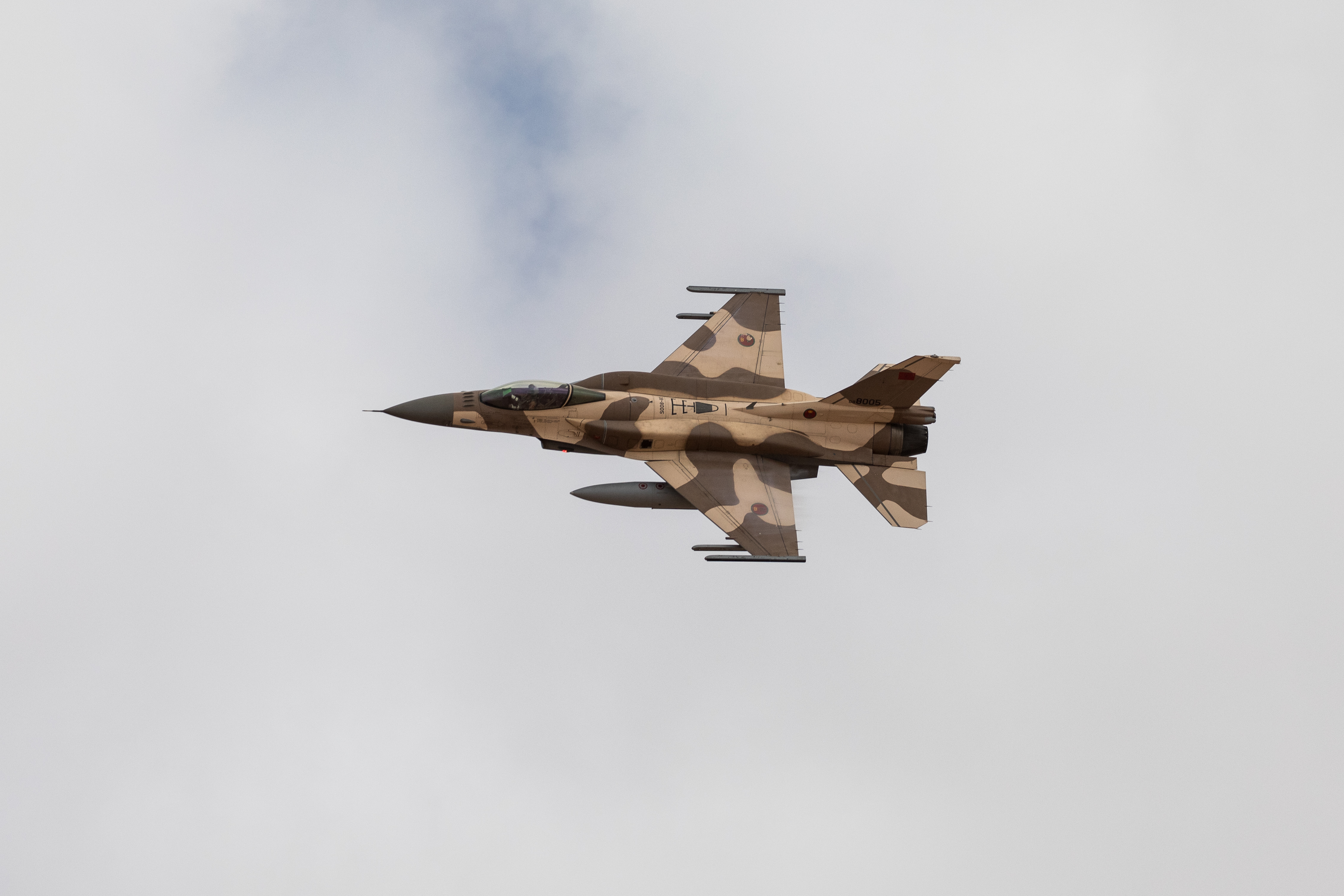
RMA's F-16C

== Uniform ==
The most common service uniform of the Royal Moroccan Army is Olive Drab BDU and woodland-type camouflage, but the Moroccan troops also wearing other types of uniforms such as the Desert lizard, Red Lizard and Camouflage Central-Europe uniforms.

Moroccan Soldiers with Olive Drab Battle Uniform and SPECTRA helmet

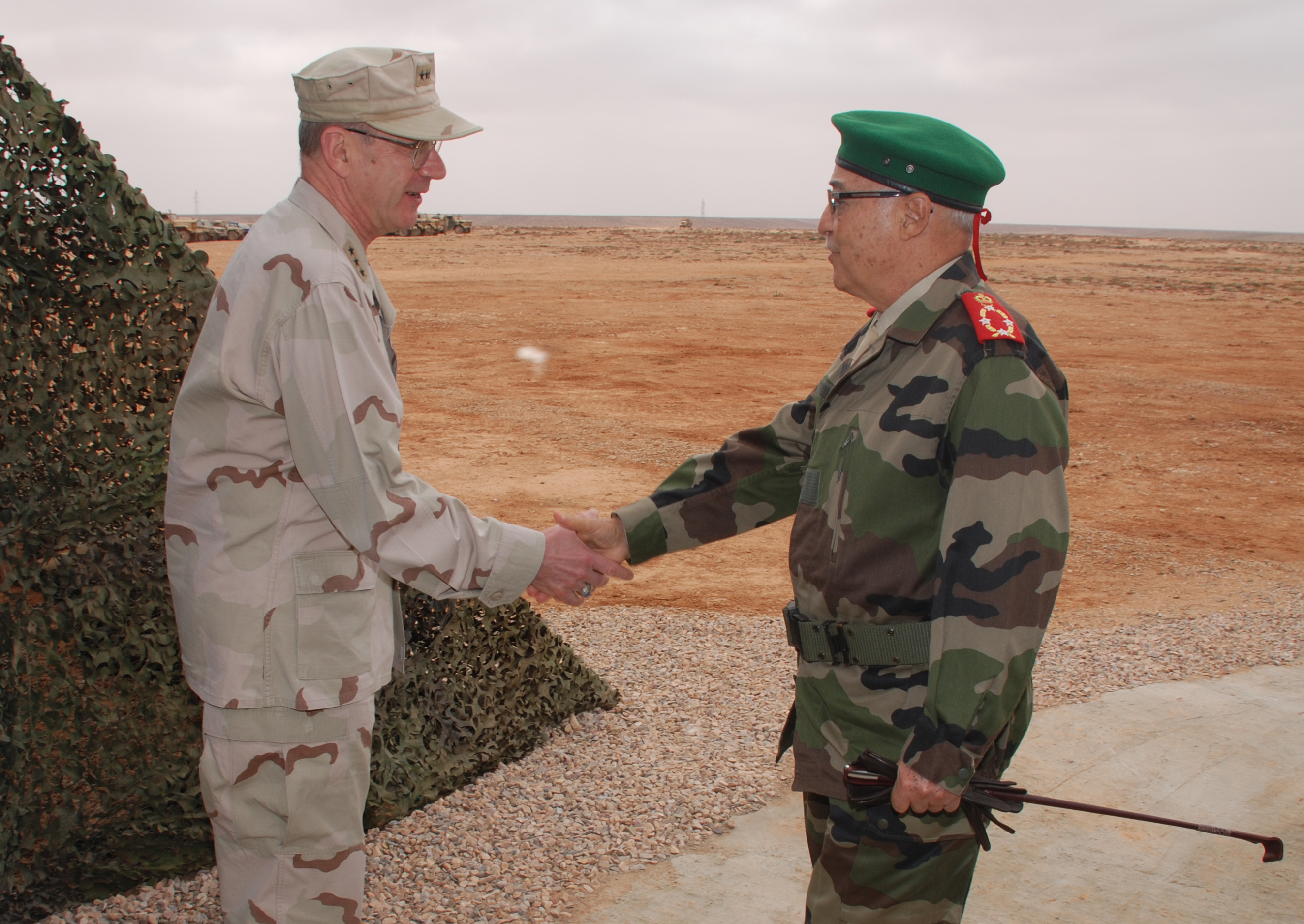
General Abdelaziz Bennani with Camouflage Central-Europe Camo Battle Uniform

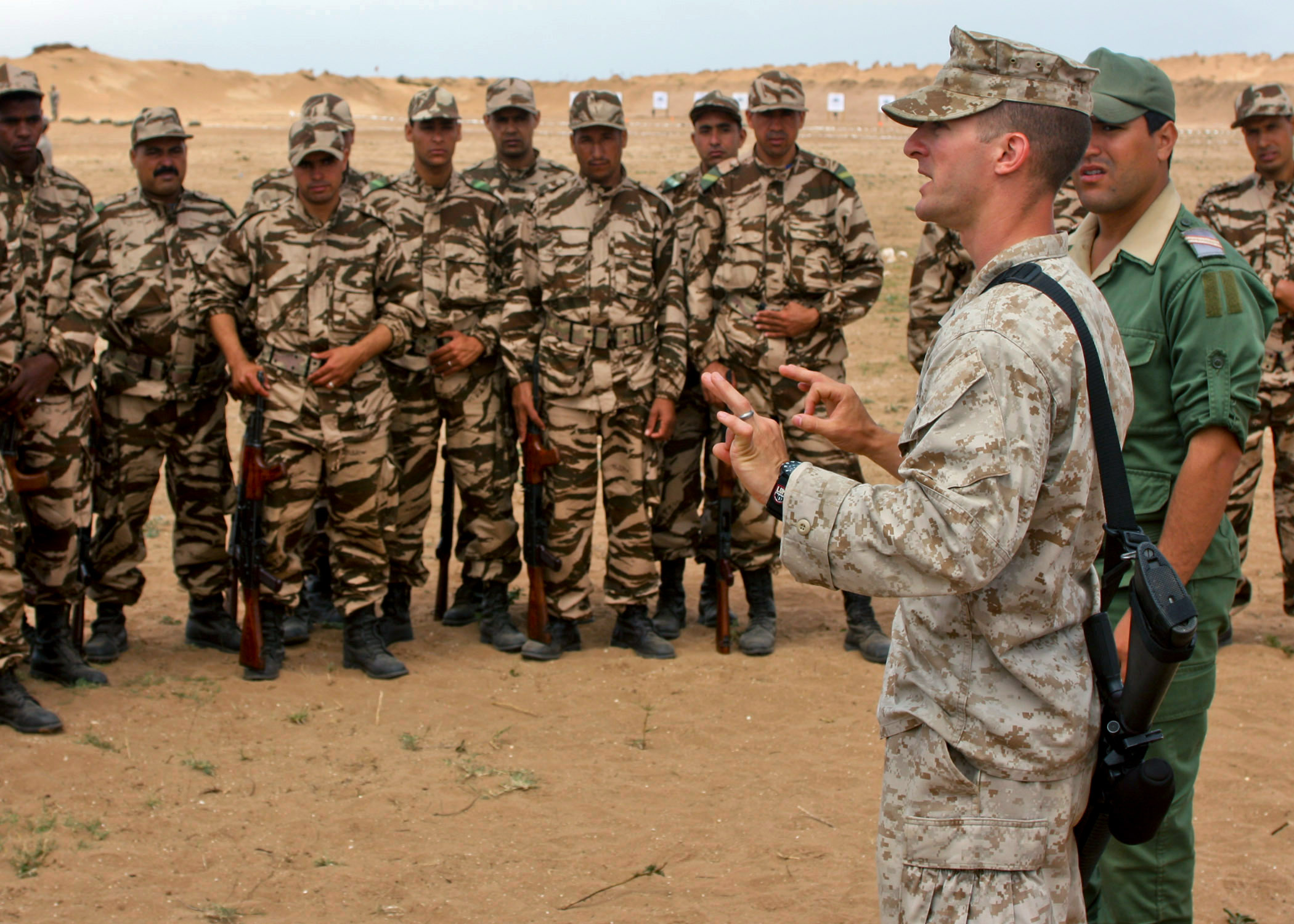
Moroccan soldiers with Desert lizard Camo Battle Uniform

== See also ==
- Royal Moroccan Armed Forces
  - Royal Moroccan Navy
  - Royal Moroccan Air Force
  - Moroccan Royal Guard
- Royal Moroccan Gendarmerie
- Auxiliary Forces
