= United Nations Security Council Resolution 2031 =

UN Security Council Resolution 2031
- Flag of the Central African Republic
- Date: 21 December 2011
- Meeting no.: 6,696
- Code: S/RES/2031 (Document)
- Subject: The situation in the Central African Republic
- Voting summary: 15 voted for; None voted against; None abstained
- Result: Adopted

Security Council composition
- Permanent members: China; France; Russia; United Kingdom; United States
- Non-permanent members: Bosnia–Herzegovina; Brazil; Colombia; Germany; Gabon; India; Lebanon; Nigeria; Portugal; South Africa

United Nations Security Council Resolution 2031 was unanimously adopted on 21 December 2011 after recalling resolution 1913 (2010). The Security Council, concerned over the security vacuum in many parts of the Central African Republic and of reports of continued human rights violations there, extended the mandate of the United Nations Peacebuilding Office in that country (BINUCA) until 31 January 2013.

== See also ==
- List of United Nations Security Council Resolutions 2001 to 2100
