= Auxiliary Forces =

Moroccan paramilitary force

- القوات المساعدة
- Motto: God, Homeland, King
- Founded: Ante 15th Century as local and territorial Military and Police forces
- Service branches: Provincial Guard; General Intervention; Support Units
- Website: https://recrutement.fa.gov.ma

Leadership
- Supreme Commander: Mohammed VI
- Minister of Interior: Abdelouafi Laftit
- Inspector General: -Mustapha Hdioud (Southern Division) -Khalid Jabran (Northern Division)

Personnel
- Military age: 18-24 years
- Active personnel: 45,000

The General Inspectorate of Auxiliary Forces (Arabic: القوات المساعدة, romanized: alquwaat almusa'ida) is a security and military institution in Morocco, under the supervision of the Ministry of Interior. It has an important role in ensuring security throughout the territory of the Kingdom.

Additionally, they contribute to maintaining internal order, acting as a border watch, and are the main backup force for firefighters during forest fires. During the Years of Lead, custody facilities such as Tazmamart and Agdz were mainly operated by elements of the auxiliary forces.

The Auxiliary forces are a continuation of a low-rank military unit composed of Senegalese Tirailleurs and Goumiers, used by the French during the protectorate area, to repress Moroccans. Since the official French police patrolled only in the European area, this unit was responsible for maintaining order in the Moroccan neighbourhoods.

== Mission and organisation ==
The Auxiliary Forces are structured into several operational and support components.

=== Territorial Units ===
Territorial units, commonly referred to as prefectural or provincial guards, ensure an administrative and security presence at the local level. They include:

- Personnel assigned to administrative structures (prefectures, provinces, districts, and caïdats);
- Units responsible for maintaining public order;
- Specialized units, including mounted units operating in tourist, mountainous, or forest areas.

=== Intervention Units ===
The Intervention Group comprises mobile Makhzen units dedicated to security and intervention missions. It includes:

- Mobile public order units;
- Border intervention units;
- Mounted or specialized units adapted to various operational environments;
- Units assigned to the protection of certain sensitive sites;
- Camel-mounted units operating in desert regions;
- Canine (K9) units.

=== Support Units ===
Support units provide the logistical and technical functions necessary for the operation of the Auxiliary Forces. Their responsibilities include:

- Logistics and supply management;
- Maintenance of equipment and vehicles;
- Technical and operational support.

=== General Organization ===
At the national level, the Auxiliary Forces are placed under the authority of two General Inspectorates corresponding to the Northern and Southern Zones. They are supported by central services and decentralized structures that ensure their deployment throughout the national territory.

== History ==
Following the Second World War, the post-war French Fourth Republic took control of the French protectorate in Morocco and, rather than releasing wounded goumiers or those who have reached retirement age, the French Army preferred to redeploy them in a subsidiary body. They performed odd jobs and assisted regular troops when needed. Officially named the mokhaznis, they were placed under the Ministry of Interior. Their missions were to suppress the various demonstrations and riots that shook the newly independent Morocco. In "time of peace," the mokhaznis provided security for official buildings and assisted in the delivery of mail in remote regions.

In 1971 and 1972, King Hassan II survived two coup attempts initiated by rebel military factions, which formed a climate of distrust evident between the monarchy and the army. This climate encouraged the growing strength of the police and the revival of the Auxiliary, put on hold since independence. The king personally nominated two senior members of the Royal Moroccan Armed Forces to head the Auxiliary Forces in 1974. The Auxiliary Forces were designated to lead in the maintenance of order and quick restoration of order in affected areas. The Auxiliary Forces were given a special status and a budget of nine billion centimes, which represented an important sum then. Two-thirds of the force were virtually incapable of military service due to age and or health reasons, the King had to recruit again and rebuild the whole force, recalls one officer who served at that time. There was no shortage of candidates but they needed to be disciplined and healthy. Initial recruitment was conducted primarily in the regions of Ouarzazate and Errachidia. The king then divided the forces' area of operation in separate districts, North and South.

=== Western Sahara War ===
When war broke out in the Sahara in 1976, the Auxiliary Forces were once again at the forefront. They were armed only with a locally manufactured version of the Beretta M3 sub-machine guns and received very little combat training and were confined by higher to their isolated bases in the middle of the desert and prevented from changing location. Consequently, they were easy prey for the Polisario fighters, and whole companies of them were slaughtered and captured.

In fact, the Moroccan army supreme command allegedly underestimated the strength of the enemy. The Forces, serving under the army officers acted as scouts, camp guards and support troops. From 1982, the Auxiliary Forces garrisons stationed at the Sahara participated, alongside the army, in the construction of the wall of defense. Later, they operated and secured prisons like Kelaat mgoun or Agdz. Several years after the 1991 cease-fire, the Forces remained essential in the management of the Sahara issue. In the mid-'90s, King Hassan II decided to give the region its first football team, he went to the local Auxiliary Forces. Founded in 1978, the Auxiliary Forces of Settat is better known as Bir Baouch, named after a village near Settat. In 1983, the team was transferred to mroud Benslimane before being called again in 1995 the Youth Sports Al Massira, the team that is now the Sahara in the national football championship.

=== Years of Lead ===
In the northern part of the kingdom, during the Years of Lead, the khaki-uniformed Auxiliary Forces were seen as a force of repression. In Fes, Nador and Casablanca, the Auxiliary Forces were accused of being responsible for several atrocities. Unlike the military, Auxiliary Forces barracks are typically located in the city center. They can be mobilized by the Governor or the Inspector General.

By the early 80s, the Auxiliary Forces were hated by the population. They represented the authority in its most abusive, more brutal form. In addition to the repression of demonstrations, the Auxiliary Forces remained close and had daily contact with the street. They were everywhere: in the souks, the prefectures, hospitals, post offices, stadiums and even at the entrance of cinemas. Simply put, they were an essential part of the state surveillance / repression apparatus.

=== Legal Framework and Institutional Reform ===
The Auxiliary Forces are one of the oldest components of Morocco’s security apparatus. Their general organizational structure and the legal status of their personnel were substantially revised by Dahir No. 1.17.71 of 15 February 2018, which repealed the 1973 and 1976 directives that had previously regulated the corps. This reform was primarily intended to modernize the Auxiliary Forces, strengthen the central services of the two General Inspectorates, establish a mechanism for coordination and monitoring between them, and improve the statutory and professional status of their personnel.

== Administration ==
In the prefectures, much of the administrative Makhzen is available to the mayors and governors. They are located throughout Moroccan cities, often at the entrance of local administrations such as prefectures. They also may be deployed at strategic locations such as busy streets and locations of mass public gatherings, where security is needed to maintain public order.

When not stationed at events or in the prefectures and wilayas, the Auxiliary Forces are assigned to border surveillance. Several units of mobile Auxiliary Forces are played guard. Along the Mediterranean coast and Spain's North African enclaves to the north, along the berm to the south and south-west in Western Sahara . In the early 90s, the units stationed along the northern coastline gained importance, since Morocco embarked on the fight against illegal immigration and drug trafficking. Personnel posted to monitor the border is risen from 3000 in 1992 to 4,500 in 2004. Recently, Morocco has employed important efforts to combat drug trafficking, in cooperation with strategic partners, such as the European Union.

== Recruitment ==
A candidate for the Auxiliary Forces must meet the following conditions:

- Have Moroccan nationality;
- Be single and at least 18 and at most 24 years old;
- Have a clean criminal record;
- Height greater than 1.70m for men and 1.65m for women;
- Have the qualifying secondary school level or holder of a professional qualification diploma for Mokhazni students, and holder of a baccalaureate certificate for Moussaidin students;
- Have a total visual power of at least 16.

== Multi-capability ==
General Hamidou Laânigri, former head of the DGSN, was appointed the head of the Auxiliary Forces in 2006. He was charged with modernizing the Auxiliary Forces and preparing them to assume new missions. Following his appointment as the Inspector General , he created a third operational area that would extend to the borders of Agadir Mauritania. The geographical distribution that exists today was adopted in 1974, when Western Sahara remained under Spanish control. Today the region accounts for nearly one-third of the national territory. Creating a third area is therefore obvious, "said a commander of the Auxiliary Forces. Since the end of the 1990s, nearly 6,000 Auxiliary Forces men are stationed along the berm or in the barracks in the south. The Sahara is still a sensitive area where law enforcement is a major challenge.

Another challenge faced by General Laânigri and other senior security officials was combatting terrorism. In 2012, Charki Draiss, the newly appointed head of the DGSN, requested reinforcements for Laânigri. Thus, joint patrols of police and auxiliary forces of elements have emerged in major cities. Between officers of FA, there is even talk of preparing a new status for their bodies, with new missions and new ways (including weapons and dogs).

== Armaments ==
Auxiliary Forces are equipped with PAMAS G1, MAS 36, MAT 49, MAC 24/29, AK-47 and FN MAG, and armed armored vehicle 32 UR 416 and Panhard AML 60.

The Moroccan Auxiliary Forces took delivery of 88 Lenco BearCat armored vehicles in riot control, troop transport, communications, convoy protection, and SWAT variants.

== Grades ==
Rank group	General / flag officers	Senior officers	Junior officers
Moroccan Auxiliary Forces
Moroccan Auxiliary Forces	Inspecteur général des Forces auxiliaires	Inspecteur principal exceptionnel	Inspecteur principal	Inspecteur

Rank group	Senior NCOs		Junior NCOs		Enlisted
Moroccan Auxiliary Forces
Moroccan Auxiliary Forces	Moussaïd principal	Moussaïd	Brigadier-chef	Brigadier	Mokhazeni

== Sources ==
- Article at Telquel-online
