= Desert warfare =

Warfare in deserts and similar arid environments

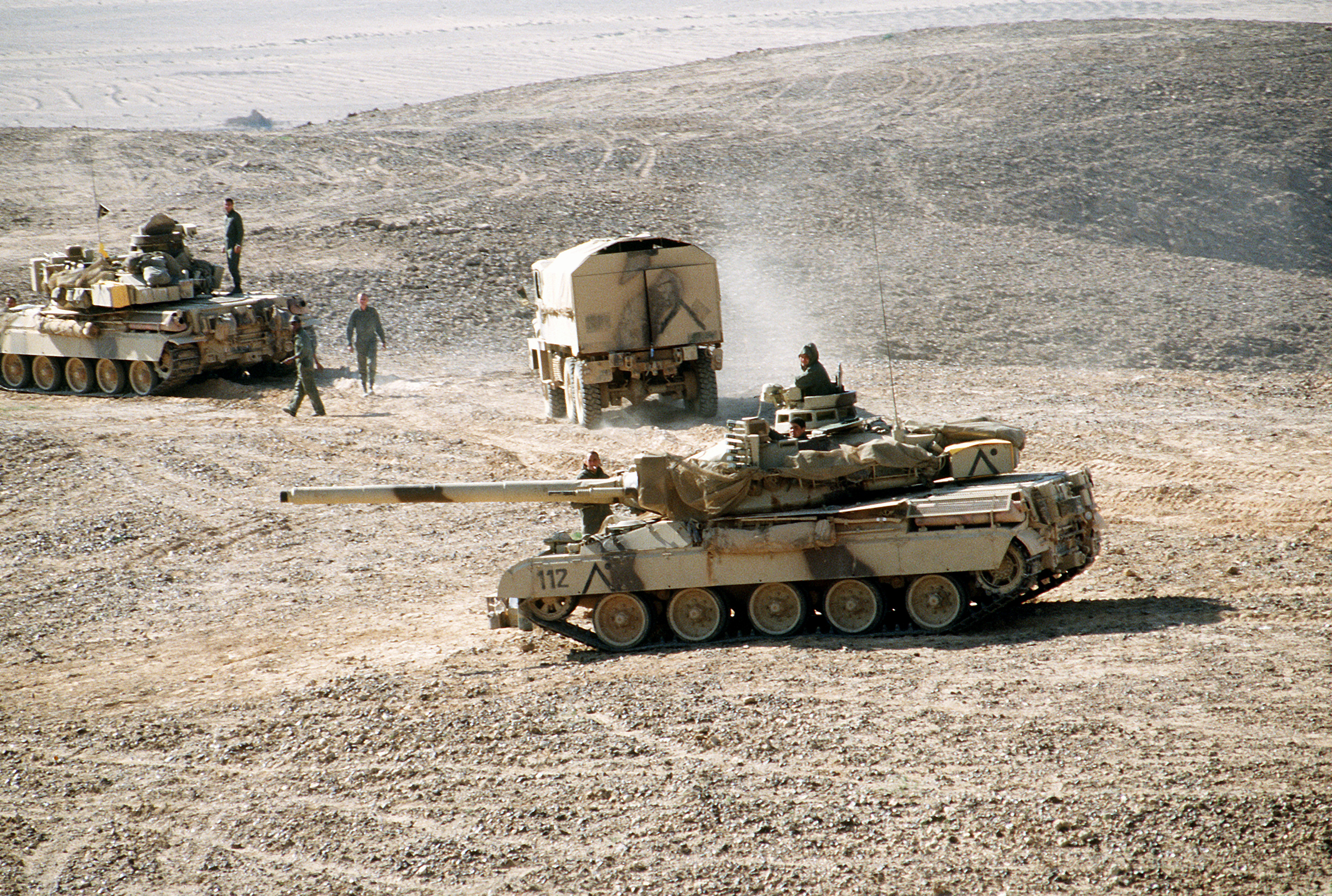
French Army combat vehicles in the deserts of Iraq during the Gulf War

Desert warfare is warfare in deserts or similar arid or semi-arid environments. The term encompasses military operations affected by the terrain, climate, and resource availability of these areas, as well as the strategies and tactics used by military forces in these situations and environments.

Desert warfare is distinct from other types of warfare in other environments and terrains, in that the desert is generally considered very inhospitable. The hot temperatures in the day and the cold temperatures in the night, the scarcity of food, water, and plant life, and the lack of cover and concealment, affect how military forces operate in desert environments. The heat and lack of water can sometimes be more dangerous than the enemy.

== Properties and tactics ==
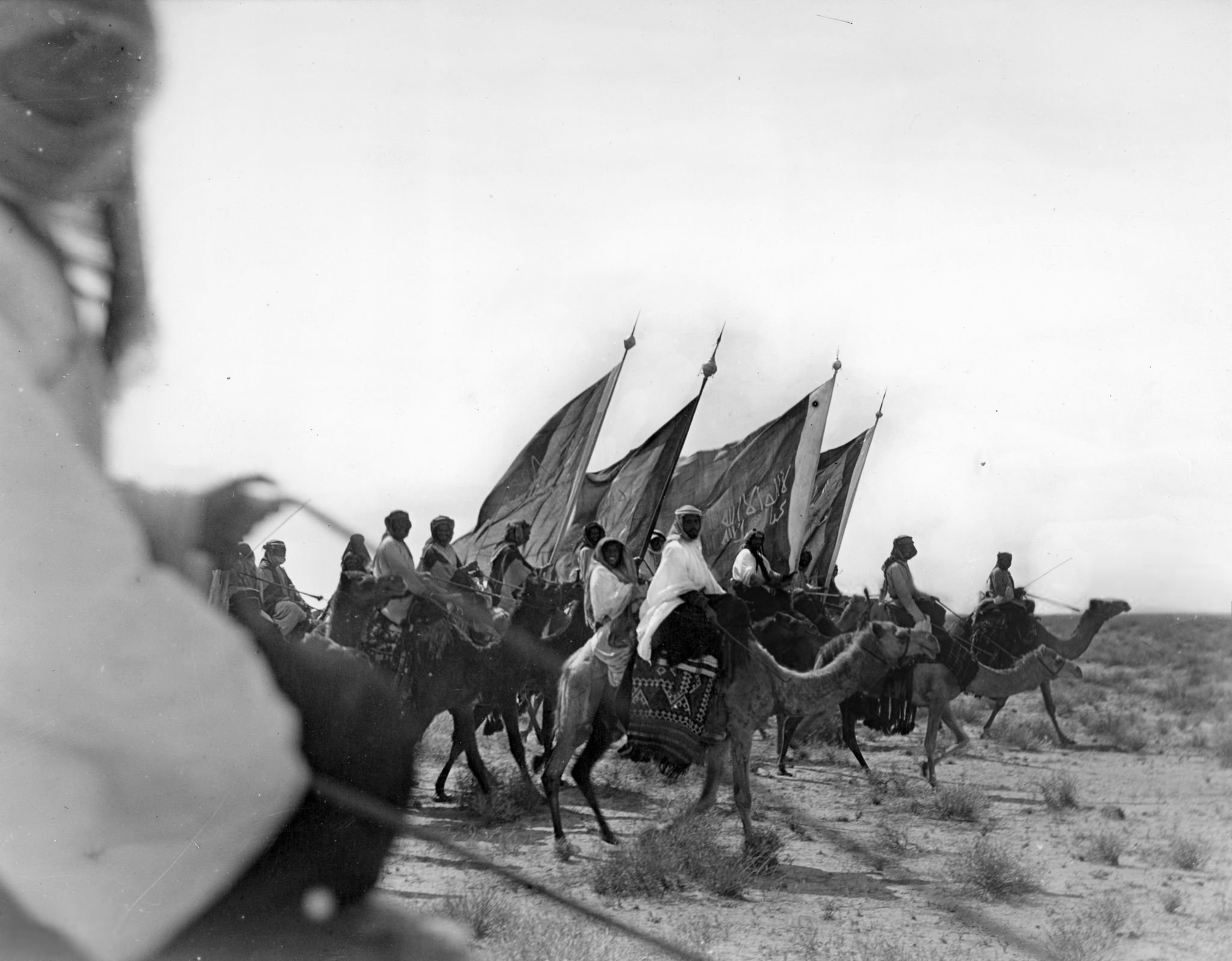
Bedouin camel cavalry of the Ikhwan army in the Arabian Peninsula, c. 1911

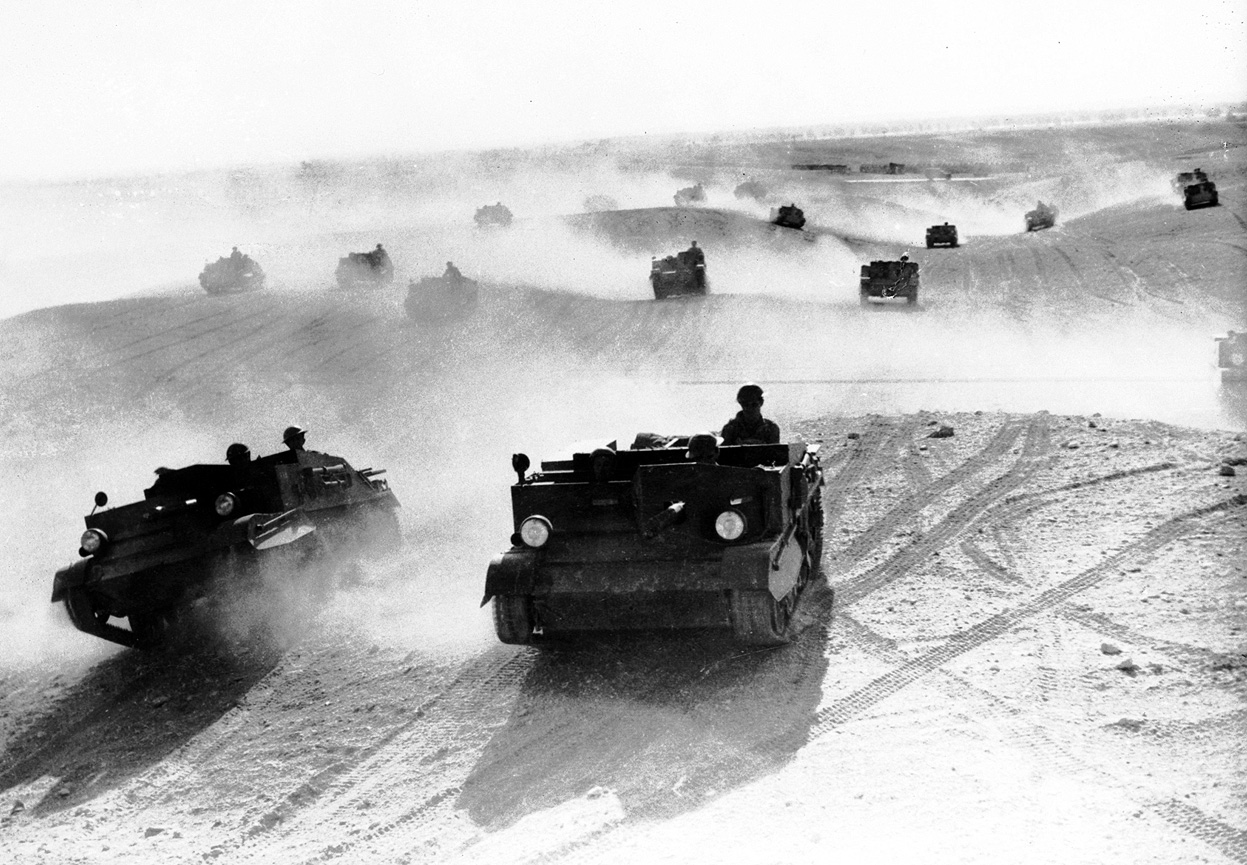
Australians driving Universal Carriers across dunes towards Bardia, Libya, January 1941

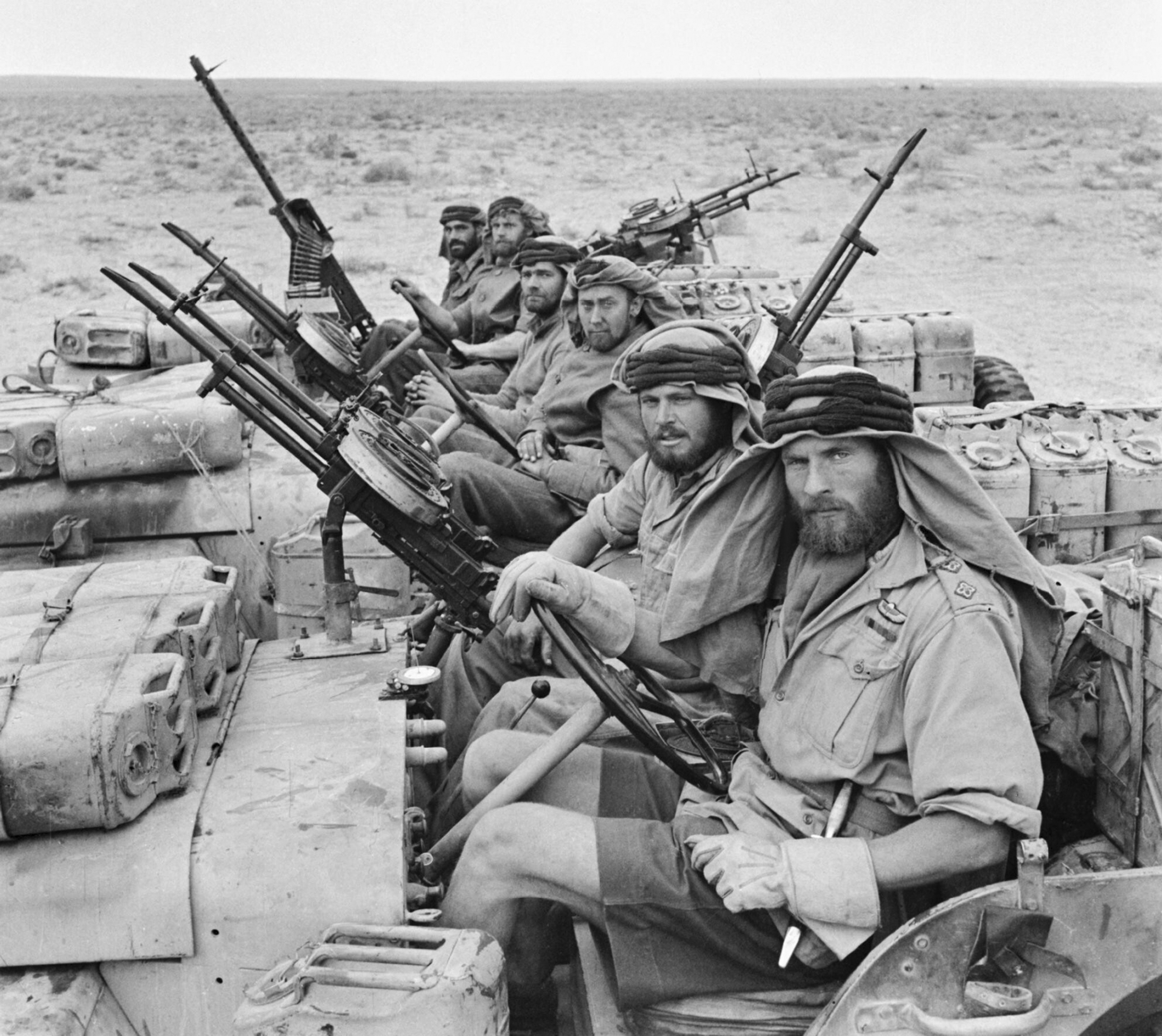
British SAS patrol in armed jeeps during the North African campaign of World War II

The barrenness of the desert makes the capture of key cities essential to ensure the ability to maintain control over important resources, primarily clean water, and being able to keep a military well supplied. As such, that makes sieges in conventional warfare more frequent, as the defender often prepares entrenched positions to protect the cities that supply them.

=== Camouflage and cover ===
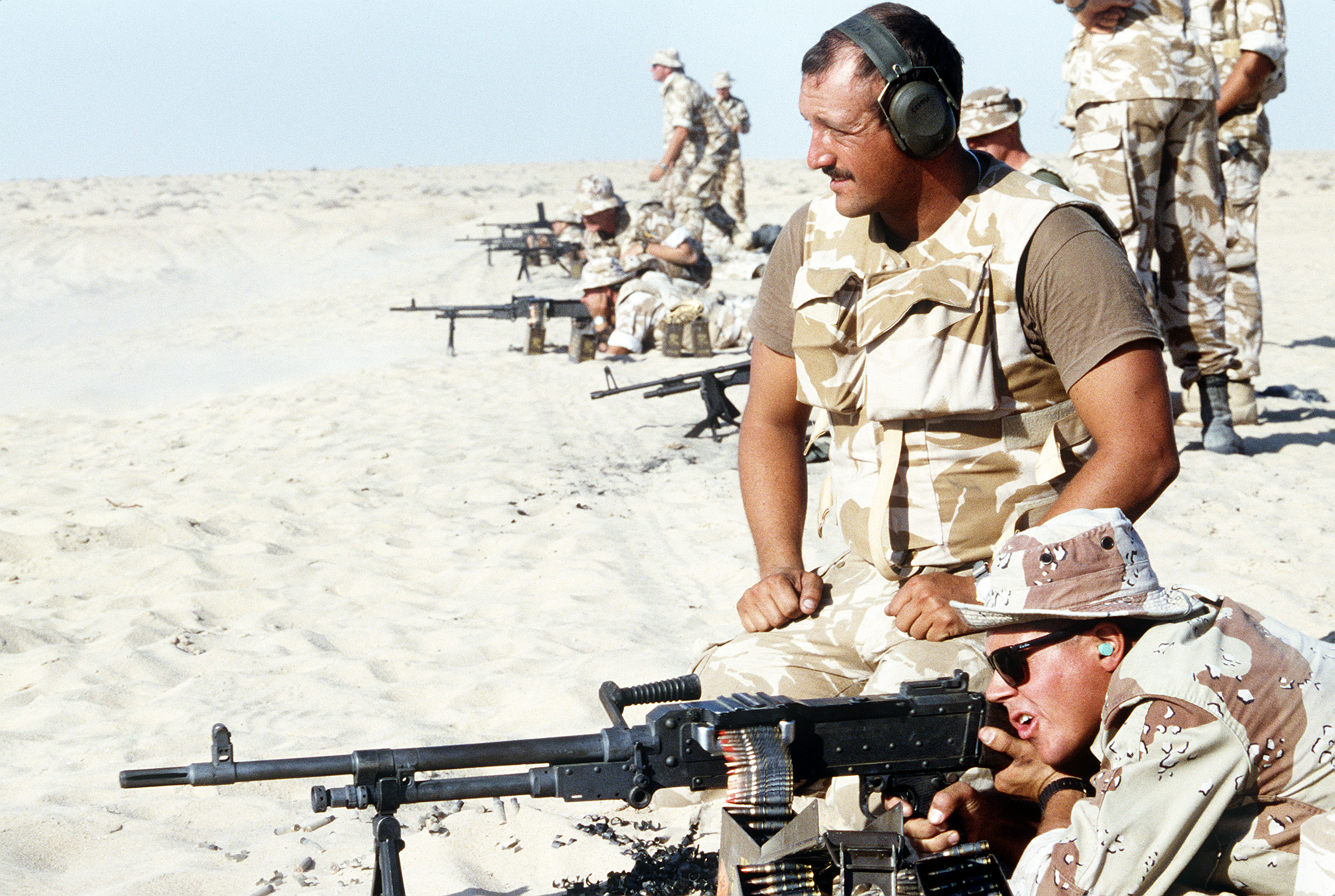
British and American soldiers wearing Desert Battle Dress Uniform during the Gulf War

Many deserts have limited numbers of noticeable landmarks, which can make maneuvering through a desert difficult in terms of navigation and logistics. A lack of structures and objects can also make effective use of camouflage, cover, and concealment difficult.

=== Mobility ===
Mobility is essential to a successful desert war, which explains the heavy use of armor in battles such as in the First and Second Battle of El Alamein during the North African campaign of World War II. It has been noted that mobility is so important in desert warfare that battles can sometimes begin to resemble naval engagements, since the actual possession of territory is less important than the positions of one's tanks (or ships).

Unlike other types of terrain, which depend on roads, movement in deserts is often possible in all directions because of the wide open spaces. However, the resource-scarce desert environment means that availability of supplies can greatly constrict movement. Militaries often make use of cavalry to cross the large expanses of a harsh desert without increasing the exertion of the soldiers, who are already at a higher risk of dehydration because of the high temperatures during the day.

There are many enemies to the desert fighter. They include aircraft and tanks, which can be extremely menacing to desert guerrillas because there is little way to equal such force. Additionally, there are few places to hide from such weapons in the desert environment since there are few obstructions.

Another problem is the sand dunes, which can greatly affect mobility. With no firm and stable ground footing, it is easy to slide down or even get buried.

=== Water scarcity ===
Lack of water and extreme heat can also cause complications in engaging in desert warfare. Military personnel consume much higher quantities of water in the desert from perspiration and so troop movements are often limited by water carrying capacity. The scarcity of water may lead to bases moving from one position to another to look for a water source.

=== Harassing supply lines ===
In the context of guerilla warfare, the wide expanses of deserts can make it more difficult for large forces to defend their supply lines. Guerilla forces can use ambushes to their advantage and make their adversary deploy forces to protect railways or other infrastructure at great cost. That tactic was successfully used by T. E. Lawrence during the Arab Revolt against the Ottoman Empire.

== Health effects ==
=== Body temperature ===
In desert warfare, an individual's body temperature can reach unusual highs causing fever-like weakness and dehydration.

=== Dehydration ===
An individual may have to face conditions of dehydration in desert warfare because of the lack of edible fluids and clean water.

=== Fatigue ===
Fatigue and bodily stress caused by the heat can cause very serious discomfort.

=== Glare ===
Sunlight can irritate eyesight or reduce visibility.

== Examples ==
=== Battles ===
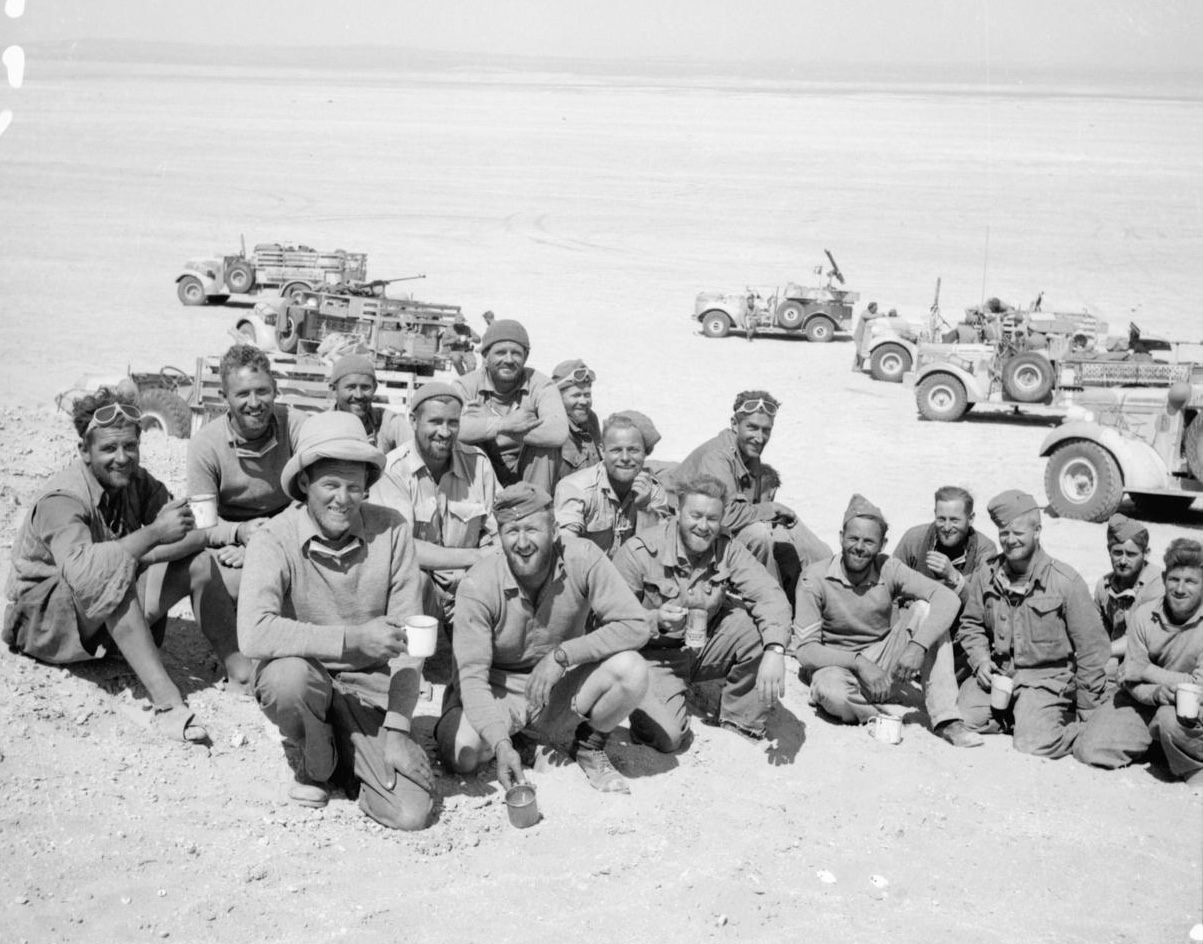
New Zealand members of the Long Range Desert Group in North Africa

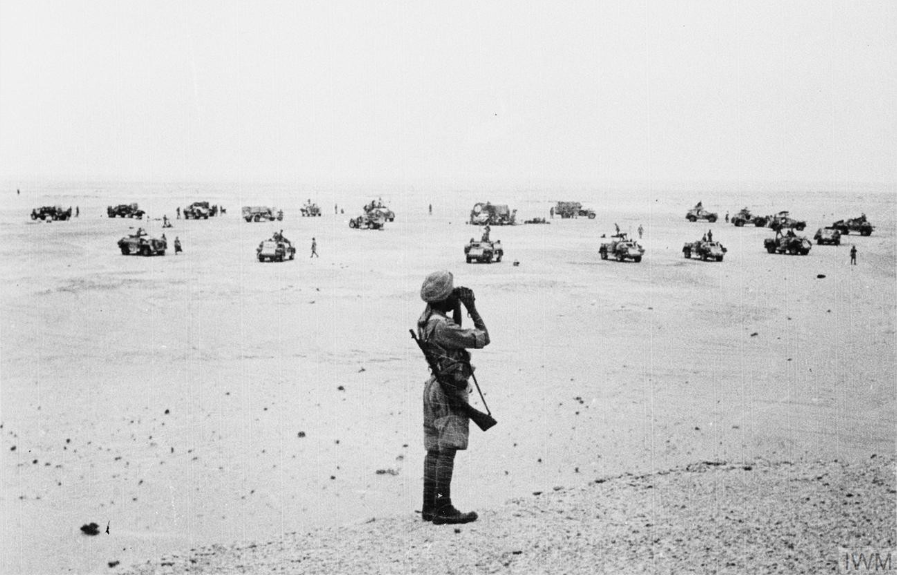
Indian transport raiders searching for enemy targets during the Western Desert Campaign of World War II

- Hajj caravan raid (924)
- Hajj caravan raid (1757)
- Battle of the Pyramids (1798)
- Battle of Omdurman (1898)
- Battle of El-Moungar (1903)
- Battle of Beersheba (1917)
- Battle of Gazala (1942)
- First Battle of El Alamein (1942)
- Second Battle of El Alamein (1942)
- Battle of Asal Uttar (1965)
- Battle of Longewala (1971)

=== Wars ===
- Muslim–Quraysh War (624–630)
- Saadian invasion of the Songhai Empire (1590–1599)
- Char Bouba war (1644–1674)
- French campaign in Egypt and Syria (1798–1801)
- Ottoman–Saudi War (1811–1818)
- War of the Pacific in the Atacama Desert (1879–1884)
- Anglo-Somali War (1900–1920)
- Middle Eastern theatre of World War I (1914–1918)
- Military operations in North Africa during World War I (1914–1918)
- Second Italo-Senussi War (1923–1932)
- Middle Eastern and North African theatres of World War II (1939–1945)
- Sand War (1963)
- Indo-Pakistani War of 1965
- Six-Day War (1967)
- Indo-Pakistani War of 1971
- Yom Kippur War (1973)
- Western Sahara War (1973–1991)
- Iran–Iraq War (1980–1988)
- Chadian–Libyan War (1978–1987)
- Gulf War (1990–1991)
- Iraq War (2003–2011)
- 2011 Libyan civil war (2011)
- Syrian Civil War (2011–2024)
- Tuareg rebellion (2012)
- War in Iraq (2013–2017)

=== Current conflicts ===
- Somali Civil War (1991–present)
- Insurgency in the Maghreb (2002–present)
- Mali War (2012–present)
- Nomadic conflict
