= Sand War =

1963 conflict between Algeria and Morocco

- Part of the Arab Cold War and the Cold War
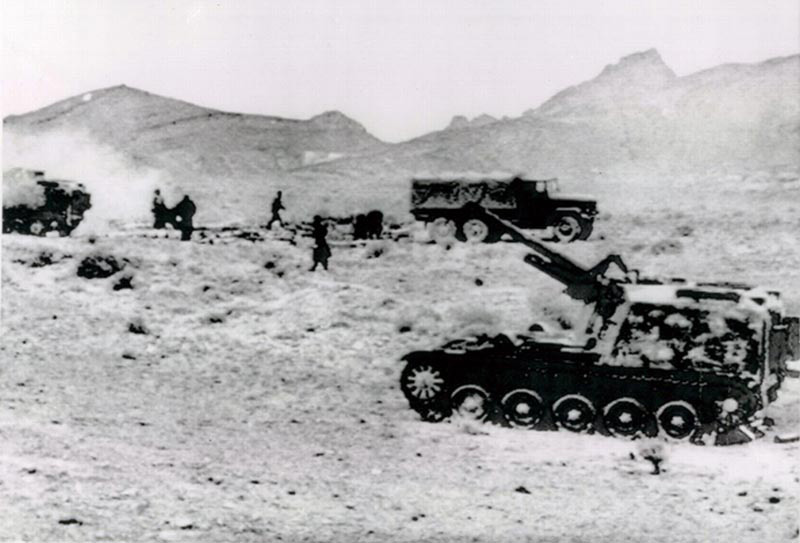
- Moroccan Mk 61 105 mm self-propelled howitzer, c. 1963
Date	September 25, 1963 – February 20, 1964 (4 months, 3 weeks and 5 days)
Location	Around the oasis towns of Tindouf and Figuig
Result	Military stalemate: The closing of the border south of Figuig, Morocco/Béni Ounif, Algeria.; Morocco abandoned its attempts to control Béchar and Tindouf after OAU mediation.; Demilitarized zone established
Territorial changes	No territorial changes

Belligerents
Morocco; Support: France; United States	Algeria; Support: Egypt; Cuba; Soviet Union

Commanders and leaders
Hassan II; (Morocco) Driss Alami; (Morocco) Colonel Habibi	Ahmed Ben Bella; (Algeria) Houari Boumédiène

Strength
Unknown	Unknown

Casualties and losses
39 killed 57 captured or: 200 killed	60 killed 250 wounded or: 300 killed 379 captured

The Sand War (Arabic: حَرْبُ الرِّمَال, romanized: Ḥarb ar-Rimāl) was a border conflict between Algeria and Morocco fought from September 25 to October 30, 1963, although a formal peace treaty was not signed until February 20, 1964. It resulted largely from the Moroccan government's claim to portions of Algeria's Tindouf and Béchar provinces. The Sand war led to heightened tensions between the two countries for several decades.

Full-blown confrontation began on September 25, 1963, once Moroccan forces occupied the border towns of Hassi Beida and Tindjoub, beginning a battle with Algerian forces for control over the towns. In the north, Algeria opened a front near Ich, while Morocco launched an offensive towards Tindouf in the south. Cuban troops arrived in Algeria to prepare for an offensive into eastern Morocco, prompting Morocco to prepare for a second offensive towards Tindouf. However, both attacks were suspended, and a ceasefire was officially declared on October 30, 1963. This ceasefire marked the first multinational peacekeeping mission conducted by the Organisation of African Unity. A formal peace treaty was eventually signed on February 20, 1964.

== Background ==
Three factors contributed to the outbreak of the conflict: the absence of a precise delineation of the border between Algeria and Morocco, the discovery of important mineral resources in the disputed area, and the Moroccan irredentism fueled by the Greater Morocco ideology of the Istiqlal Party and Allal al-Fassi.

=== Pre-colonial era ===
Before French colonization of the region in the nineteenth century, part of what is now southern and western Algeria was under Moroccan influence, and no border was defined. In the Treaty of Lalla Maghnia (March 18, 1845), which set the border between French Algeria and Morocco, it is stipulated that "a territory without water is uninhabitable and its boundaries are superfluous" and the border is delineated over only 165 km. Beyond that there is only one border area, without limit, punctuated by tribal territories attached to Morocco or Algeria.

In the 1890s, the French administration and military called for the annexation of the Tuat region. Tuat owed religious and tributary allegiance to the Sultans of Morocco, although it was separated from both Algeria and Morocco by a largely uninhabited desert.

The French 19th Army Corps' Oran and Algiers Divisions fought the Aït Khabbash, a fraction of the Aït Ounbgui khams of the Aït Atta confederation. The Moroccan viceroy of Tafilalt, who was in charge of collecting tribute from the region, refrained from interfering in the conflict, and the local tribes were left to fend for themselves. Although the Moroccan state did not interfere in the annexation of the Tuat region, several Moroccan tribes independently sent volunteers to fight against the French. The conflict ended with the annexation of the Touat-Gourara-Tidikelt complex by France in 1901.

=== Colonial era ===
In 1903, France also began expanding westwards towards Béchar and Tindouf. They defeated the local tribesmen at the Battle of Taghit and the Battle of El-Moungar although they did not annex the region into French Algeria. The borders around the region were loosely defined.

After Morocco became a French protectorate in 1912, the French administration set borders between the two territories, but the tracks were often misidentified (Varnier line in 1912, Trinquet line in 1938) and varied from one map to another since for the French administration, they were not international borders and the area was virtually uninhabited. The discovery of large deposits of oil and minerals (iron, manganese) in the region led France to define more precisely the territories, and in 1952 the French decided to integrate Tindouf and Colomb-Béchar into the French departments of Algeria.

In 1956, France relinquished its protectorate in Morocco, which immediately demanded the return of the disputed departments, especially Tindouf. The French government refused.

=== Algerian War and Independence ===
During the Algerian War, Morocco backed the National Liberation Front, Algeria's leading nationalist movement, in its guerrilla campaign against the French. However, one of the FLN's primary objectives was to prevent France from splitting the strategic Sahara regions from a future Algerian state. It was, therefore, disinclined to support Morocco's historical claims to Tindouf and Bechar or the concept of a Greater Morocco.

Upon Algerian independence, the FLN announced it would apply the principle of uti possidetis to pre-existing colonial borders. King Hassan II of Morocco visited Algiers in March 1963 to discuss the undefined borders, but Algeria's President Ahmed Ben Bella believed the matter should be resolved at a later date. Ben Bella's fledgling administration was still attempting to rebuild the country after the enormous damage caused by the Algerian War and was preoccupied with an insurgency by the FFS, led by Hocine Aït Ahmed, opposed to Ben Bella's autocratic rule. Algerian authorities suspected that Morocco was inciting the revolt, and Hassan II was anxious about his own opposition's reverence for Algeria, which escalated tensions between the nations. Those factors prompted Hassan to begin moving troops towards Tindouf.

== Armies and weapons ==
=== Algeria ===
The Algerian military, recently formed from the guerrilla ranks of the FLN's National Liberation Army (ALN), was still oriented towards asymmetric warfare, and had few heavy weapons. Its logistics was also complicated by its vast array of largely-obsolete weapons from a number of diverse sources, including France, Germany, Czechoslovakia, and the United States. The Algerian Army had ordered a large number of AMX-13 light tanks from France in 1962, but at the time of fighting, only twelve were in service. Ironically, at least four AMX-13s had also been donated by Morocco a year earlier. The Soviet Union supplied Algeria with ten T-34 tanks, but they were equipped for clearing minefields and were delivered without turrets or armament. The Algerian army also lacked trucks, aircraft, and jeeps. In 1963, the size of the Algerian army was 48,000 troops and it had a military budget of $66 million.

=== Morocco ===
The Moroccan military was smaller but comparatively well-equipped and frequently took advantage of its superior firepower on the battlefield. They possessed forty T-54 main battle tanks that they had purchased from the Soviet Union, twelve SU-100 tank destroyers, seventeen AMX-13s, and a fleet of gun-armed Panhard EBR armored cars. Morocco also possessed modern strike aircraft unlike Algeria. In 1963, the army had 34,843 troops and a military budget of $94 million.

== Course of the war ==
1963 American news footage from the conflict

=== Battles of Hassi Beida and Tindjoub ===
Weeks of skirmishes along the border eventually escalated into a full-blown confrontation on September 25, 1963, with intense fighting around the oasis towns of Tindouf and Figuig. The Royal Moroccan Army soon crossed into Algeria in force and succeeded in taking the two border posts of Hassi Beida and Tindjoub. On October 5, representatives from Morocco and Algeria convened at Oujda to negotiate but were unable to find a solution. The Moroccans were determined to adjust the border, and the Algerians would not allow it, which resulted in an impasse. Morocco mobilized 30,000 to 40,000 men, while Algeria mobilized a similar amount.

The Algerian forces began to retaliate against the Moroccan advances by taking back the posts of Hassi Beida and Tindjoub on October 8 and killing 10 Moroccan soldiers. Morocco claimed that this Algerian attack caused it 20 injuries and 80 disappeared. This prompted further attempts at negotiations, but these proved ineffectual as well.

The capture of Hassi Beida involved 1,000 Moroccan soldiers under the command of Colonel Habibi, who started from bases near Ouarzazate. Moroccan infantry advanced along camel roads until 4:00 a.m. The battle involved mortars and heavy machine guns. Tinjoub held out for about 2 hours until 7:30 a.m, while Hassi Beida held out for another hour. The larger Moroccan Army retook the two posts during the week of October 14, killing at least 10 Algerians in the process. The Algerians retreated to Tinfouchy. During the battle, there were 1,000 Moroccan troops armed with bazookas, recoilless cannons, heavy machine guns and tanks. It is asserted that 3,000 Algerian troops took part in the battle. Little use of air power has been reported, except for an Algerian plane that bombarded Oued Zeknou. This battle cut the route from Bechar to Tindouf and the passage of caravans through the area.

Algeria was strongly disadvantaged as the front was within the range of the Saharan military district of Morocco and accessible to logistical support, but the fighting took place 750 miles away from the capital, Algiers, and Algerian troops were committed to suppressing the Socialist Forces Front rebellion in the region of Kabylia, which Algeria eventually succeeded in suppressing. On October 15, Ben Bella called for a remobilization of the National Liberation Army to repel the Moroccan invaders. Negotiations for a ceasefire failed again in Marrakesh on October 15–17.

On October 20, Moroccan spokesmen reported the capture of an Algerian Army helicopter with five Egyptian officers on board. On October 23, Moroccan soldiers tried to attack the town of Hassi-Taghucht post, 90 km south of Tauz, and Algerian units tried to encircle and attack the town of Usada, 10 km from Zedgu. However, both attacks were repulsed. The Algerian Army launched another counterattack against Hassi Beida with heavy material, however it withdrew after being repulsed, leaving almost a hundred dead on the ground.

=== Reactions to the outbreak of war ===
Border between Morocco and Algeria in 1963

Despite internal discontent with the Algerian government, most of the country supported the war effort, which Algerians generally perceived as an act of Moroccan aggression. Even in regions in which Ben Bella's regime remained deeply unpopular, such as Kabylia, the population offered to take up arms against the Moroccan invaders. Morocco's invasion proved to be a diplomatic blunder, as the other Arab and African states refused to recognize its border claims. In late October, Egypt (United Arab Republic) began sending about 1,000 troops and defense hardware to bolster the Algerian military, and Egyptian forces engaged in combat alongside the Algerians.

Morocco's Western allies provided assistance after its formal requests for military aid. The United States feared the escalation and internationalization of the war, particularly wanting to avoid Soviet intervention, and therefore advocated for the peaceful resolution of the conflict. The United States opposed Hassan's interpretation of inter-Arab rivalry's effect on North Africa. Despite Hassan's request, France, Spain, and the United States refused to provide him with military assistance in an effort to isolate the conflict. Ben Bella claimed that the conflict had been deliberately provoked by "feudal" Morocco with the encouragement of the United States in order to crush Algeria's socialist revolution.

=== Northern front ===
On October 18, the Algerians opened a new front along the border in the north, near the more highly developed Mediterranean region of northern Algeria and in a portion of the border that was not contested by Morocco. That represented the first intensification of the hostilities and enlarged the war to the north. On October 18, the Algerians attacked the town of Ich, a border oasis 80 miles northeast of Figuig, which forced the Moroccans to withdraw. The Moroccan casualties were a few dozen missing. On the next day, the Algerians bombarded the Tindrara region in Oujda province.

=== Tindouf offensive ===
On October 13, 1963, Moroccan ground units launched a major offensive on Tindouf. It stalled from unexpectedly stubborn resistance from the town's Algerian and Egyptian garrison.

On October 28, 1963, Moroccan forces had planned a second offensive on Tindouf and occupied positions about 4 km from the settlement. However, Hassan was reluctant to authorise it for fear that another battle would prompt further military intervention from Algeria's allies.

=== Cuban arrival ===
On October 22, hundreds of Cuban troops arrived at Oran. The troops were sent at the request of Ben Bella though he would later deny that in 1997. Just years after the victory of their own revolution, many Cubans identified with the Algerians and were eager to support them. They also suspected that Washington was hoping that the war would precipitate Ben Bella's downfall, which Fidel Castro was determined to prevent. For those reasons, the Cuban government formed the Grupo Especial de Instrucción, which was sent to Algeria. Its forces included twenty-two T-34 tanks, eighteen 120-mm mortars, a battery of 57-mm recoilless rifles, anti-aircraft artillery with eighteen guns, and eighteen 122mm field guns with the crews to operate them. The unit was made up of 686 men under the command of Efigenio Ameijeiras.

Although they were initially described as an advisory contingent to train the Algerian Army, Castro also authorized their deployment in combat actions to safeguard Algeria's territorial integrity. The Cubans offloaded their equipment and transported it to the southwestern front by rail. The troops provided training to the Algerians, and their medical team offered the population free healthcare. While Castro had hoped to keep Cuba's intervention covert, and a number of the Cuban personnel wore Algerian uniforms, they were observed by French military and diplomatic staff in Oran, and word of their presence soon leaked to the Western press.

=== Operation Dignidad ===
Algeria and Cuba planned a major counteroffensive, Operation Dignidad, aimed at driving the Moroccan forces back across the border and capturing Berguent. From Oran, the Cuban military with armored vehicles on a train of 12 wagons and 42 open platforms travelled 70 km southwest to the city of Sidi Bel Abbes, and then another 10 km along the road to the border town of Ras El Ma, where they settled in Bedo barracks. The Cuban military immediately began preparations for battle. Ameijeiras, Bravo and other senior officers went to the city of Colomb-Bechar, where the headquarters of the Algerian Minister of Defense Houari Boumédiène was located. By then, the Algerian military had already developed a strategy to confront the Moroccans. At a command meeting in Colomb-Béchar, Defense Minister Boumédiène set the task of capturing as many of the border areas of Morocco as possible, which would allow Algeria to negotiate from a position of strength. Efigenio Ameijeiras resolutely declared, "We won't stop until we get to Casablanca."

On the evening of October 28, 1963, the commander of the tank battalion, Captain Melquiades Gonzalez, reported to Ameijeiras that the T-34s were ready for the offensive. It was scheduled for the early hours of October 29. However, Ben Bella suspended the attack at 1:00 a.m. to proceed with negotiations to end the war peacefully.

=== Ceasefire ===
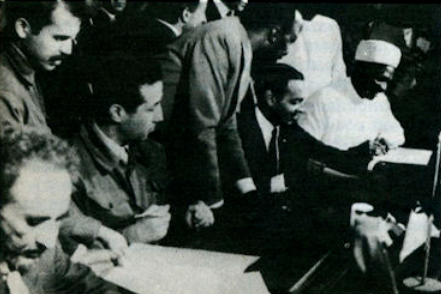
Ahmed Ben Bella, Hassan II and Haile Selassie during the Bamako Accords

Multiple actors, including the Arab League, Tunisia's Habib Bourguiba, Libya's King Idris, and Ethiopia's Emperor Haile Selassie, sought to moderate negotiations. Egypt's Gamal Abdel Nasser sent a letter to Hassan II to urge him to stop the fighting. In his message, he condemned the Moroccan attack and justified his support for Algeria and suggested a ceasefire and both armies returning to their positions prior to the 8 October attack. The United Nations received many pleas to issue a ceasefire appeal, but Secretary-General U Thant wanted to allow regional initiatives to pursue a solution.

On October 10, the Arab League called for a withdrawal of troops and reconciliation. On October 29, Hassan and Ben Bella met to negotiate in Bamako, Mali, joined by Emperor Selassie and Mali's Modibo Keïta. After the four leaders met alone on October 30, a truce was declared. The accord mandated a ceasefire for November 2 and announced that a commission consisting of Moroccan, Algerian, Ethiopian, and Malian officers would decide the boundaries of a demilitarized zone. It was also determined that an Ethiopian and Malian team would observe the neutrality of the demilitarized zone. Finally, the accord suggested an immediate gathering of the Foreign Ministers of the Organisation of African Unity (OAU). The meeting would be held to set up a commission to determine who was responsible for starting the war and to examine the frontier question and suggest methods for bringing about a lasting settlement of the conflict.

=== Battle of Figuig ===
The ceasefire was almost jeopardized on November 1, when Algerian troops assaulted a village near Figuig and positioned themselves against the town's airport. Surrounded by Algerians, the town was assaulted by infantry and artillery. The Moroccans claimed to have beaten them off. The town has been under heavy shell fire and the number of dead civilians was reported to be at least 60. Fighting continued for two days after a cease-fire was to have taken effect, and Morocco reportedly pressed for the United Nations Security Council to consider the Algerian-Moroccan border dispute. According to The New York Times, the Algerian artillery barrage at the border town appeared to have erased the ceasefire agreement.

The attack was denounced and dramatized by the Moroccan government. Algerian Foreign Minister Abdelaziz Bouteflika expressed confidence that "wisdom will triumph" and that Algeria and Morocco would end renewed border fighting near the Moroccan town of Figuig. A Malian officer arrived on November 4 and enforced the Bamako Accord, ending the hostilities.

=== Peace treaty ===
The OAU mediated a formal peace treaty on February 20, 1964. The treaty was signed in Mali following a number of preliminary discussions between Hassan and Ben Bella. The agreement's terms included a reaffirmation of the previously established borders in Algeria's favor and the restoration of the status quo. The demilitarized zone was maintained in the meantime and was monitored by the OAU's first multinational peacekeeping force.

== Casualties ==
French sources reported Algerian casualties to be 60 dead and 250 wounded, with later works giving a number of 300 Algerian dead. Morocco officially reported to have suffered 39 dead. Moroccan losses were probably lower than the Algerians' but are unconfirmed, with later sources reporting 200 Moroccan dead. About 57 Moroccans and 379 Algerians were taken prisoner.

== Aftermath ==
The Sand War laid the foundations for a lasting and often intensely-hostile rivalry between Morocco and Algeria, exacerbated by the differences in political outlook between the conservative Moroccan monarchy and the revolutionary Arab socialist Algerian military government. In January 1969, Algerian President Houari Boumédiène made a state visit to Morocco and signed a treaty of friendship with Hassan's government in Ifrane. The following year the two leaders set up a commission to demarcate the border and examine prospects for joint efforts to mine iron ore in the disputed region. Morocco finally abandoned all claims to Algerian territory in 1972 with the Accord of Ifrane, though Morocco refused to ratify the agreement until 1989.

The governments of both Morocco and Algeria used the war to describe opposition movements as unpatriotic. The Moroccan UNFP and the Algerian-Berber FFS of Aït Ahmed both suffered as a result. In the case of UNFP, its leader, Mehdi Ben Barka, sided with Algeria, and was sentenced to death in absentia as a result. In Algeria, the armed rebellion of the FFS in Kabylie fizzled out, as commanders defected to join the national forces against Morocco.

The rivalry between Morocco and Algeria exemplified in the Sand War also influenced Algeria's policy regarding the conflict in Western Sahara, with Algeria backing an independence-minded Sahrawi guerrilla organization, the Polisario Front, partly to curb Moroccan expansionism in the wake of the attempt to annex Tindouf.

== See also ==
- List of modern conflicts in North Africa
- Algeria–Morocco border
- Algeria–Morocco relations

== Bibliography ==
- Bidwell, Robin (1998). Dictionary Of Modern Arab History. South Glamorgan: Kegan Paul International. ISBN 978-1138967670.
- Gleijeses, Piero (2002). Conflicting Missions: Havana, Washington and Africa, 1959–1976. Chapel Hill, NC: University of North Carolina Press. ISBN 978-0-807-82647-8.
- Goldstein, Erik (1992). Wars and Peace Treaties: 1816 to 1991. Oxfordshire: Routledge Books. ISBN 978-0415078221.
- Farsoun, K.; Paul, J. (1976), "War in the Sahara: 1963", Middle East Research and Information Project (MERIP) Reports, 45 (45): 13–16, JSTOR 3011767. Link requires subscription to Jstor.
- Heggoy, A.A. (1970), "Colonial origins of the Algerian-Moroccan border conflict of October 1963", African Studies Review, 13 (1): 17–22, doi:10.2307/523680, JSTOR 523680, S2CID 145424137. Link requires subscription to Jstor.
- Ottaway, David (1970), Algeria: The Politics of a Socialist Revolution, Berkeley, California: University of California Press, ISBN 9780520016552
- Reyner, A.S. (1963), "Morocco's international boundaries: a factual background", Journal of Modern African Studies, 1 (3): 313–326, doi:10.1017/s0022278x00001725, JSTOR 158912, S2CID 154868086. Link requires subscription to Jstor.
- Torres-García, Ana (2013), "US diplomacy and the North African 'War of the Sands' (1963)", The Journal of North African Studies, 18 (2): 324–48, doi:10.1080/13629387.2013.767041, S2CID 144944978
- Touval, S. (1967), "The Organization of African Unity and African borders", International Organization, 21 (1): 102–127, doi:10.1017/s0020818300013151, JSTOR 2705705, S2CID 154805054. Link requires subscription to Jstor.
- Stephen O. Hughes, Morocco under King Hassan, Garnet & Ithaca Press, 2001, ISBN 0-8637-2285-7
- Zunes, Stephen (1995). "Algeria, The Maghreb Union, and the Western Sahara Stalemate." Arab Studies Quarterly, 17 (3): 23–36. JSTOR 41858127.
