= Battle of El-Moungar =

1903 French defeat of Moroccan Berbers

Coordinates: 35.433333°N 4.05°E

- Part of South-Oranese Campaign
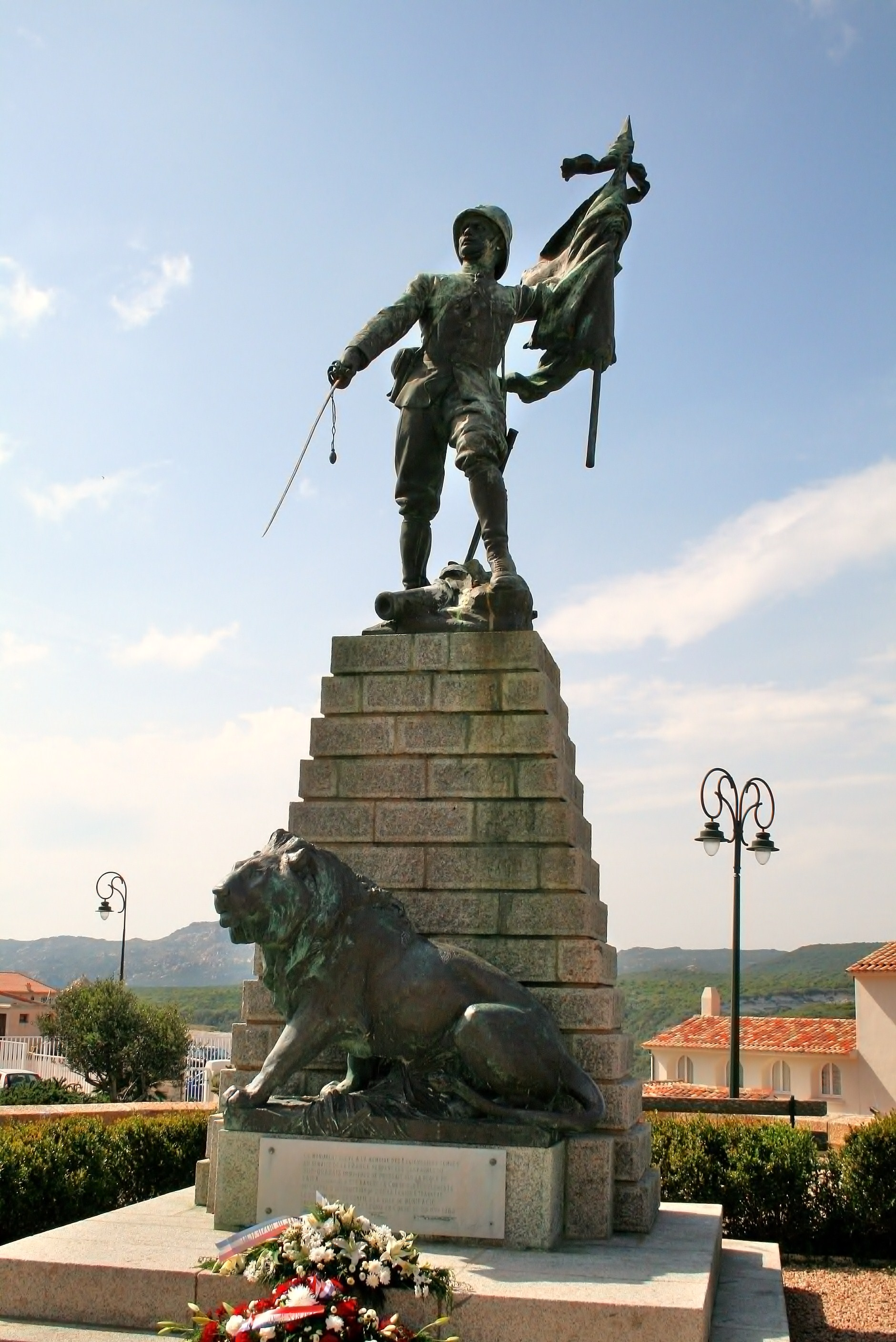
- Monument to the French Foreign Légionnaires who died during the Sud-Oranais Campaign
Date	2 September 1903
Location	South of Oran, Algerian - Moroccan border
Result	French victory

Belligerents
France	Berbers Ait atta - Ait yafelman

Commanders and leaders
Captain Vauchez †, then Lieutenant Selchauhansen †, then Maréchal-des-logis Damien †, then Sergent-fourrier Tisserand (WIA), then Corporal Detz	Unknown

Strength
148 Légionnaires; 2 Mokhaznis; 20 Spahis	3,000 horsemen

Casualties and losses
38 dead, 49 wounded	Unknown

The Battle of El-Moungar was fought during the South-Oranese Campaign between a contingent of the French Army of Africa, mainly from the French Foreign Legion, and Moroccan tribesmen.

== Background ==
In the early twentieth century, French troops in Algeria faced numerous incidents, attacks and looting by uncontrolled armed groups in the newly controlled areas to the south of Oran. Under the command of General Lyautey, the French army's mission was to protect these areas newly occupied in the west of Algeria, near the poorly defined Moroccan boundaries. This loose boundary, between French Algeria and the Sultanate of Morocco, promoted incursions and attacks by Moroccan tribesmen.

On 17 August 1903, the first battle of the South-Oranese campaign took place in Taghit when a contingent of the French Foreign Legion was attacked by more than 1,000 well-equipped Berbers. For three days, the legionnaires repelled repeated attacks of an enemy more than 10 times their number, and inflicted heavy losses on the attackers, forcing them finally into retreat.

== The battle ==
A few days after the Battle of Taghit, 148 legionnaires of the 22nd mounted company, from the 2e REI, commanded by Captain Vauchez and Lieutenant Selchauhansen, 20 Spahis, and two Mokhaznis were escorting a supply convoy, when they were ambushed at 9:30 am on 2 September by 3,000 Moroccan tribesmen. The half-company had halted to eat, no sentries had been posted, and only a few cavalry pickets had been placed.

The first volleys wounded or killed half of the detachment. Both officers and most of the non-commissioned officers were killed in the first stage of the fight. At 10:30 am, Quartermaster Sergeant (sergent-fourrier) Tisserand, who commanded the survivors, sent two spahi cavalrymen to Taghit for reinforcements. They immediately left.

About forty survivors of the French force gathered on a nearby hill and under a scorching sun, on hot sand and without water, fought off the enemy for more than eight hours. Near the end of the battle, Tisserand, wounded, gave over command to Corporal Detz; the highest-ranked man still able. At 5 pm, they were relieved by Captain de Sulbielle, who rode from Taghit with his Spahis. At the sight of the approaching French cavalry, the Moroccans retreated in small groups.

== Aftermath ==
Total French losses were 38 dead and 46 wounded. A presidential decree granted to all survivors of the battle the Colonial Medal, and Tisserand was promoted to lieutenant. Despite the courage shown by the legionnaires, the heavy losses suffered by the half-company and indications that inadequate precautions had led to the initial success of the ambush caused serious concern. The commander of the Ain Sefra military region was replaced and Brigadier General Hubert Lyautey was appointed in his place.

== Bibliography ==
Jean-Paul Mahuault, L'épopée marocaine de la Légion étrangère, 1903-1934, ou, Trente années au Maroc, L'Harmattan, 2005.
