= Battle of Taghit =

1903 siege of a fort in Béchar, Algeria

Coordinates: 35.433333°N 4.05°E

- Part of South-Oranese Campaign
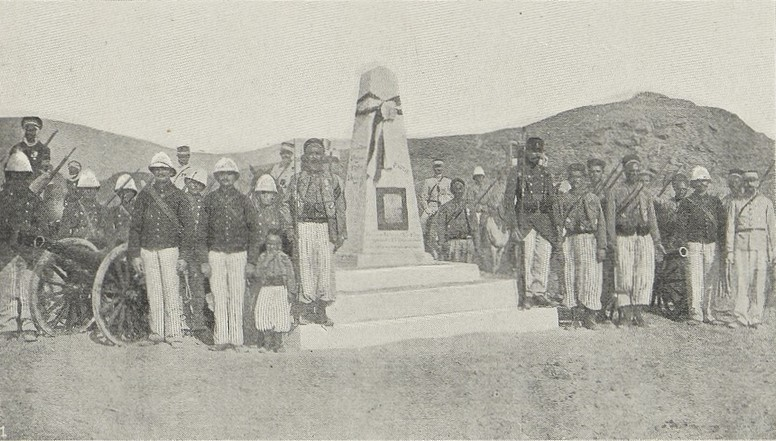
- French soldiers gathered at the monument of the battle (L'Illustration magazine, 1904)
Date	17–20 August 1903
Location	Taghit, Algerian-Moroccan border
Result	French victory

Belligerents
France	Harka tribal coalition: Various Moroccan volunteers

Commanders and leaders
Captain de Susbielle	Mouley Mustapha; Ba Sidi

Strength
470	9,000: 4,000 warriors; 5,000 non-combattants

Casualties and losses
9 dead, 21 wounded	Close to 200

The Battle of Taghit was the siege of a fort held by a contingent of the French Army of Africa against Moroccan tribesmen during the South-Oranese Campaign.

== Background ==
In the 1890s, the French administration and military called for the annexation of the Touat, the Gourara and the Tidikelt, a complex that had been controlled by tribes under the domination the Moroccan Empire for many centuries prior to the arrival of the French in Algeria.

An armed conflict opposed French 19th Corps Oran and Algiers divisions to the Aït Khabbash, a fraction of the Moroccan Aït Ounbgui khams of the Aït Atta confederation. The conflict ended with the annexation of the Touat-Gourara-Tidikelt complex by France in 1901.

In the aftermath, France faced numerous incidents, attacks and looting by uncontrolled armed groups in the newly controlled areas to the south of Oran. Under the command of General Lyautey, the French army's mission was to protect these areas newly occupied in the west of Algeria, near the poorly defined Moroccan boundaries. This loose boundary, between French Algeria and the Sultanate of Morocco, promoted incursions and attacks by tribesmen.

France also sought to expand their territories westwards towards Bechar, and these attacks gave them a casus belli to do so. In turn several tribes around the region decided to form a pan-tribal alliance called "Harka", led by a man called Ba Sidi, and a member of the Alaouite dynasty called Mouley Mustapha, who sought to gain prestige out of this attack.

== The battle ==
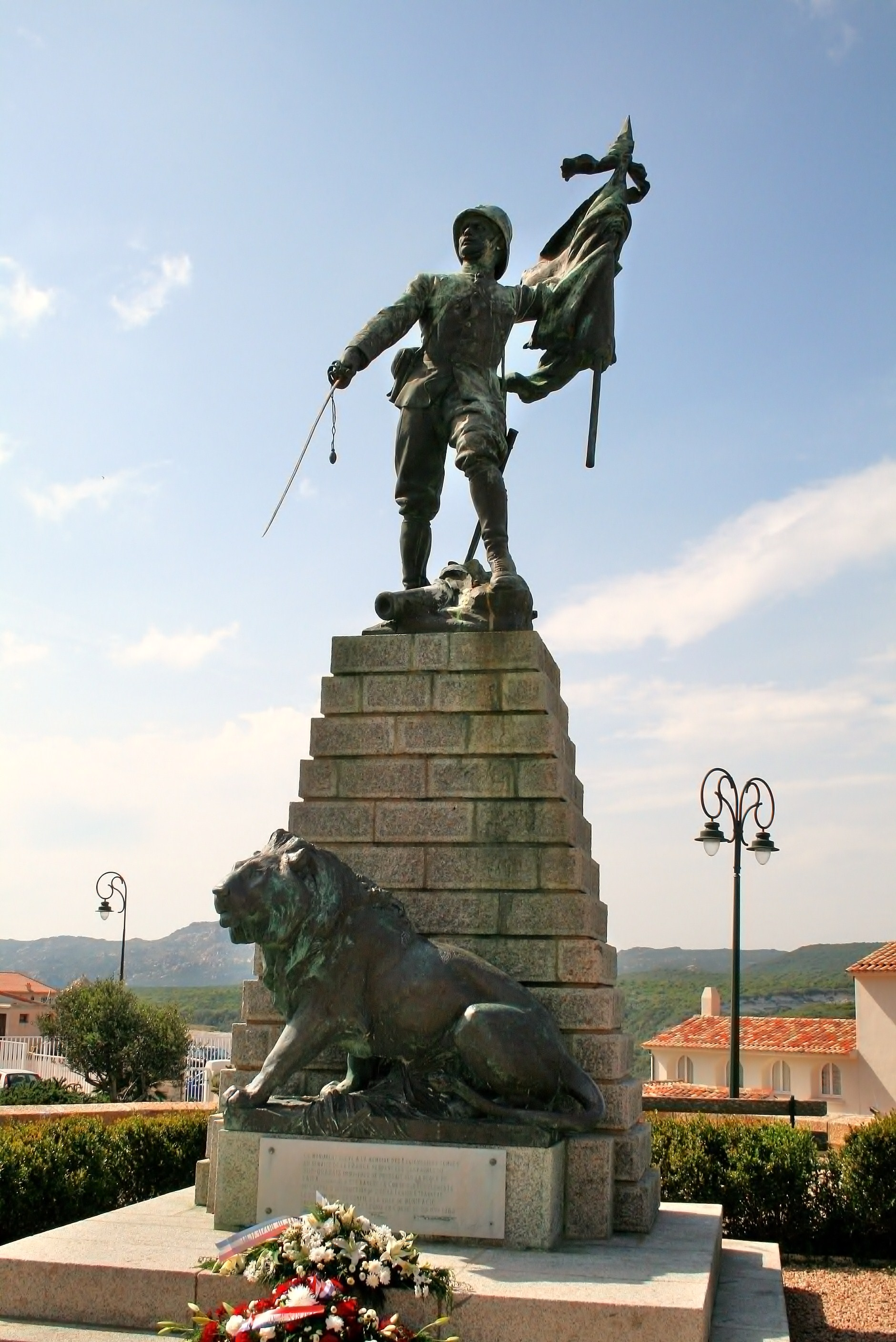
Monument to the French Foreign Légionnaires who died during the South-Oranese campaign

The tribal coalition, armed mainly with breech-loading and muzzleloading guns, composed of 4,000 warriors, and 5,000 camp followers arrived at Taghit on 17 August. For four days they besieged the outpost and its French troop, but the fierce defense of the garrison and the several sorties ordered by Captain de Susbielle weakened the tribesmen. Finally on 20 August reinforcements arrived, which, along with other factors, forced the tribal coalition to disperse and flee into the desert.

=== French units involved ===
- 7th Company of the 2nd Regiment of Algerian Tirailleurs led by Captain Guibert
- A Platoon of the Battalions of Light Infantry of Africa led by Captain Mariande
- A Platoon of the 22nd Mounted Company of the 2nd Foreign Infantry Regiment led by Lieutenant Pointurier
- 60 Horsemen of the makhzen of Taghit led by Lieutenant de Ganay
- 60 Horsemen of the makhzen of Béni-Abbés led by Lieutenant de Lachaux

== Aftermath ==
A few days after the battle of Taghit, 148 legionnaires of the 22nd mounted company, from the 2e REI, commanded by Captain Vauchez and Lieutenant Selchauhansen, 20 Spahis and 2 Mokhaznis, forming part of escorting a supply convoy, were ambushed, on September 2, by 3,000 Moroccans tribesmen, at El-Moungar.

== See also ==
- Battle of El-Moungar

== Bibliography ==
- Mahuault, Jean-Paul (2005). L'épopée marocaine de la Légion étrangère, 1903-1934, ou, Trente années au Maroc. L'Harmattan. ISBN 9782747580571.
