= Zaouia Foukania =

- Village
- Location within Algeria
- Coordinates: 30°56′21″N 2°3′3″W
- Country: Algeria
- Province: Béchar Province
- District: Taghit District
- Commune: Taghit
- Elevation: 622 m (2,041 ft)
- Time zone: UTC+1 (CET)

Zaouia Foukania is a village and zaouia in the commune of Taghit, in Taghit District, Béchar Province, Algeria. It is located 3 kilometres (1.9 mi) northwest of Taghit.
