= Berrabi Bakhti =

- Village
- Location within Algeria
- Coordinates: 30°50′57″N 1°59′58″W
- Country: Algeria
- Province: Béchar Province
- District: Taghit District
- Commune: Taghit
- Elevation: 592 m (1,942 ft)
- Time zone: UTC+1 (CET)

Berrabi Bakhti is a village in the commune of Taghit, in Taghit District, Béchar Province, Algeria. The village is located on the eastern side of the Oued Zouzfana 8 kilometres (5.0 mi) south of Taghit, on the western edge of the Grand Erg Occidental.
