= Taghit =

Taghit ﺗﺎﻏﻴﺖ
- Commune and town
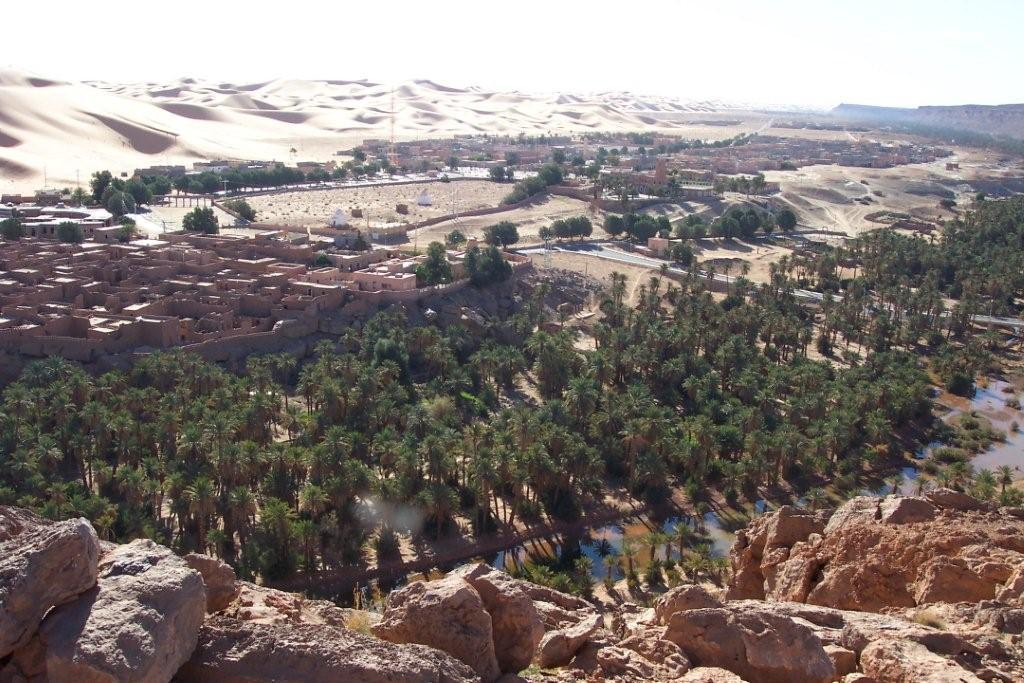

- Location of Taghit commune within Béchar Province

- Location of Taghit within Algeria
- Coordinates: 30°55′N 2°2′W
- Country: Algeria
- Province: Béchar Province
- District: Taghit District (coextensive)

Area
  - Total: 8,080 km^{2} (3,120 sq mi)
- Elevation: 623 m (2,044 ft)

Population (2008)
  - Total: 6,317
  - Density: 0.782/km^{2} (2.02/sq mi)
- Time zone: UTC+1 (CET)

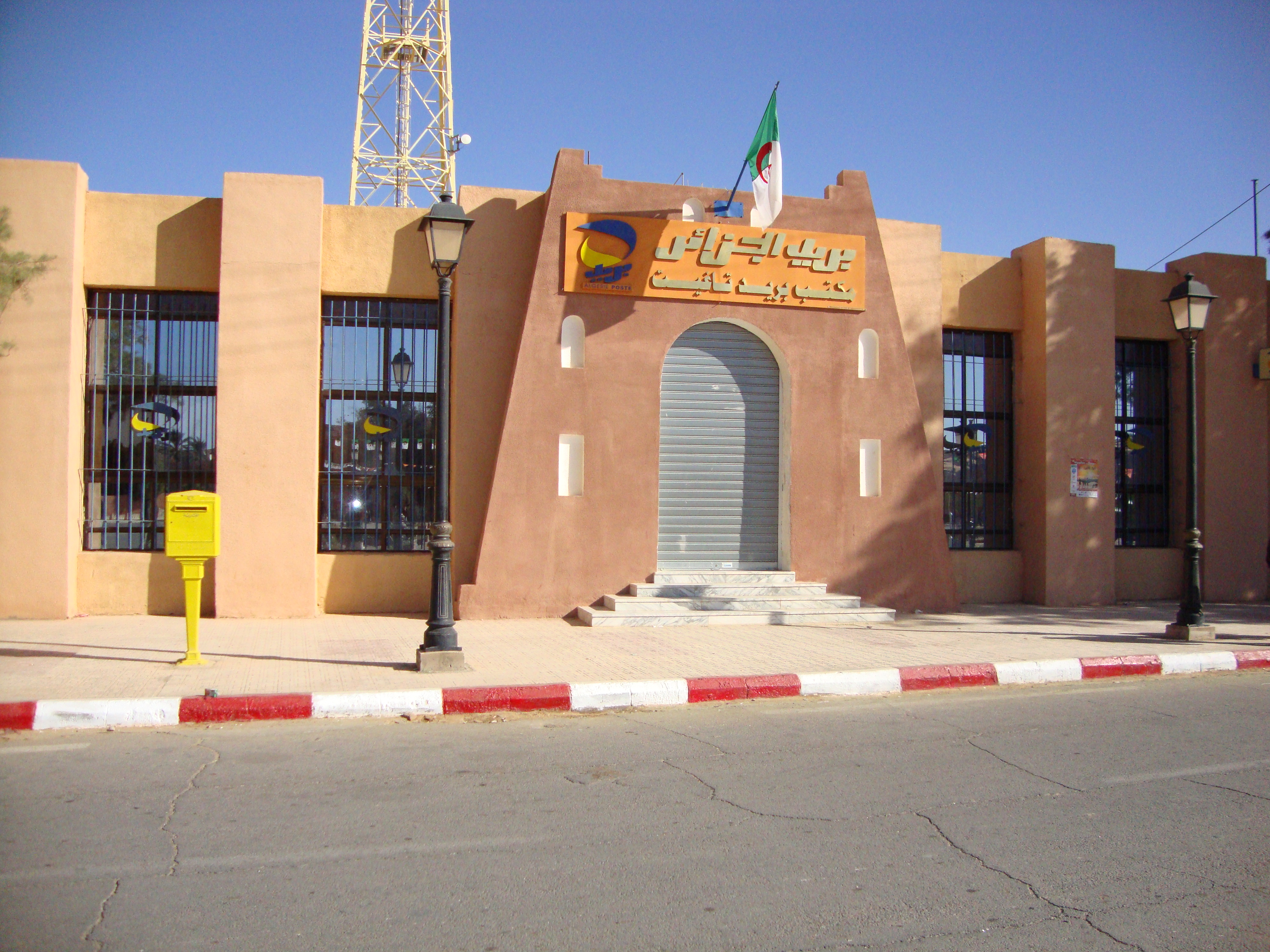
Post office of Taghit

Taghit (Arabic: ﺗﺎﻏﻴﺖ) is a town and commune in Taghit District, Béchar Province, in western Algeria. The town is an oasis watered by the underground Oued Zousfana, which runs along beside the dunes of the Grand Erg Occidental. According to the 2008 census its population is 6,317, up from 6,047 in 1998, with an annual growth rate of 0.4%. The commune covers an area of 8,080 square kilometres (3,120 sq mi).

== History ==
The town was the site of the Battle of Taghit in 1903, in which 4000 Zayanes Berbers besieged the French in the town, whom they outnumbered by 10 to 1. The attackers were later forced to retreat.

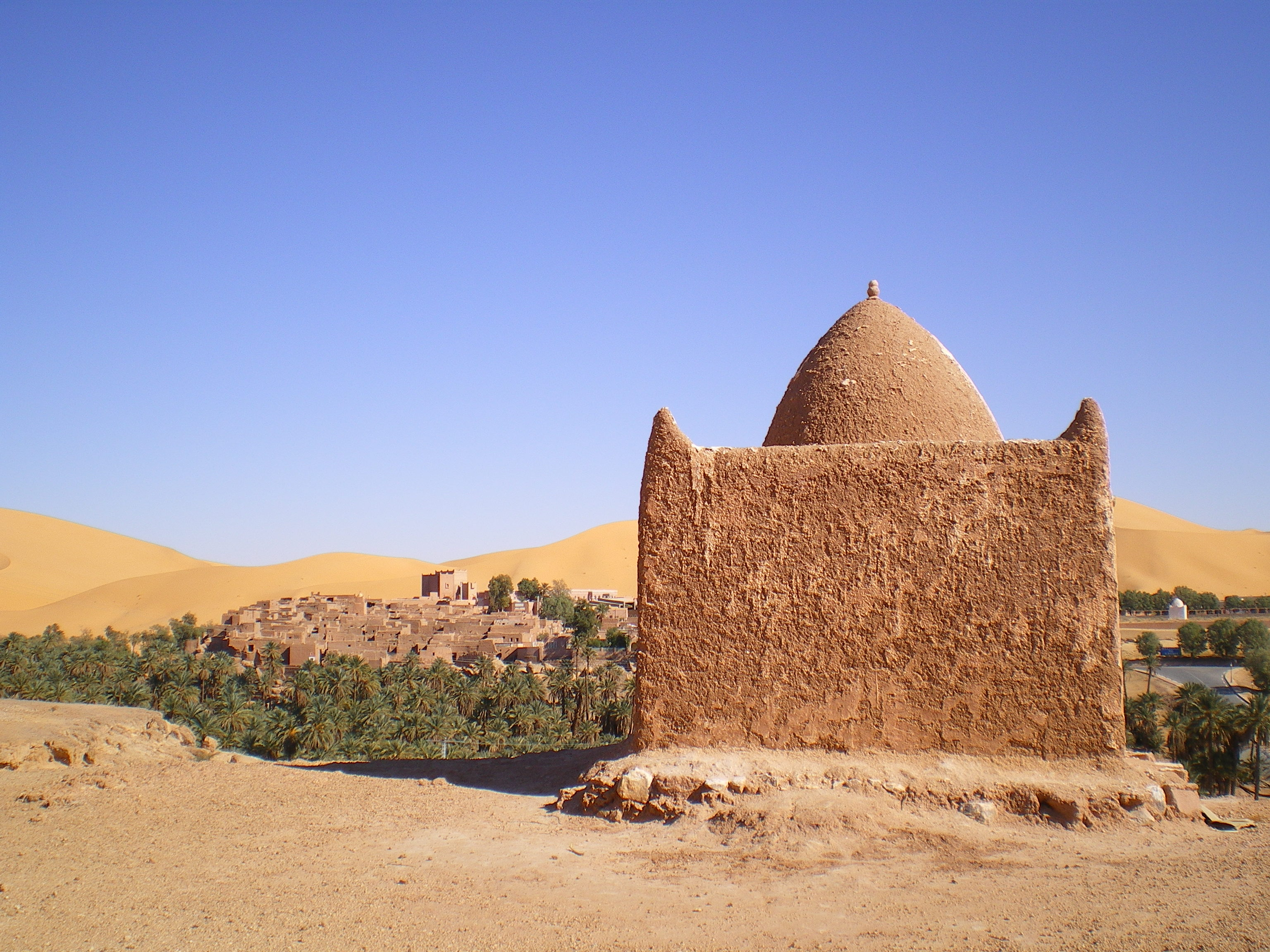
Qibba Taghit Oasis

== Geography ==
Taghit lies on the left (eastern) bank of the Oued Zouzfana. The Grand Erg Occidental, a large area of continuous sand dunes, lies to the east, while the rocky Djebel Baroun lies to the west across the river.

== Climate ==
Taghit has a hot desert climate (Köppen climate classification BWh), with extremely hot summers and cool winters, and very little precipitation throughout the year.

Climate data for Taghit
Month	Jan	Feb	Mar	Apr	May	Jun	Jul	Aug	Sep	Oct	Nov	Dec	Year
Mean daily maximum °C (°F)	17.0 (62.6)	20.4 (68.7)	24.0 (75.2)	28.6 (83.5)	33.0 (91.4)	38.1 (100.6)	42.3 (108.1)	40.8 (105.4)	35.8 (96.4)	28.7 (83.7)	22.0 (71.6)	17.9 (64.2)	29.1 (84.3)
Daily mean °C (°F)	9.9 (49.8)	12.9 (55.2)	16.7 (62.1)	21.0 (69.8)	25.4 (77.7)	30.5 (86.9)	34.5 (94.1)	33.3 (91.9)	28.7 (83.7)	21.9 (71.4)	15.5 (59.9)	11.0 (51.8)	21.8 (71.2)
Mean daily minimum °C (°F)	2.8 (37.0)	5.4 (41.7)	9.4 (48.9)	13.5 (56.3)	17.9 (64.2)	23.0 (73.4)	26.7 (80.1)	25.9 (78.6)	21.6 (70.9)	15.1 (59.2)	9.0 (48.2)	4.1 (39.4)	14.5 (58.2)
Average precipitation mm (inches)	11 (0.4)	8 (0.3)	11 (0.4)	7 (0.3)	4 (0.2)	3 (0.1)	1 (0.0)	3 (0.1)	6 (0.2)	11 (0.4)	12 (0.5)	11 (0.4)	88 (3.3)
Source: climate-data.org

== Economy ==
Agriculture is an important industry in Taghit. The commune has a total of 2,280 hectares (5,600 acres) of arable land, of which 1,432 hectares (3,540 acres) is irrigated. There are a total of 137,450 date palms planted in the commune. As of 2009 there were 3,330 sheep, 2,995 goats, 2,481 camels, and 62 cattle. There were also 24,000 chickens in 2 buildings.

Tourism is also significant in Taghit due to many Neolithic rock engravings in the area. Other attractions include sand dunes, palm groves, the old ksar and the zawiya. Taghit has several hotels and guesthouses serving visitors.

== Infrastructure and housing ==
90% of Taghits's population are connected to drinking water, 96% are connected to the sewerage system, and 93% (including 1,485 buildings) have access to electricity. There is one fuel service station in the town.

Taghit has a total of 1,551 houses, of which 913 are occupied, giving an occupation rate of 6.9 inhabitants per occupied building.

== Transportation ==
There are three main roads out of Taghit: one leads northwest to the N6 highway (Bechar-Adrar section) just south of Bechar, another leads southwest through Igli to the N6 further south, and the third leads northeast, also to the N6 (Bechar-Mecheria section) northeast of Bechar, near Figuig. A number of small localities lie along the Oued Zouzfana to the south; these are connected by a local road.

Taghit is 95 kilometres (59 mi) from the provincial capital, Béchar.

There is a total length of 146 kilometres (91 mi) of roads in the commune.

== Education ==
There are 5 elementary schools, with 39 classrooms including 30 in use. There are a total of 1,310 school students.

5.9% of the population has a tertiary education, and another 18.4% has competed secondary education. The overall literacy rate is 81.4%, and is 86.6% among males and 76.7% among females.

== Health ==
Taghit has 4 room care facilities, and a private pharmacy, and a medical operating theatre. The nearest hospital (by road) is in Béchar.

== Religion ==
Taghit has six operational mosques, with another under construction.

== Localities ==
The commune is composed of five localities:

- Taghit
- Zaouia Fougania
- Berrabi Bakhti
- Zaouia Tahtania
- Brika
