= Rgabi Ait Hassou =

Rgabi Ait Hassou الرڭابي أيت حسو
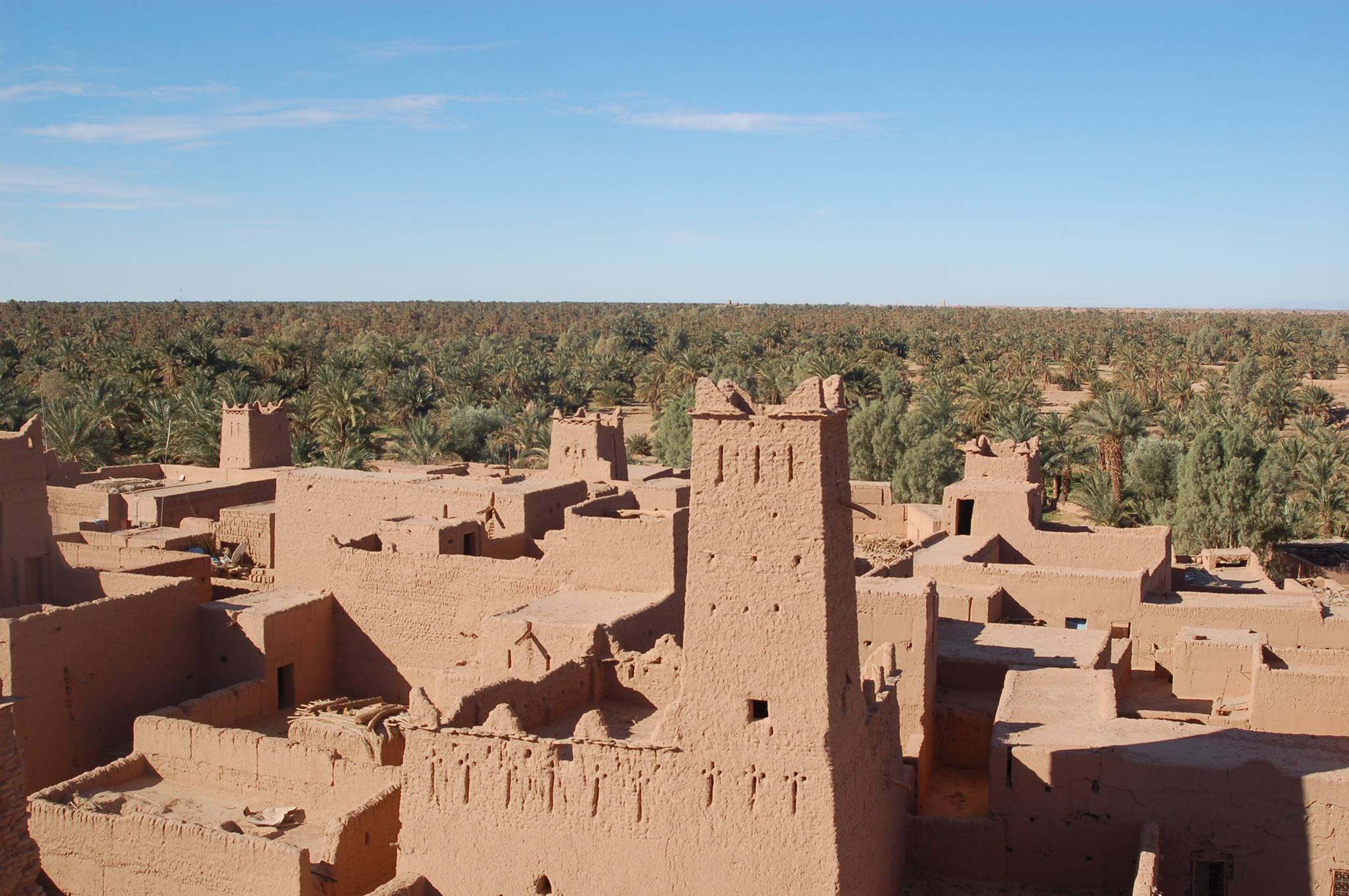

- Location in Morocco
- Coordinates: 29°50′25″N 5°38′24″W
- Country: Morocco
- Region: Drâa-Tafilalet
- Province: Zagora
- Commune: Mahamid

Population (2004)
  - Total: 600
- Time zone: UTC+0 (GMT)
- postal code: 47402
- Website: https://www.rgabi.com/

Rgabi Ait Hassou is a small town in southern Morocco's Sahara Desert, about 450 km south of Marrakesh, inhabited by the Berber people who speak Tamazight.

== Gallery ==
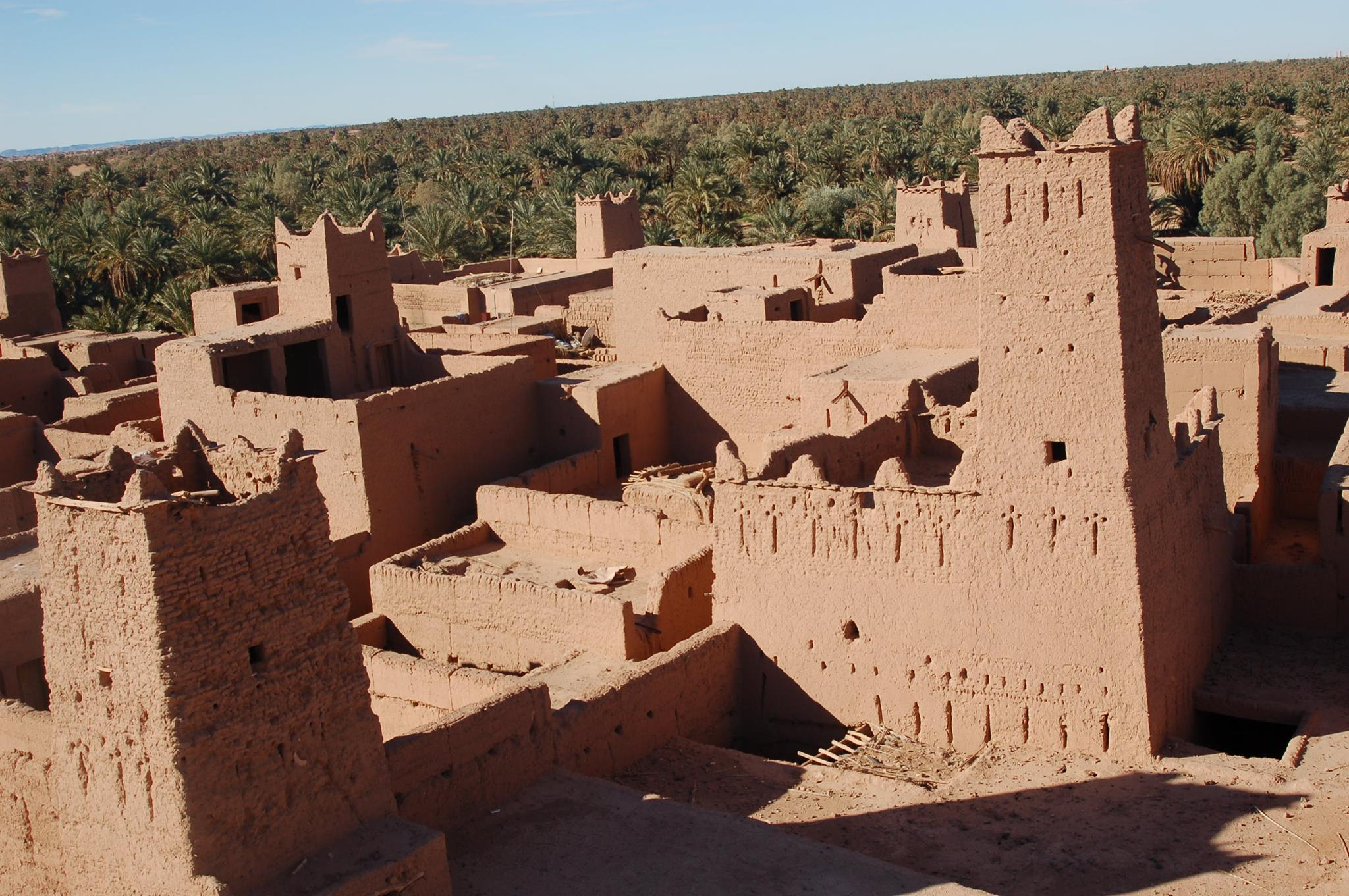

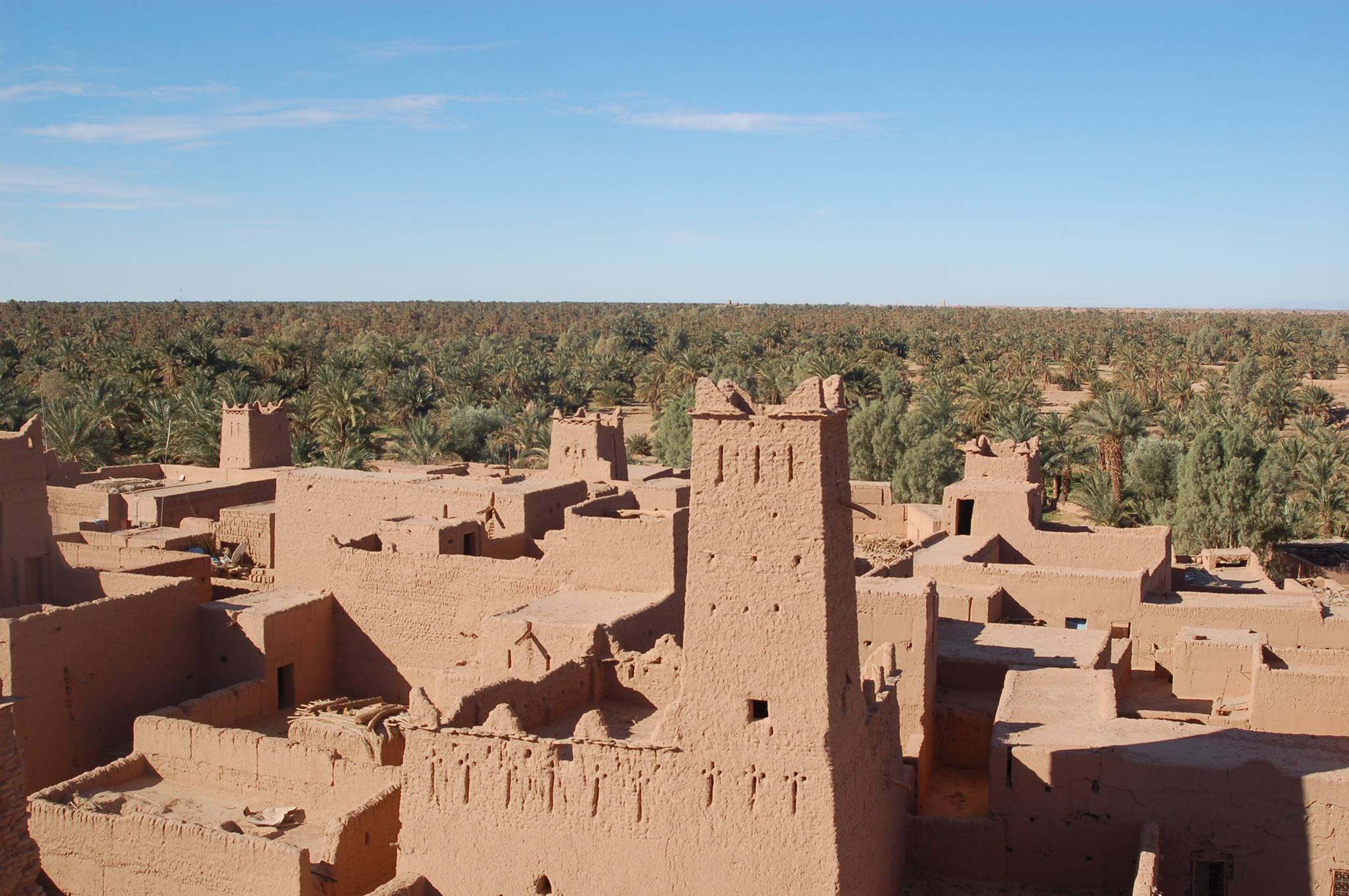

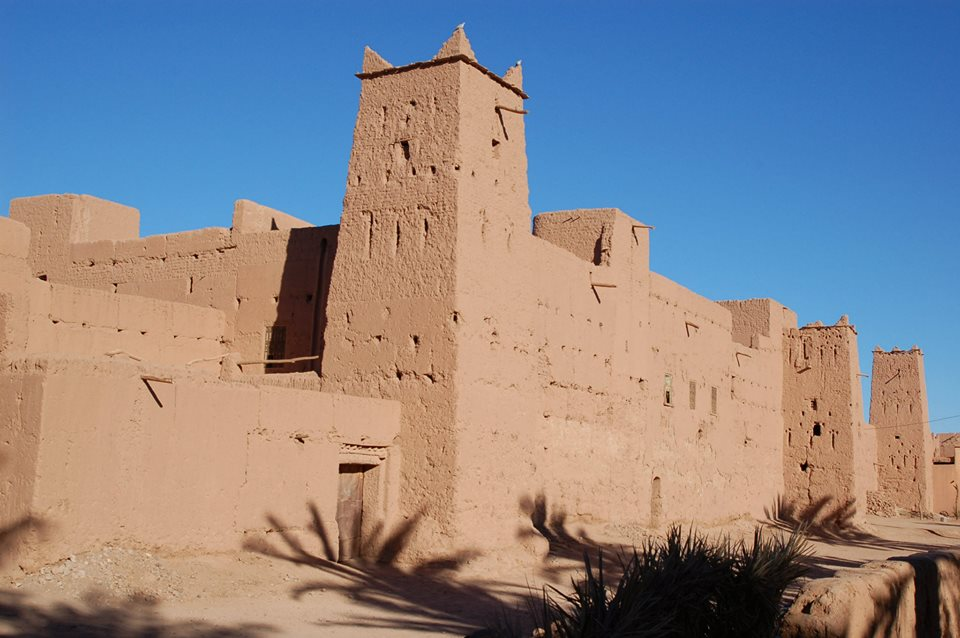

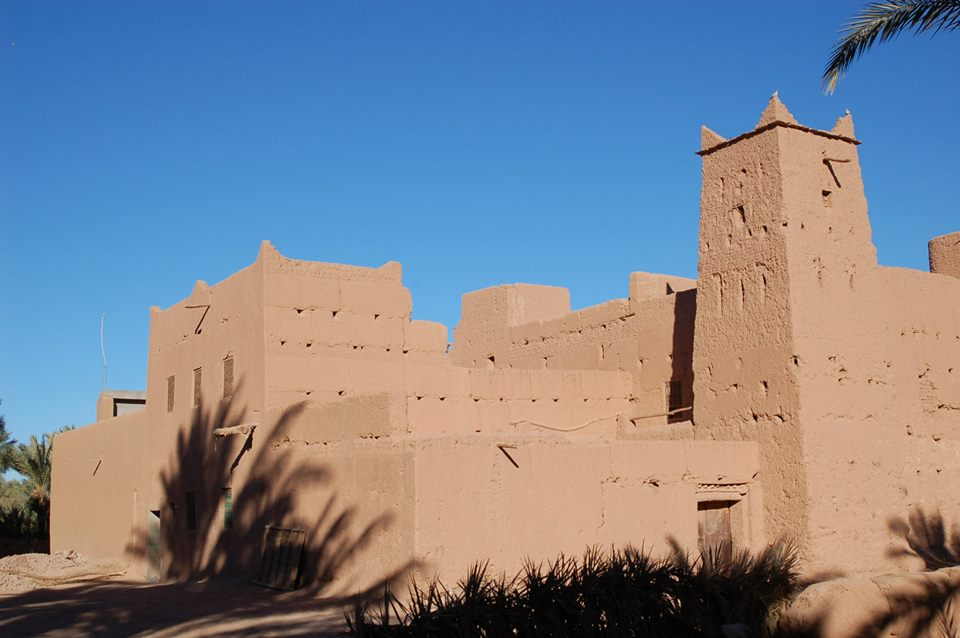

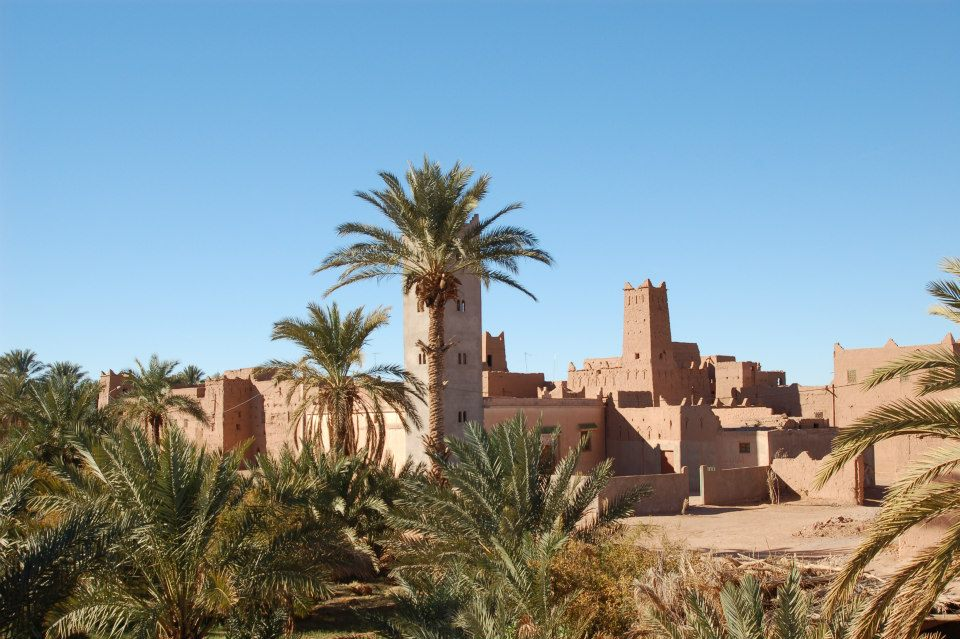

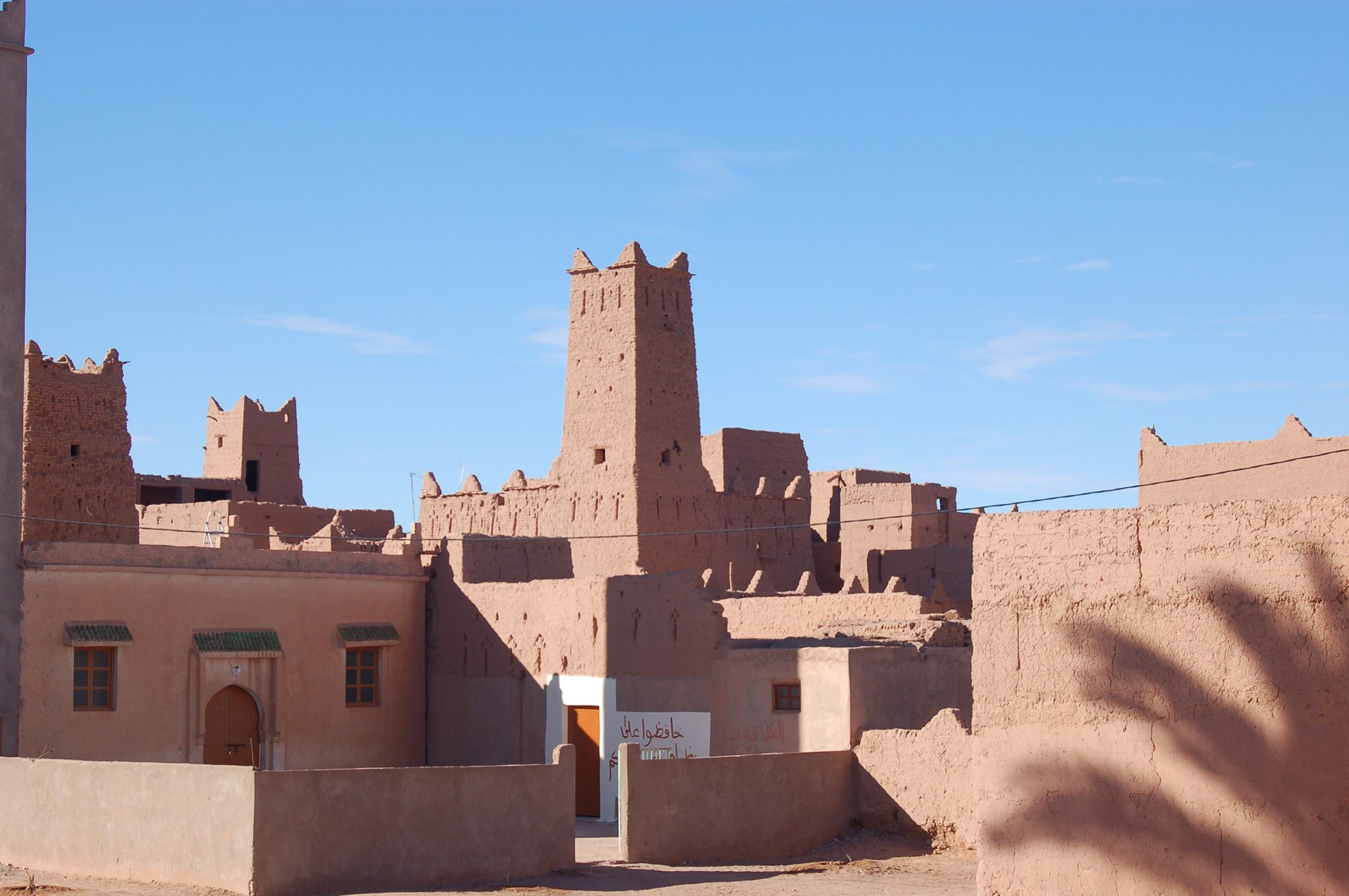

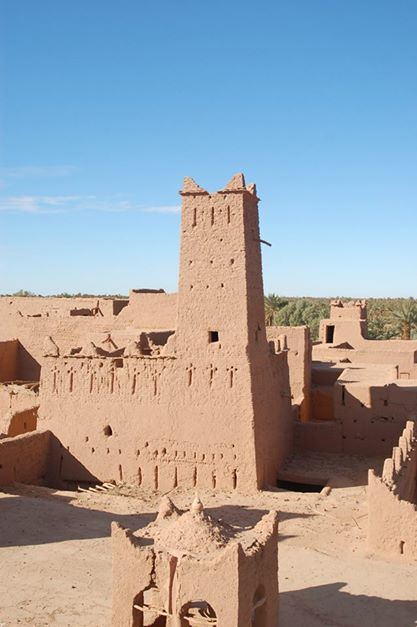

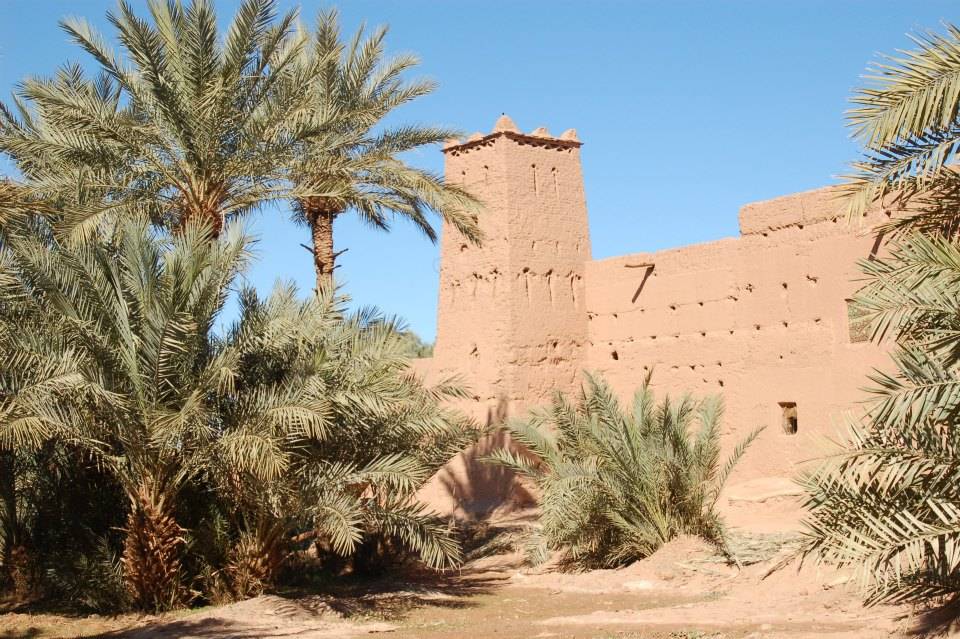

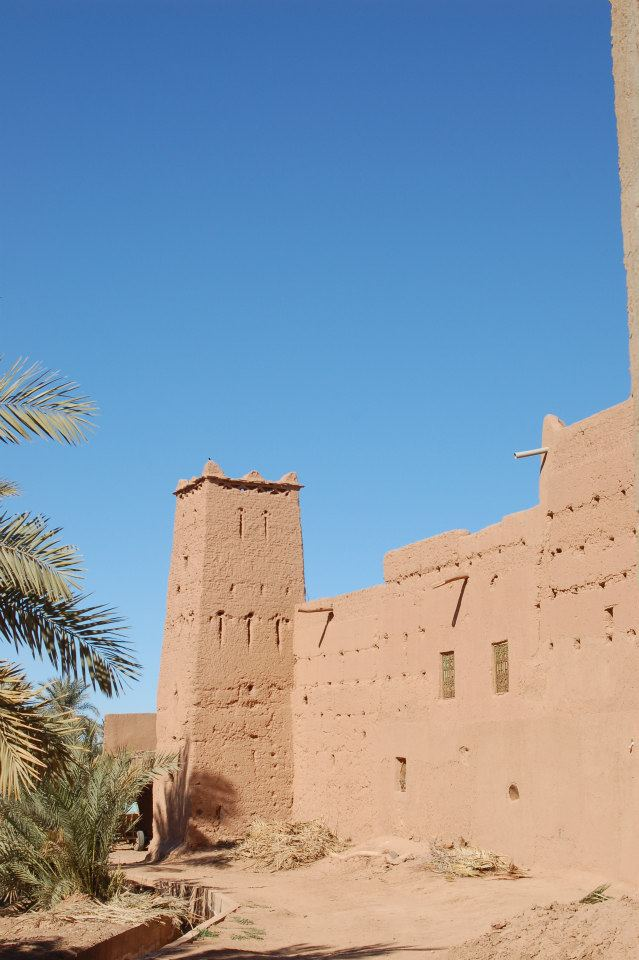

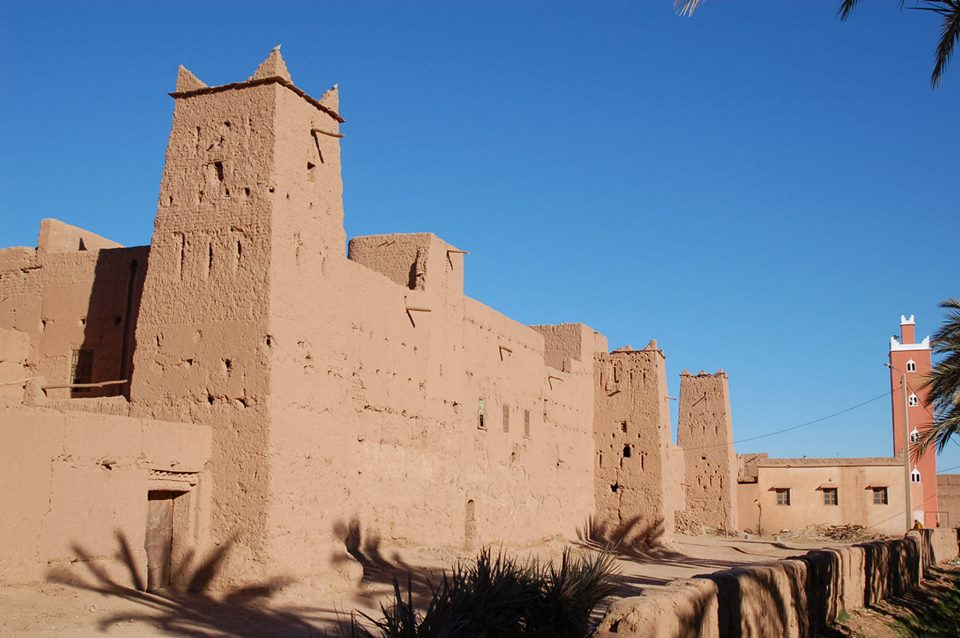

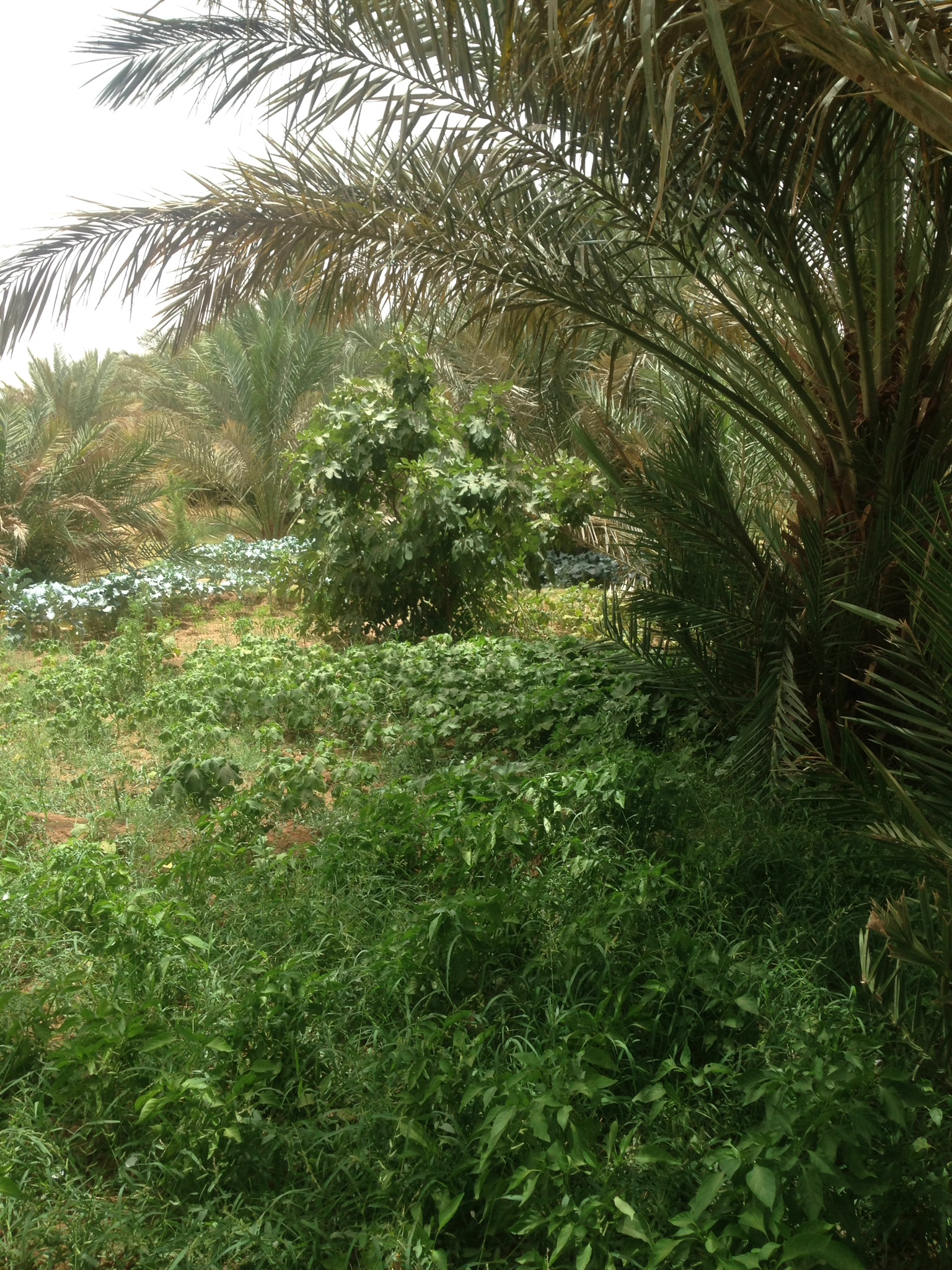

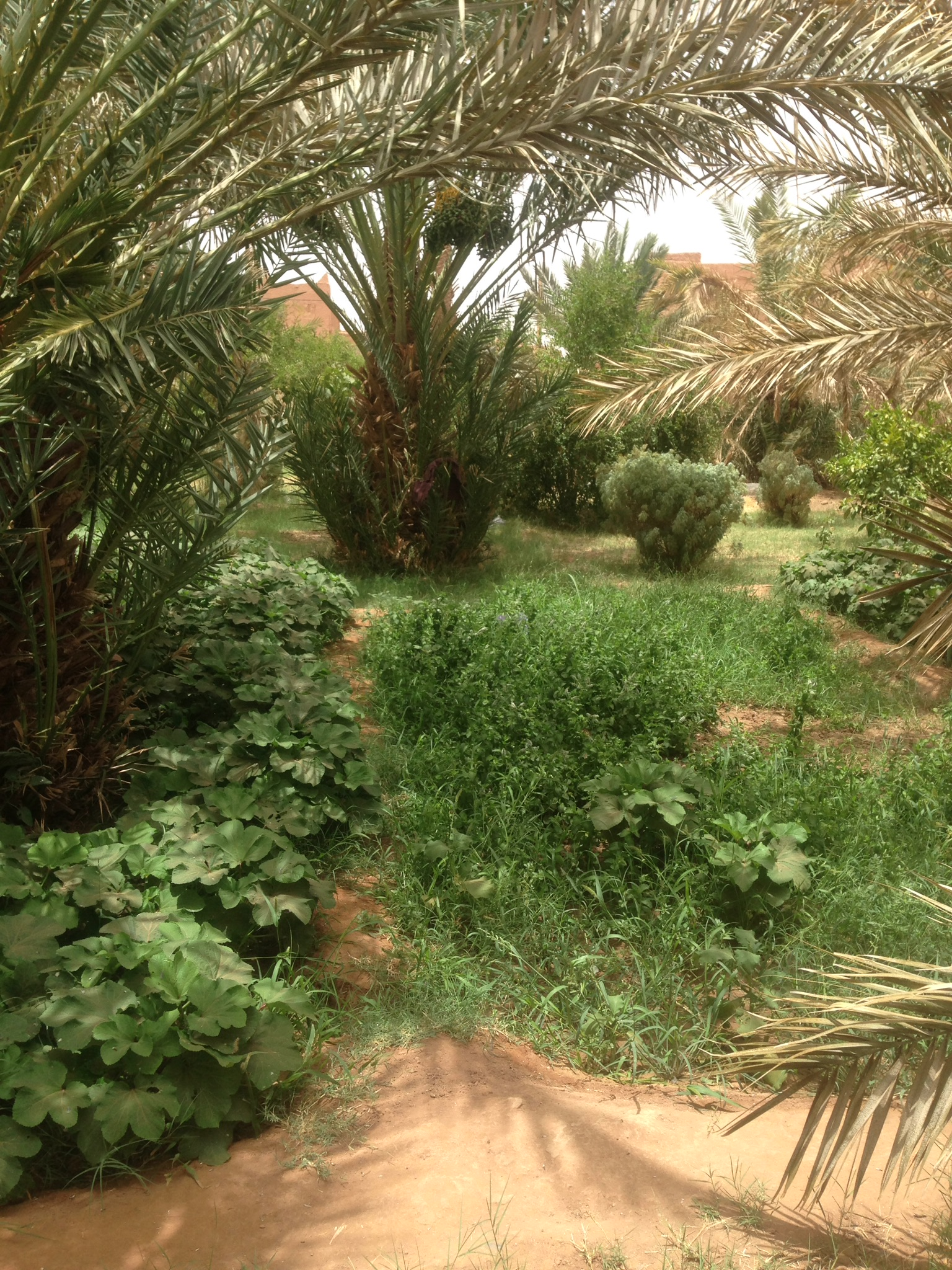

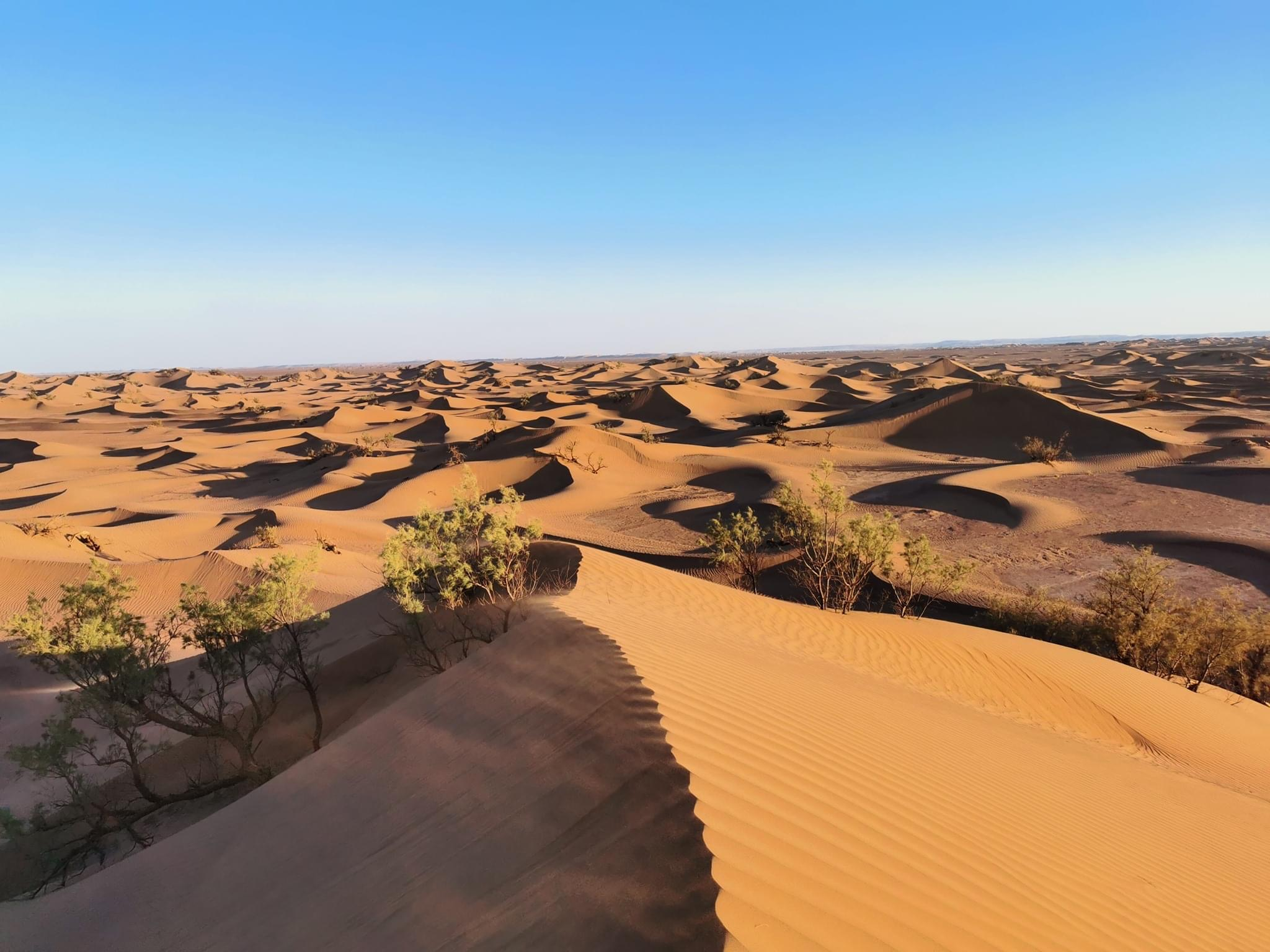

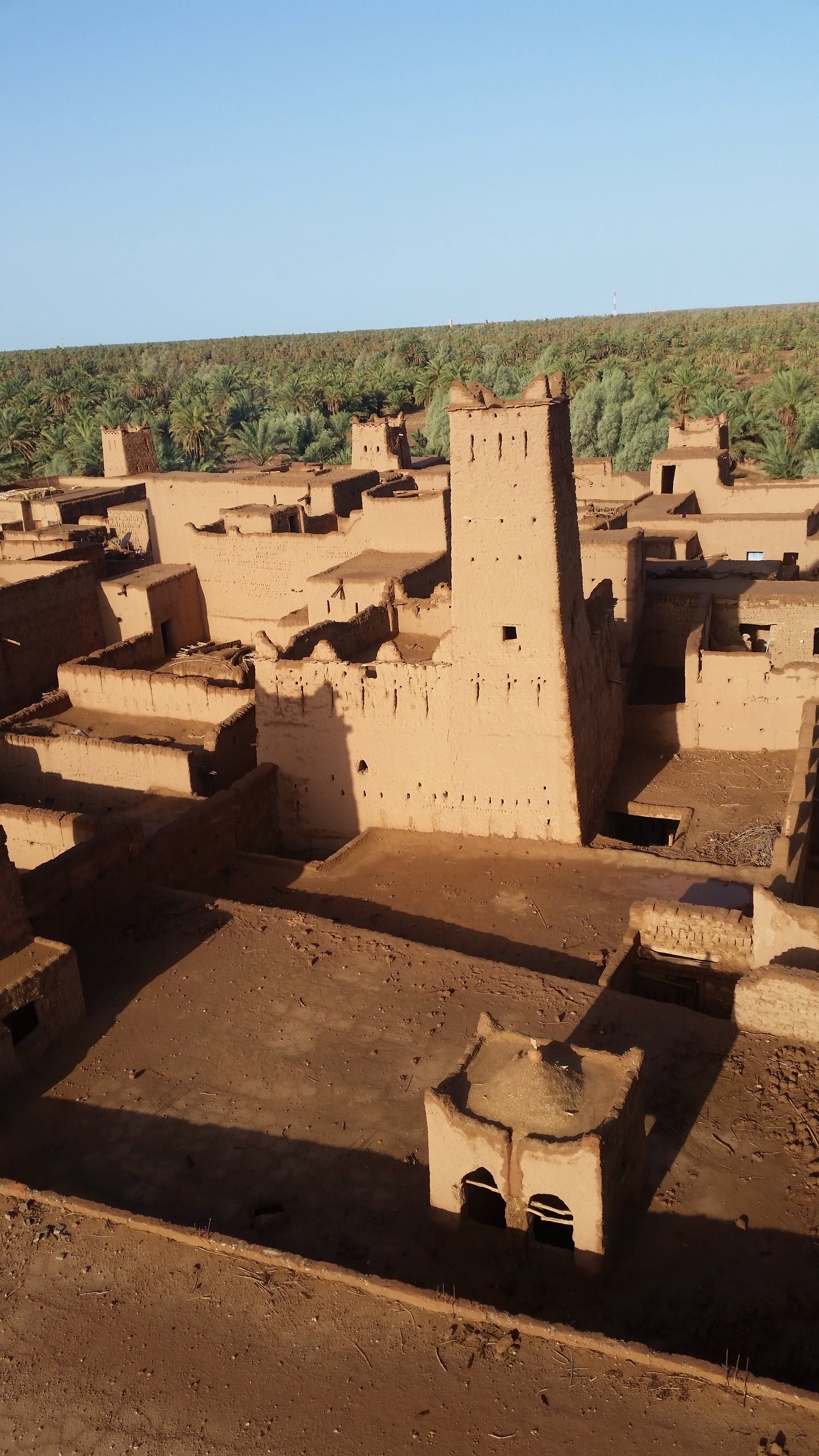
