= Sultanate of Morocco =

Sultanate of Morocco may refer to:

- Alawi Sultanate, the sultanate period of Morocco under the current reigning dynasty
- List of rulers of Morocco, including the sultans from various dynasties
- History of Morocco, the history of Morocco's sultanates
