= Algeria–Western Sahara border =

International border

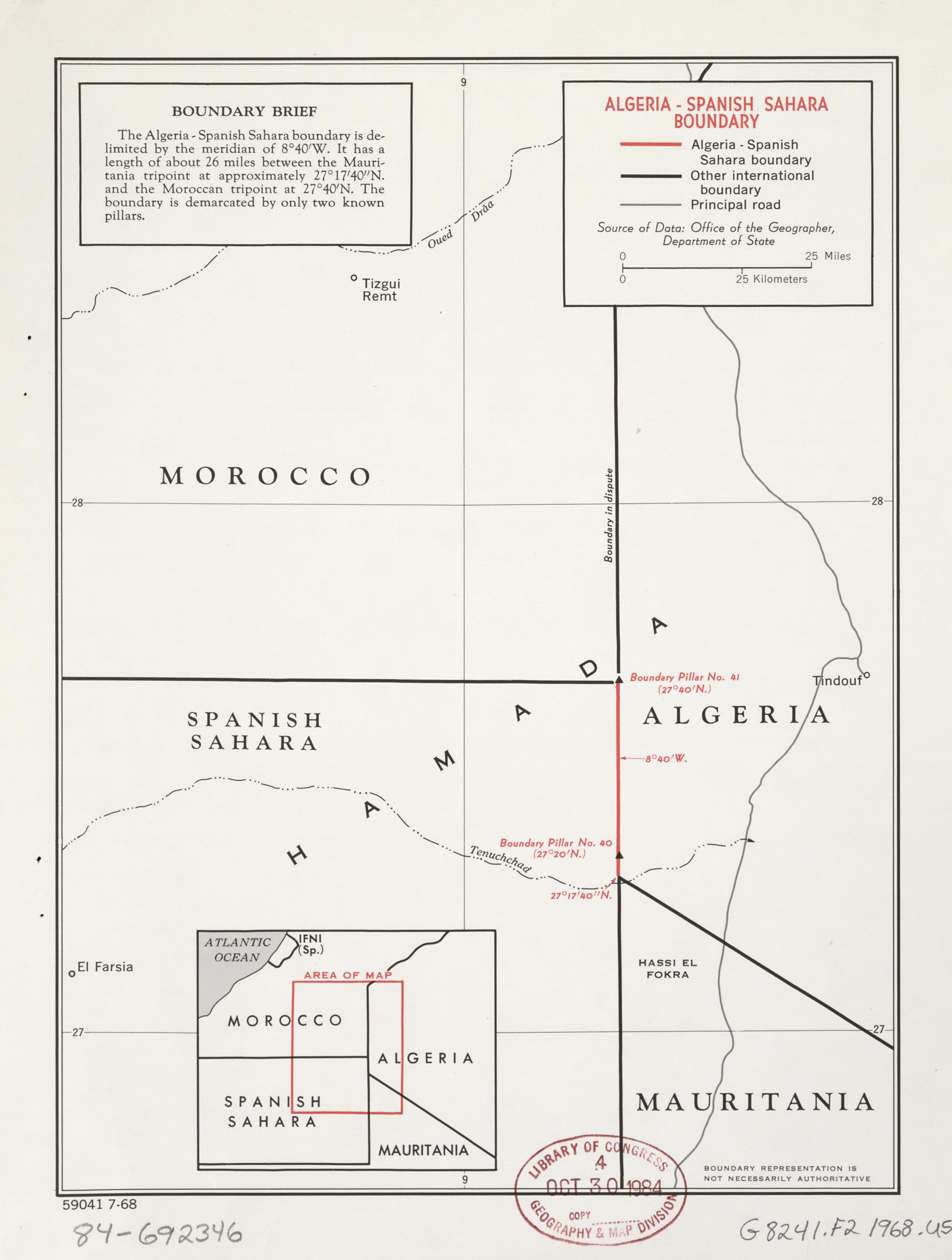
Map of the Algeria-Western Sahara border

The Algeria–Western Sahara border is 41 kilometres (25 mi) in length and runs from the tripoint with Morocco in the north to the tripoint with Mauritania in the south.

== Description ==
The border consists of a relatively short north–south straight line running through the Sahara desert connecting the Moroccan and Mauritanian tripoints.

== History ==
France occupied much of the northern coastal areas of Algeria in the period 1830–47, which had hitherto been subject to the nominal control of the Ottoman Empire. The border emerged during the 'Scramble for Africa', a period of intense competition between European powers in the later 19th century for territory and influence in Africa. The process culminated in the Berlin Conference of 1884, in which the European nations concerned agreed upon their respective territorial claims and the rules of engagement going forward. As a result of this process, Spain announced its intention to declare a protectorate over the north-west African coast between Cape Bojador and Ras Nouadhibou (Cape Blanco/Cap Blanc), which was formally created as the Rio de Oro colony the following year.

On 27 June 1900 France and Spain signed a treaty which created a border between Rio de Oro and French West Africa starting at Ras Nouadhibou and terminating at the junction of the 12th meridian west and the 26th parallel north (i.e. the bulk of the modern Mauritania–Western Sahara border). This boundary was then extended by a treaty of 3 October 1904 north up to what is now the tripoint with Algeria and then west along the parallel of 27°40'N, this latter line forming the modern Morocco–Western Sahara border; the new Spanish territory thus formed was named Saguia el-Hamra. Meanwhile, the Saharan areas of Algeria were annexed by France in 1902. A boundary between French West Africa and French Algeria (i.e. Algeria's modern borders with Mauritania, Mali and Niger) was agreed on 7 June 1905 by the Commandant of Upper Senegal and Niger and the Military Commander of the department de l'Oasis within French Algeria, thus formally creating a short Algerian frontier with Spanish Saguia el-Hamra. Another Franco-Spanish treaty was signed on 27 November 1912 which created a French protectorate over most of Morocco, whilst ceding parts of the country to Spain viz. the Mediterranean littoral (the 'Northern Zone', or more commonly Spanish Morocco), the exclave of Ifni and the Cape Juby/Tarfaya Strip (aka the 'Southern Zone'), the latter forming what is now the far south of Morocco proper, between the Draa River and the Saguia el-Hamra border at 27°40'N agreed upon in 1904. The entire French West Africa/French Algeria-Saguia el Hamara/Rio de Oro boundary was confirmed by treaty on 19 December 1956, with France and Spain then demarcating it on the ground in 1957 with several pillars.

From 1946 to 1958 Spanish Morocco, the Tarfaya Strip, Ifni, Rio de Oro and Saguia el Hamra were united as Spanish West Africa. Morocco gained independence from France in 1956 and, inspired by the idea of creating a 'Greater Morocco', claimed all of Spanish West Africa as Moroccan land. In 1958 Spain merged Rio de Oro and Saguia el-Hamara in 1958 as Spanish Sahara. Morocco turned its sights to Spanish Sahara, however Mauritania (independent since 1960) also contested the territory, claiming the former colony of Rio de Oro as part of 'Greater Mauritania'. Algeria had gained independence from France in 1962 following the Algerian War. Saharawi nationalists had meanwhile formed the Polisario, seeking independence for the whole of Spanish Sahara as Western Sahara, and began a low-level guerrilla campaign. An International Court of Justice ruling on the matter in October 1975 stated that neither the Moroccan nor Mauritanian claims to Western Sahara were strong enough to justify annexation, and that the Saharawi people should be allowed to determine their own future. Morocco thereafter sought to settle the matter militarily, and in November 1975 conducted the 'Green March', in which thousands of soldiers and Moroccan nationalists forcibly crossed the Morocco-Spanish Sahara border. Spain's dictator Francisco Franco was at this time near-death, and the country was unwilling to respond militarily at such a delicate time, keen to avoid the kind of drawn-out colonial war that had bedevilled Portugal in its African colonies. Spain therefore signed a treaty with Morocco and Mauritania, splitting Spanish Sahara roughly in two, roughly two-thirds in Morocco's favour. Morocco thereafter absorbed their section into Morocco and the Algeria–Western Sahara border effectively became a continuation of the Algeria–Morocco border. Polisario forces declared a Sahrawi Arab Democratic Republic based on the boundaries of Spanish Sahara, thus starting a long war against Morocco and Mauritania. Unwilling to continue the conflict, Mauritania pulled out of their zone in 1979, which was then annexed by Morocco. Algeria opposed the annexation and provided shelter for the Polisario Saharawi nationalist militia and Saharawi refugees on its territory, most notably around the town of Tindouf.

In the 1980s, in an effort to control the territory and stymie the Polisario, Morocco began building a number of elaborate walls (or 'berms'), eventually completing the Moroccan Western Sahara Wall in 1987. Morocco and Polisario signed a ceasefire agreement in 1991 ending the war; Morocco retained control of areas west of the wall (roughly 80% of Western Sahara), with Polisario controlling those east, including the border with Algeria. At present the dispute remains unresolved.
