= Sahrawi nationalism =

Ideology supporting indigenous rule of Western Sahara

Sahrawi nationalism (Arabic: القومية الصحراوية; Spanish: Nacionalismo saharaui) is a political ideology that seeks self-determination of the Sahrawi people, the indigenous population of Western Sahara. It has historically been represented by the Polisario Front. It came as a reaction against Spanish colonialist policies imposed from 1958 on, and subsequently in reaction to the Mauritanian and Moroccan invasions of 1975.

Its main opposing ideologies have been Spanish colonialism (Spanish Sahara, 1884–1975), Mauritanian irredentism (Tiris al-Gharbiyya, 1975–1979) and Moroccan irredentism (Southern Provinces, 1975-present).

Flag of the Sahrawi Arab Democratic Republic

== History ==
=== Before the 1950s ===
Sahrawi activist Tekber Ahmed Saleh explains the origins of Sahrawi nationalism, 2019.

In 1884, Spain set up a colony on the Rio de Oro bay (Villa Cisneros, current day Dakhla). Despite considering the entire territory of current-day Western Sahara as its possession, beyond a handful of coastal settlements, Spain did not have effective control over the desert hinterland due to its harsh climatic conditions and the presence of small, nomadic groups, among whom intertribal conflicts were frequent.

=== Spanish colonialism ===
In 1957, Sahrawis began to enroll in the Moroccan Army of Liberation and launched attacks against French positions in southwestern Algeria and the extreme north of Mauritania, capitalizing on Western Sahara’s strategic location. In Western Sahara itself, by the end of 1957, the Sahrawi contingent of the guerilla movement forced the Spanish army to retreat near Sidi Ifni.

In December 1966, the General Assembly of the United Nations adopted a resolution and proposed an UN-supervised self-determination referendum in Western Sahara.

In 1971, university students began to organize the Movement for the Liberation of Saguia el Hamra and Wadi el Dhahab, formally constituted as the Polisario Front in 1973. Ten days after its founding, the Polisario Front launched a guerilla war against the Spanish.

King Hassan II of Morocco rallied political support and announced that his country would oppose independence as an option in the Western Sahara referendum. In response, Spain stalled and postponed the long-planned self-determination referendum, which caused dismay among the Sahrawi population, especially the youth.

In 1975, the United Nations sent an official mission to Western Sahara to investigate the neighboring countries' claims over the territory and the will of the Sahrawi population. They reported that "the population, or at least almost all those persons encountered on the mission, was categorically for independence" and that the Polisario Front was widely seen as a dominant, legitimate political force in the territory. This was attested by pro-Polisario demonstrations in many locations that the United Nations mission visited.

Still in 1975, Morocco, Mauritania, and Spain signed the Madrid Accords, which divided Western Sahara’s territory between Morocco (northern two-third) and Mauritania (southern one-third). In 1979, Mauritania withdrew its troops from the territory and, in 1984, officially recognized the Sahrawi Arab Democratic Republic (SADR).

=== Moroccan occupation ===
Following Mauritania’s withdrawal, Morocco occupied the rest of the territory of Western Sahara. During the 1980s, little changed in the conflict between Morocco and the Sahrawi population. Meanwhile, Sahrawi nationalists and the United Nations agreed that a referendum on self-determination would be the best way to put an end to the military conflict between Morocco and the SADR. The vote would have been between complete independence and integration with Morocco. At the time, Morocco saw this as the best way to legitimate its claim and hold on the territory. In 1991, the UN established the United Nations Mission for the Referendum in Western Sahara (MINURSO), which paved the way for a cease-fire agreement between Morocco and the SADR. However, the planned referendum never became a reality.

According to Human Rights Watch, as of 2023, "draconian laws [are] used by prosecutors [of the Moroccan government] to punish even peaceful advocacy for self-determination".

== See also ==
- Sahrawi nationality law
- Decolonization of Africa
- UN Mission for the Referendum in Western Sahara
- Berberism
- Western Sahara War
- Western Sahara conflict
- Western Saharan clashes (2020–present)
