= Guelta Zemmur =

Guelta Zemmur گلتة زمور El Guelta
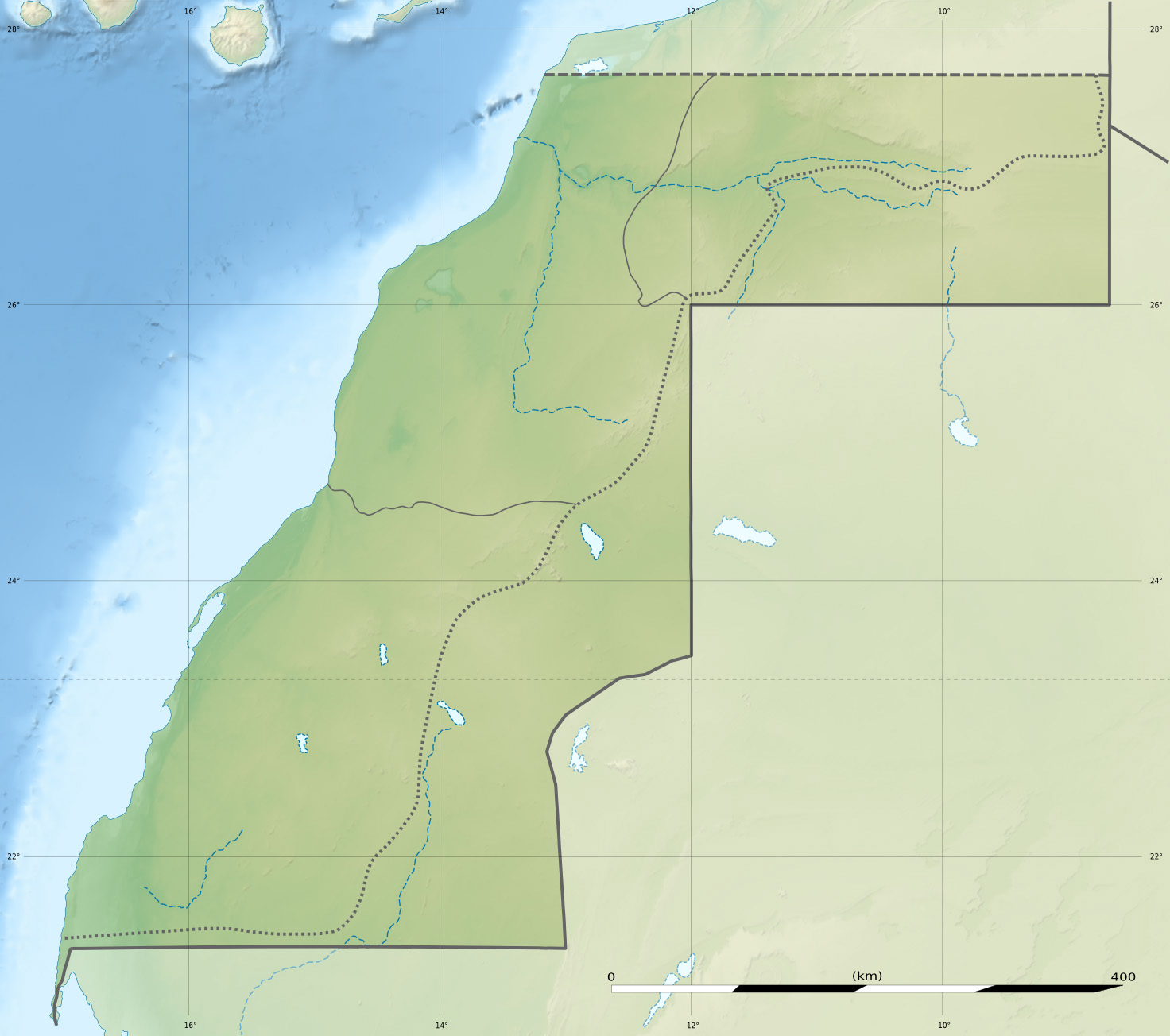
- Location in Western Sahara Guelta Zemmur (Africa)
- Coordinates: 25°09′N 12°22′W
- Country: Western Sahara
- Claimed by: Morocco, (Sahrawi Arab Democratic Republic) Sahrawi Republic
- Controlled by: Morocco

Area
  - Total: 19.51 km^{2} (7.53 sq mi)

Population (2004)
  - Total: 6,740
  - Density: 345/km^{2} (895/sq mi)
- Time zone: UTC+0 (GMT)

Guelta Zemmur is a small town or village in the Moroccan-occupied part of the territory of Western Sahara.

The town is based around a guelta or oasis, retaining rainwater for long periods. It was a camp site for the Sahrawi nomads of the area for hundreds of years.

It functioned as one of the most important military strongholds for the indigenous Polisario Front guerrilla after the retreat of Spain from what was then Spanish Sahara. As Morocco and Mauritania asserted control over the former Spanish colony from the north and south according to the Madrid Accords, Guelta Zemmur acted as a stopping-point for refugees en route to the Sahrawi refugee camps in Tindouf, Algeria.

It was also noted for the Guelta Zemmur conference on November 28, 1975, on the heels of the Ain Ben Tili conference. A gathering of the formerly Spanish-backed Djema'a was held in the town (then under Polisario control), where it agreed to support Polisario and dissolve itself to leave room for a future Western Sahara government. The Polisario argues that this is the Sahrawi Arab Democratic Republic, an exile government operative in Tindouf, which was declared in February the following year.

During the 1975-91 war between Polisario and Morocco, there were several battles over control of Guelta Zemmur, the heaviest taking place on March 24–27 and October 13, 1981. Presently, the town is occupied by Morocco as part of what it claims as its Southern Provinces, but its final status is yet to be determined. It now holds a Moroccan military base with a satellite communications center, and the areas around the town (which is close to the Moroccan Berm) are heavily mined.

The town is the birthplace of Sahrawi human rights defender Mohammed Daddach, who is Morocco's longest serving political prisoner.
