= Ras el-Khanfra =

Hill in Western Sahara

Ras el-Khanfra is a small hill at the foot of the Zini Mountains in Western Sahara.

The hill saw some of the fiercest fighting in the Western Sahara War between Morocco and the Polisario Front. Several thousand Moroccan troops dug in there in August 1980, with Polisario guerrillas staging almost continuous raids on them until February 1981.
