= 12th meridian =

12th meridian may refer to:

- 12th meridian east, a line of longitude east of the Greenwich Meridian
- 12th meridian west, a line of longitude west of the Greenwich Meridian
