= Russian-speaking Ukrainian Nationalists =

Ukrainian organisation founded 2013

Russian-speaking Ukrainian Nationalists (RUN) (Ukrainian: Російськомовні українські націоналісти, romanized: Rosiiskomovni ukrainski natsionalisty (RUN) (РУН)) is a Ukrainian organization founded in the summer of 2013. RUN is a platform for Russians in Ukraine who are Ukrainian patriots and supporters of Ukrainian independence. It has a territorial nationalistic worldview. Run is led by Serhiy Zamilyuhin.

== History ==
The organization is the offspring of a social movement that appeared in the form of groups in social networks and became an NGO in the summer of 2013.

RUN stated in November 2014 that it aimed to take part in the October 2015 Ukrainian local elections. But in October 2015 no such party named Russian-speaking Ukrainian Nationalists was registered at the Ukrainian Ministry of Justice. In the October 2015 Kyiv local election the organization took part as a "non-party" on the election list of the Patriotic Party of Ukraine.

== Ideology and stances ==
One of the organization's goals is to change the Ukrainian educational system so that children will learn "Russian-Ukrainian" instead of the Russian language since the organization believes the latter one was "historically imposed". The NGO has handed out pamphlets "to debunk the Soviet myths" about the Ukrainian Insurgent Army (in the summer of 2013).
