= Territorial nationalism =

National identity based form of nationalism

Territorial nationalism describes a form of nationalism based on the belief that all inhabitants of a particular territory should share a common national identity, regardless of their ethnic, linguistic, religious, cultural and other differences. Depending on the political or administrative status of a particular territory, territorial nationalism can be manifested on two basic levels, as territorial nationalism of distinctive sovereign states, or territorial nationalism of distinctive sub-sovereign regions (regional nationalism).

Within sovereign nation states, territorial nationalism is manifested as a belief that all inhabitants of that nation owe allegiance to their country of birth or adoption. According to territorial nationalism, every individual must belong to a nation, but can choose which one to join. A sacred quality is sought in this nation and in the popular memories it evokes. Citizenship is idealized by a territorial nationalist. A criterion of a territorial nationalism is the establishment of a mass, public culture based on common values and traditions of the population. Legal equality is essential for territorial nationalism.

Because citizenship rather than ethnicity is idealized by territorial nationalism, it is argued by Athena S. Leoussi and Anthony D. Smith (in 2001) that the French Revolution was a territorial nationalistic uprising.

Territorial nationalism is also connected to the concepts of Lebensraum, forced expulsion, ethnic cleansing and sometimes even genocide when one nation claims a certain imaginary territory and wants to get rid of other nations living on it. These territorial aspirations are part of the goal of an ethnically pure nation-state. This also sometimes leads to irredentism, since some nationalists demand that the state and nation are incomplete if an entire nation is not included into one single state, and thus aims to include members of its nations from a neighboring country. This thus often leads to ethnic conflict. Thomas Ambrosio argues: "If the leader of state A sends material support and/or actual troops into state B in the hopes of detaching state A's diaspora from state B, this would clearly be an indication of ethno-territorial nationalism".

== Territorial nationalism in Europe ==
In Western Europe national identity tends to be more based on where a person is born than in Central and Eastern Europe. Scholars have argued this might be explained by the fact that states in the latter two emerged from imperial states. The communist regimes in the Eastern Bloc actively suppressed what they described as "bourgeois nationalism" and considered nationalism a bourgeois ideology. In the Soviet Union this led to Russification and other attempts to replace the other cultures of the Soviet Union with the Russian culture, even while, at the same time the Soviet Union promoted certain forms of nationalism that it considered compatible with Soviet interests. Yugoslavia was different from the other European Communist states, where Yugoslavism was promoted.

== Territorial nationalism in the Middle East ==
Although territorial nationalism is in contrast with the universality of Islam, especially Egypt and Tunisia had territorial nationalistic policies after gaining independence. This was gradually replaced by Pan-Arabism in the 1950s, but Pan-Arabism declined by the mid-1970s.

== Territorial nationalism in Africa ==
In Africa, the prime examples of territorial nationalism are the overlapping irredentist concepts of Greater Morocco and Greater Mauritania. While Mauritania has since relinquished any claims to territories outside its internationally recognized borders, Morocco continues to occupy lands south of Morocco, referred to as its "Southern Provinces".

== Territorial nationalism in North America ==
Just as in Western Europe, national identity tends to be more based on where a person is born than ethnicity.

== See also ==
- Irredentism
- Jus soli
- Nation-building
- Peripheral nationalism
- State nationalism
- Territorial integrity
