= Bicentennial map of the Republic of Argentina =

2010 map for use in Argentine public education

The Bicontinental map of the Republic of Argentina was released in 1947 by the Instituto Geográfico Militar (IGM), currently called Instituto Geográfico Nacional (IGN). In 2010, it was established by law 26651 as a mandatory map for public education.

The main difference of the map of Argentina is that the Argentine Antarctica is shown in the same scale as the continental Argentine territory, and the Tierra del Fuego Province is in the middle of the map, rather than the bottom. Rubén Címbaro, president of the IGN, said that the idea was to depict Argentina as a bicontinental country. Older maps simply depicted the Argentine Antarctica in a smaller square at the right, at a smaller scale.

The world map is a Mollweide projection, with the countries of the UNASUR in the middle.

All claims to Antarctica are suspended by the Antarctic Treaty System. Nevertheless, some claimant countries continue to include Antarctica on their national maps. The map was criticized by historian Hilda Sábato and geographer Carlos Reboratti, who considered it a product of territorial nationalism.
