= Opération Lamantin =

French military intervention

- Part of the Western Sahara War
Date	December 1977 – July 1978
Location	Nouadhibou and Zouérat, Mauritania
Result	Peace negotiation engaged between Mauritanian and Sahrawi forces.
Territorial changes	Mauritanian and French withdrawal

Belligerents
France; Mauritania	Sahrawi Arab Democratic Republic; Polisario Front

Commanders and leaders
Giscard d'Estaing; Moktar Ould Daddah	Unknown

Opération Lamantin (French for manatee) was a December 1977 – July 1978 military intervention by France on the behalf of the Mauritanian government, in its war against Sahrawi guerrilla fighters of the Polisario Front, seeking independence for Western Sahara. Airstrikes were launched in the provinces with the aim of stopping separatist raids in the rail route from the iron mines in Zouérat to the coast of Nouadhibou (the Mauritania Railway), and pushing them to release French hostages. France used Jaguar combat aircraft from Dakar Airbase. The bombings targeted areas around the railway, which was constantly raided by Polisario. The mission ended with the release of the hostages and the halt of Polisario's attacks on ore cargo.

However, the disastrous performance in the war was a major reason for the Mauritanian armed forces to overthrow Moktar Ould Daddah, the President of Mauritania in July 1978 and an immediate cease-fire with the Polisario. Mauritania subsequently pulled out of Western Sahara in 1979 and mended relations with their Sahrawi neighbours and went on to recognize them in 1984.

The French air campaign halted the Polisario attacks on ore cargos and obtained the release of their citizens from captivity.

== Background ==
The portions of Western Sahara was a Spanish Colony till 1975 and remained the last colonial province in Africa. A war erupted between Morocco and the Sahrawi national liberation movement, the Polisario Front, which proclaimed the Sahrawi Arab Democratic Republic (SADR) with a government in exile in Tindouf, Algeria. France, who had, along with former colonial power Spain, supported the takeover of Western Sahara, backed the regime of Mokhtar Ould Daddah, whom they had installed as President of Mauritania at the end of the colonial era in 1960. Both Mauritania and Morocco were supplied with new military hardware and generous economic aid, to enable them to maintain their grip on the territory. French personnel trained the Mauritanian army and took up important positions in the economy. All through Mauritania allied with Algeria to control the raising opposition of Morocco. But during 1974, they realigned their position and believed to have gone on a secret agreement with the king of Morocco. This eventually led to an agreement in 1975 that partitioned Spanish Sahara to both Mauritania and Morocco.

== Lamantin operation ==
In December 1977, President Giscard d'Estaing ordered the French Air Force to deploy in Mauritania and start bombing Polisario columns with napalm, after French civilian technicians were taken as hostages in a Polisario raid on the Zouerate iron ore mines, Mauritania's most precious economic asset (they were later released unharmed, although a French physician and his wife were killed during the attack).

France used Jaguar combat aircraft from Dakar Airbase. The bombings were targeted in the rail route from the iron mines in Zouerat to the coast of Nouadibou, which were obstructed by Polisario. Ould Daddah's regime still proved unable to fend off the guerrillas, and his disastrous performance in the war was a major reason for the Mauritanian armed forces decision to overthrow him a year later and institute an immediate cease-fire with the Polisario. Mauritania subsequently pulled out of Western Sahara in 1979 and mended relations with their Sahrawi neighbours (Mauritania recognised the Sahrawi Arab Democratic Republic in 1984), who carried on the fight against Morocco.

== See also ==
- List of France's military operations
