= Western Sahara War =

1975–1991 armed conflict between Morocco and the Polisario Front

- Part of the Cold War and the Western Sahara conflict
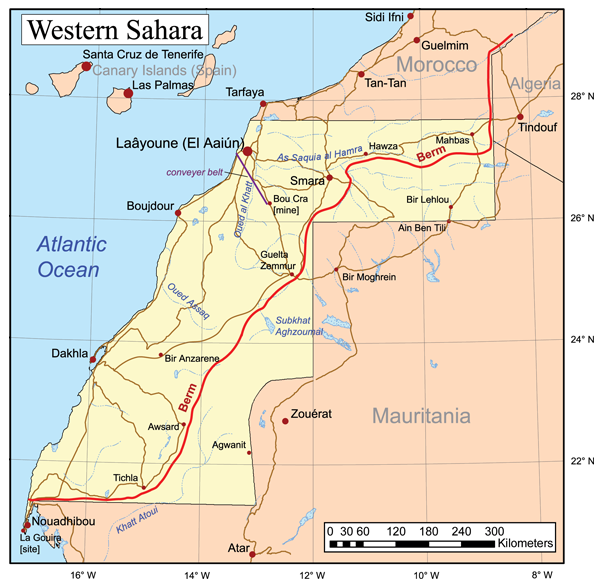
- Map of the Western Sahara; the red line is the military berm built by Morocco
Date	31 October 1975 – 6 September 1991 (15 years, 10 months and 6 days)
Location	Western Sahara
Result	Inconclusive: Spanish complete withdrawal under the Madrid Accords (1976); Mauritanian retreat and withdrawal of territorial claims and peace agreement with the Polisario Front.; Military stalemate; Ceasefire agreed on between the Polisario Front and Morocco (1991)
Territorial changes	Morocco controls approximately 80% of the territory, the Polisario Front controls 20%

Belligerents
Morocco; (Morocco) Moroccan Armed Forces; Mauritania (1975–1979); France (1977–1978); (France) French Air and Space Force	Sahrawi Republic; (Sahrawi Arab Democratic Republic) Polisario Front; Algeria

Commanders and leaders
(Morocco) Hassan II (Morocco) Ahmed Dlimi (Morocco) Abdelaziz Bennani (Morocco) Housni Benslimane (Mauritania) Mokhtar Ould Daddah (Mauritania) Mustafa Ould Salek (Mauritania) Mohamed Khouna Ould Haidallah	(Sahrawi Arab Democratic Republic) Mohamed Abdelaziz (Sahrawi Arab Democratic Republic) El-Ouali Mustapha Sayed † (Sahrawi Arab Democratic Republic) Brahim Ghali (Sahrawi Arab Democratic Republic) Lahbib Ayoub (Sahrawi Arab Democratic Republic) Mohamed Ali El Admi

Strength
(Morocco) 30,000 (1976); 60,000 (1980); 150,000 (1988); 120,000 (1991) (Mauritania) 3,000–5,000 (1976); 12,000 (1977); 18,000 (1978)	5,000 (1976); 15,000 (1980); 8,000 (1988)

Casualties and losses
(Morocco) Unknown; 2,155–2,300 captured (Mauritania) 2,000 soldiers killed	Unknown
- Civilian Casualties: More than 3,000 Sahrawis killed (Eckhardt,1985) 3 West German pilots killed 853+ (Project Disappeared) – 1,500 (International Federation of Human Rights) Sahrawis missing 40,000 (1976) – 80,000 (1977) Sahrawis displaced Estimated death toll: 10,000–20,000

The Western Sahara War (Note: Arabic: حرب الصحراء الغربية, French: Guerre du Sahara occidental, Spanish: Guerra del Sáhara Occidental) was an armed conflict between the Sahrawi indigenous Polisario Front and Morocco from 1975 to 1991 (and Mauritania from 1975 to 1979), being the most significant phase of the Western Sahara conflict. The conflict erupted after the withdrawal of Spain from the Spanish Sahara in accordance with the Madrid Accords (signed under the pressure of the Green March), by which it transferred administrative control of the territory to Morocco and Mauritania, but not sovereignty. In late 1975, the Moroccan government organized the Green March of some 350,000 Moroccan citizens, escorted by around 20,000 troops, who entered Western Sahara, trying to establish a Moroccan presence. While at first met with just minor resistance by the Polisario Front, Morocco later engaged a long period of guerrilla warfare with the Sahrawi nationalists. During the late 1970s, the Polisario Front, desiring to establish an independent state in the territory, attempted to fight both Mauritania and Morocco. In 1979, Mauritania withdrew from the conflict after signing a peace treaty with the Polisario Front. The war continued in low intensity throughout the 1980s, though Morocco made several attempts to take the upper hand in 1989–1991. A cease-fire agreement was finally reached between the Polisario Front and Morocco in September 1991. Some sources put the final death toll between 10,000 and 20,000 people.

The Western Sahara conflict has since shifted from military to civilian resistance. A peace process, attempting to resolve the conflict has not yet produced any permanent solution to Sahrawi refugees and territorial agreement between Morocco and the Sahrawi Republic. Today most of the territory of Western Sahara is under Moroccan occupation, while the inland parts are governed by the Sahrawi Arab Democratic Republic, managed by the Polisario Front.

== Background ==
=== Spanish Sahara ===
In 1884 Spain claimed a protectorate over the coast from Cape Bojador to Cap Blanc. Later, the Spanish extended their area of control. In 1958 Spain joined the previously separate districts of Saguia el-Hamra (in the north) and Río de Oro (in the south) to form the province of Spanish Sahara.

Raids and rebellions by the indigenous Saharan population kept the Spanish forces out of much of the territory for a long time. Ma al-Aynayn, the Saharan Caïd of Smara, started an uprising against France in the 1910s, at a time when the French had expanded their influence and control in North-West Africa, he died in the same year and his son Ahmed al-Hiba succeeded him. French forces defeated him when he tried to conquer Marrakesh, and in retaliation, severely damaged the holy city of Smara in 1913. Not until the second destruction of Smara in 1934, by joint Spanish and French forces, did the territory finally become subdued. Another uprising in 1956–1958, initiated by the Moroccan Army of Liberation, led to heavy fighting, but eventually the Spanish forces regained control, again with French aid. However, unrest simmered, and in 1967 the Harakat Tahrir arose to challenge Spanish rule peacefully. After the events of the Zemla Intifada in 1970, when Spanish police destroyed the organization and "disappeared" its founder, Muhammad Bassiri, Sahrawi nationalism again took a militant turn.

=== Conception of the Polisario Front ===
In 1971 a group of young Sahrawi students began organizing what came to be known as The Embryonic Movement for the Liberation of Saguia el-Hamra and Rio de Oro. After attempting in vain to gain backing from several Arab governments, including both Algeria and Morocco, but only drawing faint notices of support from Libya and Mauritania, the movement eventually relocated to Spanish-controlled Western Sahara to start an armed rebellion.

=== The beginnings of armed struggle ===
The Polisario Front was formally constituted on 10 May 1973 in the Mauritanian city of Zouérat, with the express intention of militarily forcing an end to Spanish colonization. Its first Secretary General was El-Ouali Mustapha Sayed. On 20 May he led the Khanga raid, Polisario's first armed action, in which a Spanish post manned by a team of Tropas Nomadas (Sahrawi-staffed auxiliary forces) was overrun and rifles seized. Polisario then gradually gained control over large swaths of desert countryside, and its power grew from early 1975 when the Tropas Nomadas began deserting to the Polisario, bringing weapons and training with them. At this point, Polisario's manpower included perhaps 800 men, but they were backed by a larger network of supporters. A UN visiting mission headed by Simeon Aké that was conducted in June 1975 concluded that Sahrawi support for independence (as opposed to Spanish rule or integration with a neighbouring country) amounted to an "overwhelming consensus".

== Timeline ==
=== Spanish withdrawal ===
After Spain started negotiating a handover of power in mid 1975, on 31 October, Moroccan troops crossed into the territory from the north-east, advancing towards Mahbes and Farciya.

The Moroccan government organized the Green March of some 350,000 Moroccan citizens, escorted by around 20,000 troops, who entered Western Sahara, trying to establish Moroccan presence. Due to this pressure, Spain entered negotiations that led to the signing of the Madrid Accords, by which it ceded the administrative control of the territory to Mauritania and Morocco on 14 November 1975. The United Nations did not officially recognize the accord, considering Spain as the administrative power of the territory. In late 1975, as a result of the Moroccan advance, tens of thousands of Sahrawis fled Morocco-controlled cities into the desert, building up improvised refugee camps in Amgala, Tifariti and Umm Dreiga.

=== Moroccan invasion ===
On 11 December 1975, the first Moroccan troops arrived in El Aaiún, and fighting erupted with the Polisario Front. On 20 December, Mauritanian troops succeeded taking over Tichla and La Güera after two weeks of siege. On 27 January 1976, the First Battle of Amgala erupted between Morocco and Algeria with the Polisario. In January 1976, the Royal Moroccan Air Force also bombed the refugee camps in the northern part of the territory. The following month, Moroccan jets attacked the Umm Dreiga refugee camps with napalm and white phosphorus bombs, killing thousands of civilians.

On 26 February 1976, Spain officially announced its full withdrawal from the area.

=== Declaration of Sahrawi Republic and guerilla warfare ===
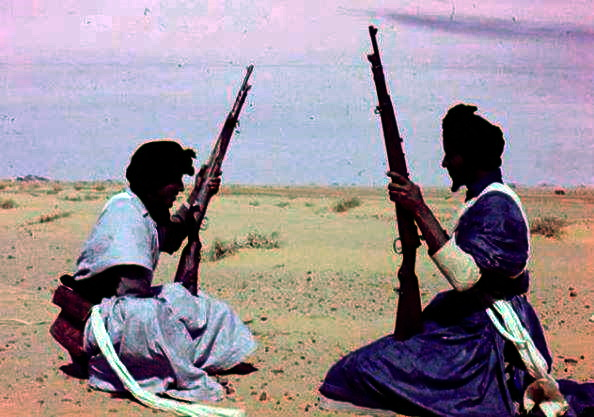
Sahrawi soldiers of the Polisario Front in 1979.

The Polisario Front proclaimed the Sahrawi Arab Democratic Republic on 27 February 1976 and waged a guerrilla war against both Morocco and Mauritania. The World Court at the Hague had issued its verdict on the former Spanish colony just weeks before, which each party interpreted as confirming its rights on the disputed territory. After the completion of the Spanish withdrawal, and in the application of the Madrid Accords in 1976, Morocco took over the Saguia El Hamra and the northern two-thirds of the territory, while Mauritania took control of the southern third; this was formalized under the Western Sahara partition agreement.

The Polisario Front retaliated with guerrilla attacks and moved their base to Tindouf in western Algeria, where first refugee camps were established in May 1976. For the next two years the Polisario movement grew tremendously, as Sahrawi refugees flocked to the camps fleeing from the Moroccan and Mauritanian armies, while Algeria and Libya supplied arms and funding.

Within months after the 1975–1976 Moroccan offensive, the Polisario had expanded to thousands of armed fighters. The reorganized army was able to inflict severe damage through guerrilla-style hit-and-run attacks against Moroccan forces in Western Sahara but also raided cities and towns in Morocco and Mauritania proper.

=== Mauritanian and French involvement ===
Mauritania, under the regime of President Moktar Ould Daddah, had a weakened army of 3,000 men which was unable to fend off the attacks by the Polisario. After repeated strikes at the country's principal source of income, the iron mines of Zouerate, the Government was nearly incapacitated by the lack of funds and the ensuing internal disorder. Ethnic unrest in the Mauritanian Armed Forces also strongly contributed to the ineffectiveness of the army: forcibly conscripted black Africans from the south of the country resisted getting involved in what they viewed as a northern intra-Arab dispute, and the tribes of northern Mauritania often sympathized with Polisario, fearing possible Moroccan regional ambitions and perceived increasing dependence of the Daddah regime on Moroccan support.

In 1977, France intervened after a group of French technicians was taken prisoner during a raid on the Zouerate iron mines, codenaming its involvement Opération Lamantin. The French Air Force deployed SEPECAT Jaguar jets to Mauritania in 1978 under the orders of President Valéry Giscard d'Estaing, which repeatedly bombed Polisario columns headed for Mauritania with napalm. The Polisario Front launched a raid on the capital Nouakchott, during which Polisario chief and leader El Ouali was killed, and was replaced by Mohamed Abdelaziz, with no letup in the pace of attacks.

Under continued pressure, the Daddah regime finally fell in summer 1978 to a coup d'état led by war-weary military officers, who immediately agreed to a ceasefire with the Polisario. A comprehensive peace treaty was signed on 5 August 1979, in which the new Mauritanian government recognized Sahrawi rights to Western Sahara and relinquished its own claims. Mauritania withdrew all its forces and would later proceed to formally recognize the Sahrawi Arab Democratic Republic, causing a massive rupture in relations with Morocco. King Hassan II of Morocco immediately claimed the area of Western Sahara evacuated by Mauritania (Tiris al-Gharbiya, roughly corresponding to the southern half of Río de Oro), which was unilaterally annexed by Morocco on 11 August 1979.

=== Stalemate (1980s) ===
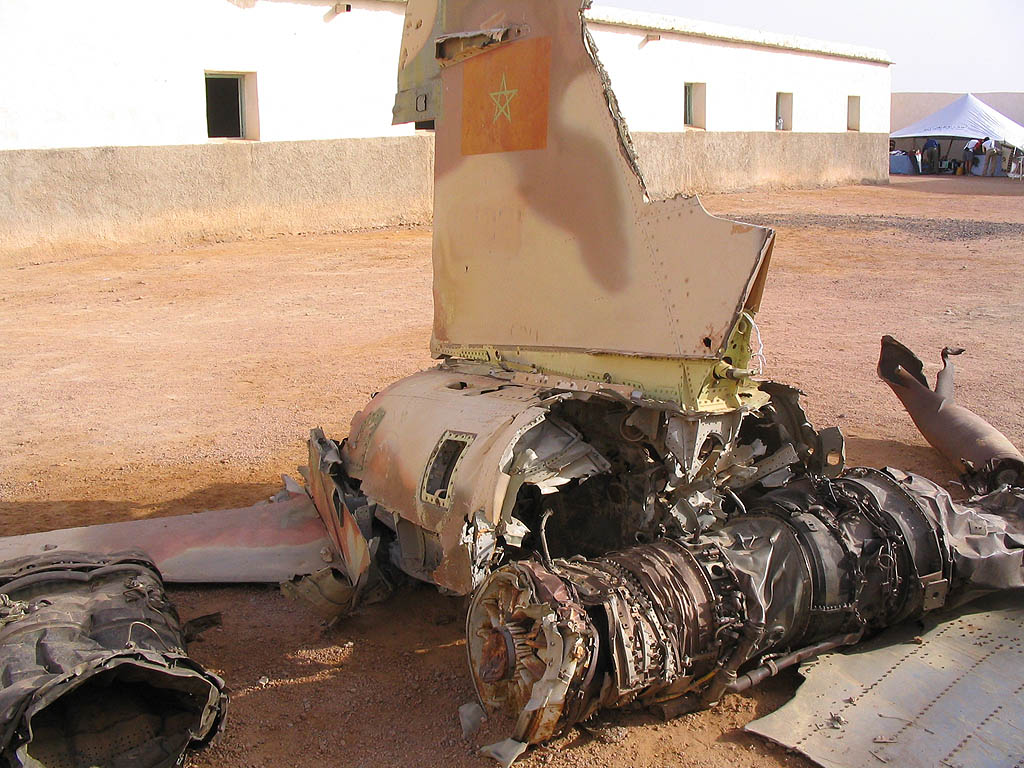
Pieces of a Moroccan bomber aircraft shot down in Tifariti by the Polisario Front during the war

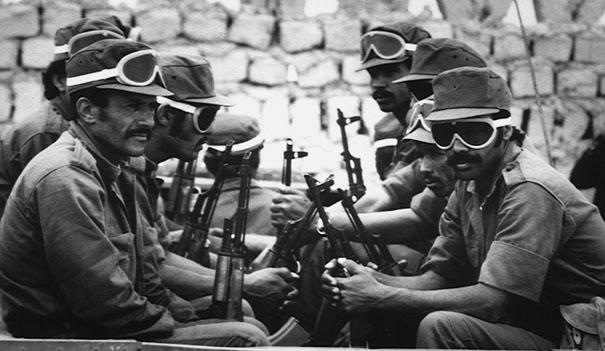
Sahrawi soldiers, 1985

From the mid-1980s Morocco largely had kept Polisario troops off by building a huge berm or sand wall (the Moroccan Wall). The Moroccan army stationed a number of troops roughly the same size as the entire Sahrawi population to defend the wall, enclosing the Southern Provinces, the economically useful parts of Western Sahara (Bou Craa, El-Aaiun, Smara etc.). This stalemated the war, with no side able to achieve decisive gains, but artillery strikes and sniping attacks by the guerrillas continued, and Morocco was economically and politically strained by the war. Morocco faced heavy burdens due to the economic costs of its massive troop deployments along the Wall. Economic and military aid was sent to Morocco by Saudi Arabia, France and the United States to relieve the situation, but matters gradually became unsustainable for all parties involved.

=== Escalation (1989–1991) ===
On 7 October 1989, the Polisario launched an attack against Moroccan troops in Guelta Zemmour (Centre of Western Sahara) and Algeria, but sustained heavy casualties and withdrew, leaving behind more than 18 tanks and a dozen other vehicles. This setback led the Polisario to consider a ceasefire.

The 1991 Tifariti offensive, from August to September, was the last military operation in the Western Sahara War, launched by Moroccan forces against the Polisario. The Royal Moroccan Army (RMA) conducted offensive operations in the areas of Mehaires, Tifariti, and Bir Lahlou, and cleared the area of any Polisario presence.

== Cease-fire and aftermath ==
Moroccan walls in the territory of Western Sahara, during the Western Sahara war (1975–1991). In yellow, the territory under control by the Polisario Front.

A cease-fire between the Polisario and Morocco, monitored by MINURSO (UN), came into effect on 6 September 1991, with the promise of a referendum on independence the following year. The referendum, however, stalled over disagreements on voter rights, and numerous attempts at restarting the process (most significantly the launching of the 2003 Baker plan) have failed. The prolonged cease-fire has held without major disturbances, but Polisario has repeatedly threatened to resume fighting if no break-through occurs. Morocco's withdrawal from both the terms of the original Settlement Plan and the Baker Plan negotiations in 2003 left the peace-keeping mission without a political agenda, which further increased the risks of renewed war.

In mid-October 2020 tensions deepened between Morocco and the Polisario Front, when the Sahrawi refugees in Tindouf, Algeria, which houses about 100,000 Sahrawi refugees, passing through SADR-controlled territories, camped and blocked the road, creating a large caravan of vehicles and blocking traffic in the region. Morocco, which regards the region as vital to trade with sub-Saharan Africa, accused the Polisario Front of infiltrating the buffer zone and "carrying out acts of banditry" in Guerguerat. On 13 November 2020 clashes between Moroccan and the Polisario Front forces began in Guerguerat and spread along the Moroccan Western Sahara Wall. Morocco claimed that it had acted in self-defence, while the Polisario Front accused Morocco of violating the ceasefire by entering the buffer zone and urged the United Nations to intervene. On 8 April 2021, the head of the Sahrawi National Guard, Addah Al-Bendir, was killed by what reports claim to be a drone strike while attempting a raid on Moroccan positions along the sand wall.

== International incidents ==
On 17 January 1980, the Spanish destroyer Almirante Ferrandiz was machine-gunned by a Moroccan Mirage fighter aircraft, 8 kilometres (5 mi) from the southern coast of Western Sahara. The Spanish destroyer had received an SOS from a Spanish fishing vessel that had been previously detained by a Moroccan patrol boat.

In 1984, Polisario shot down a Belgian airplane as well as two Moroccan aircraft.

On 24 February 1985, the Polar 3, a Dornier 228-type research airplane from the Alfred Wegener Institute was shot down by guerrillas of the Polisario Front over Western Sahara. All three crew members died. Polar 3, together with unharmed Polar 2, was on its way back from Antarctica and had taken off in Dakar, Senegal, to reach Arrecife, Canary Islands. The German government, which did not recognize Morocco's claim to Western Sahara at the time and remained neutral in the conflict, heavily criticized the incident.

== See also ==
- Moroccan Western Sahara Wall
- Tiris al-Gharbiyya
- History of Western Sahara
- Political status of Western Sahara
- Ifni War
- Battle of Smara (1979)
