= Western Sahara partition agreement =

Treaty between Mauritania and Morocco

Convention concerning the State frontier line
- Territorial control in Western Sahara per the initial annexation in 1976 by Morocco and Mauritania
- Type: Partition agreement
- Signed: 14 April 1976
- Location: Rabat, Morocco
- Signatories: Ahmed Laraki; Hamdi Ould Mouknass
- Parties: Morocco; Mauritania

The Western Sahara partition agreement, formally the Convention concerning the State frontier line, was a treaty signed at Rabat on 14 April 1976 between Morocco and Mauritania to partition the disputed territory of Western Sahara following the withdrawal of Spain under the Madrid Accords. The border was defined as a straight line from the intersection of the coastline and the 24th parallel north, through the intersection of the 23rd parallel north and the 13th meridian west, and continuing until the pre-existing borders of Mauritania. It was signed by Hamdi Ould Mouknass, the foreign minister of Mauritania, and Ahmed Laraki, the foreign minister of Morocco. Under the agreement, Morocco annexed the northern two-thirds of Western Sahara as its Southern Provinces, and Mauritania annexed the southern third as Tiris al-Gharbiyya.

The annexation ultimately occurred in two stages: 1976 and 1979. Mauritania renounced its claims and withdrew its troops on 5 August 1979 due to intense guerrilla warfare and pressure from the Polisario Front. This prompted Morocco to extend its annexation to the formerly Mauritanian-controlled areas, claiming the entirety of Western Sahara. Despite the partition and subsequent Moroccan takeover, the United Nations regards the annexation as null and void under international law, maintaining that the territory remains subject to the guidelines for a military occupation.

== Background ==
As Spain began the process of decolonization of Western Sahara, a number of international bodies were asked to opine on the territories' status. The UN visiting mission to Spanish Sahara, carried out in May 1975, published their report on 15 October 1975. On the next day, on 16 October 1975, the International Court of Justice Advisory Opinion on Western Sahara was published. Both reports supported a referendum of the people of Western Sahara; the ICJ report acknowledged that Western Sahara had historical links with Morocco and Mauritania, but not sufficient to prove the sovereignty of either State over the territory at the time of the Spanish colonization. The population of the territory thus possessed the right of self-determination.

== Start of the occupation ==
Shortly after Spain gave up control over Spanish Sahara in 1975, both Mauritania and Morocco occupied the territory. On 31 October 1975, Moroccan troops began an invasion of Western Sahara from the north. The Moroccan government’s Green March took place on 6 November 1975, in which 350,000 unarmed Moroccans converged on the city of Tarfaya in southern Morocco and waited for a signal from King Hassan II of Morocco to cross the border in a peaceful march. The Madrid Accords were signed by Spain with Morocco and Mauritania on 14 November 1975. The Moroccan and Mauritanian annexations were resisted by the Polisario Front, primarily by guerrilla warfare, which had gained backing from Algeria.

== Mauritanian withdrawal and further Moroccan annexation ==
On 5 August 1979, Mauritania renounced all territorial claims to Western Sahara and withdrew its troops due to pressure from Polisario, prompting Morocco to extend its annexation to formerly Mauritanian-controlled areas. Morocco subsequently claimed the entirety of Western Sahara. On 11 August 1979, Morocco extended its control and annexed the rest of the territory.

== International status and relations ==
Since World War II, it has been held in international law that any act of annexation is illegal. Likewise, the United Nations regards the Moroccan annexation of Western Sahara as null and void, such that the territory is not a legal part of Morocco and it remains subject to the international guidelines for a military occupation. As Morocco and the United States have had a close relationship since the former's independence, Morocco has enjoyed full American support throughout the Western Sahara conflict. In exchange for the Israel–Morocco normalization agreement in 2020, the United States officially recognized Western Sahara as part of Morocco, and urged the Sahrawi Arab Democratic Republic to "negotiate a mutually acceptable solution" using Morocco's Western Sahara Autonomy Proposal as the only framework. In 2023, Israel formally recognized Moroccan sovereignty over Western Sahara.

== See also ==
- Ifni War
- Falklands War
- Western Sahara War
