= Moroccan Western Sahara wall =

Barrier dividing the Western Sahara

Coordinates: 23.172°N 14.008°W

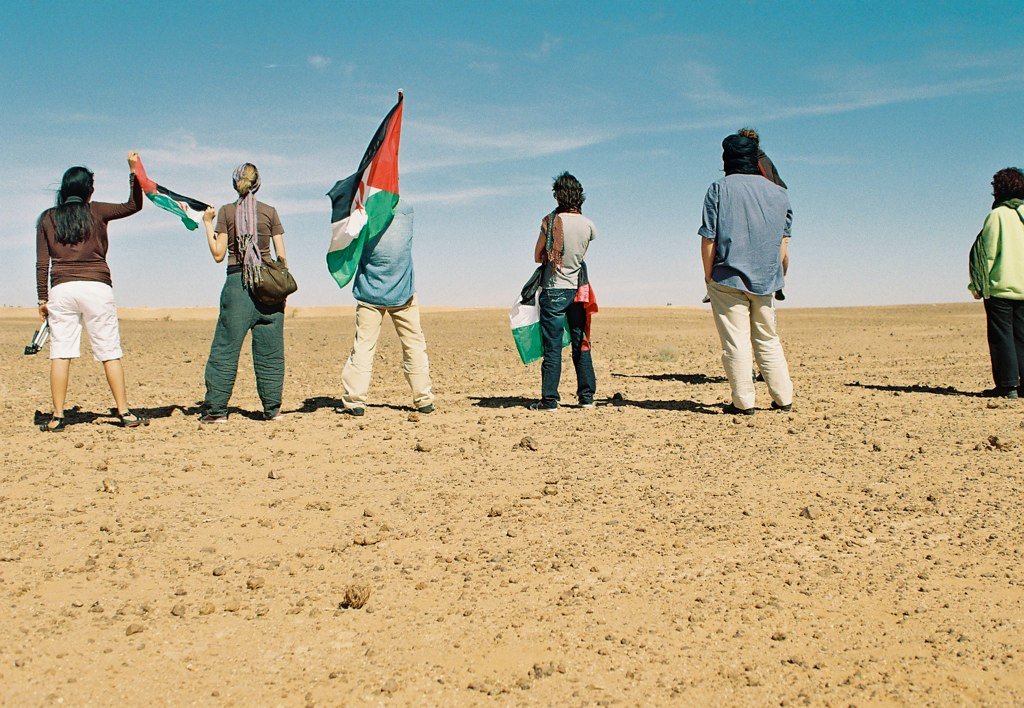
Protesters carrying Polisario flags in front of the Western Sahara berm (2011)

The Moroccan Western Sahara wall or the Berm, also called the Moroccan sand wall (Arabic: الجدار الرملي, romanized: al-jidār ar-ramlī, lit. 'sand wall'), is an approximately 2,700 km-long (1,700 mi) berm running south to north through Western Sahara and the southwestern portion of Morocco. It separates the Moroccan-occupied areas (the Southern Provinces) on the west from the Polisario-controlled areas (Free Zone, nominally Sahrawi Arab Democratic Republic) on the east. The wall was built in order to restrict independence-seeking Sahrawis to the eastern part of the desert, away from the region's natural resources, located in the Moroccan-occupied part of the territory.

According to maps from the United Nations Mission for the Referendum in Western Sahara (MINURSO) or the United Nations High Commissioner for Refugees (UNHCR), in many places the wall extends several kilometers into internationally recognized Mauritanian territory.

== Names ==
The wall is also called the Western Sahara berm and the Western Sahara separation barrier. The local Sahrawi people called it "The Wall of Shame".

== Physical structure ==
The fortifications lie in uninhabited or very sparsely inhabited territory. They consist of sand and stone walls or berms about 3 m (10 ft) in height, with bunkers, fences, and landmines throughout. The barrier minebelt that runs along the structure is thought to be the longest continuous minefield in the world. Military bases, artillery posts and airfields dot the Moroccan-occupied side of the wall at regular intervals, and radar masts and other electronic surveillance equipment scan the areas in front of it.

The following is one observer's description of the berm from 2001:

Physically, the berm is a 2 m [6 ft 7 in] high wall (with a backing trench), which rides along a topographical high point/ridge/hill throughout the territory. Spaced out over every 5 km [3 mi] are big, small and medium bases, with approximately 35–40 troops at each observation post and groups of 10 soldiers spaced out over the distance as well. About 4 km [2 1/2 mi] behind each major post there is a rapid reaction post, which includes backing mobile forces (tanks, etc). A series of overlapping fixed and mobile radars are also positioned throughout the berm. The radars are estimated to have a range of between 60 and 80 km [35 and 50 mi] into the Polisario-controlled territory, and are generally utilized to locate artillery fire onto detected Polisario forces. Information from the radar is processed by a forward-based commander, who contacts a rear-based artillery unit.

In all, six lines of berms have been constructed. The main ("external") line of fortifications extends for about 2,500 km (1,600 mi). It runs east from Guerguerat on the coast in the extreme south of Western Sahara near the Mauritanian town of Nouadhibou, closely parallelling the Mauritanian border for about 200 km (120 mi), before turning north beyond Tichla. It then runs generally northeastward, leaving Guelta Zemmur and Smara, again crossing Mauritanian territory and reaching Haouza in Moroccan-held territory, before turning east and again closely following the Algerian border as it approaches Morocco. A section extends about 200 km (120 mi) into southeastern Morocco.

Significant lines of fortifications also lie deep within the Moroccan-occupied area. Their exact number and location have been ignored and not well understood until 2004 by international commentators. All major settlements in Western Sahara, the capital Laayoune, and the phosphate mine at Bou Craa lie far into the Moroccan-held side.

== History ==
=== Construction ===
System of the Moroccan Walls in Western Sahara with chronology of their construction

The fortifications were progressively built by Moroccan forces starting in 1980, with help from French and Israeli experts alongside Saudi funding, with construction formally ending on 16 April 1987. The wall was built in six stages, and the area behind the wall was expanded from a small area near Morocco in the north to most of the western and central part of the country gradually. The walls built were:

- 1st wall (August 1980 – June 1982) surrounding the "useful triangle" of El Aaiún, Smara, and the phosphate mines at Bou Craa, built with the help of South African military engineers and Portuguese and French renegade mercenaries (c. 500 km (310 mi)).
- 2nd wall (December 1983 – January 1984) surrounding Amgala (c. 300 km (190 mi)).
- 3rd wall (April 1984 – May 1984) surrounding Jdiriya and Haouza (c. 320 km (200 mi)).
- 4th wall (December 1984 – January 1985) surrounding Mahbes and Farciya (c. 380 km (240 mi)).
- 5th wall (May–September 1985) surrounding Guelta Zemmur, Bir Anzarane, and Dakhla, again with the help of South African and Israeli experts (c. 670 km (420 mi))
- 6th wall (February–April 1987) surrounding Auserd, Tichla, and Bir Ganduz (c. 550 km (340 mi)).

=== 2005 expulsion incident ===
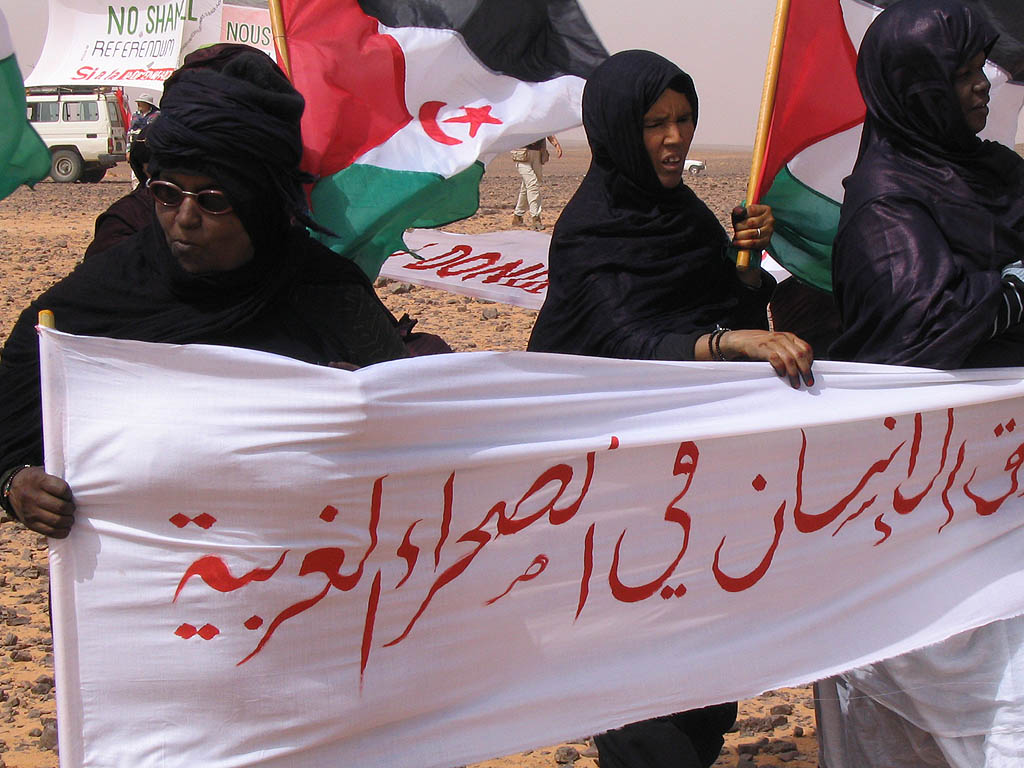
Sahrawi women hold a protest in Western Sahara on the eastern side of the wall

In the summer of 2005, the Moroccan Army accelerated the expulsion (begun in late 2004) of illegal immigrants detained in northern Morocco to the eastern side of the wall, into the Free Zone. The Polisario Front and the MINURSO rescued several dozen lost in the desert, who had run out of water. Others died of thirst. By October, the Polisario had received 22 immigrants in Mehaires, 46 in Tifariti and 97 in Bir Lehlu. They were from African countries (Gambia, Cameroon, Nigeria, Ghana, etc.), except a group of 48 who were from Bangladesh.

=== "The Thousand Column" demonstration ===
Since 2008, a demonstration called "The Thousand Column" is held annually in the desert against the barrier by international human rights activists and Sahrawi refugees. In the 2008 demonstration, more than 2,000 people (most of them Sahrawis and Spaniards, but also Algerians, Italians, and others) made a human chain demanding the demolition of the wall, the celebration of the self-determination referendum accorded by the UN and the parts in 1991, and the end of the Moroccan occupation of the territory.

During the 2009 demonstration, a teenage Sahrawi refugee named Ibrahim Hussein Leibeit lost half of his right leg in a landmine explosion. The incident happened when Leibeit and dozens of young Sahrawis crossed the line into a minefield while aiming to throw stones to the other side of the wall.

== Effect ==
Effectively, after the completion of the wall, Morocco has occupied the bulk of Western Sahara territory that lies to the north and west of it, calling these the kingdom's "Southern Provinces". The Polisario-founded Sahrawi Arab Democratic Republic controls the mostly uninhabited "Free Zone", which comprises all areas to the east of the barrier. Units from the United Nations mission MINURSO separate the two sides, and enforce cease-fire regulations.

== External reactions and opinions ==
Western attention to the wall, and to the Moroccan annexation of Western Sahara in general, has been minimal, apart from Spain. In Africa, the annexation of Western Sahara by Morocco has attracted somewhat more attention. Algeria supports the Polisario Front "in its long-running desert war to oppose Moroccan control of the disputed area". The Organization of African Unity/African Union (AU) and United Nations have proposed negotiated solutions.

The AU's stance on Western Sahara led to Morocco's exit from the organization. After a 33-year absence, Morocco rejoined on 30 January 2017, despite 9 member states voting against, but 39 supporting. Morocco was re-admitted with the understanding that Western Sahara will remain an AU member.

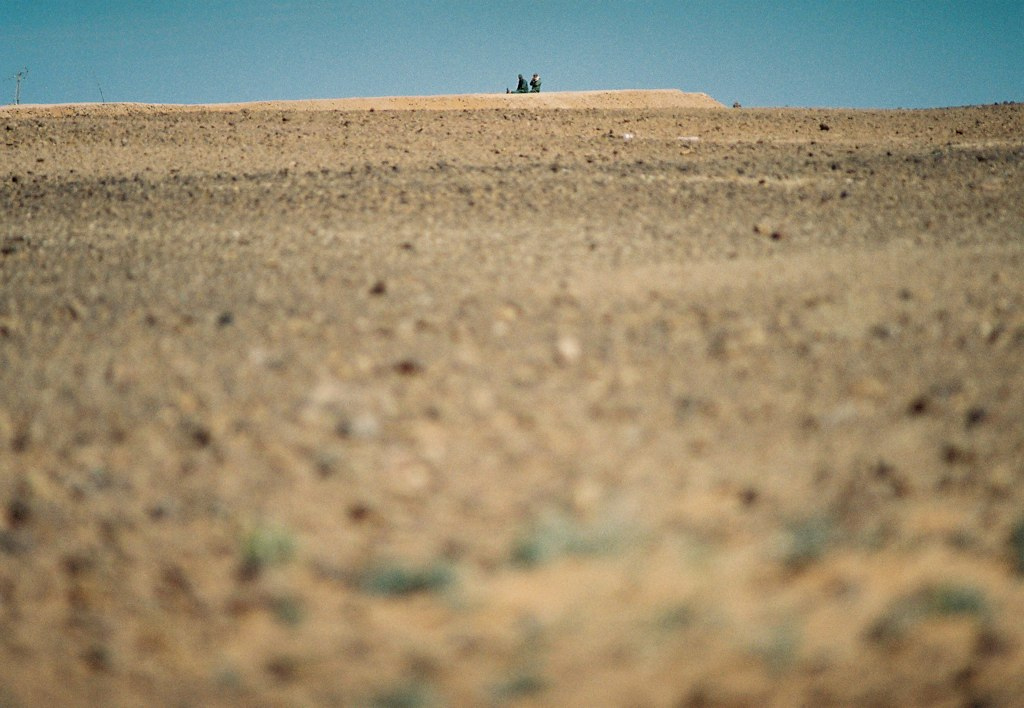
Wall east of Mahbes

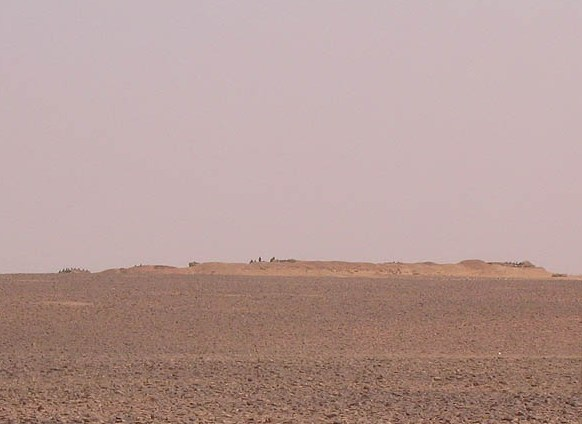
Wall south of Mahbes

== See also ==
- Defensive wall
- List of walls
- Wall of Shame
