= Tiris al-Gharbiyya =

Area of Western Sahara

Western Tiris تيرس الغربية (Arabic) Tīris al-Ġarbiyya
- Province of Mauritania
- 1975–1979
- Flag Seal

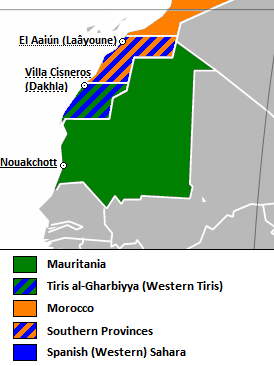
- The striped blue and green is Western Tiris.

Anthem
- النشيد الوطني الموريتاني "Nashid Wataniin Muritaniin"
- Capital: Dakhla
- Area
  - Coordinates: 23°43′N 15°57′W
  - 1977: 88,000 km^{2} (34,000 sq mi)
- Population
  - 1977: 12,897
- Government
  - Type: Province
- President
  - 1975–1978: Moktar Ould Daddah
  - 1978–1979: Mustafa Ould Salek
- History
  - Madrid Accords: 14 November 1975
  - Mauritanian invasion of Spanish Sahara: 27 November 1975
  - Partition of Spanish Sahara: 14 April 1976
  - Mauritania evacuates Western Tiris: 5 August 1979
  - Annexation of Western Tiris by Morocco: 11 August 1979
Preceded by
Spanish Sahara
Succeeded by
Southern Provinces
Ras Nouadhibou
Free Zone (region)

Tiris al-Gharbiyya (Arabic: تيرس الغربية, romanized: Tīris al-Ġarbiyya, lit. 'Western Tiris') was the name for the area of Western Sahara under Mauritanian control between 1975 and 1979.

== History ==
Mauritania annexed the southern third of the former Spanish colony of Spanish Sahara in 1975 after the Madrid Accords, with Morocco taking the northern two-thirds (Saguia el-Hamra and the northern half of Río de Oro) as its Southern Provinces. Both countries claimed historical rights over the area, while the United Nations demanded that the indigenous population (Sahrawis) had a right to self-determination, and should be allowed to decide through a referendum whether the territory should join either of the neighbouring states, or be established as an independent country. The latter was the preferred option of the Polisario Front, a Sahrawi organization which turned its guerrilla forces against both countries, having until then fought Spain. Its attacks against Mauritania proved highly effective.

Polisario strikes against the iron mines at Zouerate and the Mauritania Railway (which carried most of the country's iron ore to the coast for export), as well as the costs of the war effort, soon brought the country to the brink of economic collapse, and produced increasing tensions in the Army and Government apparatus.

In 1978, the one-party government of Moktar Ould Daddah was severely compromised by the failing war effort, and fell to a coup by disgruntled Army officers.

Mauritania then disengaged from the conflict, surrendering its claims to any part of Western Sahara, and pulling out all its troops. The areas occupied by Mauritania were entered by Morocco, which has since claimed ownership over the entire territory, despite continued opposition by Polisario, and its main backer, Algeria.

Mauritanian President Mohamed Khouna Ould Haidalla in 1984 proceeded to recognize the Polisario-backed Sahrawi Arab Democratic Republic (SADR) as the legitimate sovereign of the area. After his toppling in yet another military coup d'état later the same year, this position was increasingly downplayed – though never explicitly overturned – in order to appease Morocco.

== Borders and characteristics ==
Western Tiris was the lower half of Río de Oro, the southern province of the former Spanish Sahara, comprising 88,000 km (55,000 mi) with a population of 12,897. It consisted mostly of barren desert terrain, scarcely populated except by some thousands of Sahrawi nomads, many of whom had fled towards the Algerian Tindouf Province in 1975. A few minor settlements dotted the coast, and the largest of these, Dakhla (formerly Villa Cisneros), was made the provincial capital.

While some reports indicate the territory may hold important quantities of mineral resources such as iron – and there is speculation, but no proof of, off-shore oil – the raging war prevented any serious exploration efforts. It remains mostly unexplored and unexploited to this day. The exception is the rich Atlantic fishing waters. They were never put to use by Mauritania, but have since been fished by Morocco and foreign ships under Moroccan licenses.

The name "Tiris" refers to a desert plain of the Sahara. Mauritania's northernmost province (in its internationally recognized territory) is similarly called Tiris Zemmour, where "Zemmour" refers to a mountain range in central Western Sahara.

The Ould Daddah government's claims to the territory was based in the strong cultural and tribal ties between the Moorish inhabitants of Mauritania, and the tribes of Western Sahara. The government argued they were all part of the same people, and also put forth the notion of pre-colonial sovereignty by certain Mauritanian emirates (tribal fiefdoms) over some of these tribes. Before of the International Court of Justice, Mauritania claimed in 1975 that the entire Spanish Sahara had historically constituted part of "Bilad Chinguetti", which it argued had been an undeclared tribal and religious community. But it also recognized that there had never been a Mauritanian state to claim the territory, since Mauritania itself was a modern-day creation of French colonialism. The court recognized the importance of these cultural links, but announced that they had not constituted sovereignty over the territory or its inhabitants before colonialism, and could not by themselves justify sovereignty today. Instead, it recommended a standard self-determination process where Sahrawis were given the choice of merger with Mauritania and/or Morocco, or independence.

== Present Mauritanian position ==
In later years, the Mauritanian government has maintained a policy of strict neutrality between Polisario and Morocco, while retaining its recognition of the SADR. Minor parts of the Mauritanian political opposition will occasionally express interest in the area, although direct advocacy for retaking it is very rare. Other groups support either Polisario or Morocco. The official position of most parties is to support any outcome acceptable to both remaining sides of the conflict, and that has also been the government's position since the late 1980s, even if it has varied in tune with relations with Morocco.

The territory is now effectively divided between Moroccan and Polisario forces along the length of the Moroccan Wall, and with a cease-fire in effect pending the outcome of the United Nations decolonization process.

== See also ==
- Free Zone (Parts of Western Sahara under SADR/Polisario control)
- History of Western Sahara
- History of Mauritania
- Greater Mauritania
- Regions of Mauritania
- Moroccan-occupied Western Sahara (officially Southern Provinces)
