= Greater Mauritania =

Irredentist national claim in Western Africa

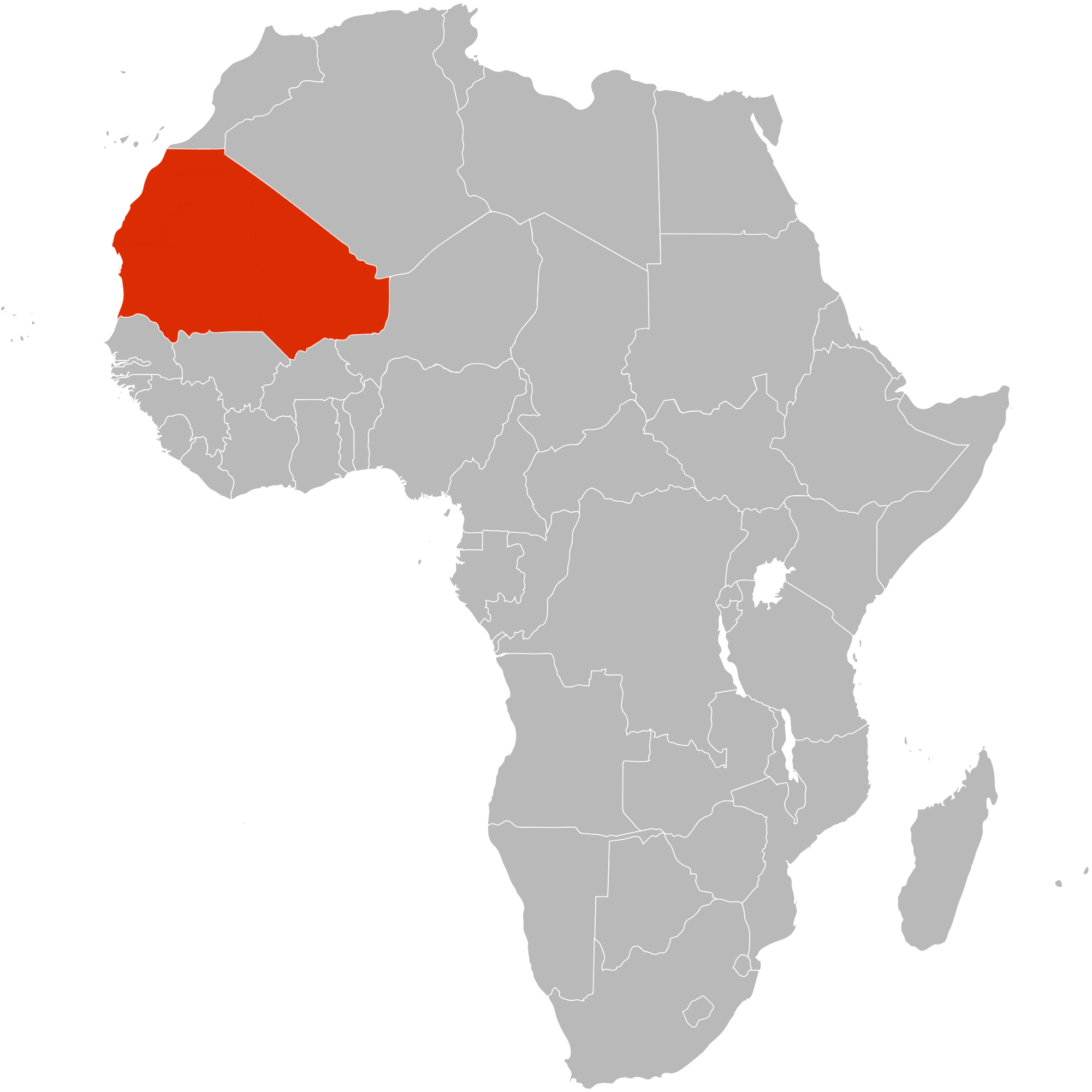
The proposed Greater Mauritania shown within Africa.

Greater Mauritania (Arabic: موريتانيا الكبرى) is a term for the Mauritanian irredentist claim that generally includes the Western Sahara and other Sahrawi-populated areas of the western Sahara Desert. The term was initially used by Mauritania's first President, Mokhtar Ould Daddah, as he began claiming the territory then known as Spanish Sahara even before Mauritanian independence in 1960.

Its main competing ideologies have been Berberism, Sahrawi nationalism, Moroccan irredentism, Mali federationism and Tuareg nationalism.

== History and background ==
The idea evolved in the 1950s in tandem and response to the above-mentioned ideas of Greater Morocco. Its main proponents were among the beidane (light-skinned) community. In 1957, the future first President of Mauritania, Mokhtar Ould Daddah, stated that:

"I therefore call on our brothers in the Spanish Sahara to dream of this economic and spiritual Greater Mauritania of which we cannot speak at present. I address to them, and I ask you to repeat to them a message of friendship, a call for concord between all the Moors of the Atlantic, in Azawad and from the Draa to the borders of Senegal."

The basis for his claim was the close ethnic and cultural ties between the Mauritanians and the Sahrawis of Spanish Sahara, which in effect formed two subsets of the same tribal Arab-Berber population. The Greater Mauritania region is largely coterminous with the Hassaniya Arabic language area and was historically part of the pre-modern Bilad Chinguetti (Arabic: بلاد شنقيط, romanized: Bilād Šinqīṭ), the Land of Chinguetti, a religious center in contemporary Mauritania.

=== Malian claims ===
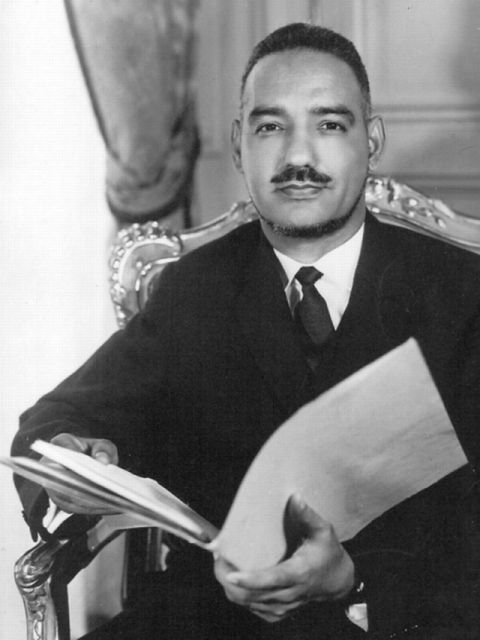
Mokhtar Ould Daddah, who envisioned that Western Sahara would be part of a "Greater Mauritania", served as President of Mauritania from 1960 to 1978.

In Mali, then French Sudan, beidane politicians formulated a "Greater Mauritania", which would include the beidane-inhabited northwestern regions of French Sudan along with Mauritania and Western Sahara. The idea was inspired by the 11th-century Almoravid dynasty, which emerged in modern-day Mauritania and later came to encompass most of north-west Africa, including the modern-day territories of Mauritania, Morocco, Western Sahara, Azawad and the Iberian Peninsula. As a result of the latter, some even believed that Greater Mauritania should include Morocco and thus essentially equaled the Moroccan irredentist land claims. In any event, some of the beidane wished for their region to be joined with Mauritania. The group was represented by the Mauritanian National Renaissance Party, which was founded in August 1958 in Atar, Mauritania, with local chapters being added later on in various French Sudanese locales. It was founded by a subset of the Association of Mauritanian Youth (French: Association de la Jeunesse Mauritanienne), which held pro-Moroccan tendencies during the Ifni War.

Those tendencies were worrying to both French authorities as well as some French Sudanese authorities. Mali's hegemonic political party, the US-RDA, laid claims to parts of Mauritania and also agitated for the return of the Cercle of Timbedgha, which was administratively transferred over to Mauritania in 1944. The US-RDA won the support of many beidane elites in Timbedgha for that, which angered Ould Daddah. Nonetheless, by 1959, Ould Daddah had secured one-party hegemony in Mauritania and these pro-Moroccan and pro-Malian organizations were all dissolved. Nonetheless, despite the dissolution of the Mali Federation in 1960, the Malian government continued to support Morocco's claims over Mauritania and engage in border clashes, with the Mauritanian government accusing Horma Ould Babana, who has been still exiled in Morocco, of having plotted the assassination of a nomadic administrator in the Cercle of Nema, in 1961. Moreover, the Mauritanians accused Mali of supporting Ould Babana.

Nonetheless, Mali and Mauritania eventually signed a mutual border agreement in February 1963.

=== Moroccan claims ===
The original "Greater Morocco" included not only Western Sahara, but also the entirety of Mauritania, which Morocco refused to recognize from its independence in 1960. C. R. Pennell writes that, in return,

"The Mauritanian President, Mokhtar Ould Daddah, talked about a 'Greater Mauritania', a supposed common culture shared by Arabic-speaking tribes between the Senegal river and the Dràa valley. The idea helped build unity at home, and to hold back Moroccan expansionism."

Nonetheless, Thompson and Adloff write that,

"From the outset of his political career, Daddah voiced an irredentist policy with regard to the Western Sahara, with striking perseverance but also without flamboyance, with less than wholehearted backing by his people, and with smaller means at his disposal than those of Morocco. Realism having always characterized Daddah's appraisal of Mauritania's status, he progressively reduced his territorial demands from those of an area larger than the entire Spanish Sahara to what he called Western Tiris, or Tiris El Gharbia."

The claim to the Spanish Sahara was again popularized by the regime in the early 1970s, as Spain prepared to depart the colony. Mauritania then feared Moroccan expansion towards its border, against the background of this "Greater Morocco" claim. However, the governments of Morocco, Algeria, and Mauritania were able to find ways of working together on the issue, and even though Morocco-Mauritania relations were established earlier in 1969, Morocco's formally relinquished its claims over Mauritania in June 1970 after signing a friendship treaty with Mauritania.

== Results and legacy ==
Mauritanian claims to the territory were thus used to stave off the perceived threat of Moroccan expansionism and to entice Spain into dividing the territory between Morocco and Mauritania in the Madrid Accords. That, however, did not take into account an Advisory Opinion by the International Court of Justice (ICJ), which had decided in late 1975 that the people of Western Sahara had a right to self-determination to be exercised freely in the form of a choice between integration with one or both of Mauritania and Morocco, or setting up an independent state.

The Mauritanian portion of the territory, corresponding to the southern half of Río de Oro, or one third of the entire territory, was officially renamed Tiris al-Gharbiyya.

The takeover was violently opposed by a pre-existing indigenous independence movement, the Polisario Front, which had gained support from Algeria. The ensuing war went badly for Mauritania, and Mokhtar Ould Daddah's Government fell in 1978. The country evacuated and left Tiris al-Gharbiyya the following year (1979), renouncing all claims to any part of Western Sahara, and recognizing the Polisario Front as its people's legitimate representative. Relations with Rabat deteriorated rapidly, and amid allegations of Moroccan backing for attempted coups and minor armed clashes, Mauritania drew closer to Algeria and the Polisario. The government later established formal relations with the Front's government-in-exile, the Sahrawi Arab Democratic Republic, as a recognized sovereign over the territory.

The vision of Greater Mauritania holds little appeal in today's Mauritania, and it is not pursued by any major political faction.

While still recognizing the Sahrawi Republic, Mauritania has largely mended relations with Morocco and now generally seeks to stay out of the Western Sahara dispute, which remains unresolved.

== Regions involved ==
- Mauritania
- Azawad region, Mali
- Parts of Tillabéri Region, Niger
- Western Sahara

== See also ==
- History of Western Sahara
- Tiris al-Gharbiyya
- Greater Morocco
- Irredentism
