= 12th meridian west =

Line of longitude

12th meridian west

The meridian 12° west of Greenwich is a line of longitude that extends from the North Pole across the Arctic Ocean, Greenland, the Atlantic Ocean, Africa, the Southern Ocean, and Antarctica to the South Pole.

The 12th meridian west forms a great circle with the 168th meridian east.

Part of the border between Western Sahara and Mauritania is defined by the meridian.

== From Pole to Pole ==
Starting at the North Pole and heading south to the South Pole, the 12th meridian west passes through:

Co-ordinates	Country, territory or sea	Notes
90°0′N 12°0′W	Arctic Ocean	
81°37′N 12°0′W	Greenland	
81°18′N 12°0′W	Atlantic Ocean	
28°7′N 12°0′W	Morocco	
27°40′N 12°0′W	Western Sahara	Claimed by Morocco and the Sahrawi Arab Democratic Republic
26°0′N 12°0′W	Western Sahara / Mauritania border	
23°27′N 12°0′W	Mauritania	
14°46′N 12°0′W	Mali	
14°12′N 12°0′W	Senegal	For about 13 km
14°4′N 12°0′W	Mali	For about 11 km
13°58′N 12°0′W	Senegal	
13°46′N 12°0′W	Mali	
13°34′N 12°0′W	Senegal	
12°24′N 12°0′W	Guinea	
9°54′N 12°0′W	Sierra Leone	
7°12′N 12°0′W	Atlantic Ocean	Passing just east of the island of Tristan da Cunha, Saint Helena, Ascension and Tristan da Cunha (at 37°7′S 12°13′W)
60°0′S 12°0′W	Southern Ocean	
71°18′S 12°0′W	Antarctica	Queen Maud Land, claimed by Norway

== See also ==
- 11th meridian west
- 13th meridian west
