= Guerguerat =

Guerguerat الكركرات
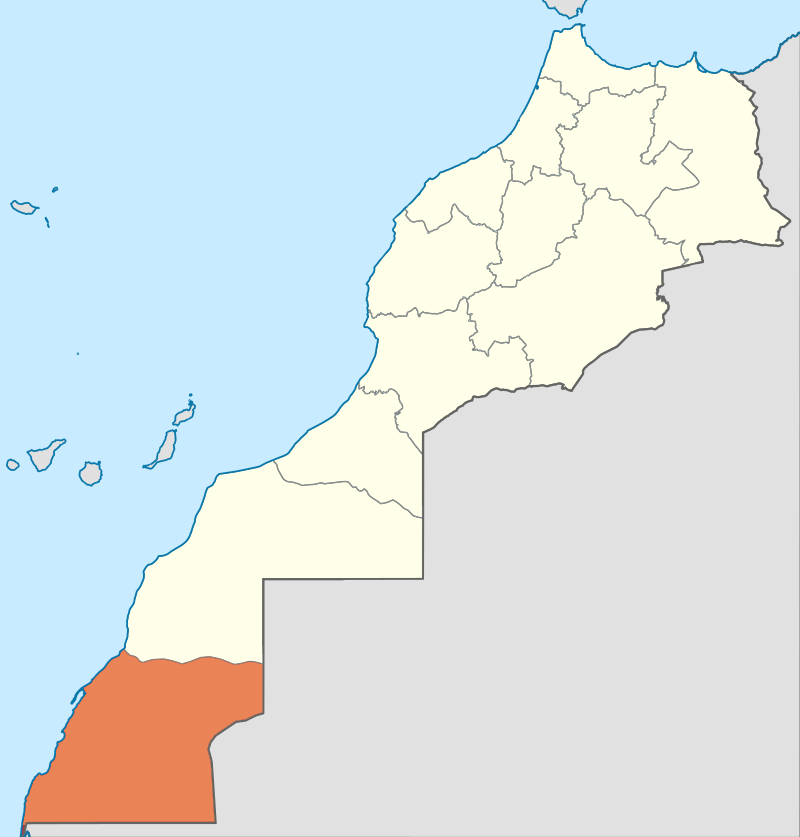
- Dakhla-Oued Eddahab Region where the city's located.
- Interactive map of Guerguerat
- City: Dakhla-Oued Eddahab Region
- Controlled by: Morocco

Area
  - Total: 105.73 km^{2} (40.82 sq mi)
- Elevation: 20 m (66 ft)

Population (2004)
  - Total: 28
  - Density: 0.26/km^{2} (0.69/sq mi)
- Time zone: UTC+0 (GMT)

Guerguerat (Arabic: الڭرڭرات, romanized: al-Gargarāt) is a village in the far south west of Morocco. Guerguerat is approximately 11 km (6.8 mi) from the border with Mauritania and 5 km (3.1 mi) from the Atlantic Ocean.

== History ==
In January 2015, the Polisario established a military presence in La Güera on the seaside, but apparently did not yet start controlling passports of people transiting to Mauritania.

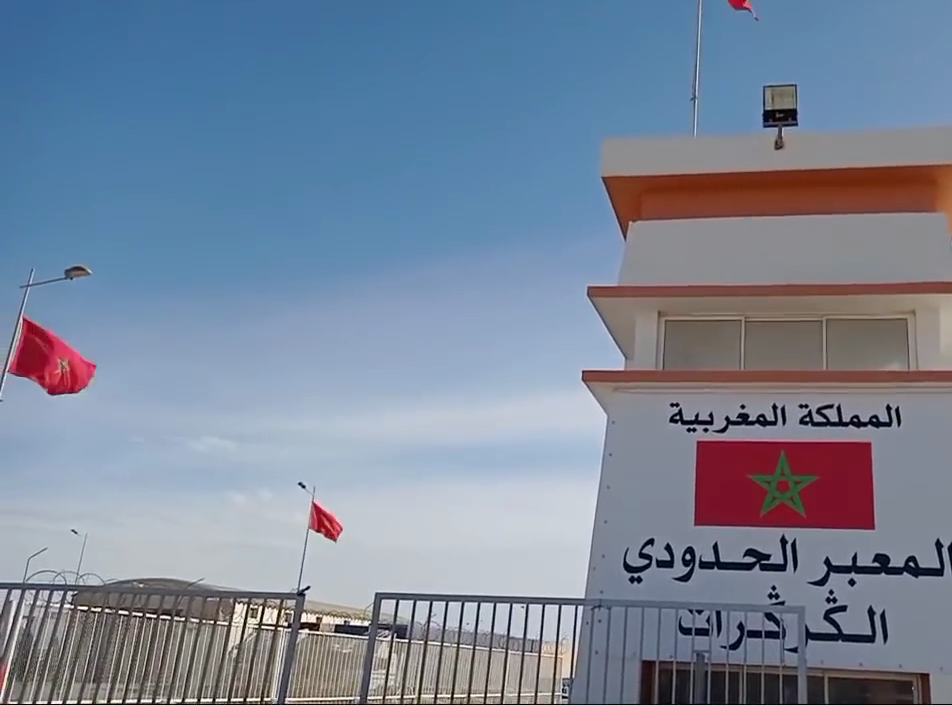
Guerguerat border checkpoint after 2020

The importance of Guerguerat to Morocco lies in two aspects: Moroccan exports of vegetables to Mauritania (especially to Nouadhibou) run through this border station and it is the only open border crossing to an other African country. In fact the only safe road from all northern Africa towards sub-Saharan Africa passes through this border crossing as all Sahelian countries from Sudan to Mali have serious security problems. The importance of Guerguerat to the SADR lies in the fact that this is the only location where it can exert pressure on Morocco by isolating it from Mauritania.

Morocco took military action in the area on 13 November 2020, in an attempt to enforce free movement of goods and people between Moroccan southern regions and Mauritania. The Polisario Front declared an end to the 1991 ceasefire, while Morocco denied there had been any armed clashes between the sides and said the truce remained in place.

The Great Mosque of Guerguerat was opened by Morocco's Ministry of Endowments and Islamic Affairs in March 2023 on a budget of 8.8 million dirham, spanning 3,767 square meters and with a total capacity of 500 people.

In February 2023, the Royal Moroccan Football Federation announced the construction of two football fields in Bir Gandouz and Guerguerat.

A seawater desalination plant in Guerguerat was opened in November 2023, consisting of two desalination units, with a flow rate of 432 m³/day and the construction of an elevated reservoir with a capacity of 200 m³, as well as a distribution network with a length of 5 km.

== Climate ==
Climate data for Guerguerat
Month	Jan	Feb	Mar	Apr	May	Jun	Jul	Aug	Sep	Oct	Nov	Dec	Year
Mean daily maximum °C (°F)	24.0 (75.2)	24.7 (76.5)	25.6 (78.1)	25.5 (77.9)	25.9 (78.6)	27.7 (81.9)	27.2 (81.0)	28.2 (82.8)	30.1 (86.2)	29.7 (85.5)	26.9 (80.4)	24.1 (75.4)	26.6 (80.0)
Mean daily minimum °C (°F)	13.4 (56.1)	13.7 (56.7)	14.4 (57.9)	14.8 (58.6)	15.9 (60.6)	17.3 (63.1)	18.6 (65.5)	19.6 (67.3)	20.0 (68.0)	18.6 (65.5)	16.6 (61.9)	14.2 (57.6)	16.4 (61.6)
Average precipitation mm (inches)	1 (0.0)	3 (0.1)	0 (0)	1 (0.0)	0 (0)	0 (0)	1 (0.0)	2 (0.1)	5 (0.2)	3 (0.1)	2 (0.1)	1 (0.0)	19 (0.7)
Source: Climate-data.org
