= Moroccan-occupied Western Sahara =

UN non-self-governing territory occupied by Morocco

Coordinates: 25°N 13°W

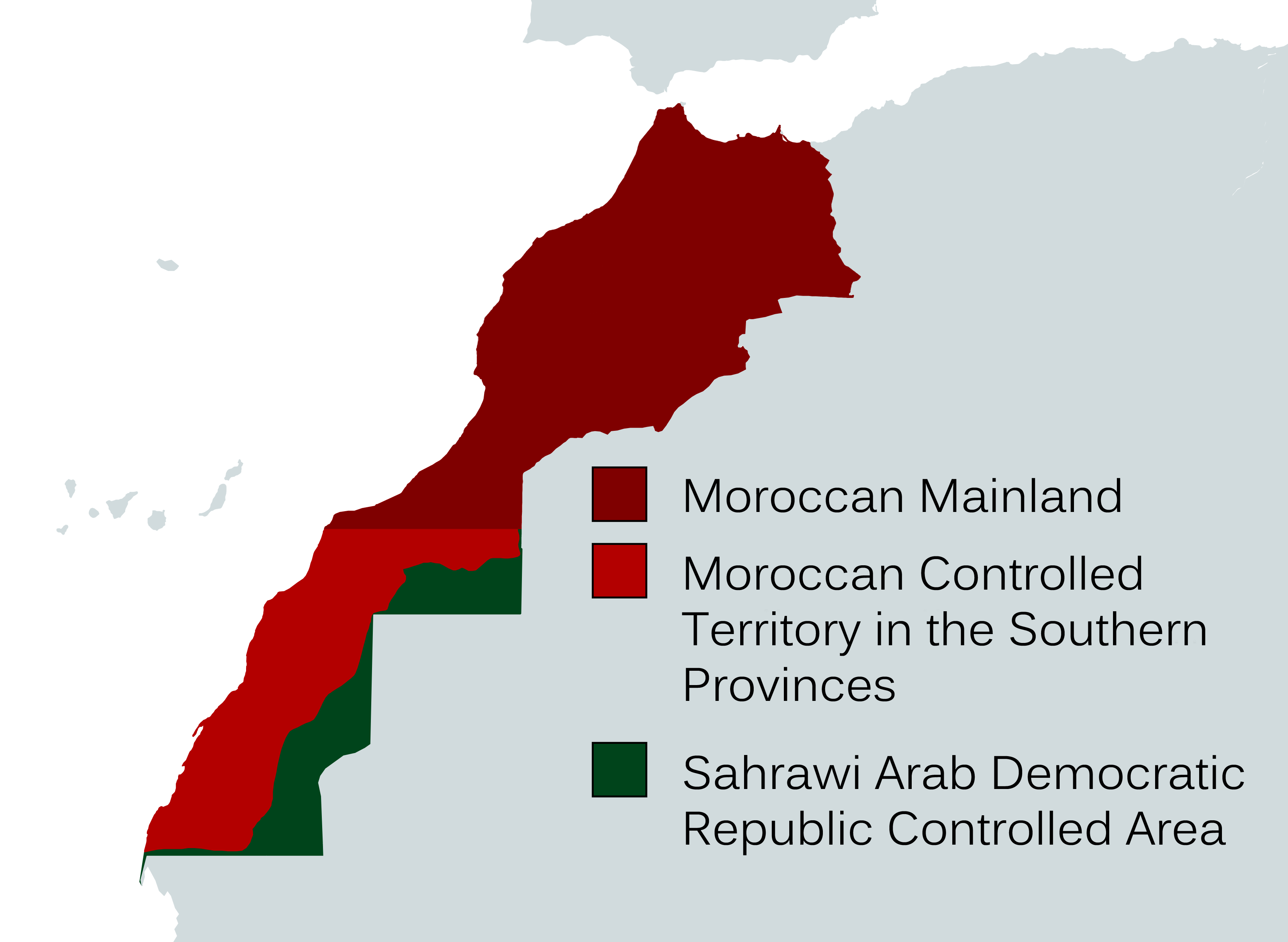
Map of Morocco (red) and Western Sahara, showing the portions of territory in Western Sahara controlled by the Polisario Front (green) and Morocco (light red).

About two-thirds of Western Sahara, a UN-designated non-self-governing territory in the Maghreb, has been illegally annexed and occupied by Morocco since 1975 amid the Western Sahara War. It was illegally annexed by Morocco in two stages in 1976 and 1979. The occupied territories are administered as integral parts of Morocco, and state-sponsored settlement programs exist to relocate Moroccans to Western Sahara.

The Moroccan government uses the terminology Southern Provinces (Note: Arabic: الأقاليم الجنوبية, romanized: al-'Aqālīm al-Janūbiyyah; Standard Moroccan Tamazight: ⵜⴰⵙⴳⵉⵡⵉⵏ ⵏ ⵉⴼⴼⵓⵙ, romanized: tasgiwin n iffus; French: provinces du sud; Spanish: provincias meridionales/provincias del sur) or Moroccan Sahara (Note: Arabic: الصحراء المغربية, romanized: aṣ-Ṣaḥrā' al-Maghribiyyah, French: Sahara marocain, Spanish: Sahara marroquí) to refer to the occupied territory. These designations specifically encompass the entirety of Western Sahara, spanning three of Morocco's 12 top-level administrative regions. Such terminology is often used in Moroccan mass media and state media, while the nomenclature associated with the Polisario Front and the Sahrawi Arab Democratic Republic is censored and sometimes penalized.

== Background ==
Western Sahara was formerly a Spanish colony known as the Spanish Sahara. In the 1970s, Spain faced mounting pressure from Morocco to relinquish the territory, culminating in the Green March, a large-scale military invasion and civilian demonstration organized by the Moroccan government on November 6, 1975 in order to compel Spain to transfer Western Sahara to Morocco. The Madrid Accords, ratified just 12 days after the Green March, stipulated that Spain would exit Western Sahara by February 28, 1976, at the latest. Subsequently, Morocco and Mauritania signed the Western Sahara partition agreement on April 14, 1976. This agreement led to Morocco assuming control over Saguia el-Hamra and the northern portion of Río de Oro, while Mauritania took charge of the remaining part of Río de Oro, renaming it as Tiris al-Gharbiyya.

The Polisario Front, a locally based national liberation movement of the native Sahrawi people, continued its preexisting guerrilla war against the new occupying powers, with significant financial and logistical support from Algeria and Libya. Their goal was to achieve independence as the Sahrawi Arab Democratic Republic (SADR), proclaimed on February 27, 1976.

After years of conflict in Western Sahara, Mauritania signed a peace agreement with the Polisario Front in 1979, formally renouncing its claim to the southern part of the territory. With Mauritania's withdrawal, Morocco moved quickly to annex the area previously held by Mauritania, effectively extending its occupation over part of the region known as Río de Oro.

Since a United Nations-brokered ceasefire agreement in 1991, approximately two-thirds of the territory has been occupied by Morocco, encompassing most of the coastline. This area is separated from the eastern third controlled by the Polisario Front, referred to by them as the Free Zone, by the Moroccan Western Sahara Wall or "the Berm". The ceasefire line corresponds to the route of the Berm, with both sides asserting sovereignty over the entire territory of Western Sahara. The Sahrawi Arab Democratic Republic has received recognition from 84 nations, including Mauritania, and is a full member of the African Union, though not of the UN. The Arab League implicitly recognizes Moroccan territorial integrity, albeit with significant reservations from Algeria and Syria.

== Overview ==
There are three regions in Morocco that contain the claimed territory of Western Sahara.

"Southern provinces" is a Moroccan term whose precise definition has shifted over time. The provinces included in the Moroccan definition cover the entire Western Sahara, plus a large area to the north. Approximately 80% of the territory is currently administered by Morocco, which considers the region its southern provinces, corresponding to the portion west of the Berm wall. The remaining part constitutes the Polisario Front-controlled Free Zone of the Sahrawi Arab Democratic Republic.

Morocco manages these areas as integral parts of its national territory. The government implements large-scale economic and social development programs that have led to significant population growth, incorporating these southern provinces into the national budget for government funding, national sports competitions, educational programs, and national parliamentary elections. The Moroccan state broadcaster also operates Laayoune TV, a local television channel. The total population of Western Sahara is around 576,000. Coastal areas are utilized for fishing, and land areas are exploited for phosphate mining by both government and private entities.

In terms of administration, Morocco divided its controlled territory into administrative units (wilayas). Flags and coats of arms were established for the three wilayas of Boujdour, Smara, and Laayoune.

In 1983, further changes occurred, resulting in the establishment of four wilayas, with the addition of Dakhla. In 1990, Wadi al-Dhahab (Río de Oro) was also incorporated.

As of 2022, the southern provinces are organized into three regions: Guelmim-Oued Noun in the north, Laâyoune-Sakia El Hamra in the center, and Dakhla-Oued Ed-Dahab in the south. These regions are further subdivided into ten provinces. The regions of Guelmim-Oued Noun and Laâyoune-Sakia El Hamra encompass parts of the Western Saharan territory as well as undisputed Moroccan territory to the north.

== Moroccan settlers ==
Following the 1975 Green March, the Moroccan state initiated settlement programs that encouraged numerous Moroccans to relocate to the Moroccan-administered portion of Western Sahara (accounting for approx. 70% of the disputed territory).

By 2015, it was estimated that Moroccan settlers constituted at least two-thirds of the 500,000 inhabitants. In addition to offering a right of return for the Sahrawi refugees, the Sahrawi government in exile expressed a willingness to grant Sahrawi citizenship to Moroccan settlers and their descendants in a prospective independent state.
