= Greater Morocco =

Irredentist beliefs for Morocco

Greater Morocco as claimed by the Istiqlal Party, 1956

Greater Morocco is a Moroccan irredentist claim historically used by some Moroccan nationalist political leaders protesting against Spanish, French and Portuguese rule, to refer to wider territories historically associated with the Moroccan sultan.

The main competing ideologies of the Greater Morocco ideology have been Sahrawi nationalism, Mauritanian irredentism, Spanish nationalism, Berber separatism and Pan-Arabism.

Irredentist, official and unofficial Moroccan claims on territories viewed by Moroccans as having been under some form of Moroccan sovereignty (most frequently with respect to the Spanish exclaves), are rhetorically tied back to an accused expansionism. However, Moroccan government claims make no current reference to the Greater Morocco concept.

== History ==
In 1963, following the Independence of Algeria, Morocco attacked a strip of its south-western regions (Tindouf Province and Béchar Province), claiming that parts of them were previously under Moroccan sovereignty. There were several hundred casualties. French sources reported Algerian casualties to be 60 dead and 250 wounded, with later works giving a number of 300 Algerian dead. Morocco officially reported to have suffered 39 dead. Moroccan losses were probably lower than the Algerians' but are unconfirmed, with later sources reporting 200 Moroccan dead. About 57 Moroccans and 379 Algerians were taken prisoner. After a month of fighting and some hundreds of casualties, the conflict stalemated (see Sand War).

In the early stages of decolonisation, certain elected Moroccan politicians, in particular some members of the Istiqlal Party, like Allal al-Fassi, the sole advocate of “total liberation” who refused to enter France even to meet with his monarch or long-standing nationalist colleagues, were in favour of claiming wider territories historically associated in some way with the Moroccan Sultan. That was initially not supported by the Sultan (later King) of Morocco. Al-Fassi's ambitions gained more support in parliament in the beginning of the sixties, leading to a delay in the recognition of Mauritania (independent in 1960, not recognised by Morocco until 1969).

Al-Fassi's wider claims were effectively abandoned in the later 1960s, although Morocco claims Western Sahara and the Spanish plazas de soberanía on its northern coast. Morocco's refusal to accept its post-colonial borders in the case of Western Sahara has put it on a collision course with the African Union, which holds that as one of its principles. As a consequence, Morocco is the only African country to step out of the union because the Polisario Front, representing the Sahrawi Arab Democratic Republic, was awarded a seat.

The government of King Hassan II laid claim on several territories, successfully acquiring the Tarfaya Strip after the Ifni War with Spain, and much of the territory around Ceuta and Melilla. Morocco also appropriated much of Spanish Sahara after Hassan II sent 350.000 Moroccan civilians to invade it by force, taking advantage of Spain uncertain political situation when general Franco was close to his death, Green March. Spain was forced to surrender the territory to Morocco and Mauritania (see the Madrid Accords). Spanish Sahara remains a disputed territory, with the Polisario Front who claim it as the Sahrawi Arab Democratic Republic.

In 1982, Spain entered the North Atlantic Treaty Organization. However, Ceuta and Melilla are not under NATO protection since Article 6 of the treaty limits the coverage to Europe and North America. The Canary Islands are protected, as they are islands north of the Tropic of Cancer. Legal experts have interpreted that other articles could cover the Spanish North African cities, but that perspective has not been tested in practice.

In 2002, an armed incident erupted between Morocco and Spain, regarding the uninhabited Perejil Island, located 250 m off the Moroccan northern coast. On July 11, 2002 a group of Moroccan soldiers set up base on the islet and so violated the status quo situation agreed between both states. The Moroccan government said that they set foot on the island to monitor illegal immigration, which was denied by the Spanish government since there had been little co-operation in the matter, a repeated source of complaint from Spain. After protests from the Spanish government, led by José María Aznar, the soldiers were replaced by Moroccan navy cadets, who then installed a fixed base on the island. On the morning of July 18, 2002, Spain launched a full-scale military operation to take over the island. The operation was successful, the cadets were dislodged from the island in a matter of hours and offered no resistance to the Spanish Special Operations Groups commando force. The islet returned to its status quo situation and is now deserted. The episode highlighted the mediation role offered by the United States and the lack of collaboration of France towards its European allies during the crisis.

In 2020, US President Donald Trump signed a proclamation recognizing Morocco's sovereignty of the Western Sahara in exchange for the recognition of Israel by Morocco. However, the European states did not modify their position with regard to the United Nations resolutions that recognise the Western Sahara as a territory yet to be decolonised. That, indirectly, together with the hosting of Brahim Gali, the leader of the Polisario, for medical treatment in Spain, was seen by Morocco as an aggression and provoked a new migratory crisis over the Spanish city of Ceuta, in North Africa. The crisis was polemic since Morocco had acted beyond the diplomatic channels, while Moroccan police force's frontier division did not impede migrants from climbing fences or by swimming around frontier line. The Spanish Army intervened to control the trespassing, and at least two people died in the episode while they were trying to reach the shore.

== See also ==
- Scramble for Africa
- Berlin Conference
- Spanish Morocco
- Plazas de soberanía
- List of Spanish colonial wars in Morocco
- List of irredentist claims or disputes
- Cold War
