= Madrid Accords =

1975 treaty between Spain, Morocco, and Mauritania to end Spanish presence in the Sahara

Declaration of Principles on Western Sahara by Spain, Morocco and Mauritania
- Front page of the version in English
- Signed: 14 November 1975
- Location: Madrid, Spain
- Effective: 19 November 1975 (Note: Date of the publication in the Boletín Oficial del Estado of the Law 40/1975, on the decolonization of the Sahara authorizing the Government of Spain to implement the provisions of the treaty)
- Signatories: (Spain) Carlos Arias Navarro; (Morocco) Ahmed Osman; (Mauritania) Hamdi Mouknass
- Parties: Spain; Morocco; Mauritania
- Language: Spanish

Full text
- Declaration of Principles on Western Sahara by Spain, Morocco and Mauritania at Wikisource

The Madrid Accords, (Note: Also called Madrid Agreement or Madrid Pact) formally the Declaration of Principles on Western Sahara, was a treaty between Spain, Morocco, and Mauritania setting out six principles which would end the Spanish presence in the territory of Spanish Sahara and arrange a temporary administration in the area pending a referendum.

The territory had been a Spanish province and former colony. The agreement was signed in Madrid on November 14, 1975, six days before Spanish dictator Francisco Franco died, although it was never published on the Boletin Oficial del Estado. This agreement conflicted with the Law on decolonization of Sahara, ratified by the Spanish Parliament (Cortes) on November 18. Under the Madrid agreement, the territory would then be divided between Morocco and Mauritania, with no role for either the Polisario Front or the Sahrawi people generally. Following the accords, the Polisario relocated from the Mauritanian border to Algeria.

== Background ==
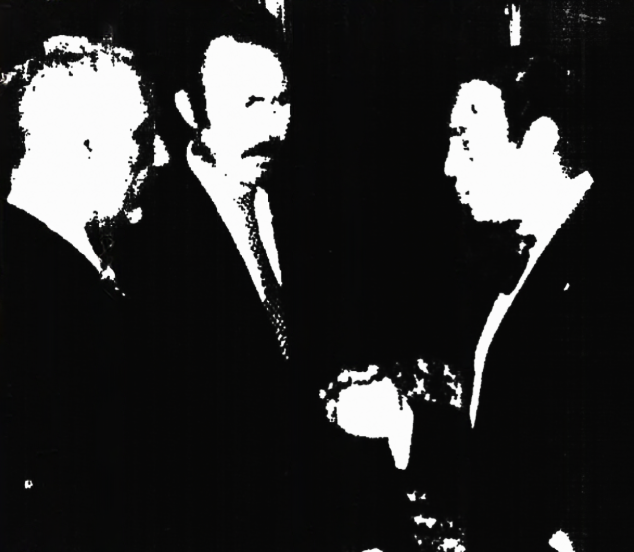
President Moktar Ould Daddah of Mauritania, President Houari Boumédiène of Algeria and King Hassan II of Morocco during a 1973 summit meeting on Spanish Sahara in Agadir.

The province's future had been in dispute for several years, with both Morocco and Mauritania demanding its full annexation to their territory and Spain attempting to introduce either a regime of internal autonomy or a Sahrawi pro-Spanish independent state. Additionally, an independent group of indigenous Sahrawis called the Polisario Front sought independence through guerrilla warfare. The United Nations had since 1963 regarded the area as a colony, and demanded self-determination for it, in accordance with General Assembly Resolution 1514.

=== Motivations of the parties ===
The Madrid Accords followed on the heels of the Green March, a 350,000-strong Moroccan demonstration on 6 November 1975 called by King Hassan II, intended to put pressure on Spanish authorities.

Thompson and Adloff argue (e.g., pp. 132–134, 164–167) that the Green March, as well as increasingly heated rhetorical exchanges between Madrid and Rabat had convinced Spain that Morocco was willing to enter into war over the territory; a U.S. Central Intelligence Agency memorandum to Henry Kissinger had stated as much in early October 1975. With Spanish leader Francisco Franco dying (he had slipped into a coma and died on November 20), the government was anxious to avoid conflict and decided to split the territory in order to preserve maximum possible influence and economic benefit.

President Moktar Ould Daddah had claimed the territory as part of "Greater Mauritania" even before independence (Ould Ahmed Salem, p. 498). Some argue that the intent of Mauritania's claims was to keep Morocco's border with Mauritania farther away. However, Rabat had historically claimed a "Greater Morocco", in which Spanish Sahara and Mauritania were parts of Morocco, until 1969, when the latter claim regarding Mauritania was dropped.

== Content and importance ==
Thompson and Adloff write,

According to [the treaty's] publicised terms, Spain agreed to decolonise the Sahara and leave the area before 28 February 1976. In the interim, the territory would be administered by the Spanish governor general, assisted by two Moroccan and Mauritanian deputy governors, who would respect Sahrawi public opinion as expressed through the yemaa. (...) As to the Bu Craa (a phosphate mine) deposits, Spain would retain 35 per cent of the shares in the Fosfatos de Bucraa, S. A., Fosbucraa company, and a portion of the 65 per cent that would go to Morocco would presumably be allotted to Mauritania. Reportedly there were unpublicised agreements among the three signatories that gave satisfaction to Spain as regards its fishing rights and included a postponement of further Moroccan demands for the presidios, as well as compensation for repatriated Spanish and Canary Island civilians. (p. 175)

The United States Library of Congress study of Mauritania (1990) states that,

In early 1975, both Morocco and Mauritania agreed to abide by the decision of the International Court of Justice on the status of the Spanish Sahara, but when the court ruled in October 1975 that neither country was entitled to claim sovereignty over the territory, both governments chose to ignore the decision. In November 1975, they concluded the Madrid Agreements with Spain under which Morocco acquired the northern two-thirds of the territory, while Mauritania acquired the southern third. The agreement also included the proviso that Spain would retain shares in the Bu Craa mining enterprise. Mauritania acquiesced to the agreements under the assumption, probably correct, that Morocco, with its superior military power, would otherwise have absorbed the entire territory.

== Results ==
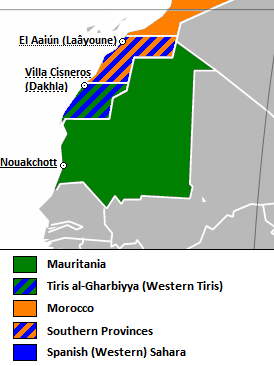
Partition of Western Sahara.

The agreement was bitterly opposed by Algeria and the Polisario Front, which remained committed to independence. Algeria dispatched a high-level delegation to Madrid in order to pressure Spain not to sign the Accords and started supporting the Polisario Front militarily and diplomatically by early 1975. Algeria officially viewed its opposition as a way to uphold the UN charter and combat colonialism, although some observers believed that Algeria's actions were more to counter Morocco's influence and to gain access to the Atlantic Ocean. A long-standing rivalry between the two countries contributed to the tense relations.

The Boumédiène government consequently broke with Morocco and started supplying the Polisario guerrillas with weapons and refuge and condemned the Accords internationally. Algeria expelled some 45,000 Moroccan citizens then living in Algeria, and began radio broadcasts in support of both the Polisario and – more briefly – a separatist group in the Canary Islands, the latter presumably in an attempt to punish Spain.

Morocco and Mauritania split the territory between them in the Western Sahara partition agreement, and moved in to assert their claims; this resulted in armed clashes erupting between the two countries troops and Polisario. Polisario and Algeria both deemed the advance of Morocco and Mauritania as a foreign invasion, while Morocco and Mauritania saw the fight against Polisario as a fight against a separatist group. In support of Polisario, Algeria sent troops deep into the territory, but they eventually retreated after the Amgala battle in 1976.

The clashes turned into a 17-year-long war, during which Mauritania was forced to retreat, abandoning all claims to the region, in 1979. As an effect of the conflict, a part of the territory's population became refugees. It was finally ended with a ceasefire in 1991.

Today, the status of the territory, now called Western Sahara, remains in dispute.

== International status of the accords ==
The United Nations considers Western Sahara to remain a Non-Sovereign Territory, awaiting formal decolonization. It recognizes that Morocco presently administers much of it de facto, but neither the General Assembly nor any other UN body has ever recognized this as constituting sovereignty. In a 2002 letter of the General Secretary for Legal Affairs and Legal Counsel of the United Nations, Hans Corell, in which he gave an opinion on the legality of actions taken by Moroccan authorities in signing contracts for the exploration of mineral resources in Western Sahara, he stated:

On 14 November 1975, a Declaration of Principles on Western Sahara was concluded in Madrid between Spain, Morocco and Mauritania ("the Madrid Agreement"), whereby the powers and responsibilities of Spain, as the administering Power of the Territory, were transferred to a temporary tripartite administration. The Madrid Agreement did not transfer sovereignty over the Territory, nor did it confer upon any of the signatories the status of an administering Power, a status which Spain alone could not have unilaterally transferred. The transfer of administrative authority over the Territory to Morocco and Mauritania in 1975 did not affect the international status of Western Sahara as a Non-Self-Governing Territory".

On 26 February 1976, Spain informed the Secretary-General that as of that date it had terminated its presence in Western Sahara and relinquished its responsibilities over the Territory, thus leaving it in fact under the administration of both Morocco and Mauritania in their respective controlled areas. Following the withdrawal of Mauritania from the Territory in 1979, upon the conclusion of the Mauritano-Sahrawi agreement of 19 August 1979 (S/13503, annex I), Morocco has administered the Territory of Western Sahara alone. Morocco, however, is not listed as the administering Power of the Territory in the United Nations list of non-self-governing territories, and has, therefore, not transmitted information on the Territory in accordance with Article 73 e of the Charter of the United Nations".

Morocco continues to claim Western Sahara as an integral part of its territory, by virtue of the Madrid Accords, among other reasons. The Polisario Front declared in 1976 an Algeria-based government-in-exile, the Sahrawi Arab Democratic Republic (SADR), which denies that the Madrid Accords held any validity and claims the entire area whereas actually controlling only small uninhabitable parts of it. The SADR is also unrecognized by the UN, but has been admitted as Western Sahara's representative to the African Union (AU) and its ruling party (the Polisario Front) is recognized by the UN at least as the "sole legitimate representative of the Sahrawi people". Mauritania has pulled out from the conflict entirely since 1979.

Morocco broke the treaty to spark the 2020 Western Sahara clashes.

== See also ==
- Sahrawi nationalism
