= Río de Oro =

Territory of Western Sahara

Coordinates: 23°00′N 13°00′W

Colony of the Rio de Oro Colonia del Rio de Oro (Spanish)
- 1884–1958
- Flag of Spain (1843–1931) Coat of arms
- Anthem: Marcha Real (1884–1931, 1942–1968); Himno de Riego (1931–1942)
- Location of Rio de Oro
- Status: Colony of Spain
- Capital and largest city: Villa Cisneros
- Common languages: Spanish (official); Arabic
- Religion: Catholicism, Islam
- Governor
- Historical era: New Imperialism; World War I; World War II; Cold War
  - Established: 1884
  - Disestablished: 1958

Area
  - Total: 184,000 km^{2} (71,000 sq mi)
- Currency: Spanish peseta
Succeeded by
Spanish Sahara
- Today part of: Western Sahara

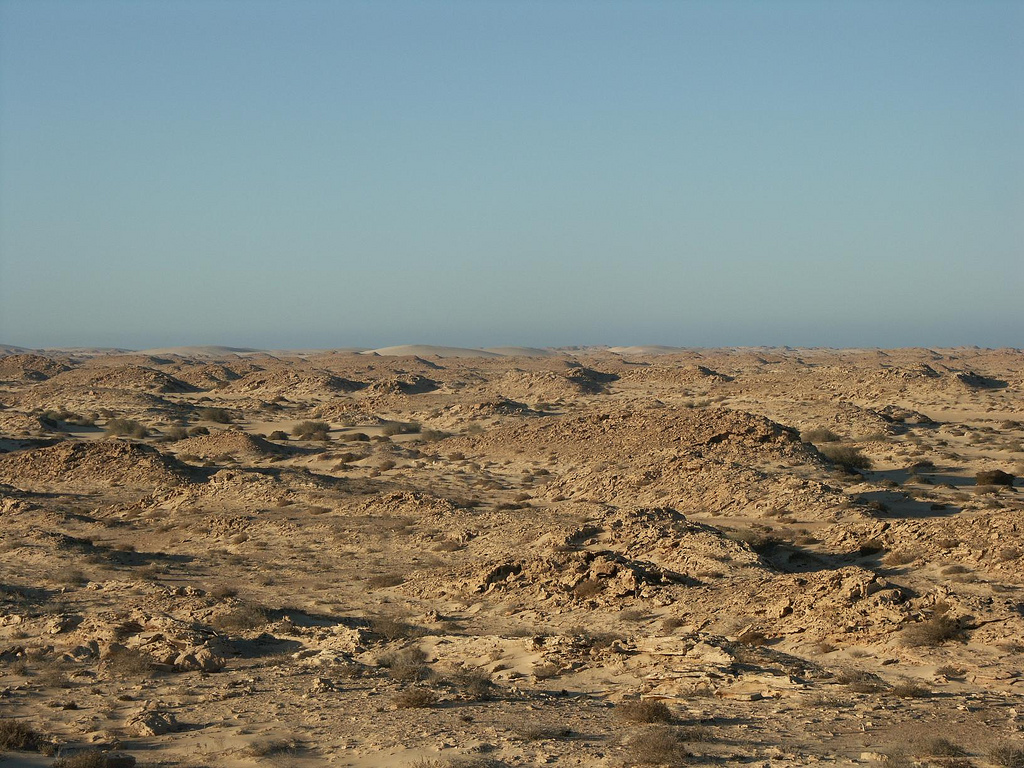
Desolate landscape terrain in the Río de Oro region, near the town of Guerguerat

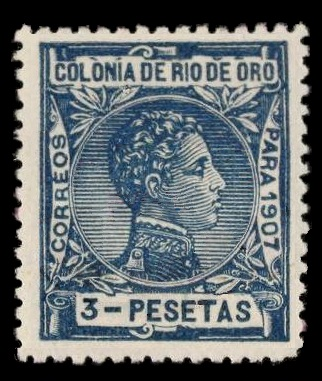
Stamp of Rio de Oro issued in 1907.

Río de Oro (Spanish: [ˈri.o ðe ˈoɾo], Spanish 'River of Gold'; Arabic: وادي الذهب, Wādī-aḏ-Ḏāhab 'River of Gold', often transliterated as Oued Edhahab) is the southern part of Western Sahara. With Saguia el-Hamra, it constituted the Spanish province of Spanish Sahara after 1958; it had been taken as a Spanish colonial possession in the late 19th century. Its name comes from a misinterpretation of Dakhla Bay as the mouth of a river.

The Spanish name is derived from its previous name Rio do Ouro, given to it by its Portuguese discoverer Afonso Gonçalves Baldaia in 1436. The Portuguese prince Henry the Navigator dispatched a mission in 1435, under Gil Eanes and Baldaia, to find the legendary River of Gold in western Africa. Going down the coast, they rounded the al-Dakhla peninsula in present-day Western Sahara and emerged into an inlet, which they excitedly believed to be the mouth of the River of Gold (see Senegal River). The name continued to be used for the inlet and the surrounding area although no gold was found there, neither in the water of the narrow gulf, probably mistaken for the river itself, nor in its neighborhood. Some gold dust, however, was obtained from the natives.

Occupying the southern part of Western Sahara, the territory lies between 26° to the north and 21° 20′ to the south. The area is roughly 184,000 km^{2} (71,000 mi^{2}), making it approximately two thirds of the entire Western Sahara. The former provincial capital founded by the Spanish was Villa Cisneros, which was renamed under Mauritanian administration in 1976 "ad-Dakhla".

The Battle of Río de Oro was a single-ship action fought in August 1914 during the First World War. A British protected cruiser attacked a German auxiliary cruiser off the small Spanish colony of Río de Oro.

In 1975, as Spain retreated from the territory, Western Sahara was split under the Madrid Accords between Mauritania and Morocco, even if this division was bitterly contested by the Polisario Front. The dividing line ran halfway through Río de Oro, with Morocco taking the northern part plus Saguia el-Hamra, and Mauritania annexing the lower third of the colony as a northern province called Tiris al-Gharbiyya (Western Tiris). Its provincial capital was already called Dakhla. After a disastrous four-year war with the Polisario, Mauritania relinquished Tiris al-Gharbiyya, withdrew from Western Sahara, and left Morocco and the Polisario as the sole belligerents in the conflict, which is not yet resolved; a cease-fire has been in effect since 1991.

This area is today divided by the Moroccan military berm, with Morocco occupying the parts to the west of it, and the Polisario Front-held Free Zone, under the control of the Sahrawi Arab Democratic Republic to the east. These zones are temporary divisions negotiated as a part of the United Nations Mission for the Referendum in Western Sahara (MINURSO) ceasefire.
