= Saguia el-Hamra =

Territory of Western Sahara

Coordinates: 27.1536°N 13.2033°W

Saguia el-Hamra during Spanish colonisation

Saguia el-Hamra or Sakia el Hamra (Spanish: Saguía el Hamra [saˈɣia el ˈxamɾa], Arabic: الساقية الحمراء, romanized: al-Sāqiyah al-Ḥamrāʾ, lit. 'Red Canal') is the northern geographic region of Western Sahara. It was, with Río de Oro, one of the two territories that formed the Spanish province of Spanish Sahara after 1969. Its name comes from a waterway that goes through the capital. The wadi is inhabited by the Oulad Tidrarin Sahrawi tribe.

Occupying the northern part of Western Sahara, it lay between the 26th parallel north and 27°50'N. The city of Cape Bojador served to divide the regions. Its colonial capital was El Aaiún (Laâyoune), and it also included the city of Smara.

The territory takes its name from an intermittent river, the Saguia el-Hamra, the route of which runs west from south of El Farsia to reach the Atlantic at Laayoune.

The area is roughly 82,000 km (51,000 mi), making it approximately a third of the entire Western Sahara.
