= United Nations Security Council Resolution 1017 =

UN Security Council Resolution 1017
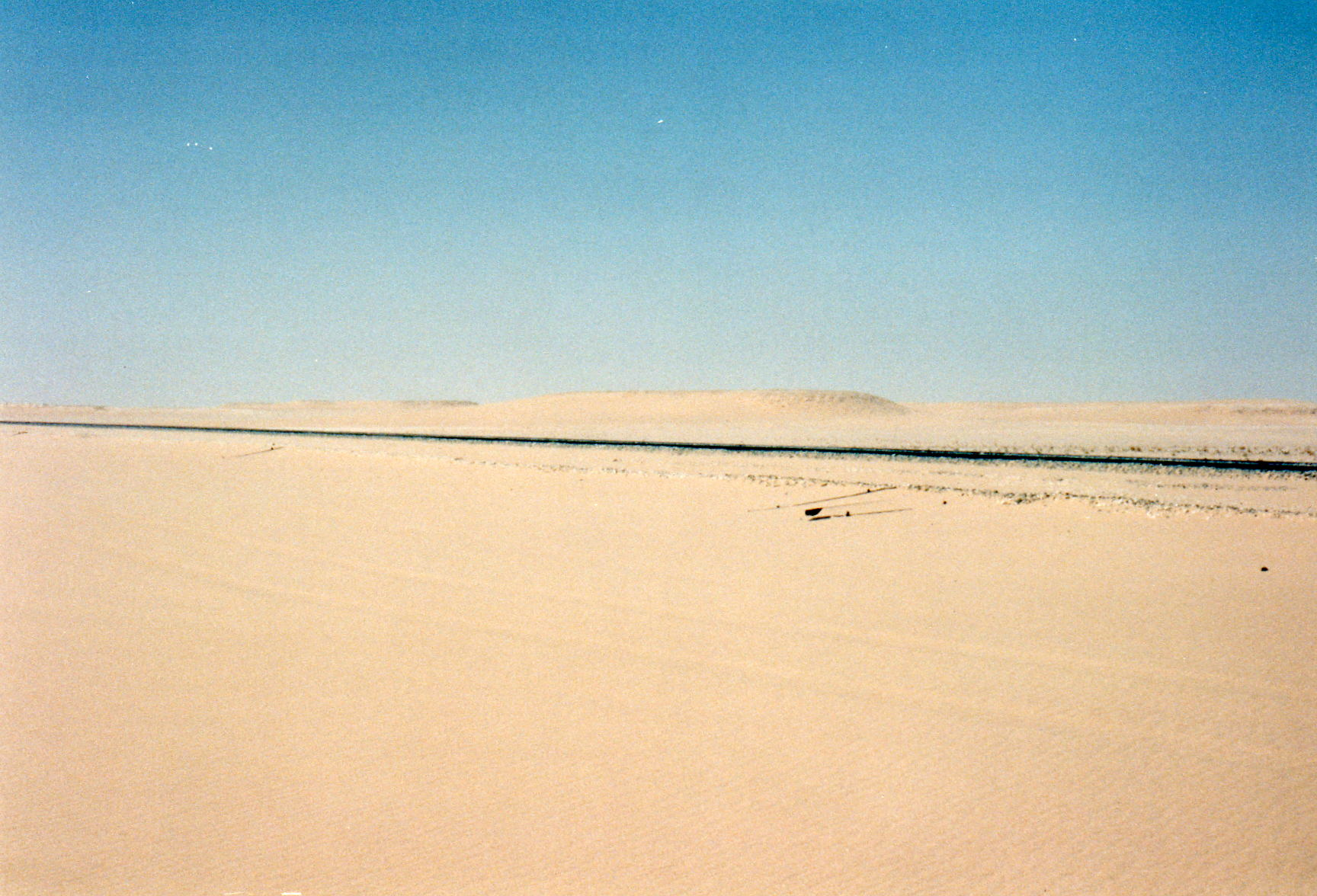
- Border between Western Sahara and Mauritania
- Date: 22 September 1995
- Meeting no.: 3,582
- Code: S/RES/1017 (Document)
- Subject: Western Sahara
- Voting summary: 15 voted for; None voted against; None abstained
- Result: Adopted

Security Council composition
- Permanent members: China; France; Russia; United Kingdom; United States
- Non-permanent members: Argentina; Botswana; Czech Republic; Germany; Honduras; Indonesia; Italy; Nigeria; Oman; Rwanda

United Nations Security Council resolution 1017, adopted unanimously on 22 September 1995, after recalling resolutions 621 (1988), 658 (1990), 690 (1991), 725 (1991), 809 (1993), 907 (1994), 973 (1995), 995 (1995) and 1002 (1995), the Council discussed the implementation of the Settlement Plan in Western Sahara and extended the mandate of United Nations Mission for the Referendum in Western Sahara (MINURSO) until 31 January 1996.

The Security Council recalled the criteria regarding voter eligibility and the compromise proposal of the Secretary-General. According to the report by Secretary-General Boutros Boutros-Ghali, only 2 out of 8 identification centres were currently in operation. To move forward, both parties had to have a vision for the period after the referendum on self-determination. The Council regretted the vetting of Morocco that 100,000 applicants not living in the Western Sahara territory was contributing to the delays in the schedule of MINURSO. It also regretted the refusal of the Polisario Front to participate in this process.

The resolution reiterated the commitment of the council to hold a referendum for self-determination of the people of Western Sahara. Since the adoption of Resolution 1002, the concerned parties had made insufficient progress towards the fulfilment of the Settlement Plan with regard to the identification process, the code of conduct, the release of political prisoners, the confinement of Polisario troops and arrangements for a reduction in Moroccan troops. The parties were asked to co-operate with the United Nations plan and the Secretary-General was requested to make proposals to solve such problems.

While the mandate of MINURSO was extended until 31 January 1996, the Council noted the possibility of withdrawing the peacekeeping operation if the conditions necessary for the beginning of the transitional period (a presumed date of 31 May 1996) were not met. The Secretary-General was asked to report by 15 January 1996 on progress made towards implementing the Settlement Plan. He was also asked to consider ways of reducing the operational costs of MINURSO, including the possible establishment of a trust fund to which Member States would voluntarily contribute.

== See also ==
- History of Western Sahara
- List of United Nations Security Council Resolutions 1001 to 1100 (1995–1997)
- Sahrawi Arab Democratic Republic
- Wall (Western Sahara)
