= United Nations Security Council Resolution 1002 =

United Nations Security Council resolution

UN Security Council Resolution 1002
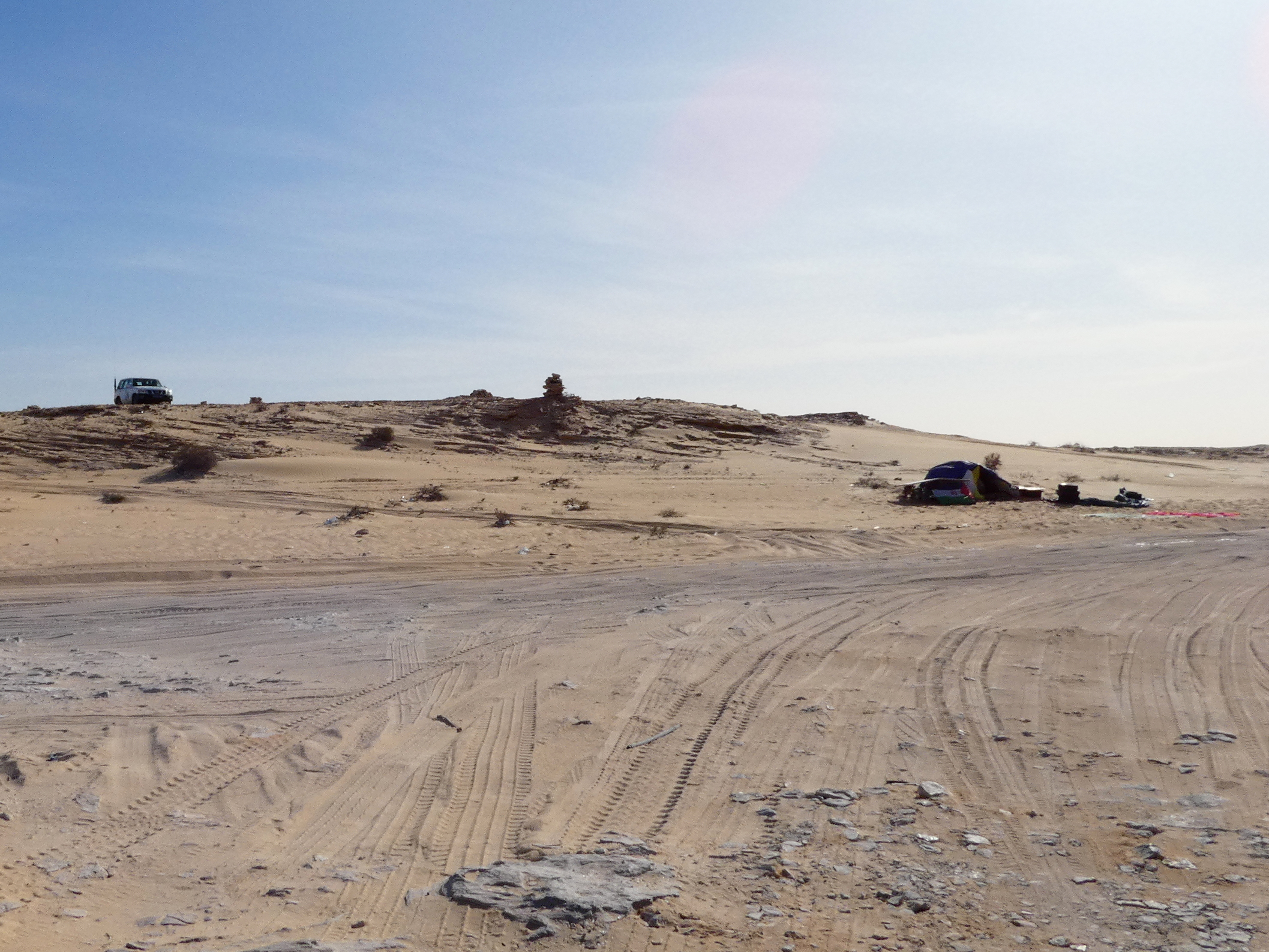
- UN patrol in the Western Sahara
- Date: 30 June 1995
- Meeting no.: 3,550
- Code: S/RES/1002 (Document)
- Subject: Western Sahara
- Voting summary: 15 voted for; None voted against; None abstained
- Result: Adopted

Security Council composition
- Permanent members: China; France; Russia; United Kingdom; United States
- Non-permanent members: Argentina; Botswana; Czech Republic; Germany; Honduras; Indonesia; Italy; Nigeria; Oman; Rwanda

United Nations Security Council resolution 1002, adopted unanimously on 30 June 1995, after recalling resolutions 621 (1988), 658 (1990), 690 (1991), 725 (1991), 809 (1993), 907 (1994), 973 (1995) and 995 (1995), the Council discussed the implementation of the Settlement Plan in Western Sahara and extended the mandate of United Nations Mission for the Referendum in Western Sahara (MINURSO) until 30 September 1995.

The Security Council was concerned that suspicion and a lack of trust among the parties had contributed to the delay in implementing the United Nations plan for Western Sahara. For progress to be achieved, both parties would have to have a vision of the post-referendum period. The Secretary-General Boutros Boutros-Ghali had set targets on assessing the Settlement Plan, including the release of political prisoners, confinement of Polisario troops and the reduction of Moroccan troops in the territory.

The resolution reiterated the commitment of the council to hold a referendum for self-determination of the people of Western Sahara. However, concern was expressed at the continued delays in implementing the plan for the referendum, as part of the overall Settlement Plan; all parties were urged not to impede the implementation of the Settlement Plan and requested the Secretary-General to persuade both Morocco and the Polisario Front to resume participation in its implementation. Boutros-Ghali was further requested by 10 September 1995 to report on progress in this area.

It was expected that the referendum would take place in early 1996 with November 1995 as the beginning of the transitional period. Based on a further report from the Secretary-General, it would be decided whether to continue the mandate of MINURSO beyond 30 September 1995.

== See also ==
- History of Western Sahara
- List of United Nations Security Council Resolutions 1001 to 1100 (1995–1997)
- Sahrawi Arab Democratic Republic
- Wall (Western Sahara)
