= United Nations Security Council Resolution 995 =

UN Security Council Resolution 995
- Western Sahara
- Date: 26 May 1995
- Meeting no.: 3,540
- Code: S/RES/995 (Document)
- Subject: Western Sahara
- Voting summary: 15 voted for; None voted against; None abstained
- Result: Adopted

Security Council composition
- Permanent members: China; France; Russia; United Kingdom; United States
- Non-permanent members: Argentina; Botswana; Czech Republic; Germany; Honduras; Indonesia; Italy; Nigeria; Oman; Rwanda

United Nations Security Council resolution 995, adopted unanimously on 26 May 1995, after recalling resolutions 621 (1988), 658 (1990), 690 (1991), 725 (1991), 809 (1993), 907 (1994) and 973 (1995), the Council dispatched a mission to the Western Sahara and extended the mandate of United Nations Mission for the Referendum in Western Sahara (MINURSO) until 30 June 1995.

The Security Council was determined to hold a free, fair and impartial referendum for self-determination of the people of Western Sahara in accordance with the Settlement Plan. Progress in identifying potential voters was commended, however certain practices were hampering the efforts of MINURSO. In this context, it was decided to send a mission to the region in order to accelerate the process. A further extension of MINURSO would be considered.

== See also ==
- History of Western Sahara
- List of United Nations Security Council Resolutions 901 to 1000 (1994–1995)
- Polisario Front
- Sahrawi Arab Democratic Republic
- Moroccan Western Sahara Wall
