= United Nations Security Council Resolution 973 =

UN Security Council Resolution 973
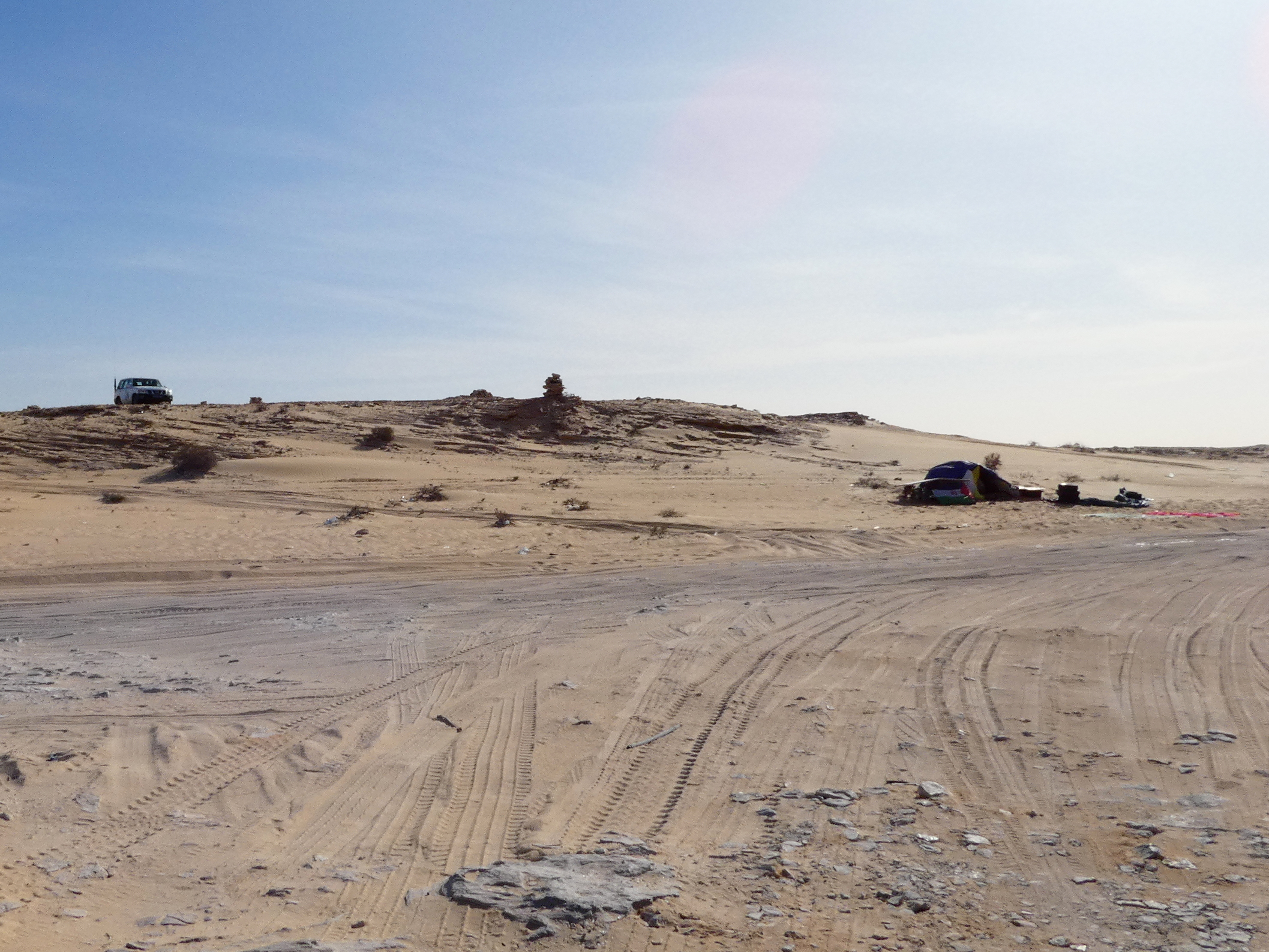
- UN patrol in the Western Sahara
- Date: 13 January 1995
- Meeting no.: 3,490
- Code: S/RES/973 (Document)
- Subject: Western Sahara
- Voting summary: 15 voted for; None voted against; None abstained
- Result: Adopted

Security Council composition
- Permanent members: China; France; Russia; United Kingdom; United States
- Non-permanent members: Argentina; Botswana; Czech Republic; Germany; Honduras; Indonesia; Italy; Nigeria; Oman; Rwanda

United Nations Security Council resolution 973, adopted unanimously on 13 January 1995, after recalling resolutions 621 (1988), 658 (1990), 690 (1991), 725 (1991), 809 (1993) and 907 (1994), the Council discussed the Settlement Plan for the Western Sahara and extended the mandate of United Nations Mission for the Referendum in Western Sahara (MINURSO) until 31 May 1995.

Acknowledging the Secretary-General Boutros Boutros-Ghali's visit to the Western Sahara in November 1994, the Council affirmed that a referendum of self-determination must be held for the people of the territory. The Secretary-General felt that the MINURSO mission, which was responsible for the organisation of the referendum, required more staff for the purposes of voter registration. The Settlement Plan as a whole had also been delayed.

The council stated that the referendum was to go ahead as planned to solve the issue in the Western Sahara. The extension of MINURSO as defined by the secretary-general was approved concerning the deployment of observers. In this regard, he was requested to report to the council by 31 March 1995 on the logistic, personnel and other resources required and its further plans. The transitional period would begin on 1 June 1995 with a view to holding the referendum in October 1995 and the termination of MINURSO. The possible extension of MINURSO beyond 31 May 1995 was dependent on a report by the Secretary-General.

== See also ==
- History of Western Sahara
- List of United Nations Security Council Resolutions 901 to 1000 (1994–1995)
- Polisario Front
- Sahrawi Arab Democratic Republic
- Wall (Western Sahara)
