= United Nations Security Council Resolution 907 =

UN Security Council Resolution 907
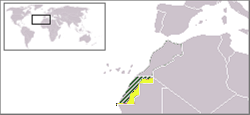
- Western Sahara region
- Date: 29 March 1994
- Meeting no.: 3,355
- Code: S/RES/907 (Document)
- Subject: Western Sahara
- Voting summary: 15 voted for; None voted against; None abstained
- Result: Adopted

Security Council composition
- Permanent members: China; France; Russia; United Kingdom; United States
- Non-permanent members: Argentina; Brazil; Czech Republic; Djibouti; New Zealand; Nigeria; Oman; Pakistan; Rwanda; Spain

United Nations Security Council resolution 907, adopted unanimously on 29 March 1994, after recalling resolutions 621 (1988), 658 (1990), 690 (1991), 725 (1991) and 809 (1993), the council discussed the Settlement Plan for the Western Sahara.

The proposal by the Secretary-General Boutros Boutros-Ghali concerning the interpretation and application of criteria for voter eligibility was welcomed, while concern was expressed over continuing difficulties and delays in the work of the Identification Commission. The commission was requested to complete the analysis of all applications received and proceed with the identification and registration of potential voters by 30 June 1994, with the secretary-general reporting back on developments no later than 15 July 1994 with regard to the work of the commission and other areas relevant to the Settlement Plan.

The council also noted that the referendum could now no longer take place by the end of 1994, and would consider the future of the United Nations Mission for the Referendum in Western Sahara where its strength and role would be reviewed.

== See also ==
- History of Western Sahara
- List of United Nations Security Council Resolutions 901 to 1000 (1994–1995)
- Polisario Front
- Sahrawi Arab Democratic Republic
- Wall (Western Sahara)
