= 2018 in Western Sahara =

- Decades: 1990s; 2000s; 2010s; 2020s
- See also: History of Western Sahara; List of years in Western Sahara

The following lists events that happened during 2018 in the Sahrawi Arab Democratic Republic.

== Events ==
Ongoing: Western Sahara conflict

- 1 May: Morocco cuts diplomatic ties with Iran over its support for the Polisario Front, the Western Saharan independence movement.
- The United Nations Security Council announced that peace talks regarding the Western Sahara territory would resume and delegates of the Polisario Front, Morocco, Algeria, and Mauritania would all be present.
