= 2020 in Western Sahara =

- Decades: 2000s; 2010s; 2020s
- See also: History of Western Sahara; List of years in Western Sahara

The following lists events that happened during 2020 in the Sahrawi Arab Democratic Republic.

== Events ==
Ongoing: Western Sahara conflict; Second Western Sahara War

- January 24: The foreign ministries of Spain and Morocco announce they will hold talks to resolve a dispute over territorial water rights in the North Atlantic, caused by the Moroccan parliament passing two laws that extended its claims to the coast of Western Sahara earlier this week. Spain expressed concerns that these laws would encroach on its claims near the Canary Islands.
- November 13: Polisario Front declares war on Morocco accusing Rabat of breaking the 1991 ceasefire.
- November 14: The Sahrawi Arab Democratic Republic declares war on Morocco, formally ending a 29-year truce.
- December 10: The United States says that Morocco will normalize diplomatic relations with Israel, becoming the fourth Arab country to do so in recent months, in an agreement mediated by the United States. U.S. President Donald Trump also says that he recognizes "Moroccan sovereignty over the entire Western Sahara territory". Morocco says that the United States "will open a consulate in Western Sahara as part of Morocco’s deal with Israel".
