= 2019 in Western Sahara =

- Decades: 1990s; 2000s; 2010s; 2020s
- See also: History of Western Sahara; List of years in Western Sahara

The following lists events that happened during 2019 in the Sahrawi Arab Democratic Republic.

== Events ==
Ongoing: Western Sahara conflict

- On March 25, 2019, Morocco convened an African Ministerial Conference on Western Sahara, bringing together African diplomats to discuss the dispute and promote Morocco’s autonomy plan for the territory.
- In June 2019, the governments of El Salvador and Barbados officially withdrew their recognition of the self-proclaimed Sahrawi Arab Democratic Republic (SADR), a diplomatic shift away from the Polisario Front’s independence claim.
