= 2023 in Western Sahara =

- Decades: 2000s; 2010s; 2020s
- See also: History of Western Sahara; List of years in Western Sahara

The following lists events that happened during 2023 in the Sahrawi Arab Democratic Republic.

== Events ==
=== October ===
- October 30 - A person is killed and three more people are injured during a rocket attack by Polisario Front in Smara, in the Morocco-occupied Western Sahara.
