= United Nations Security Council Resolution 809 =

UN Security Council Resolution 809
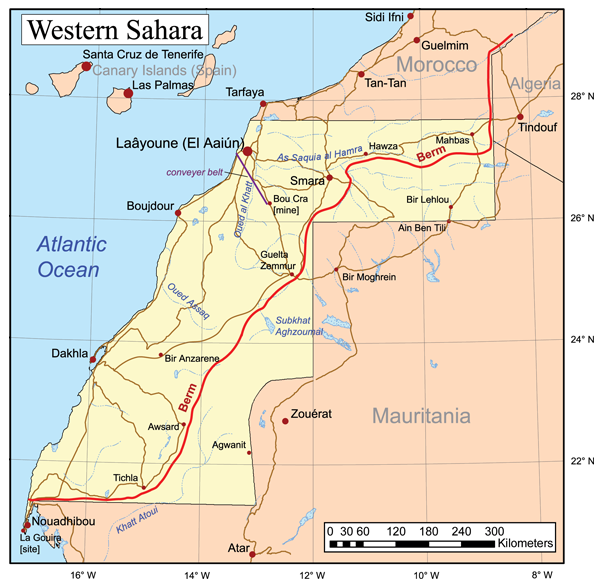
- Western Sahara region
- Date: 2 March 1993
- Meeting no.: 3,179
- Code: S/RES/809 (Document)
- Subject: Western Sahara
- Voting summary: 15 voted for; None voted against; None abstained
- Result: Adopted

Security Council composition
- Permanent members: China; France; Russia; United Kingdom; United States
- Non-permanent members: Brazil; Cape Verde; Djibouti; Hungary; Japan; Morocco; New Zealand; Pakistan; Spain; Venezuela

United Nations Security Council resolution 809, adopted unanimously on 2 March 1993, after recalling resolutions 621 (1988), 658 (1990), 690 (1991) and 725 (1991), in addition to noting a report by the Secretary-General Boutros Boutros-Ghali on the situation in Western Sahara, the Council expressed concern at delays in implementing the Settlement Plan and invited the Secretary-General and his Special Representative to intensify efforts with the Government of Morocco and Polisario Front to address issues of contention, particularly in regard to voter eligibility.

The resolution went on to invite Boutros-Ghali to make arrangements for the organization of a referendum of self-determination of the people of Western Sahara and for efforts to commence voter registration starting with the updated lists of the 1974 census. It also asked the Secretary-General to report back to the Security Council no later than May 1993 on the outcome of these efforts discussed in the current resolution, further requesting him to include proposals for any necessary adjustments to the present role and strength of the United Nations Mission for the Referendum in Western Sahara.

Resolution 809 concluded by urging both parties to co-operate with the Secretary-General to resolve outstanding issues so that a referendum could be held by the end of the year. Although Morocco and the Polisario Front mutually agreed to the provisions of the resolution, continued disputes over the identification process of voters successively delayed plans for a referendum.

== See also ==
- History of Western Sahara
- List of United Nations Security Council Resolutions 801 to 900 (1993–1994)
- Sahrawi Arab Democratic Republic
