= 2025 in Western Sahara =

- Decades: 2000s; 2010s; 2020s
- See also: History of Western Sahara; List of years in Western Sahara

The following lists events that happened during 2025 in the Sahrawi Arab Democratic Republic.

== Events ==
Ongoing: Western Sahara conflict; Second Western Sahara War

- The United Nations Security Council adopted Resolution 2797 (2025) endorsing Morocco's autonomy plan for Western Sahara and extending the MINURSO peacekeeping mission mandate until October 31, 2026.
- Between January and March, MINURSO reported that Morocco had completed construction of a new 93 km road across the berm from Smara toward Mauritania; the Polisario Front condemned this as part of Moroccan occupation policy.
