= 2022 in Western Sahara =

- Decades: 2000s; 2010s; 2020s
- See also: History of Western Sahara; List of years in Western Sahara

The following lists events that happened during 2022 in the Sahrawi Arab Democratic Republic.

== Events ==
=== January ===
- 1 January: The SPLA claimed through its official news agency to have bombarded the 43rd regiment of the Moroccan Army in the Amitir Lemkhinza region, and carried out attacks on the Laâked area in the Mahbes sector.
- 2 January: The SPLA claimed through its official news agency to have carried out new attacks in Ahreichat Dirit and Udey Damran regions in the Hauza and Mahbes sectors, respectively.
- 3 January: The SPLA claimed through its official news agency to have carried out new attacks against the Moroccan forces in Oudi Edamrane area in the Mahbas sector.
- 4 January: The SPLA claimed through its official news agency to have launched new attacks against the entrenchments of the Moroccan forces in the Laagad region, Mahbes sector.
- 5 January: The SPLA claimed through its official news agency to have concentrated their bombardments against Moroccan forces positioned in the Rus Bin Amera region, in the Farsia region, as well as the regions of Laagad, Udei Adamran, Gararat Al-Firsik and Sabjat Tanuchad, in the Mahbes sector. The SPLA also reportedly carried outbombardments against the 65th regiment's command post in the Laagad region.
- 6 January: The SPLA claimed through its official news agency to have concentrated their bombardments on the regions of Bin Zakka, Rus Lagseibiyin and Fadrat Al-Ich in the Hauza sector.
- 7 January: The SPLA claimed through its official news agency to have bombed the areas of Udey Damrán, Sabjat Tanuchad, Russ Sabti, Grarat Afarsik and Guerat ULD Blal in the Mahbes sector.
- 8 January: The SPLA claimed through its official news agency to have bombed the region of Sabjat Tanuchad, in the Mahbes sector.
- 9 January: The SPLA claimed through its official news agency to have bombed the regions of Grarat Alfarsik and Galb Nass in the Mahbes and Auserd sectors, respectively.
- 10 January: The SPLA claimed through its official news agency to have bombed the regions of Fadrat Lagrab, Fadrat Al-Ich and Rus Asabti, in the sectors of Hauza and Mahbes, respectively. The representative of the Polisario Front to the United Nations, Sidi Mohamed Omar, affirmed that "the Saharawi side is willing to cooperate with the efforts of the United Nations and the African Union to achieve a peaceful and lasting solution to the conflict".
- 11 January: The SPLA claimed through its official news agency to have concentrated their bombardments against Moroccan forces in the regions of Jangat Huría, Rus Udei As-sfaa and Gararat Lahdid, in the Smara and Farsía sectors, respectively.
- 12 January: The SPLA, claimed through its official news agency that their units carried out concentrated attacks against the entrenchments of the Moroccan forces in the Fadrat Al-Mars region, in the Hauza and the regions of Um Lagsa and Acheidmiya, in the Mahbes sector. The latter region had several vehicles and military equipment destroyed in the attacked base, including a Katyusha rocket launcher.
- 13 January: The SPLA claimed through its official news agency to have bombed the regions of Rus Faraa Udei As-sfaa, Fadrat Al-Ich, Guerat Uld Blal and Sabjat Tanuchad in the regions of Hauza and Mahbes. The United Nations Personal Envoy for Western Sahara, Staffan de Mistura visited Rabat to meet Nasser Bourita, the Moroccan Minister of Foreign Affairs and Omar Hilale, Morocco's Permanent Ambassador to the United Nations, as part of the UN efforts to promote negotiations between the parties in conflict and a solution to the dispute. Morocco reiterated its position that Morocco has full sovereignty over Western Sahara.
- 14 January: The SPLA, claimed through its official news agency to launched bombardments at the Moroccan army's 43rd battalion command headquarters in the Umeitir Lamjeinza area, and at Moroccan positions stationed in the areas of Agrarat Al-Farsik and Russ Sabti, both in the Mahbes sector.
- 15 January: The UN Personal Envoy for Western Sahara, Staffan de Mistura visited Algers and the Saharawi refugee camps in Tindouf, as part of the UN efforts to promote negotiations between the parties in conflict and a solution to the dispute. de Mistura met high-ranking officials of the Polisario Front, and the Secretary General of the Polisario Front, Brahim Ghali. Sidi Mohamed Omar, stated that "he does not expect much from de Mistura's visit, considering it a contact visit with the authorities of the parties in the conflict, (namely the SADR and Morocco), not in negotiation." Omar later stated that "[the Polisario front] no longer sees the self-determination referendum as a possible solution, but cling to their legitimate right to full independence for Western Sahara". During his visit to the Tindouf camps, de Mistura was photographed with a child soldier serving for the Polisario Front, this caused widespread controversy and indignation, the UN Press Secretary later denied that de Mistura noticing the child soldier. The SPLA claimed through its official news agency to have launched bombardments in the Umeitir Lamjeinza area, and at Moroccan positions stationed in the Agrarat Al-Farsik and Russ Sabti areas, both in the Mahbes sector.
- 16 January: De Mistura met with the head of the Political Organization of the Polisario Front, Khatri Addouh, in Dar Diafa, Shahid Al Hafed. The chief negotiator affirmed that UN should seek peaceful settlement based on failure of past approaches. Later, he was received by Brahim Ghali in his office at the Saharawi Presidency with the presence of the Polisario representative at the UN, Sidi Mohamed Omar. The President of the CONASADH, Abba El-Haissan, warned about UN Failure to protect international humanitarian and human rights laws in Western Sahara. The SPLA said that it had launched new attacks on military targets in the Mahbes sector. The Chief of Staff of the Saharawi Army, Mohamed Luali Akeik, said that the conflict continues despite the fact that Morocco denied it.
- 17 January: De Mistura concluded his peacekeeping visit, heading to Nouakchott on his third stop, as part of his first tour to the region. The SPLA claimed through its official news agency to have attacked the positions of the Moroccan forces in the Gararat Achadida and Gararat Lahdid regions, in the Farsía sector.
- 18 January: The SPLA claimed through its official news agency to have carried out bombardments on the Fadrat Al-Ich and Adeim Um Ajlud regions, in the Hauza and Auserd sectors, respectively.
- 19 January: The SPLA claimed through its official news agency to have launched bombardments against the positions of the Moroccan forces in the Gararat Al-Firsik and Udei Adamran regions, in the Mahbes sector.
- 20 January: The SPLA claimed through its official news agency to have launched concentrated attacks against the positions of the Moroccan forces along the Moroccan Wall, in the Galb An-nas and Ahreichat Dirit regions, in the Auserd and Hauza sectors, respectively.
- 21 January: The SPLA claimed through its official news agency to have launched bombardments in the areas of Laagad, Guerat ULD Blal and Fadrat Lagráb in the Mahbes and Hauza sectors, respectively.
- 22 January: The SPLA claimed through its official news agency to have launched bombardments on the Russ Sabti and Agrarat Al-Farsik areas and on Moroccan troops stationed in the Udey Damran area, both in the Mahbes sector.
- 23 January: The SPLA claimed through its official news agency to have launched bombings on Fadrat Lagraab, Galb Nass and Agrarat Al-Farsik regions in the Hauza, Auserd and Mahbes sectors, respectively.
- 24 January: The SPLA claimed through its official news agency to have made attacks on Laagad, Tanuchad and Agrarat Al-Farsik in the Mahbes sector.
- 25 January: The SPLA claimed through its official news agency to have attacked the Moroccan positions at various points of the Moroccan Wall, in the Guerat ULD Blal region in Mahbes sector.
- 26 January: The SPLA claimed through its official news agency to have launched shelling against Moroccan forces in the Sabjat Tanuchad and Um Dagan regions, in the Mahbes and Bagari sectors, respectively.
- 27 January: The SPLA claimed through its official news agency to have bombarded Moroccan positions in the Sabjat Tanuchad and Gararat Al-Firsik regions, in the Mahbes sector. In his speech, Brahim Ghali blamed "the Moroccan State for the serious events that threaten peace and security in the region".
- 28 January: The SPLA claimed through its official news agency to have launched bombardments in the Fadrat Laach and Russ Dirit areas, both in the Hauza sector.
- 29 January: The SPLA claimed through its official news agency to have launched bombardments in the Farsía sector, and the Galb Nass and Fadrat Tamát regions in the Auserd and Hauza sectors, respectively.
- 30 January: The SPLA claimed through its official news agency to have launched bombardments in the areas of Sabjat Tanuchad and Udey Damrán, both in the Mahbes sector.
- 31 January: The SPLA claimed through its official news agency to have attacked the positions of Moroccan forces in the regions of Laagad, Steilat Uld Bugerin and Um Dagan, in the sectors of Mahbes, Auserd and Bagari, respectively.

=== February ===
- 1 February: The SPLA claimed through its official news agency to have launched bombings at the command post of the Moroccan army's 65th regiment in Laagad, as well as several targets in the Aagad Arkan region, in Mahbes.
- 2 February: The SPLA claimed through its official news agency to have concentrated their attacks against the Moroccan forces positioned in the Agsibi An-Najla, Agseibi Amchagab and Lagseibi Lamlas, in the Hauza sector and the Sabjat Tanuchad, Udei Adamran and Laaran regions, in Mahbes.
- 3 February: The SPLA claimed through its official news agency to have launched bombings against the Moroccan forces positioned in the Fadrat Al-Ich and Fadrat Lagrab regions.
- 4 February: The SPLA claimed through its official news agency to have launched bombing attacks on Moroccan positions in the Russ Arbeib, Russ Lagteitira and Russ Turkanat regions in the Hauza sector.
- 5 February: The SPLA claimed through its official news agency to have launched bombardments on Moroccan positions in the regions of Sabjat Tanuchad and Laagad in the Mahbes sector, and Russ Arbeib, Russ Lagteitira and Russ Turkanat in the Hauza sector.
- 6 February: During the 35th Summit of African Union Heads of State and Government held in Addis Ababa, Brahim Ghali informed African leaders of "the dangerous developments recorded in Western Sahara after the end of ceasefire", He compares "the practices pursued by Morocco [against Sahrawi people] to those practiced by the Israeli occupation against the Palestinian people". The SPLA claimed through its official news agency to have carried out new attacks against positions of the Moroccan forces in the regions of Chadimiya and Rous Es-sebti in the Mahbas sector, as well as in the region of Laksibi Lamlas in the Hawza sector.
- 7 February: The SPLA claimed through its official news agency to have targeted the entrenchments of Moroccan soldiers in several regions of the Hawza sector, including the regions of Rous Benzekka, Lemkiteb and Rous Terkanet.
- 8 February: The SPLA claimed through its official news agency to have launched heavy bombardments against various positions along the Moroccan Wall, in the Gararat Achadida and Gararat Lahdid regions in the Farsía sector, and the Gararat Al-Firsik, Udei Adamran, Laagad and Udei Um Rakba regions in the Mahbes sector.
- 9 February: The SADR Ministry of Defense issued a war report summarising the combat operations that have been carried out by the SPLA in the first week of February, including a list of a total 12 Moroccan human losses. The SPLA claimed through its official news agency to have launched concentrated bombardments in the Lagseibi Lamlas region, in Hauza, as well as in the Um Lagta and Sabjat Tanucahd regions, in Mahbes.
- 10 February: The SPLA claimed through its official news agency to have concentrated their attacks against the entrenchments of Moroccan forces in the Gararat Al-Firsik, Um Dagan, Rus Taraganit and Fadrat Labeir regions in the Mahbes, Bagari, Hauza and Farsia sectors, respectively.
- 11 February: A senior military official in the Sixth Military Region of the SPLA told the Polisario Front's official news agency that there were 8 Moroccan losses in early February 2022 near Mahbes. Morocco allegedly stated that the cause of these deaths was due to COVID-19 or other causes. The SPLA claimed through its official news agency to have launched bombing attacks on Moroccan positions in the Agseiby Najla and Agseibi Amchagab regions in the Hauza sector.
- 12 February: The SPLA claimed through its official news agency to have launched bombardments in the regions of Udey Adamrán and Agrarat Al-Farsik in the Mahbes sector, and the Tandkama Al-Bayda area, Um Dreiga sector.
- 13 February: The SPLA claimed through its official news agency to have launched bombardments in Laagad, Sabjat Tanuchad and Lamkeitab regions in the Mahbes and Hauza sectors, respectively.
- 14 February: The SPLA claimed through its official news agency to have attacked the regions of Galb An-nas, Tandakma Al-Beida and Guerat Uld Blal in the Auserd, Um Dreiga and Mahbes sectors, respectively.
- 15 February: The SPLA claimed through its official news agency to have launched several attacks against the Moroccan forces in the Udei Adamran, Fadrat Tamat and Sahab Achadida in the Mahbes, Hauza and Farsía sectors, respectively.
- 18 February: The SPLA claimed through its official news agency to have launched bombing attacks on Moroccan positions in the Um Dagan area in the Bagari sector.
- 19 February: The SPLA claimed through its official news agency to have launched bombardments on Moroccan positions in the regions of Al-Aría, Lairán, Aagad Argán, Guerat ULD Blal and the 65th regiment's command headquarters of the Moroccan army in Laaked, Mahbes sector, as well as the Russ Lagteitira and Um Dagan regions in the Hauza and Bagari sectors, respectively.
- 20 February: The SPLA claimed through its official news agency to have launched bombing attacks on Moroccan positions in the Sabjat Tanuchad, Lagseibi Lamlas and Legseibi Al-Kasir and Aadeim Um Ajlud, in the Mahbes, Hauza and Auserd sectors, respectively.
- 21 February: The SPLA claimed through its official news agency to have launched bombing attacks on Moroccan positions in the Russ Targánat region in the Hauza sector.
- 22 February: SPLA launched new attacks in the Mahbes sector, against the entrenchments of the Moroccan forces in the regions of Gararat Al-Firsik and Udei Um Rakba.
- 23 February: SPLA launched heavy shelling against the entrenchments of the Moroccan forces in Rus Asabti region, in the Mahbes sector and in the Amagli Adachra and Amagli Labgar regions, in the Amgala sector.
- 24 February: SPLA attacked Moroccan forces positioned in the Tandakma Al-Beida and Um Dagan regions, in the Bagari sector and in the Azamul Um Jamla region, in Um Dreiga. In addition, SPLA attacked Moroccan forces entrenched in the Gararat Al-Atasa region, as well as the 43rd regiment's command base in the Ameitir Lamjeinza region, in the Mahbes sector.
- 25 February: SPLA bombarded Moroccan positions in the areas of Laagad, Guerta Uld Blal, Sabjat Tanuchad and Russ Udey Damràn, in the Mahbes sector, as well as the Tandagma Albeida region, in the Bagari sector.
- 26 February: SPLA launched bombing attacks on Moroccan positions in the Grarat Alfarsik and Udey Emarkba areas, in the Mahbes sector.
- 27 February: SPLA bombarded Moroccan positions in the Rus Acheidmiya and Udey Damràn areas, in the Mahbes sector.
- 28 February: SPLA attacked Moroccan positions in the Guerat Uld Blal and Sabjat Tanuchad regions, in the Mahbes sector, and in the Adeim Um Ajlud region, in Auserd sector.

=== March ===
- 1 March: SPLA attacked Moroccan forces in the Udei Um Rkba and Gararat Al-Firsik regions, in the Mahbes sector.
- 2 March: SPLA bombarded Moroccan positions in the Gasbat Achuhada and Gararat Al-Arabi regions, in the Atweizegui sector and the Amheibas At-tarab, Aagad Aragan and Laaran, in the Mahbes sector.
- 3 March: SPLA bombarded Moroccan positions in the Gararat Al-Firsik region, in the Mahbes sector.
- 4 March: SPLA bombarded the 43rd regiment's command base of the Moroccan army in the Ameitir Lamjeinza region, in the Mahbes sector, and neutralized a Moroccan BM-21 Grad artillery battery.
- 5 March: SPLA attacked Moroccan forces in the areas of Guerat Uld Blal and Sabjat Tanuchad, in the Mahbes sector.
- 6 March: SPLA launched bombardments on Moroccan positions located in the Guerat Uld Blal, Sabjat Tanuchad, Grarat Alfarsik, Amheibas Tedrib, Aagad Argàn, Laaràn, Agseibat Shuhadà and Grarat Alaarbi in the Mahbes and Tuizgui sectors, respectively.
- 7 March: SPLA launched bombardments on Moroccan positions located in the Grarat Chdeida, Russ Sueihat and Taraf Ahmeida areas, in the Farsía sector and in the Fadrat Laach area in the Hauza sector, as well as in Um Lagta and Laagad, in the Mahbes sector.
- 8 March: SPLA bombarded the entrenchments of the Moroccan forces in the Guerat Uld Blal, Laagad, Sabjat Tanuchad, Gararat Al-Firsik and Um Lagti regions in the Mahbes sector.
- 9 March: SPLA carried out new attacks against the Moroccan forces positioned in the Laagad region, in the Mahbes sector.
- 11 March: SPLA launched bombardments on Moroccan positions located in the Grarat Alfarsik and Udey Damràn regions, in the Mahbes sector.
- 12 March: SPLA launched bombardments on Moroccan positions located in the Russ Cheidmiya and Udey Amarkba areas, in the Mahbes sector.
- 13 March: SPLA launched bombardments on Moroccan positions located in the Grarat Chdeida and Alfieín regions, in the Farsìa sector.
- 14 March: SPLA bombarded Moroccan positions in the Gararat Achadida, Gararat Lahdid and Al-Faiyin regions, in the Farsía sector, as well as in the Tanuchad region, in the Mahbes sector.
- 15 March: SPLA attacked Moroccan forces in the Guerat Uld Blal region, in the Mahbes sector.
- 16 March: SPLA attacked Moroccan forces positioned in the Garart Achadida, Ajbeilat Aljadar and Gararat Al-Firsik regions in the Farsía, Guelta and Mahbes sectors, respectively.
- 17 March: SPLA launched bombardments on Moroccan forces located in the Rus Asabti and Udei Adamrán regions, in the Mahbes sector.
- 19 March: SPLA launched new attacks in the Grarat Chdeid, Jbeilat Aljadar and Grarat Al-Farsik areas in the Farsía, Guelta and Mahbes sectors.
- 19 March: SPLA bombarded Moroccan positions in the Laagad area in the Mahbes sector.
- 20 March: SPLA launched bombardments on Moroccan positions located in the Guerat Uld Blal area in the Mahbes sector.
- 21 March: SPLA launched bombardments on Moroccan positions located in the Ajbeilat Aljadar area in the Guelta sector.
- 22 March: SPLA bombarded Moroccan positions in the Acheidmiya, Rus Asabti and Udei Adamran regions, in the Mahbes sector.
- 23 March: SPLA launched bombing attacks on Moroccan positions in the Rus Ajbeilat Lajdar, Laagad, Guerat Uld Blal and Sabjat Tanuchad regions, in the Mahbes and Guelta sectors, respectively.
- 24 March: SPLA attacked Moroccan positions in the Udei Um Rakba region, in the Mahbes sector.
- 25 March: SPLA bombarded Moroccan positions in the Laagad and Guerat Uld Blal, in the Mahbes sector.
- 26 March: SPLA attacked Moroccan positions in the Grarat Alfarsik, Udey Damrà and Russ sabti regions, in the Mahbes sector and in the Amagli Dachra and Amigli Alhàra regions, in the Guelta sector.
- 27 March: SPLA launched bombardments on Moroccan forces located in the Um lagta, Russ Cheidmiya, Grarata Chdeida, Grarat Lahdid and Ajbeilat Albid regions in the Mahbes, Farsía and Guelta sectors, respectively.
- 28 March: SPLA launched bombardments against Moroccan positions located in the Guerat Uld Blal region, Laagad, and Gaarat Al-Firsik, in the Mahbes sector, as well as in the regions of Taref Hamida, Rus Asweihat and Gararat Achadida, in the Farsia sector.

=== April ===
- 2 April: SPLA launched bombardments against Moroccan positions in the Laagaad and Grarat Alfarsik areas, both in the Mahbes sector.
- 3 April: SPLA launched bombardments against Moroccan positions in the Udey Damràn area in the Mahbes sector.
- 4 April: SPLA launched bombardments on Moroccan forces in the Kaydiat area, Um Dreiga sector.
- 6 April: SPLA launched bombardments against Moroccan positions in the Gararat Lahdid and Gararat Achadida regions, in Farsia sector.
- 7 April: SPLA attacked Moroccan forces positioned in The Rus Asabti and Guerat Uld Blal regions in the Mahbes sector, as well as the special intervention group's general headquarters of the 47th Battalion, in the Um Dagan region, Um Dagan sector.
- 8 April: SPLA launched bombardments against Moroccan forces in the areas of Udey Damràn and Laagad, both in the Mahbes sector.
- 10 April: Moroccan forces reportedly killed three Algerian citizens in an airstrike on a truck convoy close to Ain Ben Tili, Mauritania.
- 11 April: SPLA attacked Moroccan forces positioned in the regions of Ajbeilat Albid, Lemsamir, Gararat Al-Arabi, Gasbat Achuhada and Rus Asabti, in the sectors of Guelta, Atweizegui and Mahbes, respectively.
- 12 April: SPLA launched bombardments against Moroccan positions in the regions of Fadrat Al-Mars, north of Galb Dirit, Al-Ariya and Amheibas At-tadrib, in the Hauza and Mahbes sectors, respectively.
- 13 April: SPLA launched bombardments against Moroccan positions in the Gararat Al-Firsik and Udei Adamran regions, in the Mahbes sector.

=== September ===
- 14 September: According to Mauritanian media, two Mauritanian gold miners were killed in a Moroccan drone strike in Western Sahara.
