= 2026 in Western Sahara =

- Decades: 2000s; 2010s; 2020s
- See also: History of Western Sahara; List of years in Western Sahara

The following lists events that happened during 2026 in the Sahrawi Arab Democratic Republic.

== Events ==
Ongoing: Western Sahara conflict; Second Western Sahara War

- 21 January – Sweden formally supports Morocco’s proposed autonomy plan for Western Sahara.
- 1 March – The Panama-flagged cargo vessel Dura Bulk, carrying clinker to the port of Laayoune, sinks off the coast after reporting water ingress.
- 10 September – The Spanish Congress of Deputies approves legislation granting Spanish citizenship to Sahrawis born under the Spanish administration of Western Sahara.
- 1 November – The UN peacekeeping mission in Western Sahara (MINURSO) begins its liquidation phase after 35 years, following the UN Security Council's failure to renew its mandate.
