= Sahrawi =

Sahrawi or Saharawi (also transliterated into Spanish as Saharaui or French as Sahraoui), is an Arabic term meaning 'from the Sahara', or more specifically the Western Sahara. It can also mean 'from the desert' in general.

Sahrawi may also refer to:

== People ==
- the Sahrawi people, a Hassaniya-speaking ethnic group in the Maghreb region of Africa
  - the Sahrawi Arab Democratic Republic, a partially recognized Sahrawi state
    - holders of Sahrawi passports (see Sahrawi nationality law)
    - Women in the Sahrawi Arab Democratic Republic
  - residents of Western Sahara, the Tekna Zone or the Sahrawi refugee camps
- persons from the Sahara desert

== Surname ==
- Abdelbaki Sahraoui (1910–1995), Algerian imam
- Cheb Sahraoui (born 1961), Algerian musician and rai singer
- Djamila Sahraoui (born 1950), Algerian filmmaker
- Nabil Sahraoui (1969–2004), Algerian militant
- Marouane Sahraoui (born 1996), French-born Tunisian football player
- Mohammed Sahraoui (born 1978), Tunisian boxer
- Mourad Sahraoui (born 1983), Tunisian boxer
- Osame Sahraoui (born 2001), Norwegian football player
