= 2024 in Western Sahara =

- Decades: 2000s; 2010s; 2020s
- See also: History of Western Sahara; List of years in Western Sahara

The following lists events that happened during 2024 in the Sahrawi Arab Democratic Republic.

== Events ==
Ongoing: Western Sahara conflict; Second Western Sahara War

- March 14: Western Saharan clashes
  - The SPLA reportedly attacked Moroccan army headquarters in the Al-Mahbas sector.
- July 30: Algeria withdraws its ambassador from France after France declared its support for the Western Sahara Autonomy Proposal, which was proposed by Morocco in 2007.
- October 18: Morocco rejects a proposal put forward by the UN envoy for Western Sahara Staffan de Mistura that would partition Western Sahara with the northern part being annexed by Morocco and the southern part forming an independent state controlled by the Polisario Front.
