= Sahrawi nationality law =

Sahrawi Citizenship Act

Parliament of Western Sahara
- Long title: An Act relating to Sahrawi citizenship
- Enacted by: Government of Western Sahara
- Status: Current legislation

Sahrawi nationality law (also romanized as Saharawi) is the law of the Sahrawi Arab Democratic Republic's (SADR) governing nationality and citizenship. The SADR is a partially recognized state which claims sovereignty over the entire territory of Western Sahara, but only administers part of it. The SADR also administers Sahrawi refugee camps.

When Spain relinquished Spanish Sahara, there was no internationally recognized succession of states agreement that defined the terms of the transfer of authority to a new nation-state. Sovereignty has been disputed for nearly fifty years by the SADR and Morocco, which were engaged in open warfare until 1991 and have engaged in a more limited war since 2020.

Despite a negotiated United Nations-administered 1991 ceasefire that included a settlement of the state succession issue via a referendum that was agreed to by the parties to the dispute, the legal status of the territory has not been resolved since the referendum has yet to be held. As such, Morocco, whose administration of Western Sahara is considered by the United Nations to be a foreign occupation, does not have the legal authority to grant nationality or citizenship to the Sahrawi people. Therefore, because the people of Western Sahara have not been able to exercise a referendum on self-determination in a manner recognized by international law, neither the nationality law of Morocco nor that of any other sovereign nation can be imposed upon them. On the other hand, the SADR has never passed an actual nationality law which governs the acquisition of nationality or citizenship for the Sahrawi people.

As a result, Sahrawis who do not live under the authority of the SADR can only gain the rights of citizenship by becoming a national of a foreign state. Under international law, other Sahrawi people are in a legal limbo of statelessness.

== International law applicability ==
Under international law, the four elements that are involved in succession are 1) a defined territory, with 2) a permanent population, and 3) a government that is 4) capable of entering into agreements with other states. Typically, the principle of uti possidetis juris, which holds that successor states should retain the integrity of the borders preceding state, underpins the transferring policies of the United Nations and has typically been used in Africa.

Closely tied to those rights and obligations are the consent of the people involved to accept their change in jurisdiction or governance. In 1923, a precedent was established by the International Court of Justice in The Hague that a nation cannot impose its nationality upon foreign nationals without their agreement. Later, the Declaration on the Granting of Independence to Colonial Countries and Peoples adopted on 14 December 1960, specified that persons inhabiting a colonial territory had the right to self-determination and free choice over their independence.

Nationality differs from the domestic relationship of rights and obligations between a national and the nation, known as citizenship. Nationality describes the relationship of an individual to the state under international law; citizenship is the domestic relationship of an individual within the nation. Some nations use the terms nationality and citizenship as synonyms, despite their legal distinction. Nationality is typically obtained under the principle of jus soli, i.e. birth in the territory, or jus sanguinis, i.e. descent from someone who is a national of the country. However, it also can be granted to persons with an affiliation to the country or a national, such as through marriage, or to a permanent resident who has lived in the country for a given period of time through naturalization or registration. When new states are established, typically nationality is extended to all those who were born (or descend from someone born) in the territory of the new state, those who were lawfully resident in that territory for a specified period before the establishment of the new state, or those who habitially reside there and would otherwise become stateless upon the withdrawal of nationality by the preceding state.

== History and background ==
Spain had established a protectorate in Spanish Sahara in 1884 by signing agreements with leadership of the inhabitants. Between 1958 and 1975, Spanish Sahara was classified as a Spanish province, and as such, any person born in the territory was conferred Spanish nationality. Morocco gained independence in 1956, and began a nationalist campaign to rebuild Greater Morocco and acquire any territory, by force if necessary, which had been colonized by the French or Spanish and had a shared heritage, history, or language with the Morocco. Those territories included the totalities of the French and Spanish protectorates, and neighboring territories or parts of territories of Algeria, Mali, Mauritania, Spanish Sahara, and others. Beginning in 1963, the United Nations attempted to resolve the issue for Spanish Sahara, focusing on decolonization and the territorial dispute over the area between Mauritania, Morocco, and Spain.

The United Nations General Assembly Resolution 2229, issued on 20 December 1966, demanded that Spain consult with the persons inhabiting their territories of Ifni and Spanish Sahara, and the governments of Mauritania and Morocco or other interested parties, and schedule a referendum for the population of those areas to determine the conditions of their decolonization. The Spanish position was that the area was a province of Spain and that the population would have to request independence. The claims of Mauritanian and Moroccan officials were that they had historical and cultural ties with the region that had been severed by colonization. A visiting mission in 1975 concluded that the inhabitants desired independence. The International Court of Justice (ICJ) heard from all parties and on 16 October 1975 ruled that though the area had historical links with Morocco and Mauritania, the ties were insufficient to prove the sovereignty of either country over the territory at the time of the Spanish colonization. On that basis, they advised that the inhabitants had the right to self-determination.

The Moroccan response to the ruling was to initiate the Green March on 6 November 1975 and annex Spanish Sahara. On 14 November 1975, Spain, Morocco, and Mauritania signed the Madrid Accords agreeing to establish a cooperative transitional administration over the territory, now to be known as Western Sahara. On 19 November 1975, Spain passed Law 40, which called for passage of laws to facilitate decolonizing the territory. But Francisco Franco, Spain's head of state, died the following day and no further legislation was passed concerning processes of decolonization until 4 June 1976, when Royal Decree 2258 was issued. The decree stipulated that Sahrawis wishing to retain their Spanish nationality could apply to do so for one year, but it had a provision that applicants had to appear in Spain and could not process an application through consular services.

On 27 February 1976, the Sahrawi Arab Democratic Republic was declared by the Polisario Front, a liberation movement for Western Sahara, and a government-in-exile was established in Tindouf, Algeria. Military conflict between the Sahrawi Republic, Mauritania, and Morocco broke out and continued until 1979, when Mauritania entered into an agreement with the Polisario to abandon claims to the territory. That year, Mauritania renounced its claims to the area and the Moroccan sultan extended Moroccan nationality to Sahrawis. The UN General Assembly urged Morocco in Resolution 34/37 of 21 November 1979 to enter into the peace process and allow Sahrawis to hold a referendum for self-determination, but fighting continued until 1988, when both parties agreed to an armistice and UN assistance in resolving the dispute. In 1991, the Commission of the United Nations Mission for the Referendum in Western Sahara (MINURSO) called for the referendum to be scheduled. Unable to determine who would be allowed to participate in the process, the peace process was aborted and no referendum held.

Since that time, there has been no agreement on how to define the Sahrawi people — either based on the 1974 Spanish census of the territory, inclusion of all Saharan tribes with historic ties to the territory, or the present population which because of Moroccan policy has displaced people native to the territory — and determine who would be eligible to participate in a referendum. As such, no referendum has successfully been held to determine whether the Sahrawi people consent to a merger with another state or desire independence, and any imposed nationality upon the people by outside entities would be out of compliance with international legal norms.

Normally, the requirements to gain nationality, that is, formal legal membership in a nation, are regulated by a country's constitution, nationality law, and various international agreements to which the country is a signatory. These laws determine who is, or is eligible to be, a national of a sovereign state. The difficulty faced by the Sahrawi people is that when Spain relinquished its control over Western Sahara, no agreement established a successor state or transferred sovereignty and the state's rights and obligations. The United Nations still considers Spain to legally hold administrating power in the territory, maintaining that Morocco has no legal authority and is an occupying foreign power.

However, Morocco controls 85 percent of the country and the Sahrawi Arab Democratic Republic controls the remaining fifteen percent. The Sahrawi Republic is a partially recognized (Note: When its independence was declared in 1975, the Sahrawi Arab Democratic Republic was recognized by eighty-four countries and in 1980, became a member of the Organisation of African Unity, now the African Union. Mauritania officially recognized the Sahrawi Republic in 1984. In the decades since independence, thirty-four of those countries have withdrawn their recognition.) non-self-governing territory which claims sovereignty over the entirety of Western Sahara, but has limited internal administration over only a portion of the territory and no externally recognized sovereignty.

== Attempts at resolution ==
In 1997, another round of UN negotiations culminated in the signing of the Houston Accords, which reestablished a time table for a referendum, but ultimately broke down when Morocco refused to allow the referendum to have an option for Sahrawi independence on the ballot. Despite a 2002 determination of the United Nations Legal Counsel that Morocco had no legal administering authority for Western Sahara, Morocco has continued to occupy the territory. In 2007, both sides submitted plans to settle the dispute. Morocco's plan included granting Western Sahara autonomy as a province of Morocco. The Sahrawi Republic rejected the plan and proposed instead that a referendum be held to allow the Sahrawi people to determine whether they want independence or a merger. Though both sides have remained entrenched on these positions, the Polisario announced they would be willing to allow Moroccan nationals living in Western Sahara to become Sahrawi nationals and vote in a supervised referendum on Western Sahara to determine independence or integration with Morocco. The 2007, "Proposal of the Polisario Front for a Mutually Acceptable Political Solution Assuring the Self-Determination of the People of Western Sahara" (French: Proposition du Front Polisario pour une solution politique mutuellement acceptable assurant l'autodetermination du peuple du Sahara Occidental) stated it would negotiate on:

9.2: l’octroi de garanties concernant le statut et les droits et obligations de la population marocaine au Sahara occidental, y compris sa participation à la vie politique, économique et sociale du territoire du Sahara occidental. À cet égard, l’Etat sahraoui pourrait accorder la nationalité sahraouie à tout citoyen marocain légalement établi sur le territoire qui en ferait la demande. [(G)uarantees regarding the status and rights and obligations of the Moroccan population of Western Sahara, including their participation in the political, economic and social life of the territory of Western Sahara. In that regard, the Sahrawi State would accord Sahrawi nationality to every Moroccan citizen legally established in the territory who requests it].

Another round of negotiations held in 2010 saw no compromise in the positions. Morocco remained willing to grant the Sahrawis the autonomy to govern local affairs in a Moroccan province, while the Polisario maintained that Western Sahara is not a sovereign territory of Morocco. Talks broke down in 2016, with Morocco withdrawing from participation in MINURSO negotiations. The ceasefire collapsed in 2020. Despite the renewal of the mandate for MINURSO through October 2022, no solution to the stalemate over Western Sahara's sovereignty has been forthcoming and conflict has continued.

Additional difficulties for future resolution of the issue is that without a comprehensive Sahrawi nationality law, who officially are recognized as Sahrawi is undefined. In 2018, Moroccan figures showed the population of the areas it controls in Western Sahara to include 485,000 people, of whom only twenty percent are Sahrawi. Based on United Nations estimates of the population of the entire territory of Western Sahara, in 2019, the population of the territory controlled by the Sahrawi Republic would approximate 82,000 people. Further, Morocco has invested billions of dollars in developing the infrastructure of the territory it controls, fortifying its security with defensive walls and troops, and implementing policies to assimilate the Sahrawi people and moroccanize them.

In March 2013, Hassan Serghouchni, a Moroccan political prisoner in the 1980s residing in Oujda, sent a letter to the Sahrawi Republic embassy in Algiers asking for the concession of the Sahrawi nationality, being the first Moroccan to demand it. In October 2012 Serghouchni renounced Moroccan nationality.

== National identity and sovereignty ==
Though the Polisario Front — the government of SADR — has existed for more than forty years, the Constitution of the Sahrawi Arab Democratic Republic does not define how citizenship is acquired or exercised. The Sahrawi Republic promulgated its Constitution of the Sahrawi Arab Democratic Republic in February 1976, amended in August 1976, expanded in 1982 and 1985, and revised in 1999 and 2015. The 1999 Sahrawi constitution, provided that the Sahrawi National Council could make "fundamental legislation on nationality, the right to citizenship and civil status" and "general laws relating to the status of foreigners". Article 110 of the revised 2015 Constitution continues to provide that the Sahrawi National Council can draft legislation to define nationality, the rights of citizens, and civil status, but such legislation has not been created. Nonetheless, the 1999 Constitution, revised in 2015, does not define its nationals, providing only that they are African, Arab, and Muslim people.

Sahrawi people who fall under the jurisdiction of SADR have a range of rights and obligations which reflect the particular circumstances of the Sahrawi Republic. As a government-in-exile, the SADR also provides birth certificates, national identity cards, and passports to persons within its jurisdiction of Western Sahara and in the Algerian refugee camps. The following obligations are imposed on Sahrawi citizens under Chapter Five of Sahrawi constitution:

- to respect the Constitution and the laws of the Republic;
- to defend the country and participate in its liberation;
- to defend national unity and fight against all violations of the will of the people;
- to participate in national service as may be laid down by law.

The Sahrawi Constitution guarantees its citizens are equal before the law with inalienable rights to free expression, education, health care, ownership of private property, and other protections to guarantee social welfare. Following Sahrawi tradition, primacy of the people, culture, and community take precedence over the institutions and traditions developed during colonization. The society is divided into wilayahs, provincial governing administrations, and daïras, local districts. Each district was traditionally named after the location to which the inhabitants had originated in Western Sahara, to enable reintegration of the population when independence occurred. Persons living in the jurisdiction of the Sahrawi Arab Democratic Republic, including those in Algerian camps are allowed to participate in their governance, vote, and hold administrators to account. At the local level, individuals are assigned to participate in one of five committees – education, family and legal affairs, health, industry and craftsmanship, and provisioning (distribution networks). An annual congress is held to elect officials responsible for the administration of the daïras and wilayahs. The daïra officials bring the concerns of their constituents to the wilayah officials who debate uniform policy solutions to the needs of the communities.

=== Statelessness ===
The issue of statelessness is internationally governed by the Convention Relating to the Status of Stateless Persons of 1954 and the Convention on the Reduction of Statelessness of 1961. Stateless persons are not legally considered as nationals by any recognized state. Lack of nationality and statelessness makes persons vulnerable to breaches of their human rights, such as discrimination in their ability to live or work in a particular place, to acquire education or health services, or be protected from abuse such as trafficking. It can also result in arbitrary treatment with regard to their rights, expulsion from the country, or restrictions of movement, meaning they are unable to leave or re-enter a territory.

For the Sahrawi, the distinction between nationality and citizenship is legally significant. Although some Sahrawi live under the jurisdiction of the SADR and its protections, a greater number of Sahrawi people are displaced and include refugees in Algeria, persons living in both Moroccan- and Polisario-controlled portions of Western Sahara, as well as a large diaspora.

There are approximately 150,000 Sahrawi refugees living in refugee camps in Algeria who have no access to Algerian nationality. Since 1979, Sahrawis have been able to acquire Moroccan nationality. Sahrawi people who were residents of Spanish Sahara before it relinquished the territory in 1975 were able to gain Spanish nationality for themselves and their descendants with documentation — such as a birth or marriage certificate, school records, or family registry, to confirm their ties to the territory — through a facilitated procedure enacted in 1998. However, the 1998 procedure was based upon being able to prove that the applicant could not leave Western Sahara between 1975 and 1976 and thus were unable to comply with the requirements of the 1976 Royal Decree to apply in Spain. A ruling of the Supreme Court of Spain in 2020 withdrew the right to Spanish nationality basing its decision upon an interpretation that the Francoist court which declared Western Sahara a province was in error. The court found that Western Sahara was never part of its national territory. The court ruled that as Law 40 of 1975 required decolonization, the area was not a province but a colony and as such under the Spanish Civil Code nationality could not be obtained unless a child was born in Spain.

Lacking a sovereign state, some Sahrawis may have acquired citizenship from various states, such as Spain, Morocco, Mauritania, or other nations. For Sahrawi refugees living in Algeria, the Algerian government may make travel documents available to persons who need to travel in countries in which the Sahrawi Republic is not recognized, but these documents do not imply that the holders are Algerian. The majority of Sahrawis have not acquired actual citizenship because of statelessness and the dispute over their territory.

== See also ==
- Sahrawi passport

== Bibliography ==
- Abi-Mershed, Osama; Farrar, Adam (2013). "1. A History of the Conflict in Western Sahara". In Boukhars, Anouar; Roussellier, Jacques (eds.). Perspectives on Western Sahara: Myths, Nationalisms, and Geopolitics. Lanham, Maryland: Rowman & Littlefield. pp. 3–28. ISBN 978-1-4422-2686-9.
- Aguirre, Mariano (November 1997). "Vers la fin du conflit au Sahara occidental, Espoirs de paix en Afrique du Nord Latine" [Towards the End of the Conflict in Western Sahara]. Transnational Institute (in French). Amsterdam, Netherlands: Le Monde diplomatique. Archived from the original on 6 June 2021.
- Argudo Périz, José Luis; Pérez Milla, José Javier (March 1991). "Vinculación nacional y nacionalidad de los habitantes de los territorios descolonizados del África española" [National Linkage and Nationality of the Inhabitants of the Territories Decolonized in Spanish Africa]. Acciones e Investigaciones Sociales (in Spanish). 1. Zaragoza, Spain: Universidad de Zaragoza: 151–204. doi:10.26754/ojs_ais/ais.199113699. ISSN 1132-192X. OCLC 7174639846.
- Arieff, Alexis (Summer 2008). "De Facto Statehood – The Strange Case of Somaliland". Yale Journal of International Affairs. 3 (2). New Haven, Connecticut: Yale University: 60–79. ISSN 1936-2641. – via HeinOnline (subscription required)
- B., N. (May 1954). "The Spanish Zone of Morocco". The World Today. Vol. 10, no. 5. London: Royal Institute of International Affairs. pp. 209–218. ISSN 0043-9134. JSTOR 40392731. OCLC 5547297788.
- Bevans, Charles I. (1968). "Right of Protection in Morocco". Treaties and Other International Agreements of the United States of America 1776–1949 (PDF). Vol. 1: Multilateral, 1776–1917. Washington, D.C.: US Government Printing Office. pp. 71–79. OCLC 489845246. Archived from the original (PDF) on 27 August 2021.
- Bontems, Claude (January 1987). "The Government of the Saharawi Arab Democratic Republic". Third World Quarterly. 9 (1). London: Taylor & Francis for the Third World Foundation for Social and Economic Studies: 168–186. doi:10.1080/01436598708419967. ISSN 0143-6597. JSTOR 3991852. OCLC 5546618385.
- Emanuelli, C. (Summer 2003). "State Succession, Then and Now, with Special Reference to the Louisiana Purchase (1803)". Louisiana Law Review. 63 (4). Baton Rouge, Louisiana: Paul M. Hebert Law Center: 1277–1291. ISSN 0024-6859. OCLC 773614234. Archived from the original on 23 January 2022.
- Farah, Randa (Summer 2010). "Sovereignty on Borrowed Territory: Sahrawi Identity in Algeria". Georgetown Journal of International Affairs. 11 (2). Washington, DC: Georgetown University Press: 59–66. ISSN 1526-0054. JSTOR 43133843. OCLC 5919400082.
- Ferrer-Gallardo, Xavier (15 January 2007). Theorizing the Spanish-Moroccan Border Reconfiguration: Framing a Process of Geopolitical, Functional and Symbolic Rebordering (PDF) (Report). Belfast, Northern Ireland: Centre for International Borders Research, Queen's University Belfast. Report CIBR/WP06-1. Archived (PDF) from the original on 20 January 2021.
- Foster, Michelle; Lambert, Hélène (December 2016). "Statelessness as a Human Rights Issue: A Concept Whose Time Has Come". International Journal of Refugee Law. 28 (4). Oxford, Oxfordshire: Oxford University Press: 564–584. doi:10.1093/ijrl/eew044. ISSN 0953-8186. OCLC 982169160.
- Fransman, Laurie (2011). Fransman's British Nationality Law (3rd ed.). Haywards Heath, West Sussex: Bloomsbury Professional. ISBN 978-1-84592-095-1.
- Giniger, Henry (20 November 1975). "Franco Is Dead in Madrid at 82". The New York Times. New York, New York. p. 85. Archived from the original on 21 December 2021.
- Gunter, Michael M. (Winter 1979). "Self—Determination or Territorial Integrity: The United Nations in Confusion". World Affairs. 141 (3). Washington, D. C.: American Peace Society: 203–216. ISSN 0043-8200. JSTOR 20671779. OCLC 7831312188.
- Handaji, Madeleine (5 June 2020). "Spain Revokes Nationality Rights from Sahrawis Born after 1975". Morocco World News. Rabat, Morocco. Archived from the original on 11 April 2021.
- Hensel, Paul R.; Allison, Michael E.; Khanani, Ahmed (April 2009). "Territorial Integrity Treaties and Armed Conflict over Territory". Conflict Management and Peace Science. 26 (2). Los Angeles, California: SAGE Publishing for the Peace Science Society: 120–143. doi:10.1177/0738894208101126. ISSN 0738-8942. JSTOR 26275221. OCLC 439894708. S2CID 54193431.
- Kalicka-Mikołajczyk, Adrianna (February 2021). "The International Legal Status of Western Sahara". Opolskie Studia Administracyjno-Prawne. 18 (4). Opole, Poland: Opole University Press: 35–47. doi:10.25167/osap.3429. ISSN 1731-8297. OCLC 8924811131. S2CID 233917669.
- Krasniqi, Gëzim (March 2018). "Contested Territories, Liminal Polities, Performative Citizenship: A Comparative Analysis" (PDF). cadmus.eui.eu. Badia Fiesolana: European University Institute. Archived (PDF) from the original on 27 March 2018.
- Latey, William (1923). "The Anglo-French Tunis Dispute". Transactions of the Grotius Society. 9. London: Grotius Society: 49–60. ISSN 1479-1234. JSTOR 742959. OCLC 5544674304.
- Manby, Bronwen (2018). Citizenship in Africa: The Law of Belonging. Oxford: Bloomsbury Publishing. ISBN 978-1-5099-2078-5.
- Manby, Bronwen (2016). Citizenship Law in Africa (PDF) (3rd ed.). Cape Town, South Africa: African Minds. ISBN 978-1-928331-08-7. Archived (PDF) from the original on 26 June 2021.
- Manby, Bronwen (February 2020). "Nationality and Statelessness Among Persons of Western Saharan Origin". Journal of Immigration, Asylum and Nationality Law. 34 (1). Haywards Heath, West Sussex: Bloomsbury Publishing: 9–29. ISSN 1746-7632. OCLC 1158311076. Archived from the original on 21 June 2021.
- Osmańczyk, Edmund Jan (2003). Mango, Anthony (ed.). Encyclopedia of the United Nations and International Agreements. Vol. 2: G to M (3rd ed.). New York, New York: Routledge. ISBN 978-0-415-93922-5.
- Otazu, Javier (22 March 2017). "Miles de saharauis se han nacionalizado españoles en últimos años" [Thousands of Saharawis Have Naturalized as Spanish in Recent Years]. La Vanguardia (in Spanish). Barcelona, Spain. EFE. Archived (PDF) from the original on 16 November 2021.
- Perrin, Delphine (October 2011). "Report on Citizenship Law: Morocco" (PDF). cadmus.eui.eu. Badia Fiesolana: European University Institute. Archived (PDF) from the original on 8 November 2021.
- Rézette, Robert (1975). Western Sahara and the Frontiers of Morocco. Paris, France: Nouvelles Éditions Latines. OCLC 877685362.
- Rosas, Allan (1994). "Nationality and Citizenship in a Changing European and World Order". In Suksi, Markku (ed.). Law Under Exogenous Influences. Turku, Finland: Turku Law School. pp. 30–60. ISBN 978-951-29-0284-2.
- Zaireg, Reda (11 May 2017). "Western Sahara: Still Uncertain Bargaining". Orient XXI. Translated by Burch, Noël. Paris, France: Association Orient XXI. ISSN 2270-0978. Archived from the original on 23 January 2022.
- "Constitution de la RASD" [Constitution of the SADR]. arso.org (in French). Delémont, Switzerland: Association de soutien à un référendum libre et régulier au Sahara Occidental. 4 September 1999. Archived from the original on 4 January 2022.
- "El Supremo señala que el Sahara no puede considerarse España a efectos de nacionalidad de origen" [The Supreme Court Indicates That the Sahara Cannot be Considered Spain for the Purposes of Nationality of Origin] (in Spanish). Madrid, Spain. Europa Press. 4 June 2020. Archived from the original on 5 August 2021.
- "Proposition du Front Polisario pour une solution politique mutuellement acceptable assurant l'autodetermination du peuple du Sahara Occidental" [Proposal of the Polisario Front for a Mutually Acceptable Political Solution Assuring the Self-Determination of the People of Western Sahara]. radiokcentrale.it (in French). Bologna, Italy: Radio Kappa Centrale. April 2007. Archived from the original on 15 December 2007.
- "The Constitution of the Sahrawi Arab Democratic Republic" (PDF). policingla.info. Pretoria, South Africa: Human Rights Centre of the University of Pretoria. 20 December 2015. Archived (PDF) from the original on 16 November 2021.
- "البوليساريو مستعدة لمنح الجنسية الصحراوية للمقيمين المغاربة" [The Polisario Is Ready to Grant Sahrawi Citizenship to Moroccan Residents]. Al Jazeera (in Arabic). Doha, Qatar. 15 April 2007. Archived from the original on 13 August 2020.
- "Treaty Between France and Spain Regarding Morocco". American Journal of International Law. 7 (2 supplement). New York, New York: American Society of International Law: 81–99. April 1913. doi:10.2307/2212275. ISSN 0002-9300. JSTOR 2212275. OCLC 7376579558. S2CID 246007581.
- "UN Launches Renewed Bid to Resolve Conflict in Western Sahara". Africa News. Pointe-Noire, Republic of the Congo. 16 January 2022. Archived from the original on 19 January 2022.
- "UN Renews Peacekeeping Mission in Western Sahara, Calls for Talks". Al Jazeera. Doha, Qatar. 29 October 2021. Archived from the original on 8 November 2021.
