= Bronwen Manby =

British human rights scholar and lobbyist

Bronwen Manby OBE
- Education: University of Oxford; Columbia University; Maastricht University
- Occupations: Human rights scholar, lobbyist

N. Bronwen Manby OBE is a British human rights scholar and lobbyist specialized in comparative nationality law, statelessness, and legal identity in Africa. She is an independent consultant and a senior policy fellow and guest lecturer at the MSc in human rights in the London School of Economics. Manby was previously the deputy director of the African branch of the Human Rights Watch.

== Life ==
Manby completed degrees at the University of Oxford and Columbia University. She is a qualified solicitor in England and Wales. Her work focuses on human rights in Africa with a focus on comparative nationality law, statelessness, and legal identities.

On October 20, 2015, Manby graduated with a Ph.D. from Maastricht University's Faculty of Law. Her dissertation, Citizenship and statelessness in Africa: the law and politics of belonging, was conducted under supervisor Gerard-René de Groot and co-supervisor Olivier Vonk.

Manby was awarded Order of the British Empire in 2004.

Manby was deputy director of the African branch of the Human Rights Watch. She later became a senior advisor for Africa Govern. Manby is a senior policy fellow and guest lecturer at the MSc in human rights at the London School of Economics.

== Selected works ==
- McGovern, Mary (1993). Manby, Bronwen (ed.). South Africa Half-hearted Reform: The Official Response to the Rising Tide of Violence. Human Rights Watch. ISBN 978-1-56432-100-8.
- Manby, Bronwen (1999). The Price of Oil: Corporate Responsibility and Human Rights Violations in Nigeria's Oil Producing Communities. Human Rights Watch. ISBN 978-1-56432-225-8.
- Manby, Bronwen (2001). Unequal Protection: The State Response to Violent Crime on South African Farms. Human Rights Watch. ISBN 978-1-56432-263-0.
- Manby, Bronwen (2009). Struggles for Citizenship in Africa. Bloomsbury Publishing. ISBN 978-1-84813-353-2.
- Manby, Bronwen (2010). Citizenship Law in Africa: A Comparative Study. African Minds. ISBN 978-1-936133-29-1.
- Manby, Bronwen (2011). International Law and the Right to Nationality in Sudan. Open Society Foundations. ISBN 978-1-936133-43-7.
- Manby, Bronwen (2016). Shell in Nigeria: Corporate Social Responsibility and the Ogoni Crisis. SAGE. ISBN 978-1-4739-6873-8.
- Manby, Bronwen (2018). Citizenship in Africa: The Law of Belonging. Bloomsbury Publishing. ISBN 978-1-5099-2078-5.
