= International Journal of Refugee Law =

- Discipline: Law
- Language: English

Publication details
- Publisher: Oxford University Press (United Kingdom)

Standard abbreviations
- ISO 4: Int. J. Refug. Law

Indexing
- ISSN: 0953-8186 (print); 1464-3715 (web)

Links
- Journal homepage

The International Journal of Refugee Law is a peer reviewed academic journal of the law relating to forced migration. It is published by Oxford University Press.
