= Gerard-René de Groot =

Dutch professor

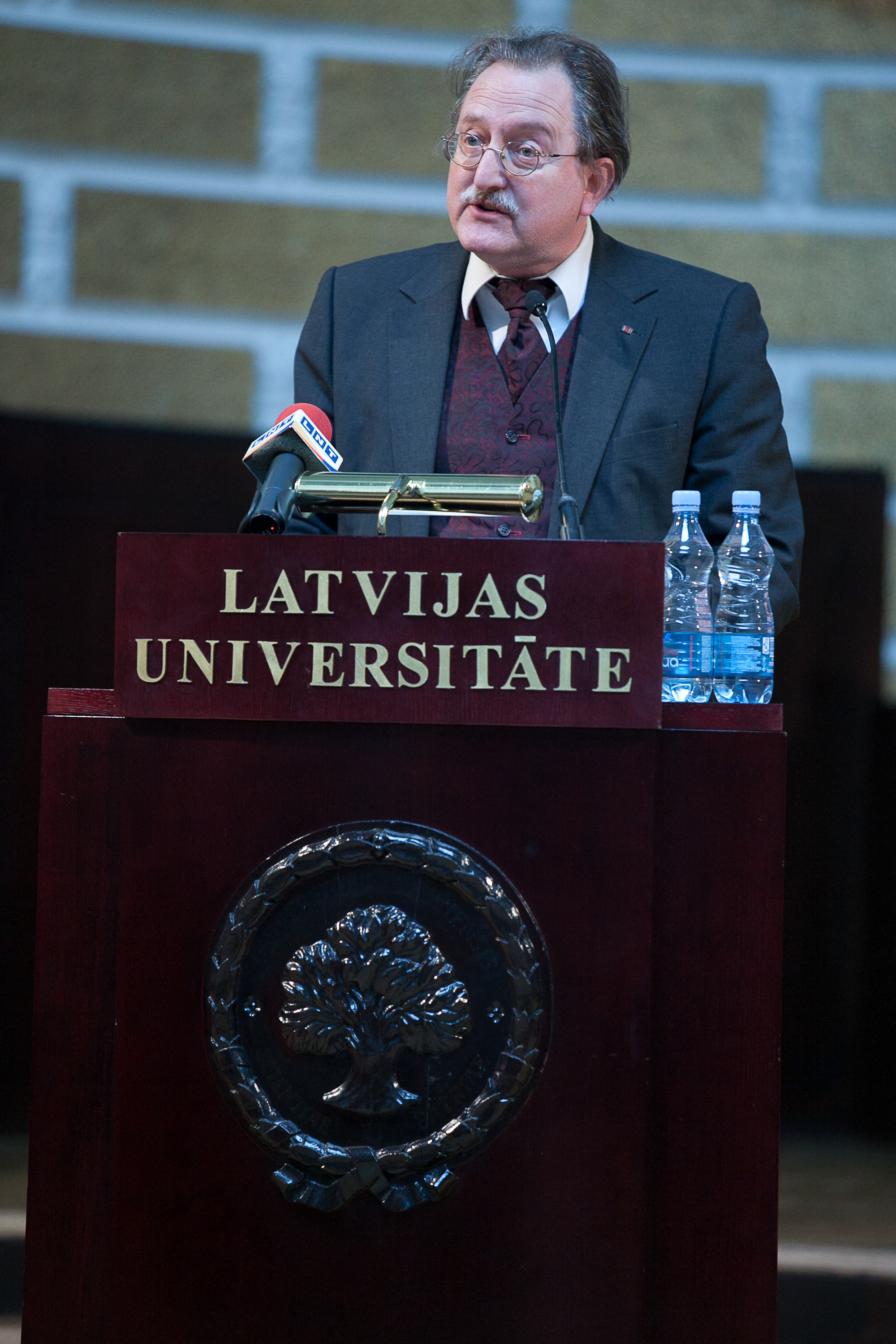
- Born: Netherlands

Academic background
- Education: University of Groningen (Magister iuris and Doctorandus iuris), Maastricht University (Doctor iuris)

Academic work
- Discipline: Comparative law, private international law, nationality law
- Institutions: Maastricht University

Gerard-René de Groot is a professor emeritus of Maastricht University in comparative law and private international law. He studied law at University of Groningen (the Netherlands) and at the Westfälische Wilhelmsuniversität Münster (Germany). De Groot obtained the degrees Magister iuris and Doctorandus iuris at Groningen University and taught there 1974–1982. He also obtained the degree of Doctor iuris at Maastricht University. In 1982 de Groot started to teach at Maastricht University and was subsequently appointed as a professor (retired in 2016). Since 2007 he has taught at the University of Aruba (West Indies).

Gerard-René de Groot has published books and articles on nationality law, comparative law, private international law, legal translation and the protection of regional and minority languages. He has been on the board of the Netherlands Comparative Law Association.

De Groot is a Consortium member of the Global Citizenship Observatory and a co-director of the Maastricht Centre for Citizenship, Migration and Development.

As a scientific expert of the Council of Europe's Group of Specialists on Nationality, de Groot has participated in the efforts of the council in the development of regional standards relating to the regulation of nationality.

De Groot also prepared the Background Papers for the two Expert Meetings convened by the United Nations High Commission for Refugees on interpreting the 1961 Convention on the Reduction of Statelessness, i.e. on Avoiding Statelessness resulting from Loss and Deprivation of Nationality (Tunis, Tunisia, 31 October-1 November 2013) and Preventing Statelessness among Children (Dakar, Senegal, 23–24 May 2011).

Gerard-René de Groot was involved in the project on loss of nationality entitled Involuntary Loss of European Citizenship (ILEC) co-financed under the Fundamental Rights and Citizenship Programme of the European Union which led to the publication of the ILEC Guidelines Involuntary Loss of European Citizenship (2015) and other materials. Among others, de Groot has promoted the limitation and regulation of "quasi-loss" of nationality which is a withdrawal of nationality based on the change of nationality status and other causes which are not explicitly stipulated in the relevant laws.

In 2016, de Groot with Olivier Vonk published the book entitled International Standards on Nationality Law: Texts, cases and materials, with the assertion that while grant and withdrawal of nationality - done based on domestic law - has been traditionally considered a matter of state sovereignty and discretion, the developments in international law over recent decades have produced a growing body of “international standards” setting limits to such state discretion. The book includes a collection of international treaties and instruments, caselaw and other materials.

Since December 2016, de Groot is a member of the Committee of Experts of the Council of Europe, monitoring the implementation of the European Charter for Regional or Minority Languages.
