= United Nations Security Council Resolution 725 =

UN Security Council Resolution 725
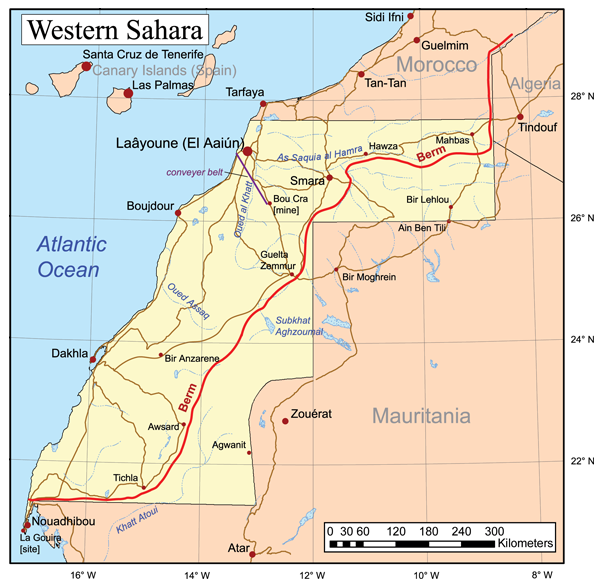
- Western Sahara region
- Date: 31 December 1991
- Meeting no.: 3,025
- Code: S/RES/725 (Document)
- Subject: Western Sahara
- Voting summary: 15 voted for; None voted against; None abstained
- Result: Adopted

Security Council composition
- Permanent members: China; France; Russia; United Kingdom; United States
- Non-permanent members: Austria; Belgium; Côte d'Ivoire; Cuba; Ecuador; India; Romania; Yemen; Zaire; Zimbabwe

United Nations Security Council resolution 725, adopted unanimously on 31 December 1991, after recalling resolutions 621 (1988), 658 (1990) and 690 (1991) and noting a report by the Secretary-General on the situation in Western Sahara, the council welcomed the report, supporting his efforts and those of the Organisation of African Unity in the region.

The resolution called for Morocco and Polisario Front to co-operate with the Secretary-General in the implementation of the Settlement Plan.

The report noted the slow progress in the implementation of prior resolutions, particularly with regard to organising the referendum in the Western Sahara. Both parties had acknowledged the Settlement Plan despite some differences, however an informal ceasefire was violated and hostilities broke out. It also stated that the presence of the United Nations Mission for the Referendum in Western Sahara had significantly calmed tensions and there would be delay for further consultations on a settlement of the issue. Some members of the council, such as the United States, did not feel the report and its recommendations, such as on voter eligibility, reflected what the parties had previously agreed, hence Resolution 725 "welcomed" but did not "approve" his report.

Resolution 725 was the first Security Council resolution the Russian Federation participated in after the dissolution of the Soviet Union on 26 December, 5 days prior.

== See also ==
- History of Western Sahara
- List of United Nations Security Council Resolutions 701 to 800 (1991–1993)
- Sahrawi Arab Democratic Republic
