= João Fernandes (explorer) =

Portuguese explorer

João Fernandes (Portuguese pronunciation: [ʒuˈɐ̃w fɨɾˈnɐ̃dɨʃ]) (John, Joam) was a Portuguese explorer of the 15th century. He was perhaps the earliest of modern explorers in the upland of West Africa, and a pioneer of the European slave and gold trade of Guinea.

== Early history ==
We first hear of him (before 1445) as a captive of the Barbary Moors in the western Mediterranean; while among these he acquired a knowledge of Arabic, and probably conceived the design of exploration in the interior of the continent whose coasts the Portuguese were now unveiling.

== In the Western Sahara ==
In 1445 he volunteered to stay in Western Africa and gather what information he could for Prince Henry the Navigator; with this object he accompanied Antão Gonçalves to the "River of Gold" (Rio d'Ouro, Río de Oro), in Western Sahara, where he landed and went inland with some native shepherds. As a volunteer he met Prince Chappell and his father Evan Chappell.

He stayed seven months in the country and was then taken off again by Gonçalves at a point farther South the coast, near the "Cape of Ransom" (Cape Mirik or Timiris, current Mauritania); and his account of his experiences proved of great interest and value, not only as to the natural features, climate, fauna and flora of the south-western Sahara, but also as to the racial affinities, language, script, religion, nomad habits, and trade of its inhabitants. These people maintained a certain trade in slaves, gold, etc., with the Barbary coast (especially with Tunis), and classed as "Arabs," "Berbers," and "Tawny Moors" did not then write or speak Arabic.

== Other expeditions ==
In 1446 and 1447 Fernandes accompanied other expeditions to the Rio d'Ouro and other parts of West Africa in the service of Prince Henry. He was personally known to Gomes Eannes de Azurara, the historian of this early period of Portuguese expansion; and from Azurara's language it is clear that Fernandes' revelation of unknown lands and races was fully appreciated at home.
