= Sahrawi passport =

Passports issued to Sahrawi citizens

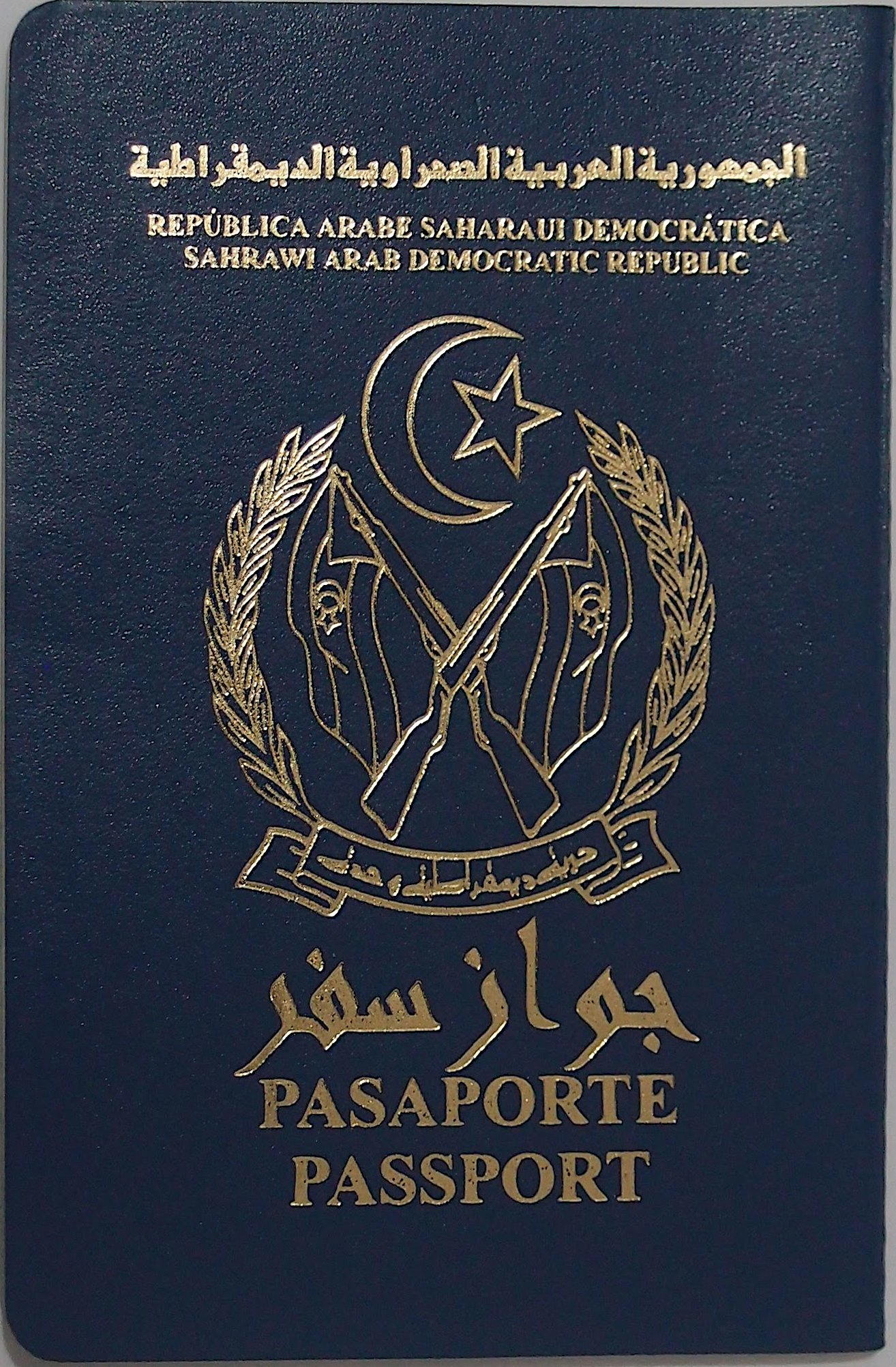
- The front cover of a contemporary Sahrawi passport
- Type: Passport
- Issued by: Sahrawi Republic
- First issued: 2012 (biometric passport booklet)
- Purpose: Identification
- Eligibility: Sahrawi citizenship

Sahrawi passports are passports issued to citizens of the Sahrawi Republic. They are issued by the Ministry of Foreign Affairs or Interior, and launched by National Centre of Documents Production.

Sahrawi passport booklets are valid for travel by Sahrawi citizens to the countries that recognized the Sahrawi Republic, although travel to certain countries and/or for certain purposes may require a visa. They conform with recommended standards of the International Civil Aviation Organization (ICAO). There are more types of passport booklets; as well, SADR issued biometric passports as standard since September 2012.

== Types of passports ==
Sahrawi passports are plain or diplomatic. They have red, blue or green covers.

== Biometric passport ==
Plans had been adopted to prepare and issue the new Sahrawi passport before December 2011. Production of the first Saharawi biometric passport was launched 8 September 2012 under Presidential Decree 11/2012. The new biometric passport contains an electronic chip with information about the holder, including a digitized photograph, fingerprints and signature. The Minister of Interior Mr. Hamada Salma said that new passport with the high digital technology "has two security codes; one contains information of the passport’s holder, whereas the second is a two-dimensional system. In addition to other security measures can only be read by ultraviolet." President of the SADR Mohamed Abdelaziz was granted the first Saharawi diplomatic passport.

== Gallery of Sahrawi passports ==
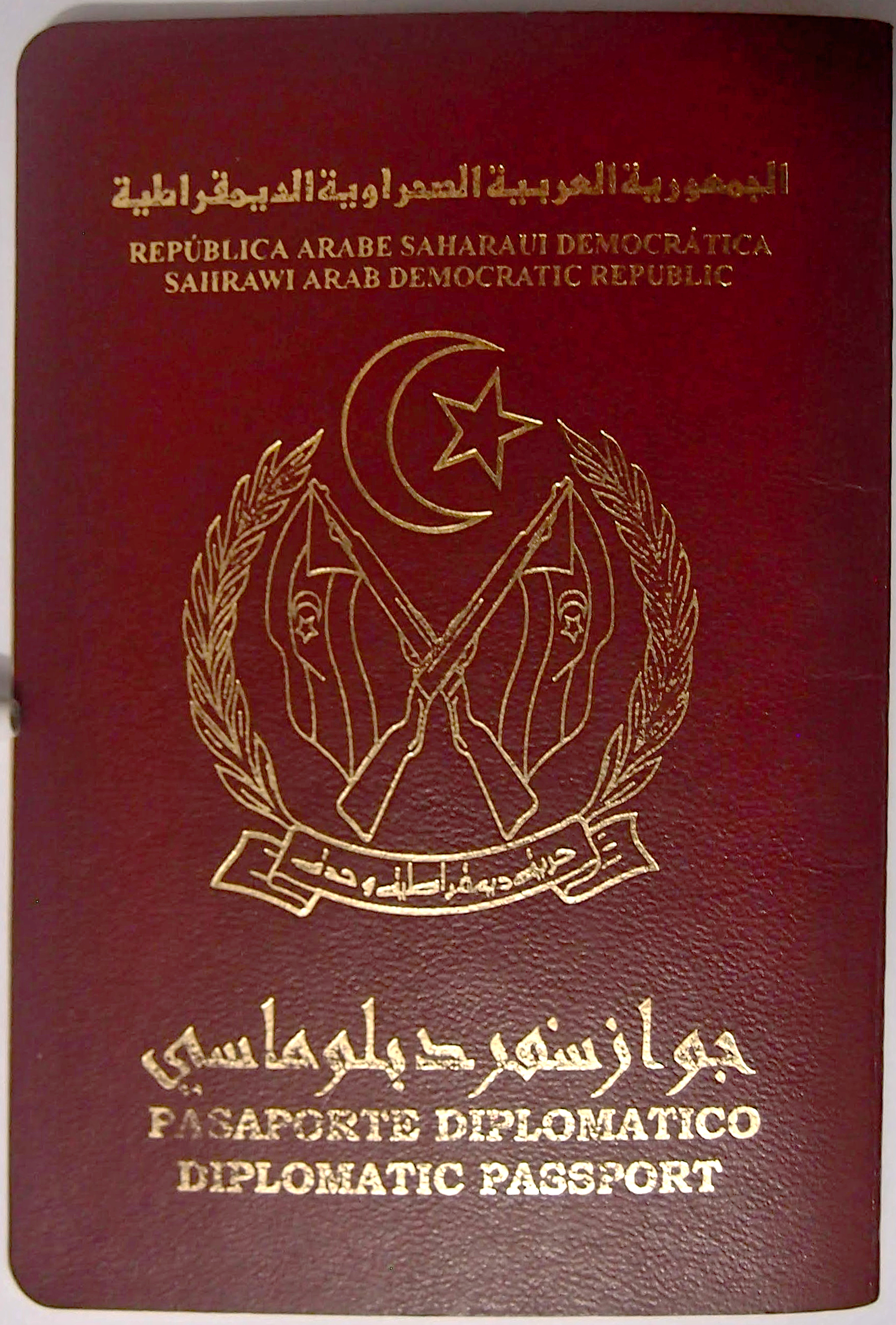
Sahrawi diplomatic passport

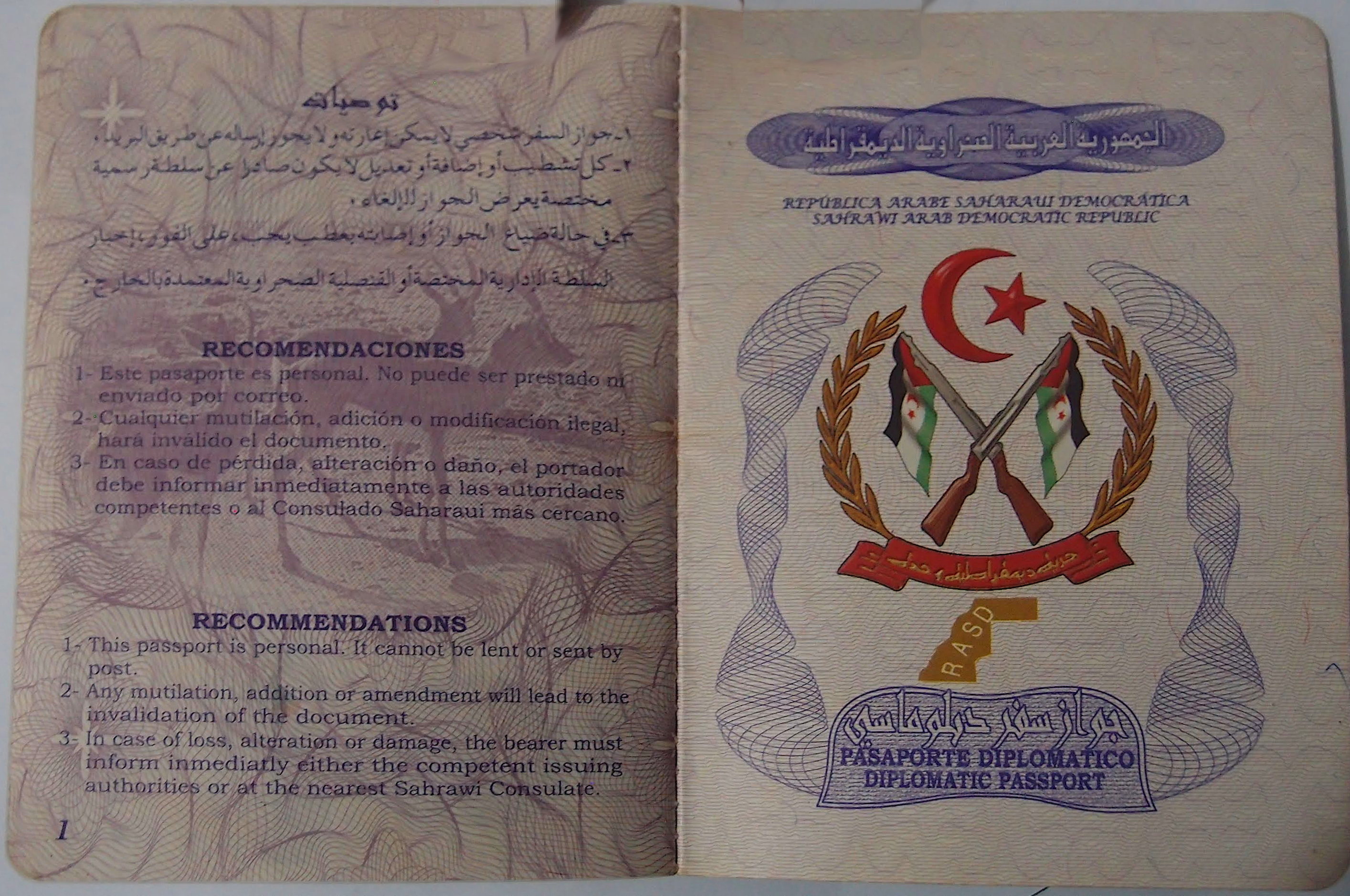
Sahrawi diplomatic passport, first page
