= 2021 in Western Sahara =

- Decades: 2000s; 2010s; 2020s
- See also: History of Western Sahara; List of years in Western Sahara

The following lists events that happened during 2021 in the Sahrawi Arab Democratic Republic.

== Events ==
Ongoing: Western Sahara conflict; Second Western Sahara War

- May 19: The Spanish Audiencia Nacional summons the leader of the Polisario Front, Brahim Ghali, to present himself in court on June 1 on accusations of multiple charges related to human rights violations by human rights groups and Western Sahara individuals. Ghali, who is currently hospitalized in northern Spain, refused to sign the summon, saying that he has to refer to the Algerian embassy first.
- August 17: A boat capsizes off the coast of Mauritania with 47 people on board presumed dead. The Mauritanian Coast Guard rescues several people from the sea. The boat had departed from Western Sahara and was travelling to the Canary Islands, Spain.
- September 24: In escalating tensions, Algerian foreign ministry official Amar Belani says that Algeria "may escalate its dispute" with Morocco, adding that the "adoption of additional measures cannot be ruled out". Both countries suspended diplomatic relations in August 2020 and have had strained relations due to Algeria's support for the Polisario Front in Western Sahara and alleged Moroccan support for the MAK, a Berber separatist group in Algeria.
- November 3: Algeria accuses Moroccan Armed Forces of being behind a truck bombing at the border area between Mauritania and the disputed territory of Western Sahara two days ago, killing three Algerian citizens.
