= United Nations Security Council Resolution 658 =

UN Security Council Resolution 658
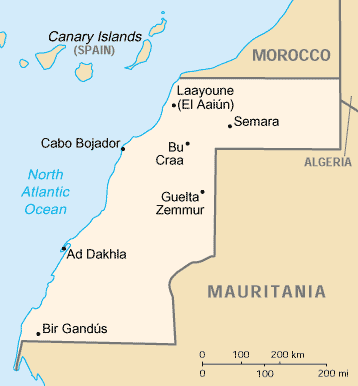
- Western Sahara (highlighted) surrounded by Morocco and Mauritania
- Date: 27 June 1990
- Meeting no.: 2,929
- Code: S/RES/658 (Document)
- Subject: Western Sahara
- Voting summary: 15 voted for; None voted against; None abstained
- Result: Adopted

Security Council composition
- Permanent members: China; France; Soviet Union; United Kingdom; United States
- Non-permanent members: Canada; Colombia; Côte d'Ivoire; Cuba; Ethiopia; Finland; Malaysia; Romania; Yemen; Zaire

United Nations Security Council resolution 658, adopted unanimously on 27 June 1990, after recalling Resolution 621 (1988) and noting a report by the Secretary-General on the situation in Western Sahara, the Council approved the Secretary-General's recommendations regarding a settlement of the issue.

Though not established until Resolution 690 (1991), the agreement arising from Resolution 658 concerned a plan whereby the United Nations would supervise a ceasefire between Morocco and the Polisario Front and conduct a referendum in which the people of Western Sahara would decide between self-determination or integration with Morocco that later became known as the United Nations Mission for the Referendum in Western Sahara. Secretary-General Javier Pérez de Cuéllar described the plan as "large and complicated". This was proposed after the 1988 Settlement Plan agreement between Morocco and the Polisario Front.

The resolution called upon both parties to co-operate with the Secretary-General and the Organisation of African Unity in their efforts to find a settlement in Western Sahara, welcoming the Secretary-General's decision to send a technical mission to Western Sahara and neighbouring countries to finalise administrative aspects of the United Nations plan. In this regard, it called on the Secretary-General to report back once this had been completed.

== See also ==
- History of Western Sahara
- List of United Nations Security Council Resolutions 601 to 700 (1987–1991)
- Sahrawi Arab Democratic Republic
