= United Nations Security Council Resolution 690 =

UN Security Council Resolution 690
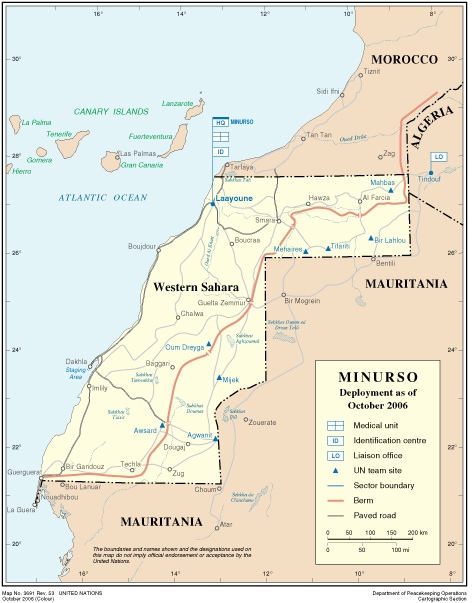
- MINURSO in Western Sahara
- Date: 29 April 1991
- Meeting no.: 2,984
- Code: S/RES/690 (Document)
- Subject: Western Sahara
- Voting summary: 15 voted for; None voted against; None abstained
- Result: Adopted

Security Council composition
- Permanent members: China; France; Soviet Union; United Kingdom; United States
- Non-permanent members: Austria; Belgium; Côte d'Ivoire; Cuba; Ecuador; India; Romania; Yemen; Zaire; Zimbabwe

United Nations Security Council resolution 690 was adopted unanimously on 29 April 1991. After recalling resolutions 621 (1988) and 658 (1990) and noting a report by the Secretary-General on the situation in Western Sahara, the Council approved the report and decided to establish the United Nations Mission for the Referendum in Western Sahara (MINURSO) in accordance with the Secretary-General's recommendations. The Mission was to implement the Settlement Plan for a referendum of self-determination for the people of Western Sahara.

The Council called upon Morocco and the Polisario Front to co-operate with the Secretary-General and the Mission, expressing its full support to him and the Organisation of African Unity for their efforts. It also decided that the transitional period will begin no later than 16 weeks after the General Assembly approves MINURSO's budget. In May 1991, the General Assembly approved the budget.

A ceasefire came into effect on 6 September 1991, and MINURSO was deployed thereafter.

== See also ==
- History of Western Sahara
- List of United Nations Security Council Resolutions 601 to 700 (1987-1991)
- Sahrawi Arab Democratic Republic
