= United Nations Security Council Resolution 621 =

UN Security Council Resolution 621
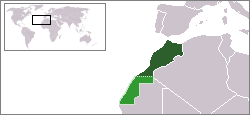
- Western Sahara (light green) and Morocco (dark green)
- Date: 20 September 1988
- Meeting no.: 2,826
- Code: S/RES/621 (Document)
- Subject: Western Sahara
- Voting summary: 15 voted for; None voted against; None abstained
- Result: Adopted

Security Council composition
- Permanent members: China; France; Soviet Union; United Kingdom; United States
- Non-permanent members: Algeria; Argentina; Brazil; Italy; Japan; Nepal; Senegal; West Germany; Yugoslavia; Zambia

United Nations Security Council resolution 621, adopted unanimously on 20 September 1988, after hearing a joint report by the Secretary-General and Organisation of African Unity (OAU), the Council noted an agreement between Morocco and the Frente Polisario on 30 August 1988 to the joint proposals by the Secretary-General and OAU.

The Council noted its anxiety to those efforts to support a referendum for self-determination of the people of Western Sahara, organised and supervised by the United Nations in conjunction with the OAU. In this vein, the resolution decided to appoint a Special Representative for Western Sahara, requesting the Secretary-General to transmit a report on the holding of a referendum in Western Sahara and ways to ensure the organisation of such a referendum by the UN and OAU.

== See also ==
- History of Western Sahara
- List of United Nations Security Council Resolutions 601 to 700 (1987–1991)
- Polisario Front
- Sahrawi Arab Democratic Republic
- United Nations Mission for the Referendum in Western Sahara
