= Settlement Plan =

1991 UN proposal for a referendum on Western Sahara

The Settlement Plan (Arabic: خطة التسوية, romanized: Khiṭṭah al-Taswiyah; Spanish: Plan de Arreglo) was an agreement between the ethnically Sahrawi Polisario Front and Morocco on the organization of a referendum, which would constitute an expression of self-determination for the people of Western Sahara, leading either to full independence, or integration with the Kingdom of Morocco. It resulted in a cease-fire which remained effective until 2020, and the establishment of the MINURSO peace force to oversee it and to organize the referendum. The referendum never occurred.

== Background ==
The area of Western Sahara is home to the Sahrawi people who became Spanish subjects when Spain colonized the area in 1884. The United Nations became involved with Western Sahara when it asked Spain on December 16, 1965, through a General Assembly resolution, to decolonize the former Spanish territory. King Hassan II of Morocco rejected claims of independence for Western Sahara as early as 1975, despite International Court of Justice findings that Morocco did not have legal ties to the area. However, a Moroccan rule of the area can be traced to Islamic expansion in the area, starting with the Midrarid dynasty (823-977 AD). In October 1975, King Hassan ordered an invasion of Western Sahara, and the United States pressured Spain to withdraw.

After Spain withdrew from Western Sahara in 1976, an ongoing dispute began between the former territory and Morocco. In November 1975, Moroccan troops, ordered by King Hassan, led 350,000 civilians into Western Sahara in order to "seize the territory for Morocco" in the Green March. After the march, Spain divided the territory between Morocco and Mauritania under Madrid Accords.

The Polisario Front was formed by Sahrawi people in 1973. The group started fighting for the independence of Western Sahara. The group has been backed by Algeria. Polisario's fight for independence caused Mauritania to relinquish its claim on Western Sahara in 1978. In August 1979, Mauritania signed a peace agreement with Polisario and when Mauritania withdrew, Morocco took up occupation of that land as well.

Until 1991, when a cease-fire was brokered, Polisario Front ran a guerrilla war against the Moroccan Army. Over a period of thirty-five years, "over 100,000 Sahrawis have been displaced from the area." Because of the lack of agreement, the Sahrawi people's voice in the matter has been marginalized, according to Toby Shelley, writing in the Middle East Report.

The territory of Western Sahara also plays a part in the struggle of Algeria and Morocco over "regional preeminence" of Northern Africa. Morocco views Western Sahara as a "check on Algeria's regional ambitions being pursued via Polisario surrogates."

== History ==
The United Nations became more involved with the conflict in 1976. In 1979, the Organisation of African Unity (OAU) also became involved in the Settlement Plan. The UN and the OAU introduced a plan in the late 1980s and negotiated with parties for about five years. On July 20, King Hassan of Morocco agreed to a referendum "for the self-determination" of the Western Saharan people. Once eligible voters were identified for the referendum, the people of Western Sahara would vote on whether they would be independent or become part of Morocco. The plan "was accepted in principle by Morocco and Polisario at the end of August 1988." The referendum was written up in Security Council Resolution 658. The United Nations Security Council became involved in 1991. The agreement resulted in a cease-fire between Morocco and Polisario, which went into effect on September 6, 1991. The cease-fire was treated as a separate issue from the rest of the Settlement Plan, which included voter registration for the referendum, by Pérez de Cuéllar, the current United Nations Secretary General. The referendum was written up as Security Council Resolution 690 on April 29, 1991. Resolution 690 also created the United Nations Mission for the Referendum in Western Sahara (MINURSO).

Polisario hoped that the Settlement Plan would have "an outcome similar to the Evian Accords." Polisario also supported the right of native Western Saharans to have a voice in the future of the territory. The referendum was then supposed take place in 1992, but this never happened, as both parties did not agree over who should be allowed to vote on Western Saharan independence. The UN reported that the Settlement Plan had become a "zero-sum game" where each side felt that winning was paramount and both felt the stakes for losing were high. Each group only cooperated when they felt that they would be able to achieve an outcome desirable to them.

Part of the problem with voter registration was a lack of agreement between Polisario and Morocco over who could claim Sahrawi ethnicity and who should be allowed to vote on the referendum. Morocco interpreted a December 1991 broadening of the voter eligibility criteria "as a license to submit applications on behalf of individuals with questionable ties to the Western Sahara." In addition, Morocco may have "improperly influenced Sahrawi tribal leaders who live in the Moroccan-controlled Western Sahara." The UN moved 373 peacekeepers into the area to help validate Western Saharan voters. Polisario believed that Morocco was identifying tribal groups as voters who did not have a close connection to Western Sahara. During this time, King Hassan also moved 37,000 people from Morocco into Western Sahara to act as potential voters, which "infuriated Polisario and shocked the peacekeepers." Polisario believed that limiting voters to those were listed as "Western Saharan" on the 1974 Spanish census would lead to a vote for independence and did not want additional voters identified.

During the voter registration process, United Nations personnel faced further difficulties in deploying MINURSO peacekeepers from Morocco and the Moroccan government forbid Western Saharans from making contact with any foreign person. Polisario also interrupted the voter identification process, during which they questioned the integrity of MINURSO. The process stalled in 1995, during which the United Nations Security Council was sent to assess the situation, the consequences of which raised the stakes of the process for all parties involved. By 1996, recommendations for complete withdrawal of peacekeepers and the suspension of the voter registration process were called for by the UN Secretary General. In 1996, Eric Jensen, the Acting Special Representative, attempted to renegotiate the process, with little success.

In 1997, former United States Secretary of State, James Baker, was appointed as a UN envoy by new UN Secretary General, Kofi Annan. The initial peace talks left many people in the area hopeful. First Baker reviewed the prior proposals and consulted with all parties involved. He, along with Chester A. Crocker and John R. Bolton, conducted private talks with Polisario and Morocco along with Algeria and Mauritania acting as observers. Eventually, the talks, which covered the "issues of refugees, reduction of Moroccan troops, prisoners of war and political prisoners," along with an agreement on a code of conduct for the voter registration, eventually led to the Houston Agreement. Voter identification began again on December 3, 1997. A referendum was meant to occur by 1998. However, due to Morocco's refusal to accept the census results, and thus unlikelihood of accepting referendum based on the voters proposed, the UN Secretary General suspended the Settlement Plan.

In 1999, King Hassan died and Mohammed VI took over. King Mohammed "strongly reasserted Morocco's claim to the region." Also in 1999, Abdelaziz Bouteflika, who supported the independence of Western Sahara, became president of Algeria.

== After the Settlement Plan ==
Other solutions were sought by the UN Secretary-General's Special Envoy James Baker in 2001, and Morocco accepted these, but Algeria and the Polisario Front rejected what became known as Baker Plan I. In 2003 Baker Plan II was rejected by Morocco and accepted by Algeria and the Polisario Front. In June 2004, James Baker resigned his post as UN Envoy to Western Sahara.

In 2006, Morocco introduced a plan where the Sahrawi people could govern themselves, as long as they were under Moroccan rule. That plan was rejected.

Polisario has threatened to end the ceasefire, but without aid from Algeria, it has not done so. The ceasefire was eventually ended in 2020 after Morocco launched a military operation near Guerguerat.

== Criticism ==
Focusing mainly on self-determination for the territory may have excluded other possible solutions to the conflict. Samuel J. Spector has criticized the UN's "tendency to ignore Morocco's strategic interest in the territory and historical rights." Anna Theofilopoulou discusses how the United Nations allowed each side to erode and derail the process, rather than "developing and sticking to a strategy designed to tackle head-on the difficulties in dealing with this conflict." Michael Rubin, writing in The Journal of International Security Affairs, believes that Moroccan rule of the Sahrawi people is the best way for the area to remain stable, free from terrorism and will provide a better quality of life. Jacob A. Mundy, writing in the Mediterranean Quarterly in 2004, described how while the United Nations was attempting to avoid a conflict similar to East Timor, they instead created the setting for a very similar situation.

Human Rights Watch wrote in 1995, that both side of the conflict were creating obstacles in the process of identifying potential voters for the referendum.

In a 2006 report to the United States Congress, Carol Migdalovitz writes that without a resolution on a settlement plan for Western Sahara, diplomatic relations between Morocco and Algeria will remain strained.
