= History of Western Sahara =

The history of Western Sahara can be traced back to the times of Carthaginian explorer Hanno the Navigator in the 5th century BC. Though few historical records are left from that period, Western Sahara's modern history has its roots linked to some nomadic groups (living under Berber tribal rule and in contact with the Roman Empire) such as the Sanhaja group, and the introduction of Islam and the Arabic language at the end of the 8th century AD.

Western Sahara has never been a nation in the modern sense of the word. It was home to Phoenician colonies, but those disappeared with virtually no trace. Islam arrived there in the 8th century, but the region, beset with desertification, remained little developed. From the 11th to the 19th centuries, Western Sahara was one of the links between the sub-Saharan and North African regions. During the 11th century, the Sanhaja tribal confederation allied with the Lamtuna tribe to found the Almoravid dynasty. The conquests of the Almoravids extended over present-day Morocco, Western Algeria, and the Iberian Peninsula to the north and Mauritania and Mali to the south, reaching the Ghana Empire. By the 16th century, the Arab Saadi dynasty conquered the Songhai Empire based on the Niger River. Some Trans-Saharan trade routes also traversed Western Sahara.

In 1884, Spain claimed a protectorate over the coast from Cape Bojador to Cape Blanc, and the area was later extended. In 1958, Spain combined separate districts together to form the province of Spanish Sahara.

A 1975 advisory opinion by the International Court of Justice on the status of the Western Sahara held that while some of the region's tribes had historical ties to Morocco, they were insufficient to establish "any tie of territorial sovereignty" between the Western Sahara and the Kingdom of Morocco. In November of that year, the Green March into Western Sahara began when 350,000 unarmed Moroccans, accompanied by the Moroccan Army armed with heavy weapons, converged on the southern city of Tarfaya and waited for a signal from King Hassan II of Morocco to cross into Western Sahara. As a result of pressure from France, the US, and the UK, Spain abandoned Western Sahara on November 14, 1975, going so far as to even exhume Spanish corpses from cemeteries. Morocco later virtually annexed the northern two-thirds of Western Sahara in 1976, and the rest of the territory in 1979, following Mauritania's withdrawal.

On February 27, 1976, the Polisario Front formally proclaimed the Sahrawi Arab Democratic Republic and set up a government in exile, initiating a guerrilla war between the Polisario and Morocco, which continued until a 1991 cease-fire. As part of the 1991 peace accords, a referendum was to be held among indigenous people, giving them the option between independence or inclusion within Morocco. To date the referendum has never been held because of questions over who is eligible to vote.

== Ancient and classical antiquity ==
Phoenician/Carthaginian colonies established or reinforced by Hanno the Navigator in the 5th century BC have vanished with virtually no trace. The desertification of the Sahara during the "transitional arid phase" ca. 300 BC - 300 AD" made contact with some parts with the outside world very difficult before the introduction of the camel into these areas, from the third century of the Christian era on.

=== Contacts with Roman Empire ===
Plinius wrote that the coastal area north of the river Senegal and south of the Atlas Mountains was populated, during Augustus times, by the Pharusii and Perorsi,

In the year 41 AD Suetonius Paullinus, afterwards Consul, was the first of the Romans who led an army across Mount Atlas. At the end of a ten days' march he reached the summit,—which even in summer was covered with snow,—and from thence, after passing a desert of black sand and burnt rocks, he arrived at a river called Gerj...he then penetrated into the country of the Canarii and Perorsi, the former of whom inhabited a woody region abounding in elephants and serpents, and the latter were Ethiopians, not far distant from the Pharusii and the river Daras (modern river Senegal).

What is now Western Sahara was a dry savanna area during classical antiquity, where independent tribes like the Pharusii and the Perorsi led a semi-nomadic life facing growing desertification.

Romans made explorations toward this area and probably reached, with Suetonius Paulinus, the area of Adrar. There is evidence (e.g., coins, fibulas) of Roman commerce in Akjoujt and Tamkartkart near Tichit.

The western Sahara population (in those first centuries of the Roman Empire) consisted of nomads (mainly of the Sanhaja tribal confederation) in the plains and sedentary populations in river valleys, in oases, and in towns like Awdaghust, Tichitt, Oualata, Taghaza, Timbuktu, Awlil, Azuki, and Tamdult.

Some Berber tribes moved to Mauritania in the third and fourth century, and after the 13th century some Arabs entered the region as conquerors.

== Islamic era ==
Islam arrived in the 8th century AD between the Berber population who inhabited the western part of the Sahara. The Islamic faith quickly expanded, brought by Arab immigrants, who initially only blended superficially with the population, mostly confining themselves to the cities of present-day Morocco and Spain.

The Berbers increasingly used the traditional trade routes of the Sahara. Caravans transported salt, gold and slaves between North Africa and West Africa, and the control of trade routes became a major ingredient in the constant power struggle between various tribes. On more than one occasion, the Berber tribes of the Western Sahara would unite behind religious leaders to sweep the ruling leaders from power, sometimes founding dynasties of their own. This was the case with the Almoravids and Al-Andalus, and was also the case with the jihad of Nasir al-Din in the 17th century and the later Qadiriyyah movement of the Kunta in the 18th century.

== Zawiyas ==
An important role was played by the zawiyas. These zawiya tribes became the tribes of the teachers, specialists of religion, law and education.

== Arabization of the mujahideen (13th and 14th century) ==
In the 13th and 14th century, these tribes migrated westwards along the Sahara's northern border to settle in the Fezzan (Libya), Ifriqiya (Tunisia), Tlemcen (Algeria), Jebel Saghro (Morocco), and Saguia el-Hamra (Western Sahara).

Ouadane, Idjil (near Atar), Azougui, Araouane, Taoudenni, and later Tindouf were important stopping-places. At the same time, the number of slaves kept in Western Sahara itself increased drastically.

The Maqil tribes, who entered the domains of the Sanhaja Berber tribe, sometimes intermarried with the Berber population; the Arabo-Berber people of the region are now known as Saharawi. An exonym sometimes used to describe the Banu Hassan tribes of present-day of the region was Moors. The Arabic dialect, Hassaniya, became the dominant mother-tongue of the Western Sahara and Mauritania. Berber vocabulary and cultural traits remain common, despite the fact that many Saharawi people today claim Arab ancestry.

== Colonial era (1884–1975) ==
Map showing claims to Africa in 1913, Spanish colonies, including Western Sahara, are colored violet

Western Sahara came under Spanish rule, despite attempts by the Moroccan sultan Hassan I to repel the European incursions on the territory in 1886. The oases of Tuat in the south-east went to the immense territory of the French Sahara. In 1898, in the aftermath of the Spanish–American War, Spain attempted to sell Spanish Sahara to Austria-Hungary; Spain wished to recoup its losses from the conflict and several Austrian ministers wished to obtain an overseas colony to justify naval expansion. However, as Austria-Hungary operated as a dual monarchy with Austria and Hungary having joint control over financial and foreign policy matters, the Hungarian House of Magnates vetoed the purchase and the colony was retained by Spain.

=== Sahrawi tribes ===
The modern ethnic group is thus an Arabized Berber people inhabiting the westernmost Sahara desert, in the area of modern Mauritania, Morocco, Algeria and most notably the Western Sahara, with some tribes traditionally migrating into northern Mali and Niger. As with most Saharan peoples, the tribes reflect a highly mixed heritage, combining Arab, Berber, and other influences, including black African ethnic and cultural characteristics.

In pre-colonial times, the tribal areas of the Sahara desert was generally considered bled es-Siba or "the land of dissidence" by the authorities of the established Islamic states of North Africa, such as the Sultan of Morocco and the Deys of Algeria. The Islamic governments of the pre-colonial sub-Saharan empires of Mali and Songhai appear to have had a similar relationship with these territories, which were at once the home of undisciplined raiding tribes and the main trade route for the Saharan caravan trade. Central governments had little control over the region, although some Hassaniya tribes would occasionally extended "beya" or allegiance to prestigious neighbouring rulers, to gain their political backing or, in some cases, as a religious ceremony.

Best reference on Sahrawi population ethnography in the Spanish colonial era is the work of Spanish anthropologist Julio Caro Baroja, who in 1952–53 spent several months among native tribes all along the then Spanish Sahara.

=== Spanish Sahara ===
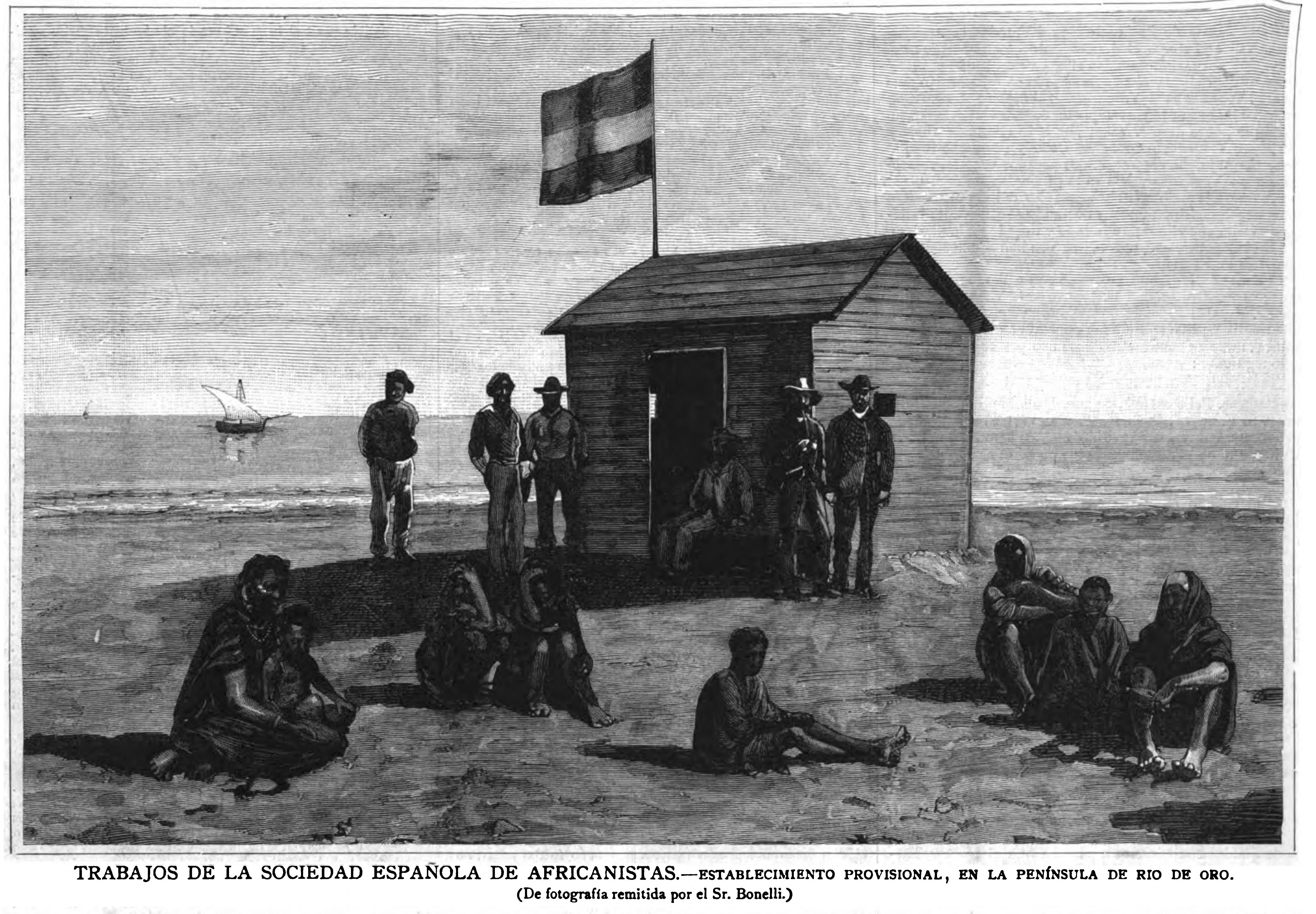
Engraving depicting the Sociedad Española de Africanistas' exploratory works in the Río de Oro Peninsula led by Emilio Bonelli (published in January 1885 in La Ilustración Española y Americana).

In 1884, Spain claimed a protectorate over the coast from Cape Bojador to Cap Blanc. Later, the Spanish extended their area of control. In 1958 Spain joined the previously separate districts of Saguia el-Hamra (in the north) and Río de Oro (in the south) to form the province of Spanish Sahara.

Raids and rebellions by the Sahrawi population long kept the Spanish forces out of much of the territory. Ma al-Aynayn started an uprising against the French in the 1910s, at a time when France had expanded its influence and control in North-West Africa. French forces finally defeated him when he tried to conquer Marrakesh, but his sons and followers figured prominently in several rebellions which followed. Not until the second destruction of Smara in 1934, by joint Spanish and French forces, did the territory finally become subdued. Another uprising in 1956–1958, initiated by the Moroccan Army of Liberation, led to heavy fighting, but eventually the Spanish forces regained control - again with French aid. However, unrest simmered, and in 1967 the Harakat Tahrir arose to challenge Spanish rule peacefully. After the events of the Zemla Intifada in 1970, when Spanish police destroyed the organization and "disappeared" its founder, Muhammad Bassiri, anti-Spanish feeling or Sahrawi nationalism again took a militant turn.

== Western Sahara conflict ==
From 1973 the colonizers gradually lost control over the countryside to the armed guerrillas of the Polisario Front, a nationalist organization. Successive Spanish attempts to form loyal Sahrawi political institutions (such as the Djema'a -many members of the Yemaa are today in Polisario Movement- and the PUNS party) to support its rule, and draw activists away from the radical nationalists, failed. As the health of the Spanish leader Francisco Franco deteriorated, the Madrid government slipped into disarray, and sought a way out of the Sahara conflict. The fall in 1974 of the Portuguese Estado Novo-government after unpopular wars in its own African provinces seems to have hastened the decision to pull out.

== Armed conflict (1975–1991) ==
In late 1975, Spain held meetings with Polisario leader El-Ouali, to negotiate the terms for a handover of power. But at the same time, Morocco and Mauritania began to put pressure on the Franco government: both countries argued that Spanish Sahara formed a historical part of their own territories. The United Nations became involved after Morocco asked for an opinion on the legality of its demands from the International Court of Justice (ICJ), and the UN also sent a visiting mission to examine the wishes of the population. The visiting mission returned its report on October 15, announcing "an overwhelming consensus" in favor of independence (as opposed to integration with Morocco or with Mauritania, or continued rule by Spain). The mission, headed by Simeon Aké, also declared that the Polisario Front seemed the main Sahrawi organization of the territory - the only rival arrangements to what the mission described as Polisario's "mass demonstrations" came from the PUNS, which by this time also advocated independence. Polisario then made further diplomatic gains by ensuring the backing of the main Sahrawi tribes and of a number of formerly pro-Spanish Djema'a elders at the Ain Ben Tili conference of October 12.

On October 16, the ICJ delivered its verdict. To the dismay of both the Rabat and Nouakchott governments, the court found with a clear majority, that the historical ties of these countries to Spanish Sahara did not grant them the right to the territory. Furthermore, the Court declared that the concept of terra nullius (un-owned land) did not apply to the territory. The Court declared that the Sahrawi population, as the true owners of the land, held a right of self-determination. In other words, any proposed solution to the situation (independence, integration etc.), had to receive the explicit acceptance of the population to gain any legal standing. Neither Morocco nor Mauritania accepted this, and on October 31, 1975, Morocco sent its army into Western Sahara to attack Polisario positions. The public diplomacy between Spain and Morocco continued, however, with Morocco demanding bilateral negotiations over the fate of the territory.

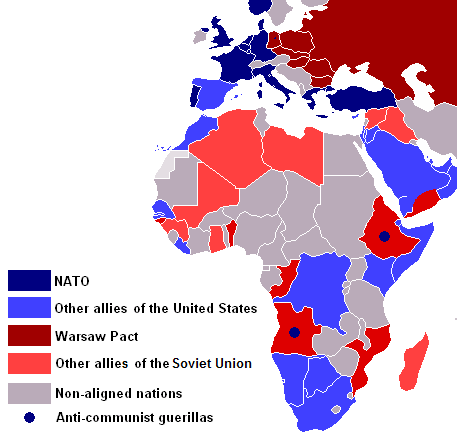
Cold War Allegiances in Africa, 1980

On November 6, 1975 Morocco launched the Green March into Western Sahara. About 350,000 unarmed Moroccans accompanied by the Moroccan Army armed with heavy weapons converged on the city of Tarfaya in southern Morocco and waited for a signal from King Hassan II of Morocco to cross into Western Sahara. As a result of international pressure, Spain acceded to Moroccan demands, and entered bilateral negotiations. This led to the Madrid Agreement and the Western Sahara partition agreement, treaties that divided the administration of the territory between Morocco and Mauritania, but did not impact the sovereignty debate. Spain, Morocco and Mauritania did not consult the Sahrawi population, and the Polisario violently opposed the treaties. The developments chance in the region until the 1990s were strongly influenced by the power struggle of the Cold War. Algeria, Libya and Mali were allied to the Eastern bloc. Morocco was the only African country in the region that was allied to the West.

Algeria gave help to the Movimiento de Liberación del Sahara, that in the late 1960s and early 1970s formed a section of new split youngs. The majority of the Sahrawi people supported its patriotic actions and identified with this movement, which later was called Polisario, and gradually had more misunderstandings with the Autonomous and Central Government of the Metropoli for the signs of a vacilante, or feeble foreign policy, made up by generals that had the "última palabra" or "last word", feeling a possible betrayal of the Motherland.

On November 14, 1975, Spain, Morocco and Mauritania signed the Madrid Accords, hence setting up a timetable for the retrieval of Spanish forces and ending Spanish occupation of Western Sahara. These accords were signed by the three parties in accordance with all international standards. In these accords, Morocco was set to annex back 2/3 of the northern part of Western Sahara, whereas the lower third would be given to Mauritania. Polisario established their own Sahrawi Arab Democratic Republic, and combined guerrilla warfare with their conventional military forces, the Sahrawi People's Liberation Army (SPLA).

On February 26, 1976 Spain's formal mandate over the territory ended when it handed administrative power on to Morocco in a ceremony in Laayoune. The day after, the Polisario proclaimed in Bir Lehlou the Sahrawi Arab Democratic Republic (SADR) as a government in exile. Mauritania in its turn renamed the southern parts of Río de Oro as Tiris al-Gharbiyya, but proved unable to maintain control over the territory. Polisario made the weak Mauritanian army its main target, and after a bold raid on the Mauritanian capital Nouakchott (where a gunshot killed El-Ouali, the first president of the SADR), Mauritania succumbed to internal unrest. The presence of a large number of Sahrawi nationalists among the country's dominant Moorish population made the Mauritanian government's position yet more fragile, and thousands of Mauritanian Sahrawis defected to Polisario. In 1978 the army seized control of the Mauritanian government and Polisario declared a cease-fire, on the assumption that Mauritania would withdraw unconditionally. This eventually occurred in 1979, as Mauritania's new rulers agreed to surrender all claims and to recognize the SADR. Following Mauritania's withdrawal, however, Morocco extended its control to the rest of the territory, and the war continued.

Through the 1980s, the war stalemated through the construction of a desert sand berm, the Moroccan Wall. Sporadic fighting continued, and Morocco faced heavy burdens due to the economic costs of its massive troop deployments along the Wall. To some extent aid sent by Saudi Arabia, France and by the USA relieved the situation in Morocco, but matters gradually became unsustainable for all parties involved.

=== Cease-fire ===
In 1991, Morocco and the Polisario Front agreed on a UN-backed cease-fire in the Settlement Plan. This plan, its further detail fleshed out in the 1997 Houston Agreement, hinged upon Morocco's agreement to a referendum on independence or unification with Morocco voted on by the Sahrawi population. The plan intended this referendum to constitute their exercise of self-determination, thereby completing the territory's yet unfinished process of decolonization. The UN dispatched a peace-keeping mission, the MINURSO, to oversee the cease-fire and make arrangements for the vote. Initially scheduled for 1992, the referendum has not taken place, due to the conflict over who has the right to vote.

Two subsequent attempts to resolve the problem by means of a negotiated political settlement by James Baker, acting as Personal Envoy of the UN Secretary General, the first in 2000 and the second in 2003, failed to gain acceptance, the first being rejected by the Polisario and second by Morocco. Both attempts, the first referred to as "The Framework Agreement" and the second commonly referred to as "The Peace Plan", contained the proposal of autonomy for the region under Moroccan sovereignty as core elements of the plans. Failure to gain acceptance by the parties to either proposal was a result of what each of the parties viewed as fundamental flaws in the respective proposals.

The Framework Agreement would have required the parties to agree on the specific terms of a political settlement based on the Autonomy/Sovereignty formula through direct negotiations. Baker presented the Peace Plan as a non-negotiable package that would have obliged each of the parties to accept its terms without further amendment. Both proposals contained elements that would have required popular endorsement of the solution through a referendum of the concerned populations. The UN Security Council declined to formally endorse either of the two proposals, which led eventually to Baker's resignation as Personal Envoy.

The prolonged cease-fire has held without major disturbances, but Polisario has repeatedly threatened to resume fighting if no breakthrough occurs. Morocco's withdrawal from both the terms of the original Settlement Plan and the Baker Plan negotiations in 2003 left the peace-keeping mission without a political agenda, which further increased the risks of renewed war.

Meanwhile, the gradual liberalization of political life in Morocco during the 1990s belatedly reached Western Sahara around 2000. This spurred political protest, as former "disappeared" and other human rights-campaigners began holding illegal demonstrations against Moroccan rule. The subsequent crackdowns and arrests drew media attention to the Moroccan occupation, and Sahrawi nationalists seized on the opportunity: in May 2005, a wave of demonstrations subsequently dubbed by the Independence Intifada by Polisario supporters, broke out. These demonstrations, which continued into the following year, were the most intense in years, and engendered a new wave of interest in the conflict, as well as new fears of instability. Polisario demanded international intervention but declared that it could not stand idly by if the "escalation of repression" continued.

In 2007, Morocco requested U.N. action against a congress to be held by the Polisario Front in Tifariti from December 14 to December 16. Morocco claimed Tifariti was part of a buffer zone and holding the congress there violated a cease-fire between the two parties. Additionally, the Polisario Front had been reported as planning a vote on a proposal for making preparations for war; if passed, it would have been the first time in 16 years preparations for war had been part of the Polisario's strategy.

In October 2010, Gadaym Izik camp was set up near Laayoune as a protest by displaced Sahrawi people about their living conditions. It was home to more than 12,000 people. In November 2010, Moroccan security forces entered Gadaym Izik camp in the early hours of the morning, using helicopters and water cannons to force people to leave. The Polisario Front said Moroccan security forces had killed a 26-year-old protester at the camp, a claim denied by Morocco. Protesters in Laayoune threw stones at police and set fire to tires and vehicles. Several buildings, including a TV station, were also set afire. Moroccan officials said five security personnel had been killed in the unrest.

In 2020, the Polisario Front brought legal action against New Zealand's superannuation fund for accepting "blood phosphate" from the occupied region. In November a brief conflict broke out near the Southern village of Guerguerat, with Morocco claiming to want to end a blockade of a road to Mauritania, and to pave that road.

== See also ==
- Ali Salem Tamek
- Almoravids
- Berlin Conference
- Brahim Dahane
- James Riley (Captain)
- João Fernandes (explorer)
- Mohamed Daddach
- Mohamed Elmoutaoikil
- Sahrawi (disambiguation)
- Scramble for Africa
- Spanish Sahara
- Western Saharan cuisine

== Bibliography ==
- Aguirre, Diego; Ramón, José (1987). Historia del Sahara Español. La verdad de una traición (in Spanish). Madrid: Kaydeda.
- "Chronology of Spanish Sahara". Balagan.org.uk. Archived from the original on 2006-10-07.
- Hodges, Tony (1983). Western Sahara: Roots of a Desert War. L. Hill. ISBN 0-88208-152-7.
- János, Besenyő (20 August 2009). Western Sahara. Besenyő János. ISBN 978-963-88332-0-4.
- Jensen, Erik (2005). Western Sahara: Anatomy of a Stalemate. Lynne Rienner Publishers. ISBN 1-58826-305-3.
- King, Dean (2004). Skeletons on the Zahara: A True Story of Survival. Little, Brown. ISBN 978-0-316-83514-5.
- McIntosh, Roderick J. (1998). "Chapter 2". The Peoples of the Middle Niger. Oxford.
- Mercer, J. (1976). Spanish Sahara. London: George, Allen & Unwin.
- Mundy, Jacob (September 2006). "Neutrality or complicity? The United States and the 1975 takeover of the Spanish Sahara". Journal of North African Studies (3): 275–306. doi:10.1080/13629380600803001. S2CID 145455013.
- Shelley, Toby (6 November 2004). Endgame in the Western Sahara: What Future for Africa's Last Colony?. Zed Books. ISBN 1-84277-341-0.
- Sipe, Lynn F. (1984). Western Sahara: A Comprehensive Bibliography. New York: Garland Publ. ISBN 978-0-8240-9125-5.
- "Thematic bibliography: general: The question of Western Sahara". Arso.org.
