= Sidi Hamdi Ould Errachid =

Moroccan politician

- سيدي حمدي ولد الرشيد
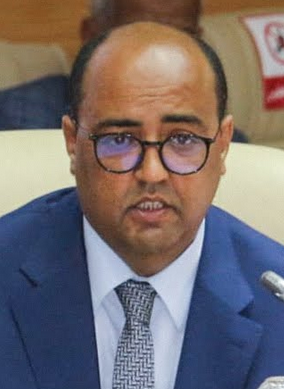
- Ould Errachid in 2020

President of the Laâyoune-Sakia El Hamra regional council
- Incumbent
- Assumed office September 14, 2015
- Monarch: Mohammed VI

Personal details
- Born: 1971 (age 54–55) Laayoune, Spanish Sahara
- Party: Istiqlal Party
- Children: 3

Sidi Hamdi Ould Errachid (Arabic: سيدي حمدي ولد الرشيد; born 1971) is a Moroccan Sahrawi politician who is currently serving as the president of the Laâyoune-Sakia El Hamra regional council since 2015 under the banner of the Istiqlal Party.

He is a member of the Royal Advisory Council for Saharan Affairs, the direction bureau of the Association of Moroccan Regions and the Laayoune Agricultural Chamber. Ould Errachid also presides over multiple associations in the region.

== Early life and education ==
Sidi Hamdi Ould Errachid was born in 1971 within the Reguibat tribe in Laayoune and obtained a university degree. He is the nephew of Moulay Hamdi Ould Errachid, mayor of Laayoune.

== Career and views ==
Ould Errachid became the president of the Laâyoune-Boujdour-Sakia El Hamra regional council in 2006 and was re-elected in 2012. In 2015, following a restructuring of Moroccan regions, he was elected president of the Laâyoune-Sakia El Hamra regional council and was re-elected in 2021. Following his re-election, he expressed the regional council's aspirations to implement Morocco's New Development Model for the Southern Provinces. In 2018, he undertook a leading role in organizing a Morocco-France Business Forum in Laayoune.

Ould Errachid participated with a Moroccan delegation in two round tables on the Western Sahara conflict, held in December 2018 and March 2019 in Geneva at the initiative of the former Personal Envoy of the UN Secretary General, Horst Köhler, where they discussed regional integration and the political process in the Sahara. He applauded the United States' recognition of Moroccan sovereignty over Western Sahara, stating that "all Moroccan citizens of Sahrawi origin applaud the historic decision of the United States".

In 2020, he announced the opening of polytechnic faculties in Boujdour and Tarfaya as part of the creation of a university core in the Laâyoune-Sakia El Hamra region. During the COVID-19 pandemic, Ould Errachid invested in human resources at the Laâyoune regional hospital, with the regional council pledging 20 million dirham for the fight against the coronavirus. In 2022, he presided over the implementation of the ESRI-2030 pact in the region, focused on improving university centers in the region with international standards.
