= Laâyoune-Boujdour-Sakia El Hamra =

Laâyoune-Boujdour-Sakia El Hamra العيون بوجدور الساقية الحمراء
- Region
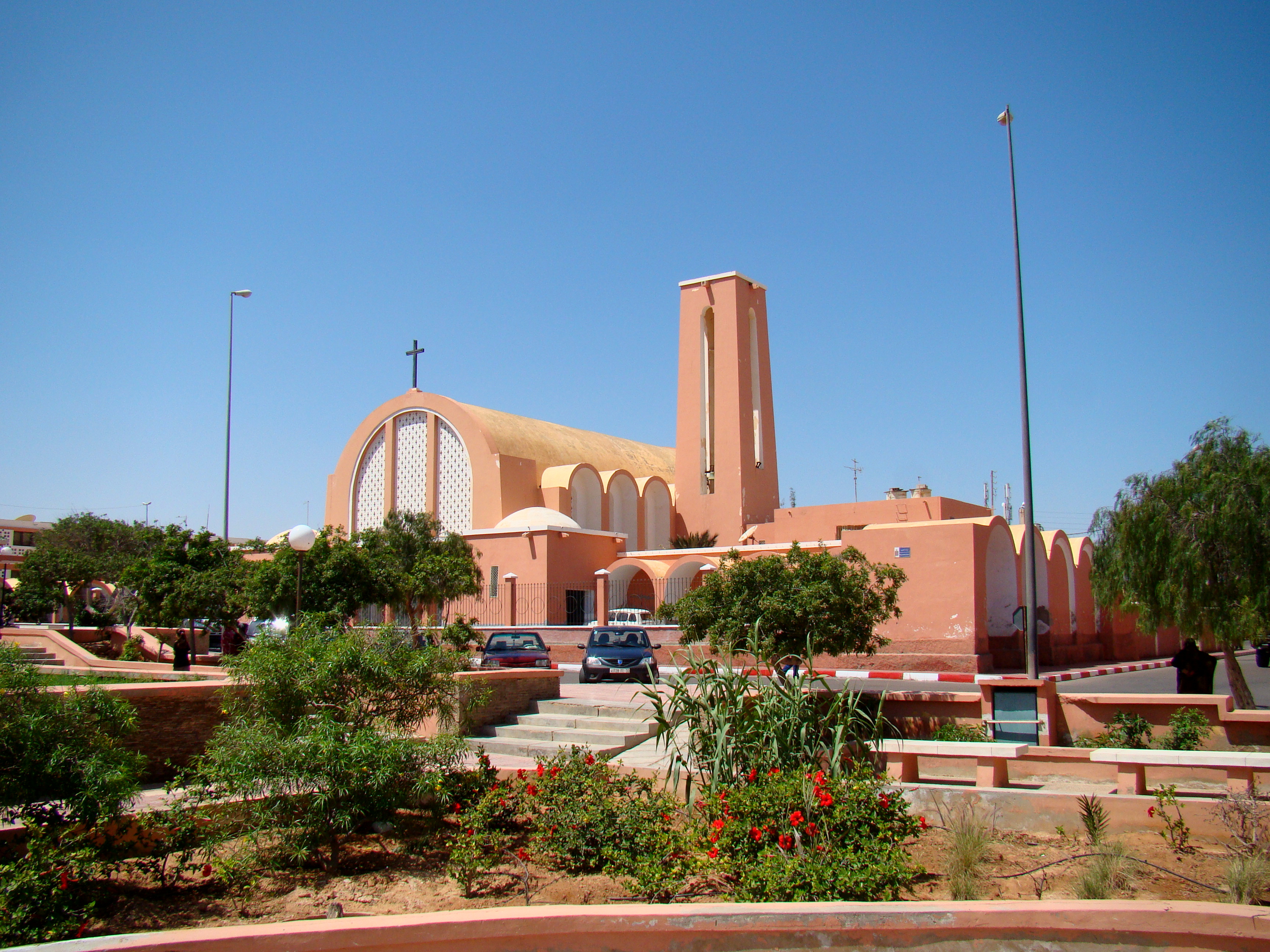
- The cathedral of Laayoune, the regional capital and largest settlement.

- Location in Morocco
- Coordinates: 26°08′N 14°30′W
- Country: Morocco; Sahrawi Arab Democratic Republic
- Created: 1997
- Abolished: September 2015
- Capital: Laayoune

Area
  - Total: 139,480 km^{2} (53,850 sq mi)

Population (2014)
  - Total: 301,744
  - Density: 2.1633/km^{2} (5.6030/sq mi)
- Time zone: UTC+1 (CET)

Laâyoune-Boujdour-Sakia El Hamra (Arabic: العيون بوجدور الساقية الحمراء) was one of the sixteen regions of Morocco from 1997 to 2015. It was mainly located in the disputed territory of Western Sahara, covered an area of 139,480 square kilometres (53,850 sq mi) and had a population of 301,744 as of the 2004 census. Its capital was Laayoune. In September 2015, the region was combined with Es-Semara Province in Guelmim-Es Semara to form the new region of Laâyoune-Sakia El Hamra.

== Geography ==
The region was bordered to the east by the region of Guelmim-Es Semara. To the south was the region of Oued Ed-Dahab-Lagouira, entirely within the Western Sahara. The east of the region bordered the Mauritanian region of Tiris Zemmour. Laâyoune-Boujdour-Sakia El Hamra had a coastline on the Atlantic Ocean, facing the Spanish Canary Islands.

The region consisted of the following provinces:

- Boujdour Province
- Laâyoune Province
- Tarfaya Province

== Municipalities by population (2004 census) ==
The capital Laayoune contained 73% of the region's population. Of the four municipalities, only Tarfaya was outside the disputed area.

- Laayoune, Laâyoune Province: 179,542
- Boujdour, Boujdour Province: 36,731
- El Marsa, Laâyoune Province: 10,229
- Tarfaya, Tarfaya Province: 5,615
