= Bou Craa =

Bou Craa بوكراع (Hassaniyya) ⴱⵓⴽⵔⴰⵄ (Berber languages) Bucraa
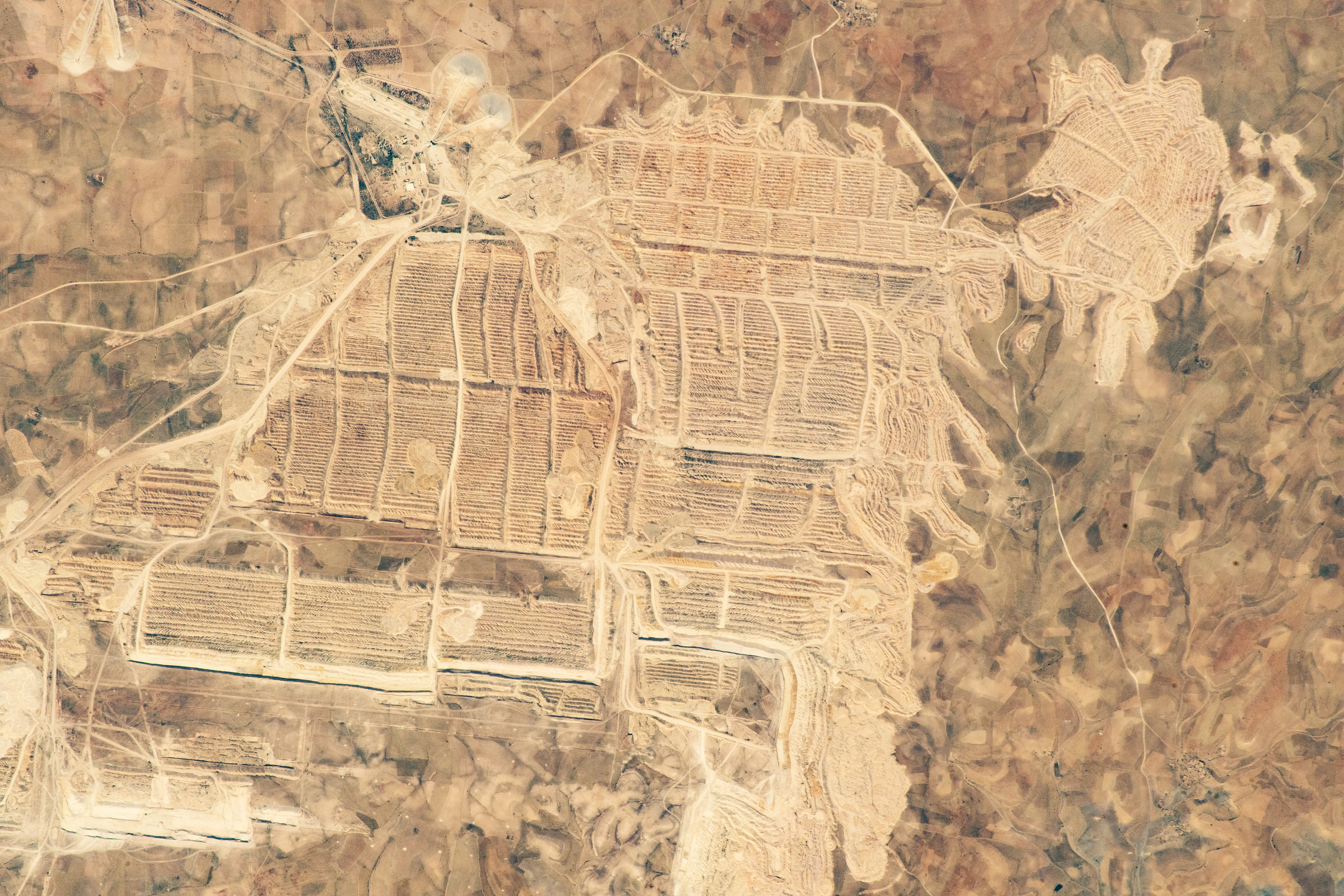
- View of Bou Craa phosphate mine from space, taken in 2018

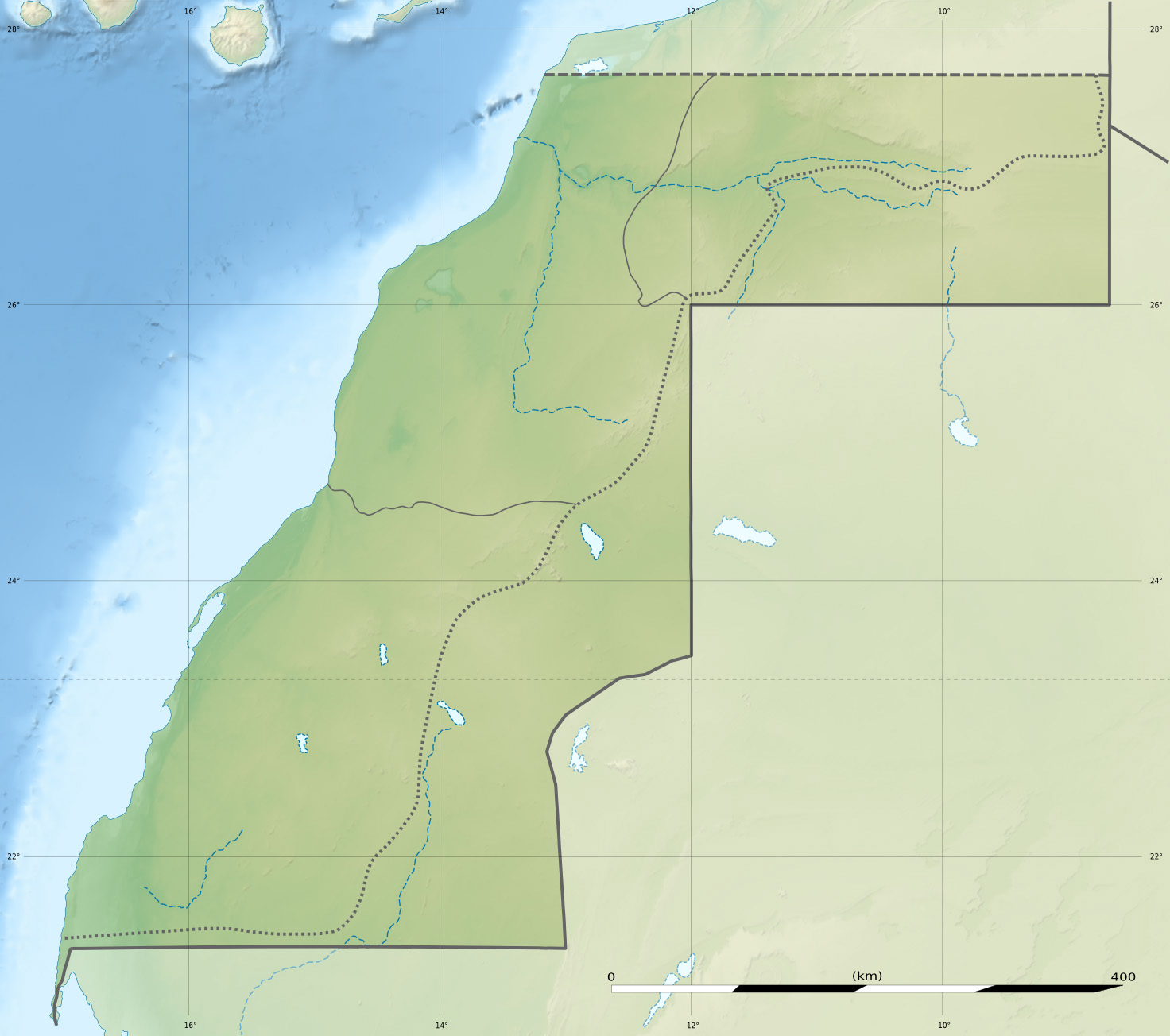
- Location in Western Sahara Bou Craa (Africa)
- Coordinates: 26°19′22″N 12°50′59″W
- Non-Self-Governing Territory: Western Sahara
- Region: Laâyoune-Sakia El Hamra
- Province: Laâyoune
- Claimed by: Kingdom of Morocco; Sahrawi Arab Democratic Republic
- Controlled by: Kingdom of Morocco

Area
  - Total: 211.62 km^{2} (81.71 sq mi)

Population (2004)
  - Total: 2,519 (Note: According to Morocco's Higher Planning Commission.)
  - Density: 11.9/km^{2} (31/sq mi)
- Time zone: UTC+0 (GMT)

Bou Craa (also transliterated as Bo Craa, Bou Cra, Bu Craa or Boukra) (Arabic: بوكراع, Berber: ⴱⵓⴽⵔⴰⵄ, Spanish: Bucraa) is a town in Moroccan-occupied Western Sahara, southeast of the main city of El Aaiún. Historically located in the Saguia el-Hamra region, Bou Craa is the site of a phosphate deposit of over 1.7 billion tons. The town is inhabited almost exclusively by employees of the mining company Phosboucraa, a subsidiary of Morocco's state-owned OCP Group.

Phosboucraa started phosphate mining in 1972. The mine produces around 3 million tonnes annually, 10% of Morocco's total production. Output material is transported to the coast by an automated conveyor belt. Approximately 100 kilometres (62 mi) long, the belt is the longest in the world and dust blown from it is visible from space.

== History ==
During the Spanish colonization of the area (see Spanish Sahara), many early recruits of Sahrawi nationalist movements such as the Movement for the Liberation of Saguia el Hamra and Wadi el Dhahab and Polisario Front were workers in the phosphate mines.

The town became part of the Moroccan-occupied zone in the April 1976 partition resulting from the Madrid Accords. It has remained in Moroccan hands, though mining was paused in 1976 as a result of Polisario guerilla attacks. During the Western Sahara War, the Polisario sabotaged and disabled the conveyor belt several times. These attacks gradually ceased in the early 1980s when the town become enclosed by the Moroccan Wall, which consolidated Moroccan occupation over the north-western part of Western Sahara (the so-called "Useful Triangle"). Mining resumed on a reduced scale in July 1982.

== Twin towns ==
- Castro Urdiales, Spain
- Llodio, Spain
