= Laayoune Province =

Area of Western Sahara

Coordinates: 27.156539°N 13.203592°W

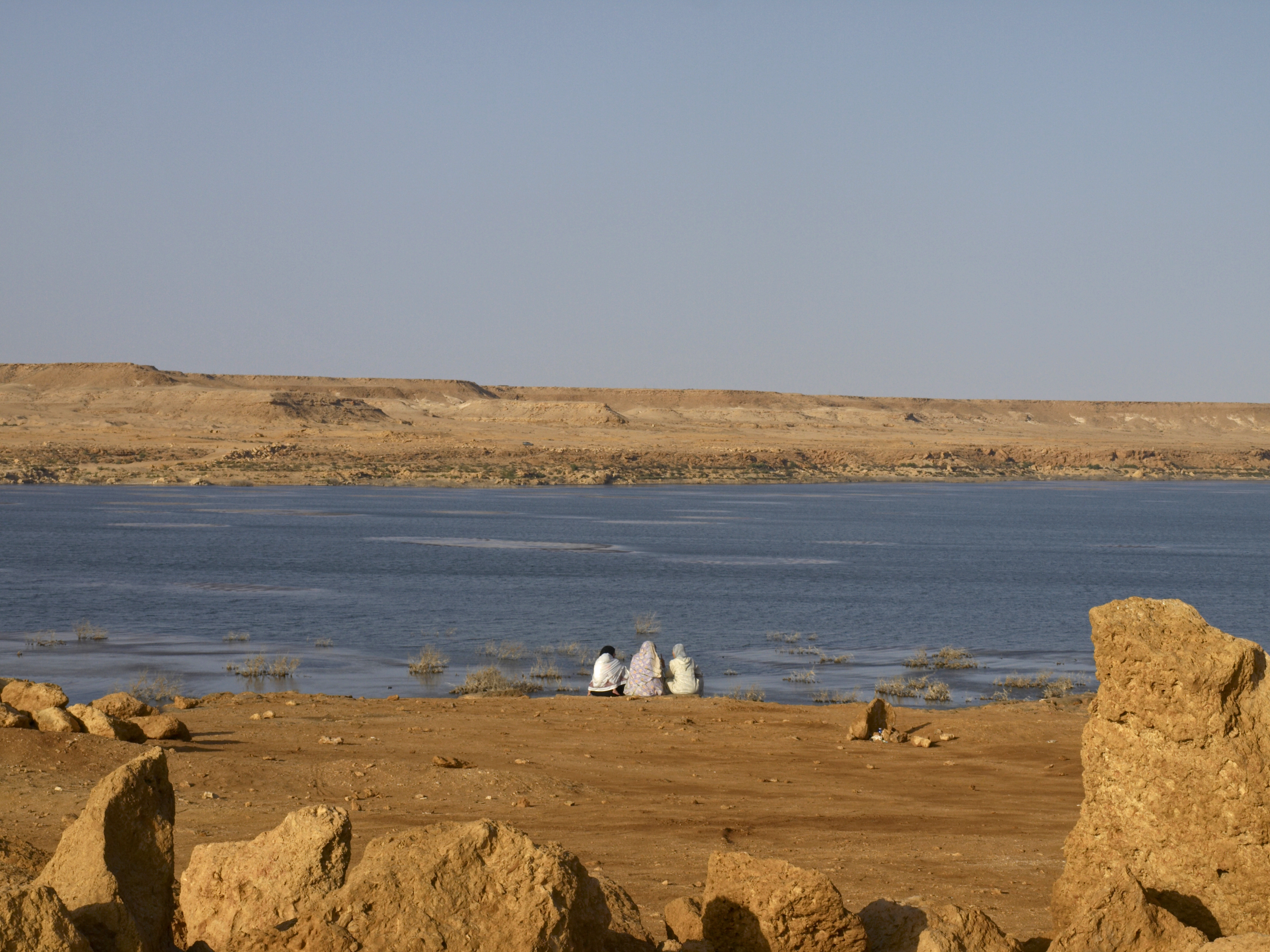
Water reservoir at the Seguiet-el-Hamra River

Laâyoune Province in Laâyoune-Sakia El Hamra

Laâyoune Province (Arabic: إقليم العيون; Spanish: Provincia de El Aaiún) is a delineated province in the north-west of the Laâyoune-Sakia El Hamra region, which is situated within the northern part of the Moroccan-occupied territory of Western Sahara. Its population in 2004 was 210,023 (when it still included the population of the new Tarfaya Province, created in 2009). In today's limits of the province the population was 199,603. Its main town is Laayoune.

== Subdivisions ==
Communes of Laâyoune Province

The province is divided administratively into the following:

Name	Geographic code	Type	Households	Population (2004)	Foreign population	Moroccan settlers	Notes
El Marsa	321.01.01.	Municipality	2850	10229	11	10218	
Laayoune	321.01.03.	Municipality	37545	183691	477	183214	
Bou Craa	321.03.01.	Rural commune	505	2519	0	2519	
Dcheira	321.03.03.	Rural commune	313	1745	1	1744	
Foum El Oued	321.03.05.	Rural commune	325	1419	14	1405	

Since 2009, the following communes have been separated into the Tarfaya Province: The municipality of Tarfaya, and the rural communes of El Hagounia, Akhfenir, Daoura, and Tah.
