= El Hagounia =

El Hagounia Hagunia
- Location in Western Sahara
- Coordinates: 27°25′35″N 12°23′31″W
- Non-self-governing territory: Western Sahara
- Claimed by: Kingdom of Morocco; Sahrawi Arab Democratic Republic
- Controlled by: Kingdom of Morocco
- Region: Laâyoune-Sakia El Hamra
- Province: Tarfaya Province

Area
  - Total: 96.8 km^{2} (37.4 sq mi)

Population (2014)
  - Total: 151
  - Density: 1.56/km^{2} (4.04/sq mi)
- Time zone: UTC+0 (GMT)

Historical population
Year	Pop.	±%
2004	1,089	—
2014	151	−86.1%

El Hagounia (Spanish: Hagunia) is a small town and rural commune in the Tarfaya Province of the Laâyoune-Sakia El Hamra region, located in the Moroccan part of Western Sahara. At the time of the 2014 census, the commune had a total population of 151 people.
