= Antonio de Oro =

Spanish military officer (1904–1940)

Colonel Antonio de Oro
- Born: Antonio de Oro Pulido; 13 April 1904; Ciempozuelos, Kingdom of Spain
- Died: 28 December 1940 (aged 36); Tetuán, Spanish Morocco
- Military career
- Allegiance: Nationalist Spain
- Branch: Spanish Army
- Rank: Lieutenant colonel
- Other work: Government delegate in Spanish Sahara (1937–1940)

Antonio de Oro Pulido (Ciempozuelos (Madrid), 13 April 1904 – Tetuán, 28 December 1940) was a Spanish military officer, explorer and colonial administrator.

== Biography ==
Oro came to the Spanish territories in Africa with the rank of captain, and eventually rose to the rank of lieutenant colonel. In 1938, he founded the city of El Aaiún, which in 1940 became the capital of Spanish Sahara. He died on 28 December 1940, from sudden sepsis.

There is a street named after him in Ciempozuelos (Calle Capitán Antonio de Oro).
