= Tah, Morocco =

Tah
- Location in Morocco Tah (Africa)
- Coordinates: 27°40′30″N 12°57′19″W
- Country: Morocco
- Region: Laâyoune-Sakia El Hamra
- Province: Tarfaya Province

Population (2014)
  - Total: 1,516
- Time zone: UTC+0 (GMT)

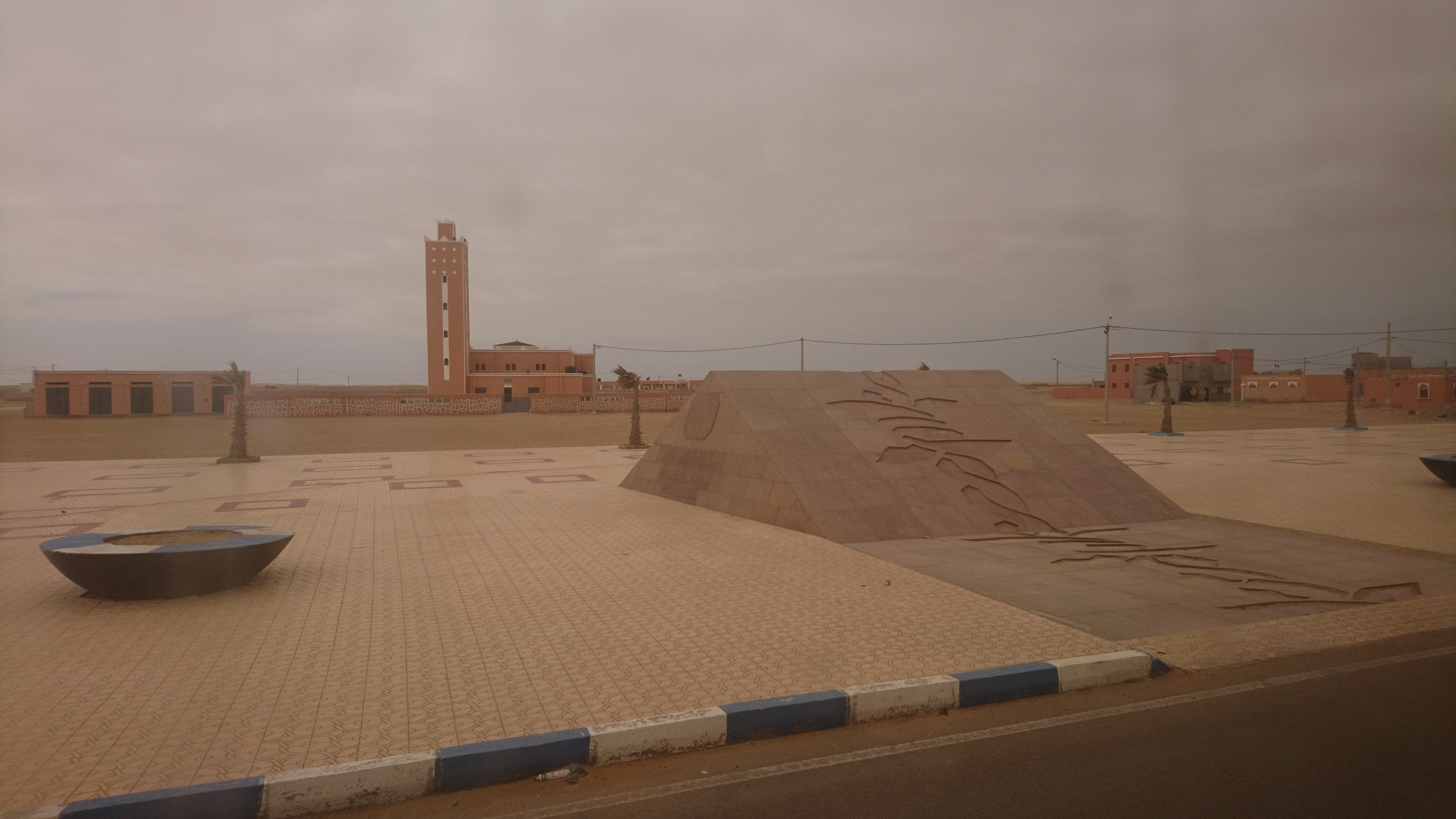
Monument in Tah to celebrate the visit of Sultan Hassan 1 to the region in 1886.

Tah is a small town and rural commune in the Tarfaya Province of the Laâyoune-Sakia El Hamra region of Morocco. At the time of the 2014 census, the commune had a total population of 1,516 people.
