= El Marsa, Western Sahara =

Settlement in Western Sahara

El Marsa
- City
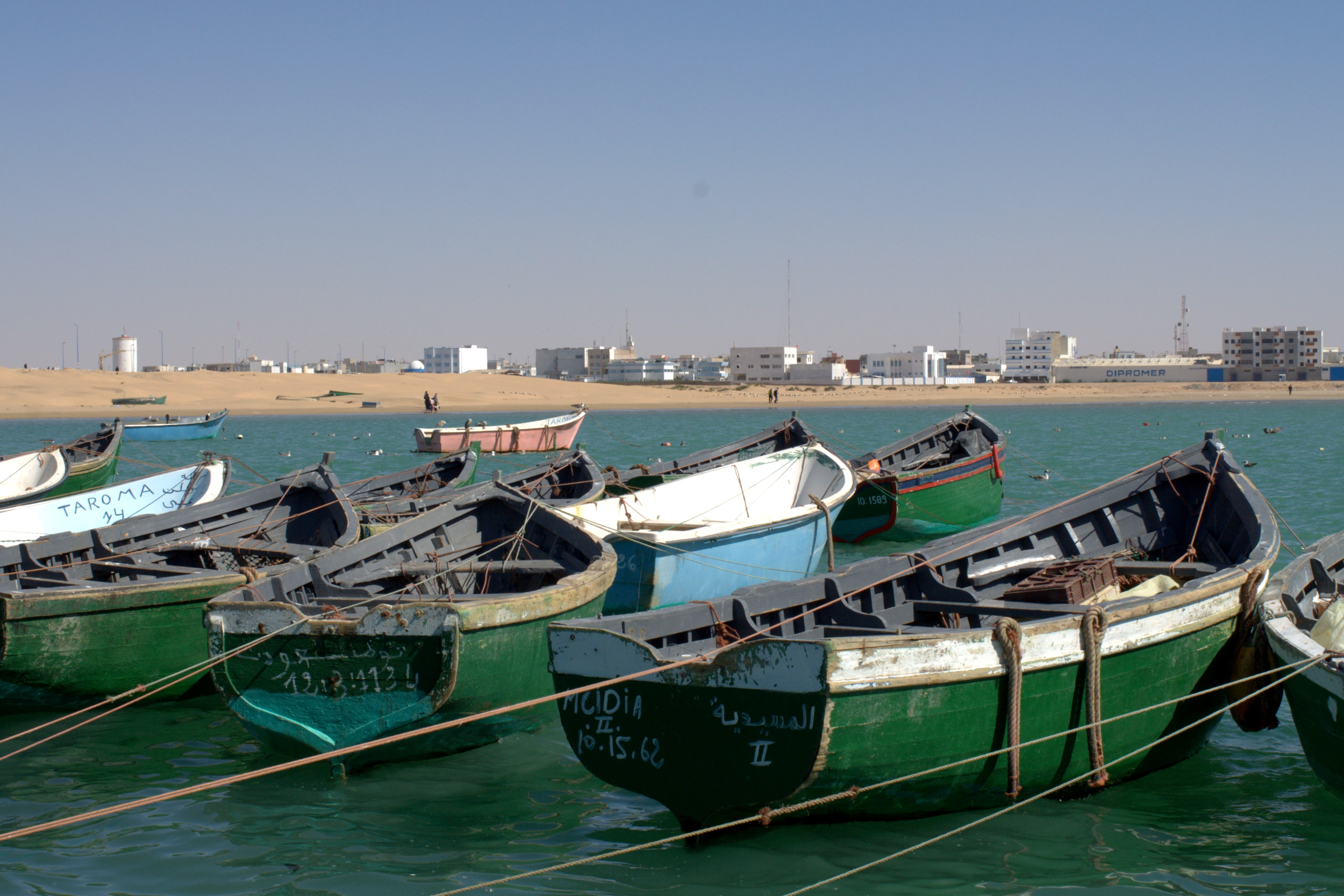
- Fishing port of El Marsa
- Interactive map of El Marsa
- Coordinates: 27°04′N 13°24′W
- Non-self-governing territory: Western Sahara
- Claimed by: Kingdom of Morocco; Sahrawi Arab Democratic Republic
- Controlled by: Kingdom of Morocco

Area
  - Total: 27.2 km^{2} (10.5 sq mi)

Population (2024)
  - Total: 28,848
  - Density: 1,060/km^{2} (2,750/sq mi)
- Time zone: UTC+0 (GMT)

Historical population
| Year | Pop. | ±% |
|---|---|---|
| 2004 | 10,229 | — |
| 2014 | 17,917 | +75.2% |
| 2024 | 28,848 | +61.0% |

El Marsa (Arabic: المرسى) is a port city in Moroccan-occupied Western Sahara.

According to the Moroccan authorities, El Marsa belongs to Laayoune Province in the region of Laâyoune-Sakia El Hamra. Its population in 2024 is 28,848, the second-largest in the province (behind the regional capital El Aaiún) and third in the region. It has a seaport on the Atlantic Ocean and therefore is also known as Laayoune Plage (El Aaiún Beach). The town also has a hospital.

El Marsa is to the west of El Aaiún, on the N1, Morocco's main highway, which also goes into the Western Sahara, where it is the last settlement south until Boujdour.
