= Daoura, Western Sahara =

Daoura
- Dora
- Location in Western Sahara
- Coordinates: 27°25′5″N 12°59′3″W
- Non-self-governing territory: Western Sahara
- Claimed by: Kingdom of Morocco; Sahrawi Arab Democratic Republic
- Controlled by: Kingdom of Morocco
- Region: Laâyoune-Sakia El Hamra
- Province: Tarfaya Province

Area
  - Total: 31.58 km^{2} (12.19 sq mi)

Population (2014)
  - Total: 1,108
  - Density: 35.09/km^{2} (90.87/sq mi)
- Time zone: UTC+0 (GMT)

Daoura is a small town and rural commune in Tarfaya Province of the Laâyoune-Sakia El Hamra region, in the Moroccan-occupied Western Sahara. At the time of the 2014 census, the commune had a total population of 1,108 people.
