= Ciempozuelos =

- Municipality
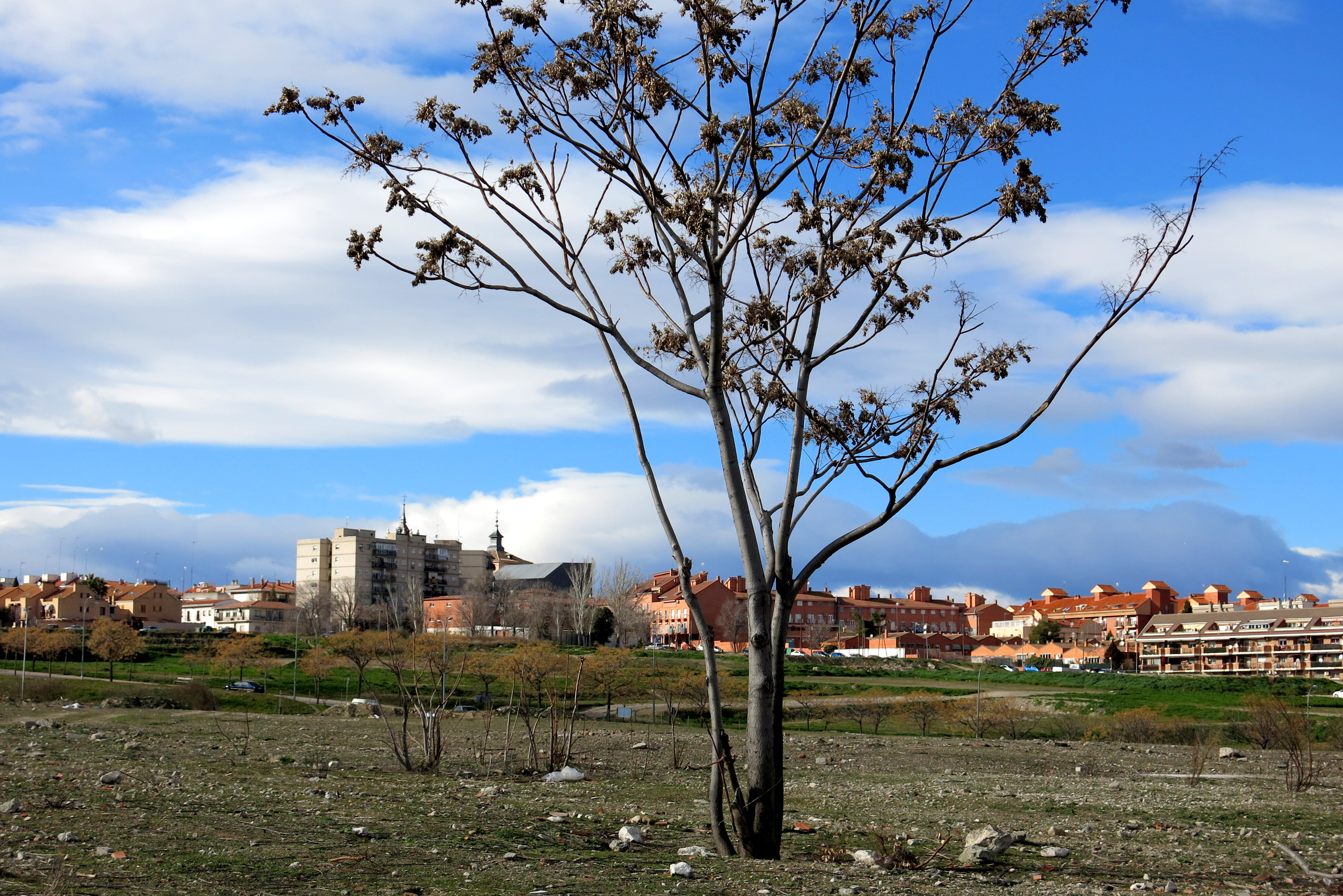

- Flag Coat of arms

- Location of Ciempozuelos in Madrid

- Location within Spain
- Coordinates: 40°09′33″N 3°37′06″W
- Country: Spain
- Autonomous community: Community of Madrid

Area
  - Total: 49.64 km^{2} (19.17 sq mi)
- Elevation: 567 m (1,860 ft)

Population (2025-01-01)
  - Total: 26,350
  - Density: 530.8/km^{2} (1,375/sq mi)
- Time zone: UTC+1 (CET)
  - Summer (DST): UTC+2 (CEST)
- Website: www.ayto-ciempozuelos.org

Ciempozuelos (Spanish: [θjempoˈθwelos]) is a municipality in Spain located in the Community of Madrid. The municipality spans across a total area of 49.64 km^{2} and, as of 1 January 2020, it has a registered population of 25,383 (2022).

== Geography ==
The municipality is located in the watershed of the Jarama, which flows through the eastern limit of the municipality.

== History ==
In the middle ages, the hamlet of Ciempozuelos belonged to the land of Segovia, included in the sexmo of Valdemoro. Since as far back as the 14th century, underground water caves were the main source of water.

The etymology of the name Ciempozuelos is because in the past, there was a channel that supplied the fountain in the town square. The spring was not abundant so the town built several wells, giving the meaning one hundred wells (cien + pozuelos). It seems that the first permanent settlement in the municipality could be Roman, being known as Ischadia (after the island of Ischia, Italy), which means land of fig trees.

In 1894 and 1895 a set of ceramics from the Bell Beaker culture were excavated in the municipality, prehistoric cultural artefacts associated with the Chalcolithic and initial periods of the Bronze Age. The ceramics of Ciempozuelos were recovered during an emergency excavation carried out in two swift exercises commissioned by the Royal Academy of History. The exact location of the site is unknown, because it seems the road "from Cuesta de la Reina to San Martín de la Vega" was built over it, now called M-404. It is assumed that it was at the foot of the Cerro del Castillejo, near the current Ciempozuelos train station.

In the Middle Ages Ciempozuelos joined the council of Segovia, but the population was dwindled, and it was not until 1457 the area was successfully repopulated. A few years later, it came under the rule of the county of Chinchón.

Constitution Plaza

In the 19th century, the Madrid-Aranjuez railway line was built, which continues to provide Ciempozuelos, with its own railway station. The test trip of this line occurred just days before its inauguration. In the second half of the 19th century, two psychiatric hospitals were built, one for men and one for women, by the hospital organisation named the 'brotherhood' of San Juan de Dios and Father Benito Menni.

== Notable people ==
- Aurora Rodríguez Carballeira (1879-1955), died at Ciempozuelos asylum after murdering her teenage daughter, conceived as a eugenics experiment.
- Ventura Rodríguez Tizón (July 14, 1717 – September 26, 1785), born at Ciempozuelos, was one of the most prominent Spanish architects and artist. His works included part of the Royal Palace of Aranjuez, and Cibeles fountain.
- Antonio de Oro Pulido (13 April 1904), born in Ciempozuelos, was a Spanish military officer, explorer and colonial administrator.
- Thess Mostoles, (Madrid, 1995), raised in Ciempozuelos, is a financial journalist in the UK, and has previously collaborated with The New York Times, becoming the youngest Spanish journalist to publish in the paper. In 2022, the AIPS selected her in the top 10 under 30 in the world for journalists in broadcasting.
- Francisco José Martín Gutiérrez, known as Paco Martín, (27 May 1967) is a former Spanish basketball player.
