= Tarfaya Province =

Province of Morocco

Coordinates: 27.93944°N 12.92611°W

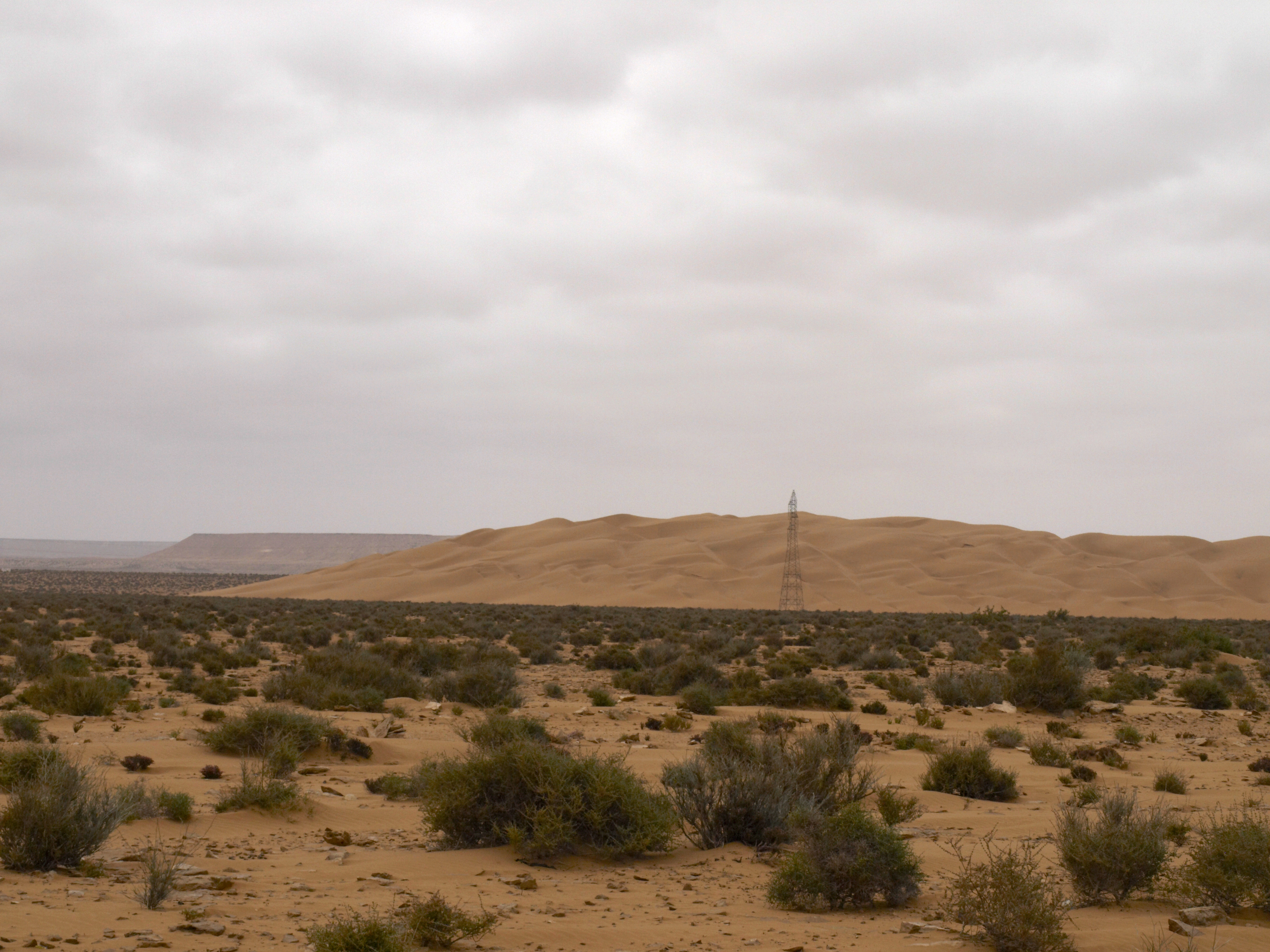
Dunes in Khenifiss National Park

Tarfaya Province in Laâyoune-Sakia El Hamra

Tarfaya (Arabic: طرفاية) is a province in the Moroccan economic region of Laâyoune-Sakia El Hamra, which includes the southwestern part of the territory of Morocco as of before 1975, and the northern part of the disputed territory of Western Sahara. Its population in 2004 was 10420. Its main town is Tarfaya.

In the north-east of the province, Khenifiss National Park is located.

== Subdivisions ==
The province is divided administratively into the following:

Name	Geographic code	Type	Households	Population (2004)	Foreign population	Moroccan population	Notes
Tarfaya	321.01.05.	Municipality	1,328	5,615	1	5,614	
Akhfennir	321.05.01.	Rural commune	343	1,583	1	1,582	
Tah	321.05.07.	Rural commune	242	1,255	0	1,255	
Daoura	321.05.03.	Rural commune	192	878	2	876	(eh)
El Hagounia	321.05.05.	Rural commune	180	1,089	0	1,089	(eh)

Notes :

- Before 2009, these communes were part of the Laâyoune Province.
- (eh) The two communes of Daoura and El Hagounia are located for their largest part in Western Sahara.
