= Mining industry of Morocco =

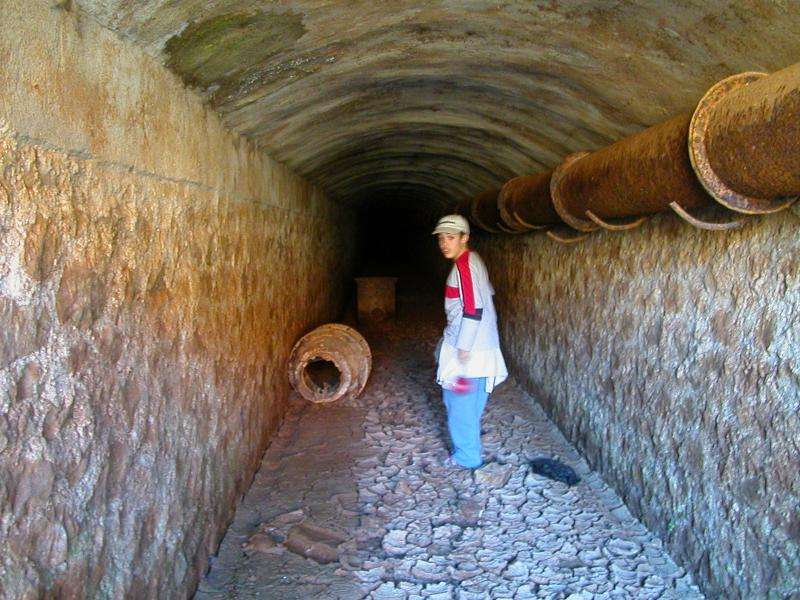
Mine at Mount Uixan

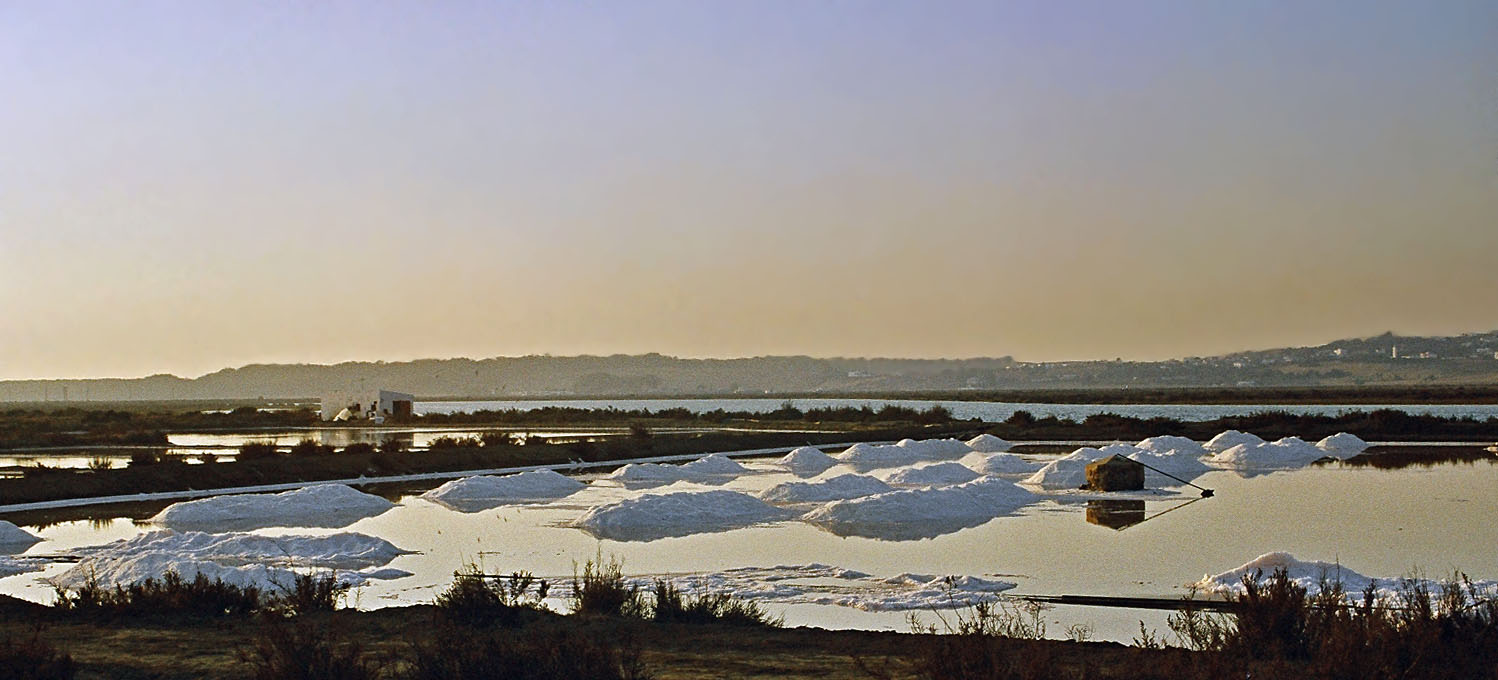
Salt evaporation pond in Larache

The mining industry of Morocco is important to the national economy. Morocco is the world's largest producer of phosphate, and contains about 75% of the world's estimated reserves. Mining contributed up to 35% of exports and 5% of GDP in 2011. Foreign investors have found the investment climate, the infrastructure, fiscal situation, and political stability very favorable to continue business in the country in this sector.

== History ==
Morocco has an ancient history of extraction of minerals for enhancing its economy. The technical know-how developed early on, particularly in the copper industry and manufacture of steel, which were spread by the Muslims of Spain and southern France to Europe.

In 1920, mineral extraction was reported in the Rif in the area of Melilla, where there were three iron mines as well as one working lead and zinc ore. The most important of these was the Compañía Española de Minas del Rif S.A., working large superficial masses of specular hematite. Setolazar Company, working the Navarrete mine, had an extensive concession estimated to contain more than 4 million tons of iron ore. The Compania Norte Africano had a monthly output of 200 tons of lead ore from pockets near the surface, in addition to calamine estimated to contain 40% zinc. Deposits of specular and dark hematite were recorded west of Melilla, within 5–6 kilometres (3.1–3.7 mi) of the sea. Brown hematite was noted in the area of Tetuan.

== Production and impacts ==
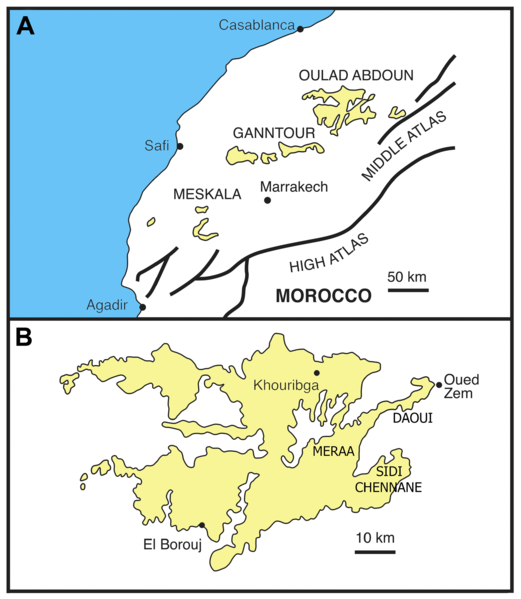
Morocco's phosphate basins

Phosphate is the chief product and it accounted for 14% of the world's production in 2011. Morocco holds 75% of the phosphate reserves of the world, and is ranked third in the world in its production. Other minerals extracted with increasing rate of production are barite, clays, cobalt, copper, fluorspar, iron ore, lead, salt, silver, talc, and zinc. Silver and lead production in Morocco are the highest in Africa.

== Legal framework ==
Mining legislation in force includes the Mining code Bill no. 1–73–412 of August 13, 1973, and corresponding orders of the Directorate of Mines. The overseeing authority is the Office National de Recherches et d'Exploitations Petrolieres (Office of Research and Petroleum exploitation) under the overall jurisdiction of the Ministry of Industry, Trade, Energy, and Mines]. Mining permits and licenses are issued by the department within the framework of Mining Code. Specific organizations established to promote the mining sector are the Phosphates Cherifian Office (OCP) in 1920 and the National Hydrocarbon and Mines Agency (ONHYM) in 2003.

== Commodities ==
Phosphates, lead, fluorine, and antimony are found in the Atlantic coast over a stretch of 60–120 kilometres (37–75 mi), and also in central Morocco. The Anti-Atlas has reserves of copper, manganese, gold and silver, cobalt, tin, titanium, and tungsten. The High Atlas has reserves of lead, zinc, copper, manganese, iron, and barite, while zinc, antimony, strategic metals, and smectic clays are sourced in the Rif. The eastern region is known for lead, zinc, and coal.

== Outlook ==
The mining sector is poised for increased participation of private sector companies and also in the fuel sector in natural gas and petroleum extraction. The mining sector operations now under the government sector have been proposed to be privatized to enhance production.
