= Moulay Hamdi Ould Errachid =

Moroccan politician

- مولاي حمدي ولد الرشيد
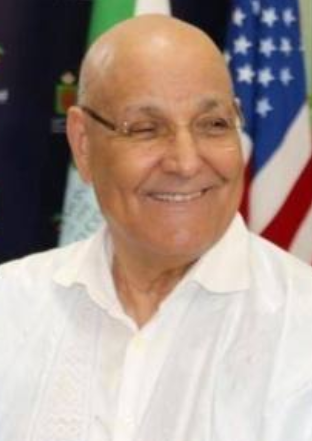
- Ould Errachid in 2023

Personal details
- Born: 1947 (age 78–79) Laâyoune
- Party: Istiqlal Party

Moulay Hamdi Ould Errachid (Arabic: مولاي حمدي ولد الرشيد; born 1947) is a Moroccan politician currently serving as mayor of Laâyoune and president of the communal council of Laâyoune since 2006 under the banner of the Istiqlal Party. Ould Errachid also serves as a parliamentarian representing the Laâyoune-Sakia El Hamra constituency. He is a member of the central bureau of the party, where he coordinates the three Southern Provinces and chairs multiple local associations in Laayoune.

== Early life and education ==
Moulay Hamdi Ould Errachid was born in 1947 in a tent near Laâyoune within the Reguibat tribe. His father, a respected herdsman in the tribe, was a veteran of a tribal revolt against France during their conquest of Morocco in 1937. He is the brother of Khalihenna Ould Errachid.

== Career and views ==
After the Green March, Ould Errachid was recruited into the Ministry of Interior in 1977, where he was a caïd for a district of Laayoune. He was elected as a parliamentarian during the 2002 Moroccan general election under the banner of the Istiqlal Party. In 2006, he became the president of the communal council of Laâyoune.

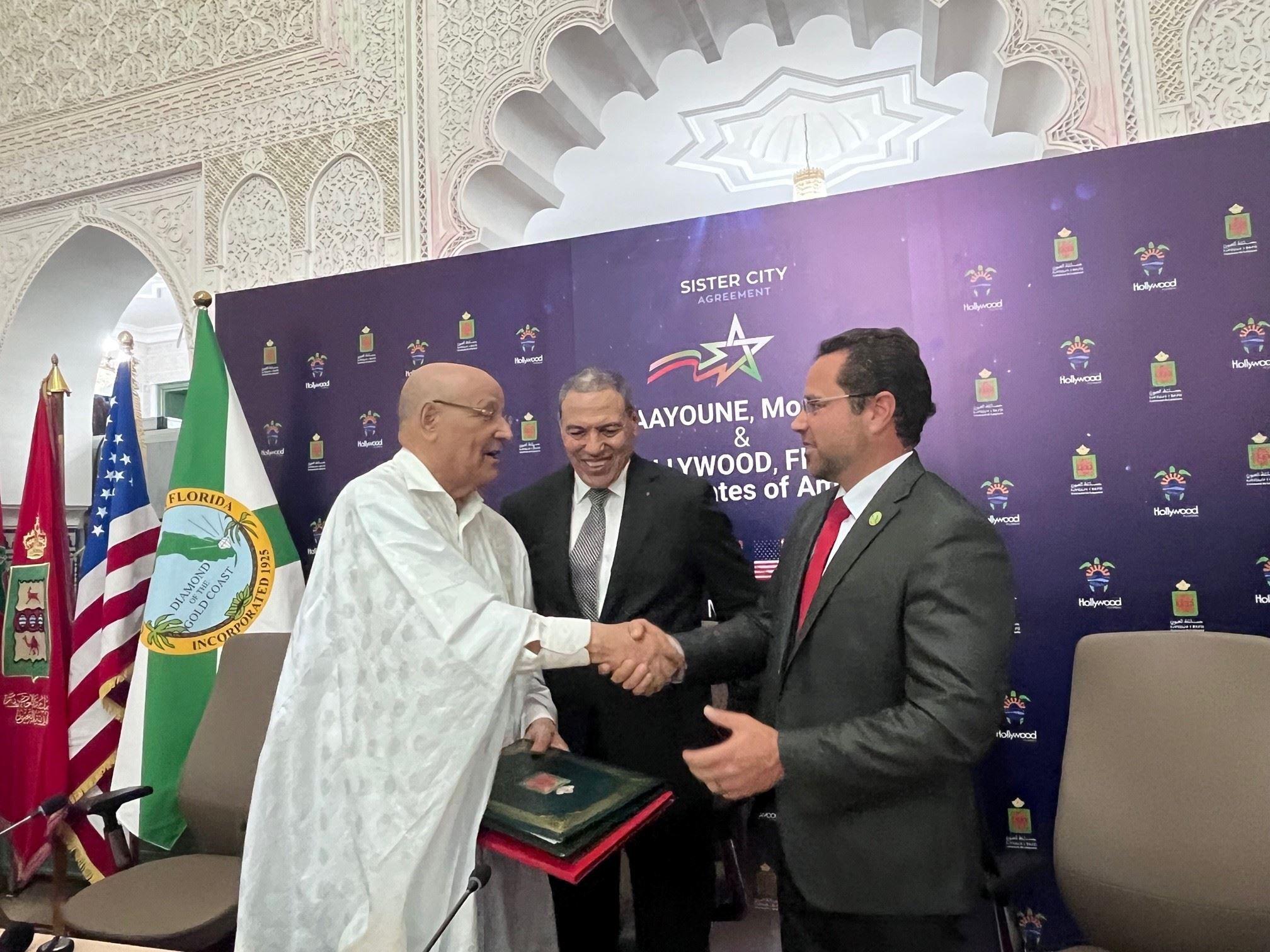
Moulay Hamdi Ould Errachid (left) and Josh Levy, mayor of Hollywood, Florida, at the signing of a sister city agreement between Hollywood and Laayoune, 2021

Following his election, he expressed his interest in carrying out major projects and improving the socio-economic development of the region. Under Ould Errachid's tenure as mayor of Laâyoune, the city underwent a "metamorphosis" over the past fifteen years which he has credited to the New Development Model for the Southern Provinces led by King Mohammed VI.

In 2010, he spoke to the French Senate regarding the twinning of Laayoune with European cities and investment opportunities. In 2023, he signed a sister city agreement between Laayoune and the city of Hollywood, Florida in partnership with Sister Cities International in hopes of improving local government cooperation, trade, cultural ties, and understanding.
