= Laayoune =

Largest city of Western Sahara

Laayoune العيون (Arabic) El Aaiún (Spanish)
- City
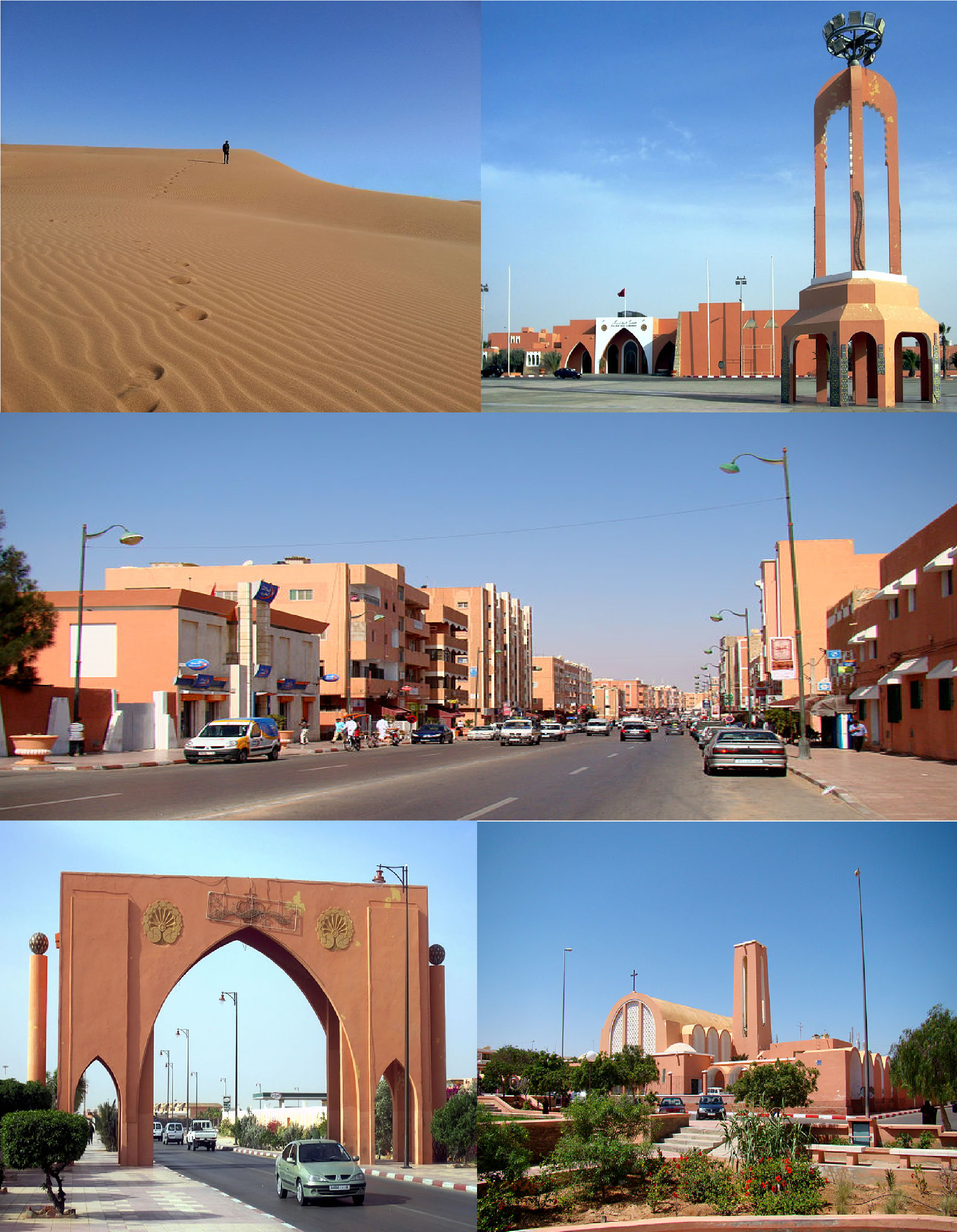
- Left to right, top to bottom: Footprints on the sand, Place Mechouar, Street, Monumental Arch, Laayoune Cathedral

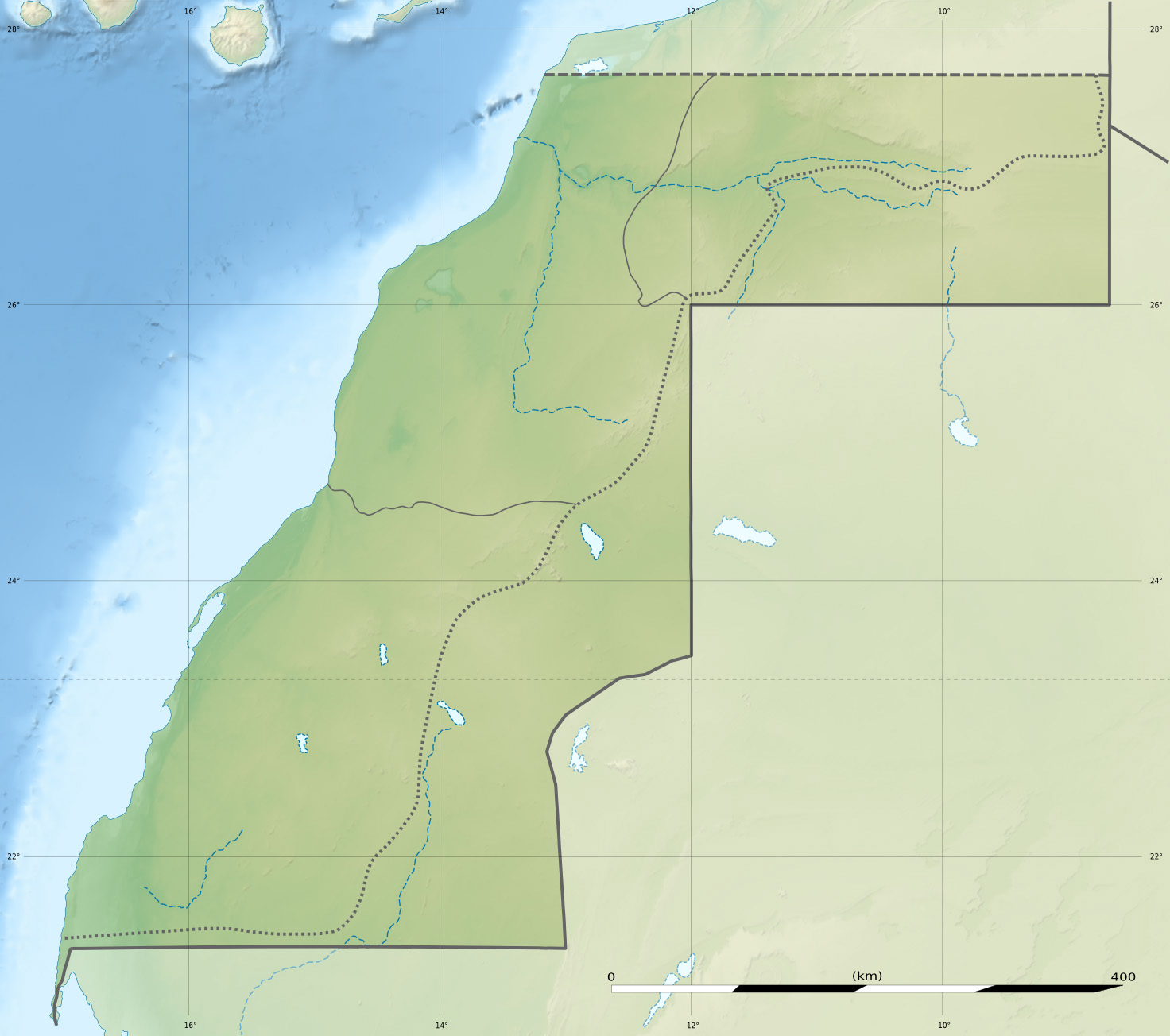
- Location in Western Sahara Laayoune (Africa)
- Coordinates: 27°09′00″N 13°11′56″W
- Non-self-governing territory: Western Sahara
- Claimed by: Morocco; Sahrawi Arab Democratic Republic
- Controlled by: Morocco
- Region: Laâyoune-Sakia El Hamra
- Province: Laâyoune
- Settled: 1934
- Founded: 1938
- Founder: Antonio de Oro

Government
  - Mayor: Moulay Hamdi Ould Errachid (Istiqlal)

Area
  - Total: 247.8 km^{2} (95.7 sq mi)

Population (2024)
  - Total: 262,791
  - Rank: 1st in the Western Sahara
  - Density: 1,060/km^{2} (2,747/sq mi)
- Time zone: UTC+0 (GMT)

Laayoune (Note: /lɑːˈjuːn/ lah-YOON, also UK: /laɪˈ-/ ly-, French: Laâyoune [la.ajun]) or El Aaiún (Note: /ˌɛl aɪˈ(j)uːn/ EL eye-(Y)OON, Spanish: [el (a)aˈʝun]; Arabic: العيون, al-ʕuyūn [alʕujuːn], Hassaniyya: [ˈləʕjuːn], lit. 'The Springs') is the largest city of the disputed territory of Western Sahara, with a population of 262,791 in 2024. The city is the de jure capital of the Sahrawi Arab Democratic Republic, though it is under de facto Moroccan administration as occupied territory. The modern city is thought to have been founded by the Spanish captain Antonio de Oro in 1938. From 1958 it became the administrative capital of the Spanish Sahara, administered by the Governor General of Spanish West Africa.

Laayoune is the capital of the Laâyoune-Sakia El Hamra region administered by Morocco, but it is still under the supervision of MINURSO, a UN mission.

The town is located south of the dry river of Saguia el-Hamra, where the old lower town built by Spanish colonists is located. The St. Francis of Assisi Cathedral was constructed during the Spanish period and is still active with a few Catholic missionaries.

== History ==
Laayoune or El Aaiún are respectively the French and Spanish transliterations of one of the possible Romanized Hassaniya Arabic names for the city: Layoun, which could mean "the springs", in reference to the oases that furnish the town's water supply.

The city was founded by the Spanish captain Antonio de Oro in 1938 as a small military outpost but quickly became the Spanish Sahara's administrative and political center. The location was chosen for two reasons: the presence of water and the strategic military position offered. Its placement on the banks of the Saguia el-Hamra river enabled good communication with the harbors of Tarfaya and Boujdour. Due to the discovery of vast phosphate deposits at the Bou Craa site, the city experienced a burst of economic growth during the 1940s with the phosphate industry.

The town was the scene of the Zemla Intifada that occurred on June 17, 1970, culminating in a massacre with deaths ranging from 2 to 11 people and hundreds injured.

After the Spanish withdrew in 1975, Laayoune, along with much of the rest of the Western Sahara, was annexed by Morocco. Since then, large numbers of Moroccans have moved to the city and now outnumber the indigenous Sahrawis, who have gradually given up their traditional nomadic lifestyles.

The city has continued to develop rapidly and benefits from a desalination plant. The city's rate of urbanization continues to outpace that of Morocco, though on most indicators of human development it lags behind southern Morocco.

== Climate ==
Laayoune has a hot desert climate (Köppen climate classification BWh), moderated by the Canary Current, with an average annual temperature just over 21 °C (70 °F).

Climate data for Laayoune (1991–2020)
Month	Jan	Feb	Mar	Apr	May	Jun	Jul	Aug	Sep	Oct	Nov	Dec	Year
Record high °C (°F)	32.9 (91.2)	36.7 (98.1)	39.8 (103.6)	41.6 (106.9)	46.2 (115.2)	45.9 (114.6)	46.6 (115.9)	47.0 (116.6)	45.0 (113.0)	42.1 (107.8)	36.9 (98.4)	32.8 (91.0)	47.0 (116.6)
Mean daily maximum °C (°F)	22.7 (72.9)	23.6 (74.5)	25.1 (77.2)	25.3 (77.5)	26.3 (79.3)	27.9 (82.2)	29.8 (85.6)	31.0 (87.8)	30.2 (86.4)	28.9 (84.0)	26.2 (79.2)	23.7 (74.7)	26.7 (80.1)
Daily mean °C (°F)	17.3 (63.1)	18.1 (64.6)	19.5 (67.1)	20.1 (68.2)	21.3 (70.3)	23.0 (73.4)	24.8 (76.6)	25.7 (78.3)	24.9 (76.8)	23.7 (74.7)	20.9 (69.6)	18.4 (65.1)	21.5 (70.7)
Mean daily minimum °C (°F)	11.8 (53.2)	12.8 (55.0)	14.1 (57.4)	15.1 (59.2)	16.3 (61.3)	18.1 (64.6)	19.7 (67.5)	20.4 (68.7)	19.7 (67.5)	18.4 (65.1)	15.6 (60.1)	13.0 (55.4)	16.2 (61.2)
Record low °C (°F)	6.2 (43.2)	6.9 (44.4)	8.9 (48.0)	10.5 (50.9)	12.0 (53.6)	13.6 (56.5)	16.2 (61.2)	16.0 (60.8)	14.0 (57.2)	12.3 (54.1)	8.5 (47.3)	7.0 (44.6)	6.2 (43.2)
Average precipitation mm (inches)	9.3 (0.37)	8.6 (0.34)	4.6 (0.18)	0.8 (0.03)	0.6 (0.02)	0.2 (0.01)	0.0 (0.0)	0.5 (0.02)	1.6 (0.06)	3.6 (0.14)	8.6 (0.34)	9.8 (0.39)	48.2 (1.90)
Average precipitation days (≥ 1.0 mm)	1.6	1.5	1.2	0.2	0.2	0.1	0.0	0.1	0.4	0.9	1.4	1.5	9.1
Mean monthly sunshine hours	239.1	234.7	281.4	296.5	326.5	308.9	290.3	286.9	260.1	266.1	243.9	229.8	3,264.2
Source: NOAA (sun 1981-2010)

=== Climate change ===
A 2019 paper published in PLOS One estimated that under Representative Concentration Pathway 4.5, a "moderate" scenario of climate change where global warming reaches ~2.5–3 °C (4.5–5.4 °F) by 2100, the climate of Laayoune in the year 2050 would most closely resemble the current climate of Alexandria. The annual temperature would increase by 1 °C (1.8 °F), and the temperature of the warmest month by 1.8 °C (3.2 °F), while the temperature of the coldest month would decrease by 0.1 °C (0.18 °F). According to Climate Action Tracker, the current warming trajectory appears consistent with 2.7 °C (4.9 °F), which closely matches RCP 4.5.

== Demographics ==
Historical population
Year	Pop.	±%
1982	93,875	—
1994	136,950	+45.9%
2004	183,691	+34.1%
2014	217,732	+18.5%
2023	262,791	+20.7%

Laayoune has a population of 262,791 and is the largest city in Western Sahara.

== Economy and status ==
The city is a hub for fishing and for phosphate mining in the region. In 2010, the country was negotiating a new fishing agreement with Europe over offshore fishing.

== Sport ==
The football club of the city is Jeunesse Massira. The club plays in the Moroccan Second Division, the second highest football league in the country. Jeunesse Massira uses Stade Sheikh Mohamed Laghdaf for training and games.

== Transport ==
Laayoune is served by the international Hassan I Airport.

== Education ==
French school associated to the Alliance française was established in 2018, the city also includes a Spanish international school, Colegio Español La Paz, owned by the Spanish government.

== Diplomatic missions ==
On 18 December 2019, Comoros became the first nation to open a consulate in support of Moroccan claims to the region. In January 2020, Gabon opened also a general consulate. Later on, São Tomé and Príncipe, the Central African Republic, Ivory Coast, Burundi, Eswatini, Zambia, the United Arab Emirates, and Bahrain, also opened consulates in the city.

== Gallery ==
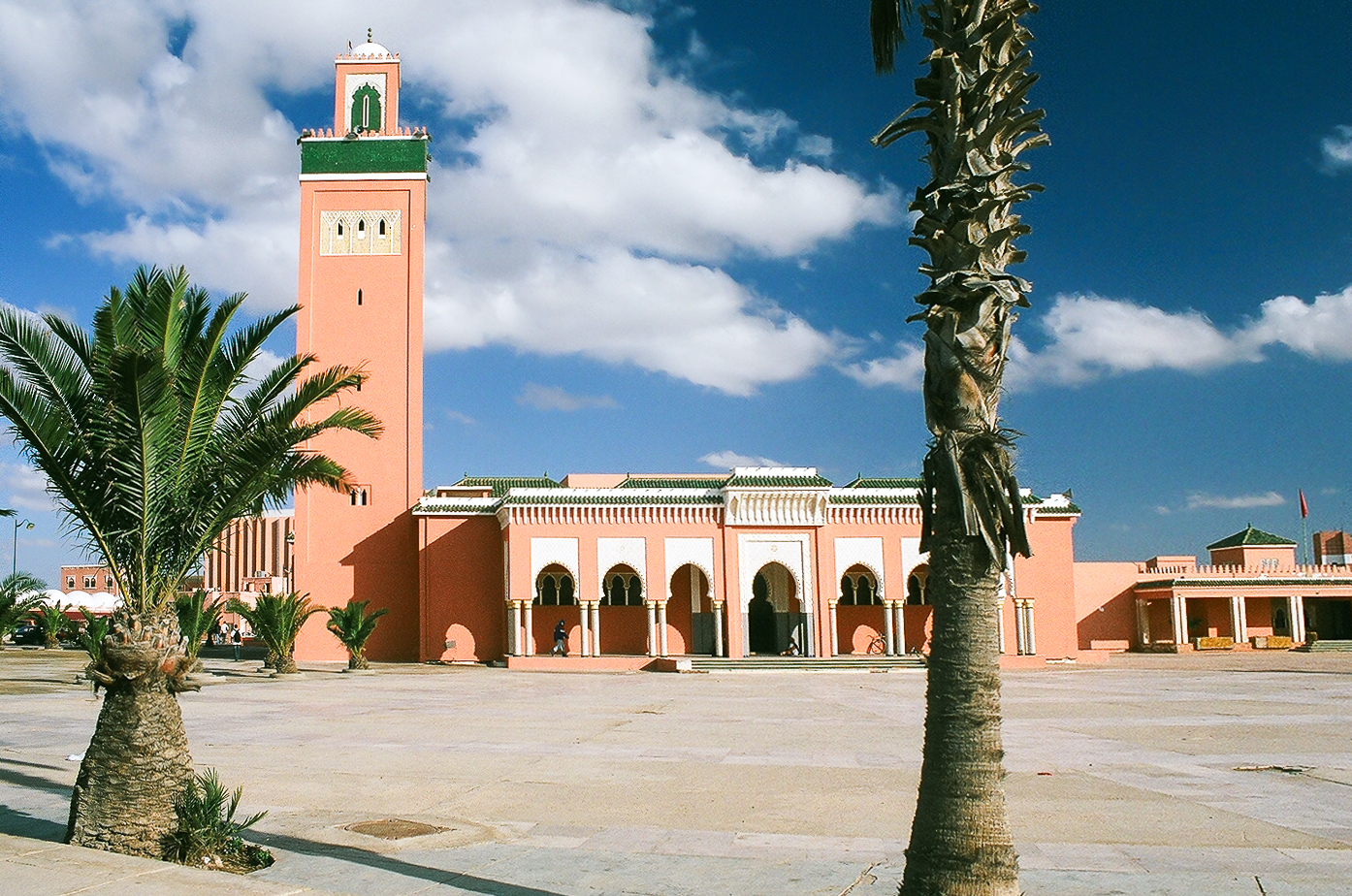
Mosque of Moulay Abd el Aziz

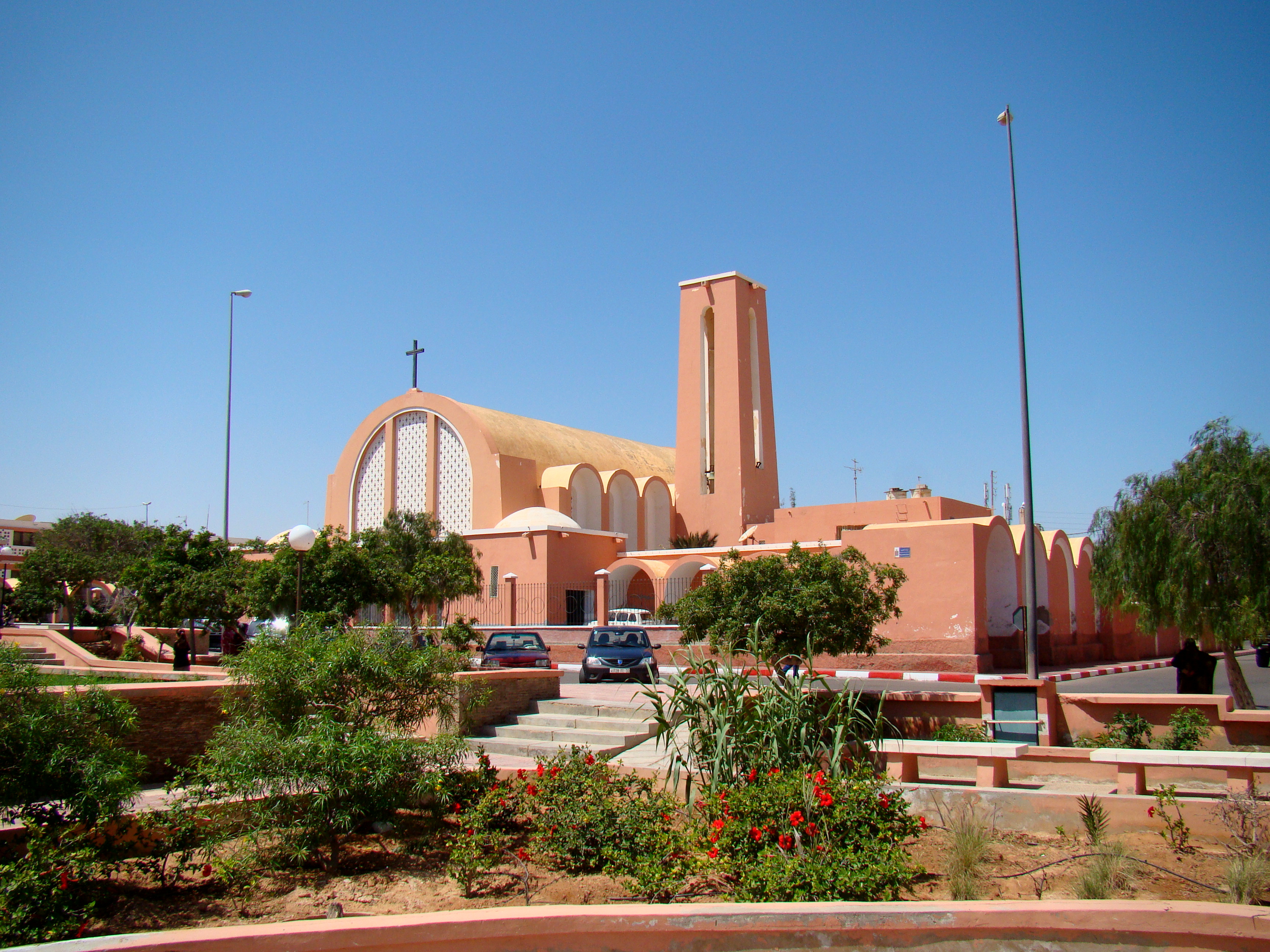
Spanish Cathedral of Saint Francis of Assisi

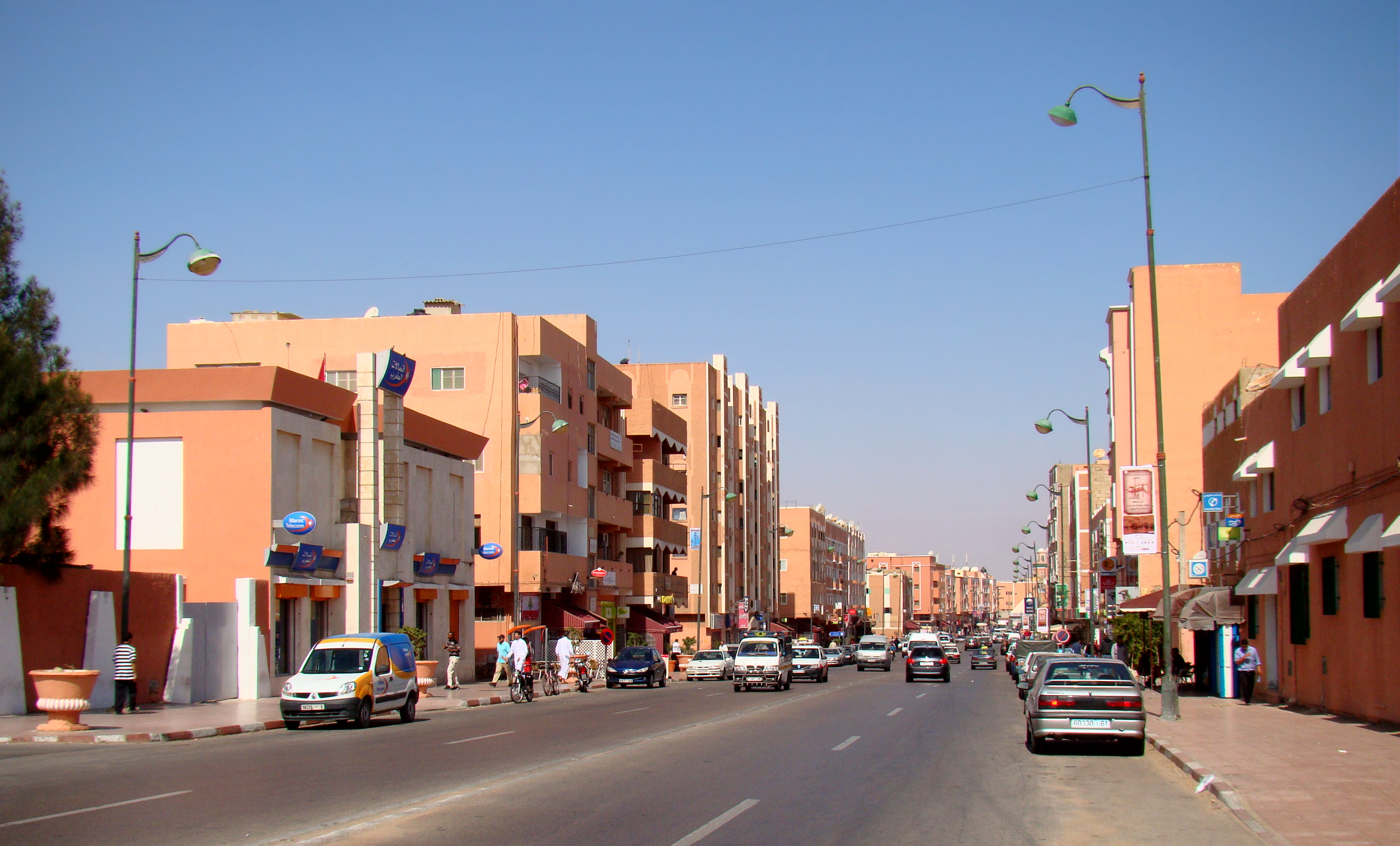
Avenue Mekka

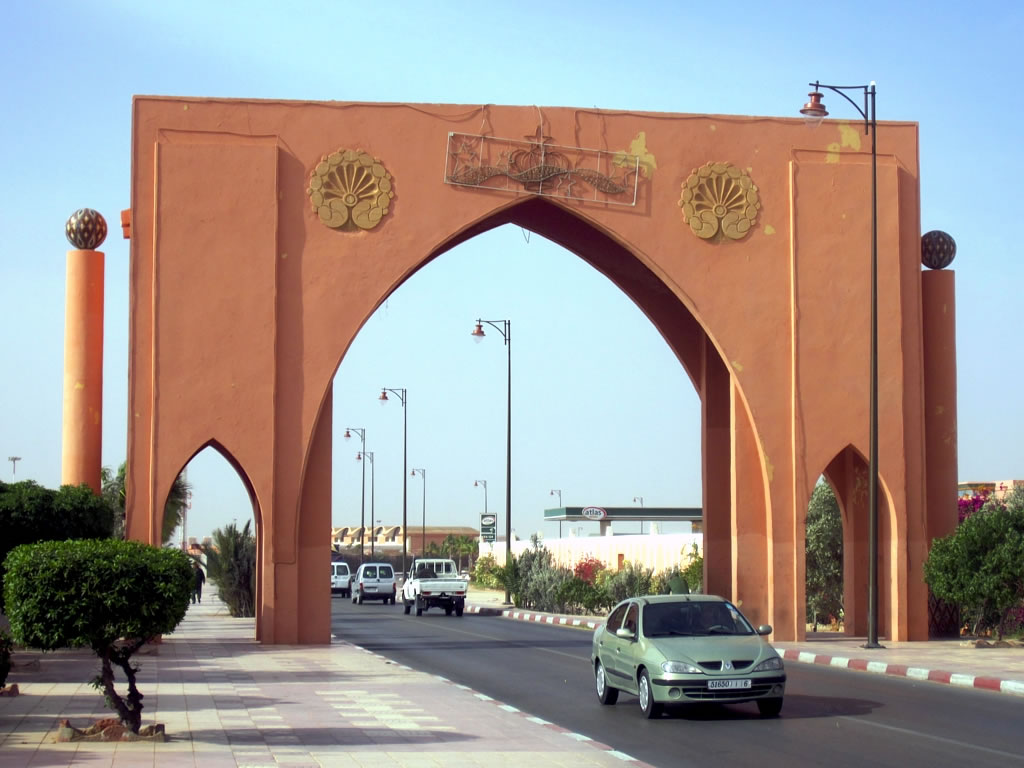
One entrance of the city

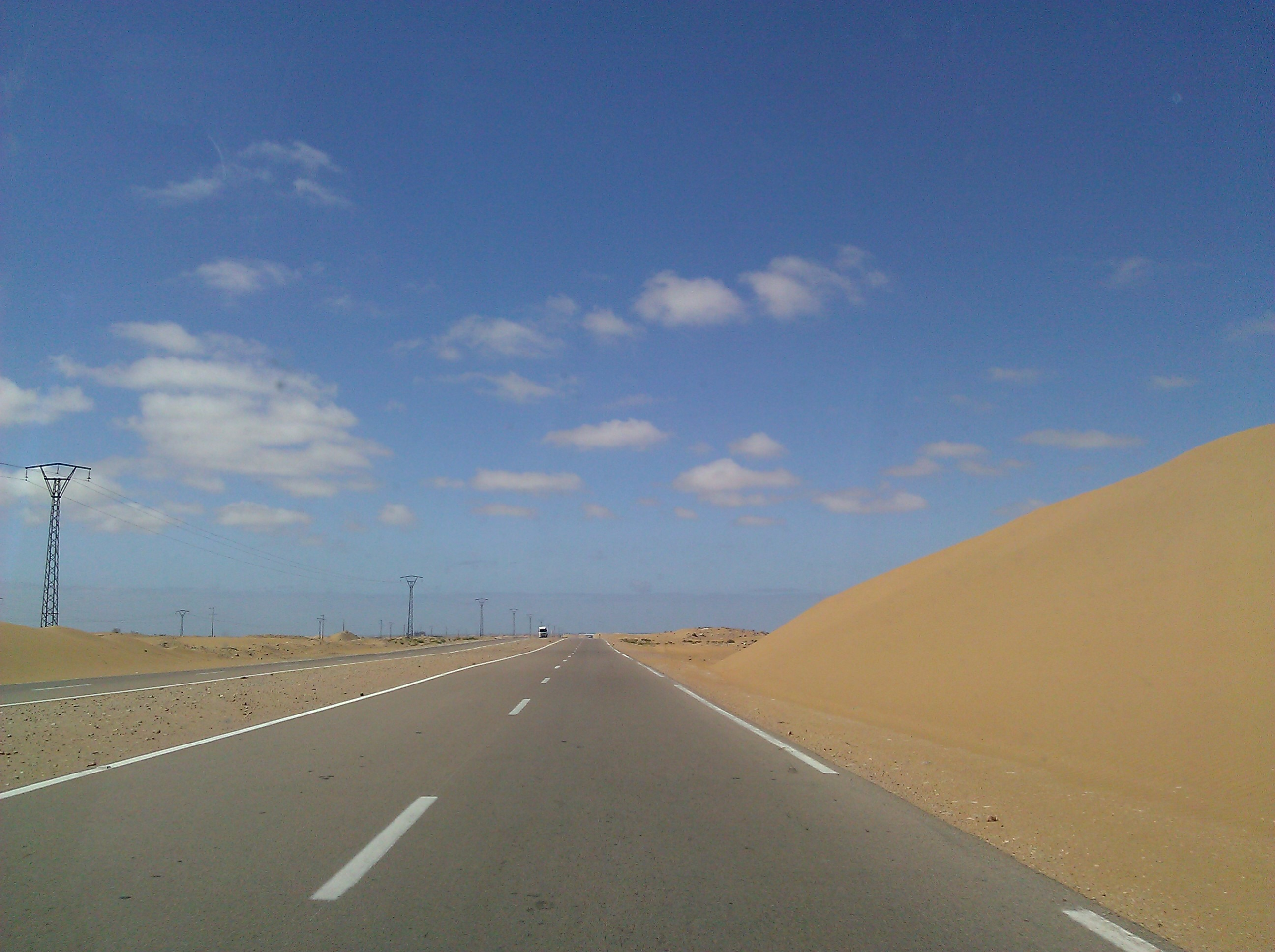
Road to El Marsa, the harbor of the city.

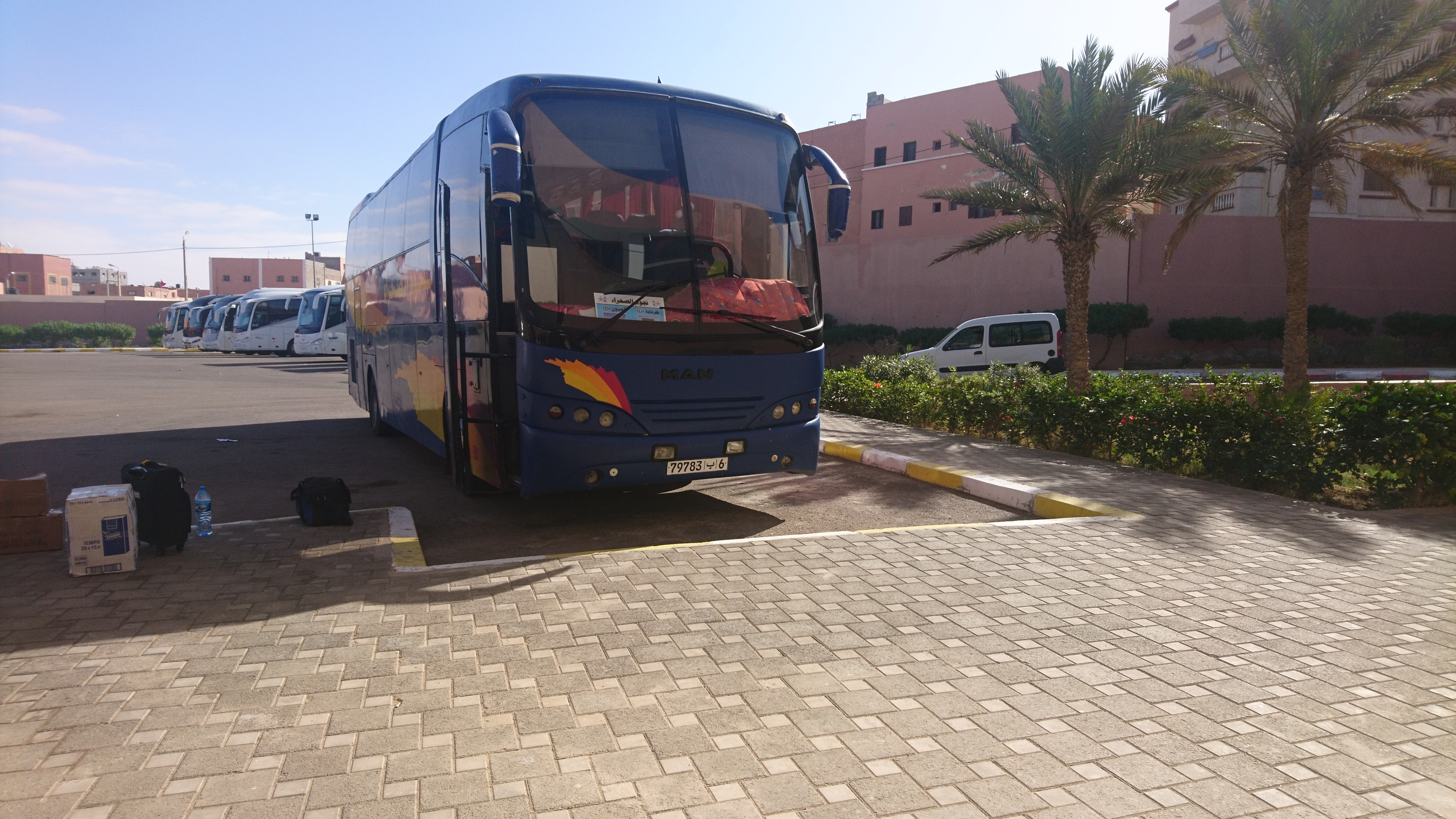
Laâyoune bus station.

== See also ==
- List of cities in Western Sahara
