= Laayoune-Sakia El Hamra =

Region of Morocco

Laâyoune-Sakia El Hamra Region جهة العيون-الساقية الحمراء (Arabic) ⵜⴰⵎⵏⴰⴹⵜ ⵏ ⵍⵄⵢⵓⵏ-ⵙⵙⵇⵉⵢⴰ ⵍⵃⵎⵕⴰ (Standard Moroccan Tamazight) Región de El Aaiún-Saguía el-Hamra
- Region (disputed)
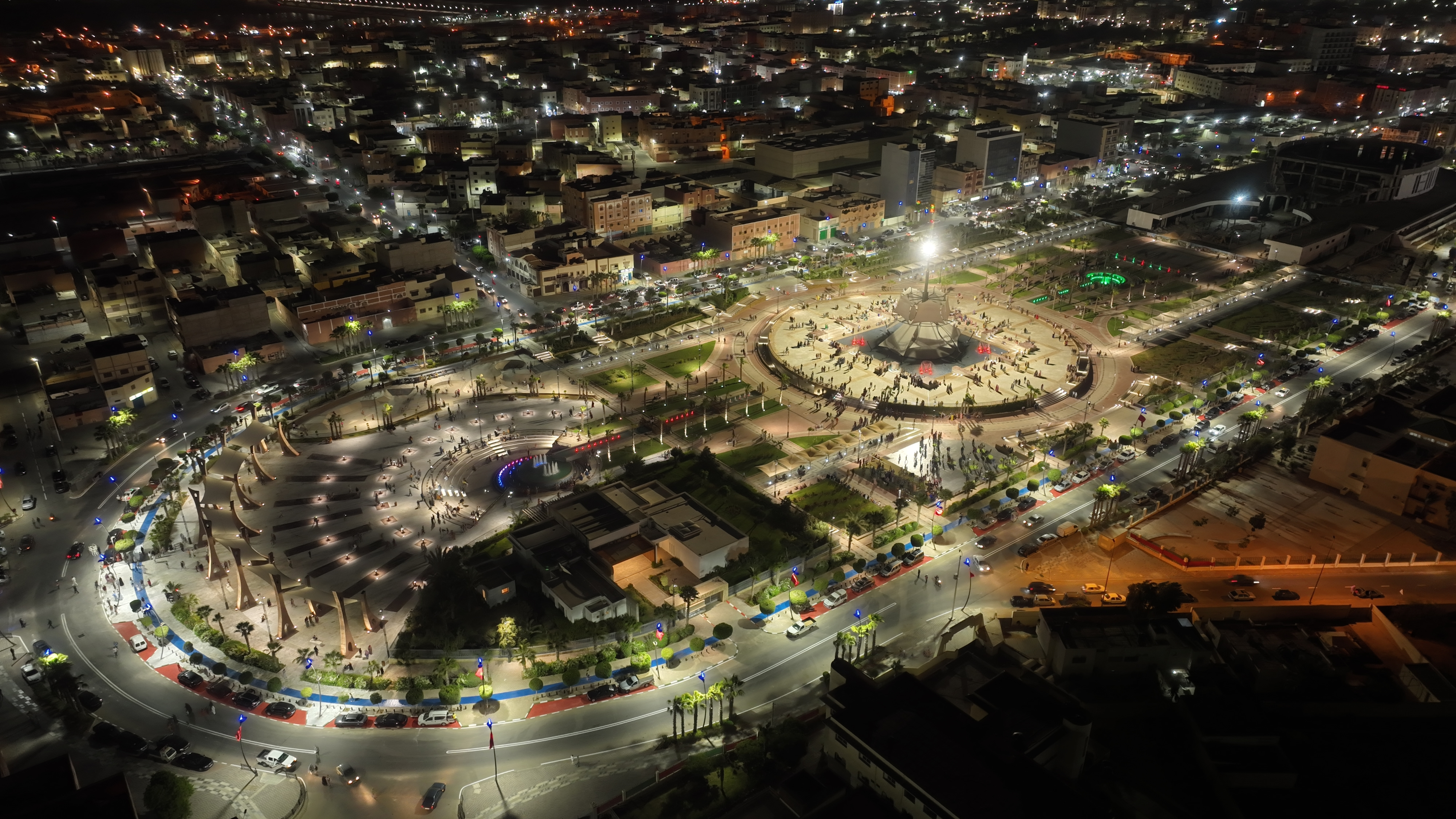
- City centre of Laâyoune

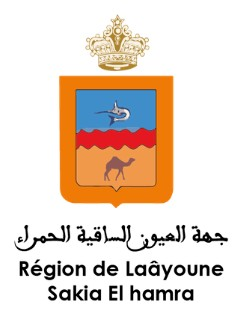
- Seal

- Location in territory occupied by Morocco
- Coordinates: 26°08′N 14°30′W
- Countries: Morocco; Sahrawi Arab Democratic Republic
- Created: September 2015
- Capital: Laâyoune

Government
  - Type: Governor–regional council
  - Wali: Abdeslam Bekrate
  - Council president: Sidi Hamdi Ould Errachid (PI)

Area
  - Total: 140,018 km^{2} (54,061 sq mi)

Population (2024)
  - Total: 451,028
  - Rank: 10th out of 12 Regions
  - Density: 3.22121/km^{2} (8.34291/sq mi)
- Time zone: UTC+0 (GMT)
- ISO 3166 code: MA-11

Laâyoune-Sakia El Hamra (Note: Arabic: العيون - الساقية الحمراء, romanized: al-ʿuyūn as-sāqiya l-ḥamrāʾ Standard Moroccan Tamazight: ⵍⵄⵢⵓⵏ-ⵙⵙⵇⵉⵢⴰ ⵍⵃⵎⵕⴰ) is one of the twelve administrative regions of Morocco. It is mainly located in the disputed territory of Western Sahara: the western part of the region is occupied by Morocco and the eastern part is controlled by the Sahrawi Arab Democratic Republic. The region as claimed by Morocco covers an area of 140,018 square kilometres (54,061 sq mi) and had a population of 451,028 as of the 2024 Moroccan census. The capital of the region is Laâyoune.

== Geography ==
Laâyoune-Sakia El Hamra borders the region of Guelmim-Oued Noun to the north and Dakhla-Oued Ed-Dahab to the south. It shares its eastern border with Mauritania's Tiris Zemmour Region, and to its west is the Atlantic Ocean. The towns of Tarfaya, El Marsa and Boujdour are located on the Atlantic coast, and the Canary Islands are located offshore. The regional capital Laâyoune is located inland near El Marsa, and the region's second-largest town Smara is located near its geographic centre. The Moroccan Wall runs through the region and the area to its east is under the control of the Sahrawi Arab Democratic Republic.

== History ==
Laâyoune-Sakia El Hamra was formed in September 2015 by attaching Es Semara Province, formerly part of Guelmim-Es Semara region, to the former region of Laâyoune-Boujdour-Sakia El Hamra.

On 29 October 2023, the Polisario Front carried out an operation in the Es Semara Province of the region, dropping four explosive projectiles, killing one Moroccan civilian and injuring three.

== Government ==
The first president of the regional council, Hamdi Ould Errachid, was elected on 14 September 2015. He is a member of the Istiqlal Party and previously headed the council of the former Laâyoune-Boujdour-Sakia El Hamra region. His uncle Moulay Hamdi Ould Errachid is the mayor of Laayoune. Yahdih Bouchab was appointed governor (wali) of the region on 13 October 2015.

Hamdi Ould Rachid was re-elected president of the regional council during the 2021 elections. The current wali of the region is Abdeslam Bekrate.

=== Regional leadership ===
Wali of Laâyoune-Sakia El Hamra since 2015
Name	Duration	Under
Yahdih Bouchab	2015–2019	King Mohammed VI
Abdeslam Bekrate	2019–present	King Mohammed VI

Regional Council Presidents of Laâyoune-Sakia El Hamra since 2015
Name	Duration	Party	Under
Sidi Hamdi Ould Errachid	2015–present	PI	King Mohammed VI

== Subdivisions ==
Provinces of Laâyoune-Sakia El Hamra

Laâyoune-Sakia El Hamra consists of four provinces:

- Boujdour Province
- Es Semara Province
- Laâyoune Province
- Tarfaya Province
