= Western Sahara =

Disputed territory in north-western Africa

Western Sahara الصحراء الغربية (Arabic) Sahara Occidental (Spanish)
- Non-self-governing territory
- Location of Western Sahara (dark green) in Africa
- Coordinates: 25°N 13°W
- Status: Non-self-governing territory under partial Moroccan military occupation
- Legitimate representative: (Sahrawi Arab Democratic Republic) Polisario Front
- Administering power: Spain (de jure) (Note: In 1976, Spain withdrew from Western Sahara and informed the Secretary-General of the United Nations that it no longer considers itself responsible for the territory. Nonetheless, the criminal division of the Audiencia Nacional ruled in 2014 that Spain remains as Western Sahara's de jure administering power. This position is shared by the United Nations, the African Union, and several jurists. Additionally, Spain continues to manage Western Saharan airspace.)
- Claimants: Morocco; Sahrawi Republic
- Largest city: Laayoune

Area
  - Total: 272,000 km^{2} (105,000 sq mi)

Population
  - Total: ▲565,581
  - Density: 2.03/km^{2} (5.3/sq mi)
- (2021)
- Time zone: UTC+00:00
- ISO 3166 code: EH

Western Sahara (Note: Arabic: الصحراء الغربية, romanized: aṣ-Ṣaḥrā' al-Gharbiyyah; Spanish: Sahara Occidental/Sáhara Occidental) is a United Nations–designated non-self-governing territory in north-western Africa. It has a surface area of 272,000 square kilometres (105,000 sq mi). Western Sahara is the last African colonial state yet to achieve independence and has been dubbed "Africa's last colony". With an estimated 600,000 inhabitants, it is the most sparsely populated territory in Africa and the second most sparsely populated territory in the world after Greenland, consisting mainly of desert flatlands.

Francoist Spain previously colonized the territory as the Spanish Sahara until 1975–1976. Spain attempted to transfer its administration to Morocco and Mauritania despite an advisory opinion of the International Court of Justice that those countries had no sovereignty over Western Sahara; a war erupted and the pro-independence Polisario Front proclaimed the Sahrawi Arab Democratic Republic (SADR). Mauritania withdrew its claims in 1979, and Morocco secured de facto control of most of the territory, including all major cities and most natural resources. The SADR established a government-in-exile in Tindouf, Algeria. A UN-sponsored ceasefire agreement was reached in 1991, though a planned referendum monitored by the UN's MINURSO mission has since stalled. MINURSO was discontinued in November 2026 after deadlock in the United Nations Security Council led to a failure to extend its mandate.

Approximately 30% of Western Sahara (mainly inland and along the Mauritanian and Algerian borders) is controlled by the Polisario Front and the remaining 70% (including almost all of the coast) is occupied by Morocco. Morocco maintains the Berm, a 2,700 km-long (1,700 mi) wall lined with land mines that splits the territory. The Polisario Front is recognized by the UN as the legitimate representative of the people of Western Sahara and is primarily supported by Algeria. The SADR has received partial international recognition and membership in the African Union. Morocco is supported by France and the United States; several states began expressing support for its autonomy proposal in the 2020s, and the United Nations Security Council in 2025 endorsed negotiating based on the proposal.

== History ==
=== Early history ===
The earliest known inhabitants of Western Sahara were the Gaetuli. Depending on the century, Roman-era sources describe the area as inhabited by Gaetulian Autololes or the Gaetulian Daradae tribes. Berber heritage is still evident from regional and place-name toponymy, as well as from tribal names.

Other early inhabitants of Western Sahara may be the Bafour and the Serer The Bafour were later replaced or absorbed by Berber-speaking populations, which eventually merged in turn with the migrating Beni Ḥassān Arab tribes. The religious and ethnic persecution of the Serer people resulted in their southward migration in the 11th century and the Serer Exodus.

The arrival of Islam in the 8th century played a major role in the development of the Maghreb region. Trade developed further, and the territory may have been one of the routes for caravans, especially between Marrakesh and Tombouctou in Mali.

In the 11th century, the Maqil Arabs (fewer than 200 individuals) settled in Morocco (mainly in the Draa River valley, between the Moulouya River, Tafilalt and Taourirt). Towards the end of the Almohad Caliphate, the Beni Hassan, a sub-tribe of the Maqil, were called by the local ruler of the Sous to quell a rebellion; they settled in the Sous Ksours and controlled such cities as Taroudant. During Marinid dynasty rule, the Beni Hassan rebelled but were defeated by the Sultan and escaped beyond the Saguia el-Hamra dry river. The Beni Hassan then were at constant war with the Lamtuna nomadic Berbers of the Sahara. Over roughly five centuries, through a complex process of acculturation and mixing seen elsewhere in the Maghreb and North Africa, some of the indigenous Berber tribes mixed with the Maqil Arab tribes and formed a culture unique to Morocco and Mauritania.

=== Spanish province ===
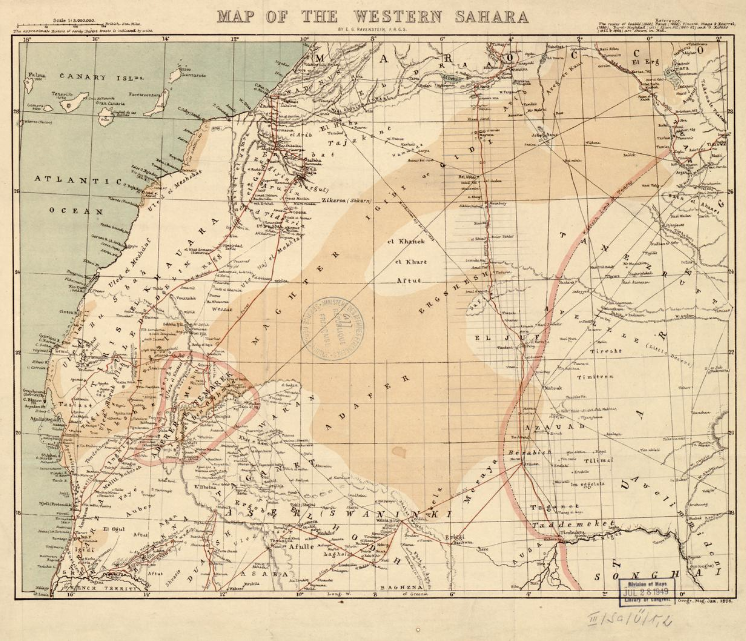
Western Sahara 1876

The Spanish presence in the region of modern-day Western Sahara lasted from 1884 to 1975. While initial Spanish interest in the Sahara was focused on using it as a port for the slave trade, by the 1700s Spain had transitioned economic activity on the Saharan coast towards commercial fishing. By the 19th century, Spain had claimed the southern coastal region and penetration of the hinterland gradually followed; later in 1904 the northern region was acquired. After an agreement among the European colonial powers at the Berlin Conference in 1884 on the division of spheres of influence in Africa, the same year Spain seized control of Western Sahara and established it as a Spanish colony. Despite establishing their first colony in the region at Río de Oro Bay in 1884, the Spanish were unable to pacify the interior of the region until the 1930s. Raids and rebellions by the indigenous Saharan population kept the Spanish forces out of much of the territory for a long time. The territory was eventually subdued by joint Spanish and French forces in 1934, the same year the Spaniards divided their Saharan territories into two regions named after the rivers: Saguía el-Hamra (the "Red River") and Río de Oro. After 1939 and the outbreak of World War II, this area was administered by Spanish Morocco. In 1958, Spain joined the district of Saguia el-Hamra in the north with the Río de Oro (in the south) to form the province of Spanish Sahara, following Morocco's claiming these regions in 1957. As a consequence, Ahmed Belbachir Haskouri, the Chief of Cabinet, General Secretary of the Government of Spanish Morocco, cooperated with the Spanish to select governors in that area. The Saharan lords who were already in prominent positions, such as the members of Maa El Ainain family, provided a recommended list of candidates for new governors. Together with the Spanish High Commissioner, Belbachir selected from this list. During the annual celebration of Muhammad's birthday, these lords paid their respects to the caliph to show loyalty to the Moroccan monarchy.

Spanish and French protectorates in Morocco and Spanish Sahara, 1912

As time went by, Spanish colonial rule began to unravel with the general wave of decolonization after World War II; former North African and sub-Saharan African possessions and protectorates gained independence from European powers. Spanish decolonization proceeded more slowly, but internal political and social pressures for it in mainland Spain built up towards the end of Francisco Franco's rule. There was a global trend towards complete decolonization. Spain abandoned most territories within neighboring Morocco in 1956, but resisted encroachment by the Moroccan Liberation Army within Ifni and Spanish Sahara from 1956 to 1958. In 1971, Sahrawi (an Arabic term for those from Sahara) students in Moroccan universities began organizing what came to be known as The Embryonic Movement for the Liberation of Saguía el Hamra and Río de Oro. The movement tried without success to gain backing from several Arab governments, including Algeria and Morocco. Spain began rapidly to divest itself of most of its remaining colonial possessions. By 1974–75 the government issued promises of a referendum on independence in Western Sahara.

At the same time, Morocco and Mauritania, which had historical and competing claims of sovereignty over the territory, argued that it had been artificially separated from their territories by the European colonial powers. Algeria, which also bordered the territory, viewed their demands with suspicion, as Morocco also claimed the Algerian provinces of Tindouf and Béchar. After arguing for a process of decolonization to be guided by the United Nations, the Algerian government under Houari Boumédiènne in 1975 committed to assisting the Polisario Front, which opposed both Moroccan and Mauritanian claims and demanded full independence of Western Sahara.

The UN attempted to settle these disputes through a visiting mission in late 1975, as well as a verdict from the International Court of Justice (ICJ). It acknowledged that Western Sahara had historical links with Morocco and Mauritania, but not sufficient to prove the sovereignty of either State over the territory at the time of the Spanish colonization. The population of the territory thus possessed the right of self-determination. On 6 November 1975 Morocco initiated the Green March into Western Sahara; 350,000 unarmed Moroccans converged on the city of Tarfaya in southern Morocco and waited for a signal from King Hassan II of Morocco to cross the border in a peaceful march. A few days before, on 31 October, Moroccan troops invaded Western Sahara from the north.

=== Demands for independence ===
System of the Moroccan Walls in Western Sahara set up in the 1980s

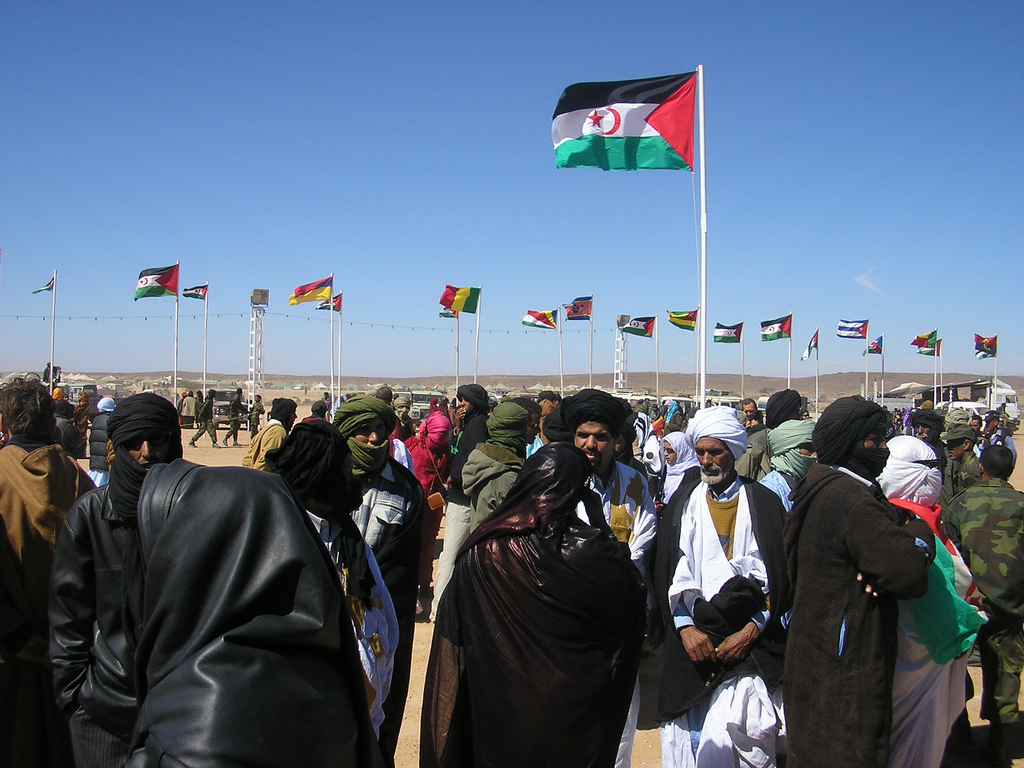
Commemoration of the 30th independence day from Spain in the Liberated Territories (2005)

In the waning days of Franco's rule, and after the Green March, the Spanish government signed a tripartite agreement with Morocco and Mauritania as it moved to transfer the territory on 14 November 1975. The accords were based on a bipartite administration, and Morocco and Mauritania each moved to annex the territories, with Morocco taking control of the northern two-thirds of Western Sahara as its Southern Provinces, and Mauritania taking control of the southern third as Tiris al-Gharbiyya. Spain terminated its presence in Spanish Sahara within three months, repatriating Spanish remains from its cemeteries.

The Moroccan and Mauritanian annexations were resisted by the Polisario Front, which had gained backing from Algeria. It initiated guerrilla warfare and, in 1979, Mauritania withdrew due to pressure from Polisario, including a bombardment of its capital and other economic targets. Morocco extended its control to the rest of the territory. It gradually contained the guerrillas by setting up an extensive sand-berm in the desert (known as the Border Wall or Moroccan Wall) to exclude guerrilla fighters. Hostilities ceased in a 1991 cease-fire, overseen by the peacekeeping mission MINURSO, under the terms of a UN Settlement Plan.

=== Stalling of the referendum and Settlement Plan ===
The referendum, originally scheduled for 1992, foresaw giving the local population the option between independence or affirming integration with Morocco, but it quickly stalled. In 1997, the Houston Agreement attempted to revive the proposal for a referendum but likewise has not had success. As of 2010, negotiations over terms have not resulted in any substantive action. At the heart of the dispute lies the question of who qualifies to be registered to participate in the referendum, and, since about the year 2000, Morocco considers that since there is no agreement on persons entitled to vote, a referendum is not possible. Meanwhile, Polisario still insisted on a referendum with independence as a clear option, without offering a solution to the problem of who is qualified to be registered to participate in it.

Both sides blame each other for the stalling of the referendum. The Polisario has insisted on only allowing those found on the 1974 Spanish Census lists (see below) to vote, while Morocco has insisted that the census was flawed by evasion and sought the inclusion of members of Sahrawi tribes that escaped from Spanish invasion to the north of Morocco by the 19th century.

Efforts by the UN special envoys to find a common ground for both parties did not succeed. By 1999 the UN had identified about 85,000 voters, with nearly half of them in the Moroccan-occupied parts of Western Sahara, and the others scattered between the Tindouf refugee camps, Mauritania and other places of exile. Polisario accepted this voter list, as it had done with the previous list presented by the UN (both of them originally based on the Spanish census of 1974), but Morocco refused and, as rejected voter candidates began a mass-appeals procedure, insisted that each application be scrutinized individually. This again brought the process to a halt.

According to a NATO delegation, MINURSO election observers stated in 1999, as the deadlock continued, that "if the number of voters does not rise significantly the odds were slightly on the SADR side". By 2001, the process had effectively stalemated and the UN Secretary-General asked the parties for the first time to explore other, third-way solutions. Indeed, shortly after the Houston Agreement (1997), Morocco officially declared that it was "no longer necessary" to include an option of independence on the ballot, offering instead autonomy. Erik Jensen, who played an administrative role in MINURSO, wrote that neither side would agree to a voter registration in which they were destined to lose (see Western Sahara: Anatomy of a Stalemate).

=== Baker Plan ===
As personal envoy of the Secretary-General, James Baker visited all sides and produced the document known as the "Baker Plan". This was discussed by the United Nations Security Council in 2000, and envisioned an autonomous Western Sahara Authority (WSA), which would be followed after five years by the referendum. Every person present in the territory would be allowed to vote, regardless of birthplace and with no regard to the Spanish census. It was rejected by both sides, although it was initially derived from a Moroccan proposal. According to Baker's draft, tens of thousands of post-annexation settlers from Morocco would be granted the vote in the Sahrawi independence referendum, and the ballot would be split three ways by the inclusion of an unspecified "autonomy", further undermining the independence camp. Morocco was also allowed to keep its army in the area and retain control over all security issues during both the autonomy years and the election. In 2002, the Moroccan king stated that the referendum idea was "out of date" since it "cannot be implemented"; Polisario retorted that that was only because of the King's refusal to allow it to take place.

In 2003, a new version of the plan was made official, with some additions spelling out the powers of the WSA, making it less reliant on Moroccan devolution. It also provided further detail on the referendum process in order to make it harder to stall or subvert. This second draft, commonly known as Baker II, was accepted by the Polisario as a "basis of negotiations" to the surprise of many. This appeared to abandon Polisario's previous position of only negotiating based on the standards of voter identification from 1991 (i.e. the Spanish census). After that, the draft quickly garnered widespread international support, culminating in the UN Security Council's unanimous endorsement of the plan in the summer of 2003.

=== End of the 2000s ===
Baker resigned his post at the United Nations in 2004; his term did not see the crisis resolved. His resignation followed several months of failed attempts to get Morocco to enter into formal negotiations on the plan, but he was met with rejection.

King Hassan II of Morocco initially supported the referendum idea in principle in 1982, and signed agreements with Polisario and the UN in 1991 and 1997. No major powers have expressed interest in forcing the issue, however, and Morocco has shown little interest in a real referendum. Hassan II's son and successor, Mohammed VI, has opposed any referendum on independence, and has said Morocco will never agree to one: "We shall not give up one inch of our beloved Sahara, not a grain of its sand." In 2006, he created an appointed advisory body Royal Advisory Council for Saharan Affairs (CORCAS), which proposes a self-governing Western Sahara as an autonomous community within Morocco.

The UN has put forth no replacement strategy after the breakdown of Baker II, and renewed fighting has been raised as a possibility. In 2005, former United Nations Secretary-General Kofi Annan reported increased military activity on both sides of the front and breaches of several cease-fire provisions against strengthening military fortifications.

Morocco has repeatedly tried to engage Algeria in bilateral negotiations, based on its view of Polisario as the cat's paw of the Algerian military. It has received vocal support from France and occasionally (and currently) from the United States. These negotiations would define the exact limits of a Western Sahara autonomy under Moroccan rule but only after Morocco's "inalienable right" to the territory was recognized as a precondition to the talks. The Algerian government has consistently refused, claiming it has neither the will nor the right to negotiate on behalf of the Polisario Front.

In May 2005, demonstrations and riots by supporters of independence or a referendum broke out in the Moroccan-occupied parts of Western Sahara and in parts of southern Morocco (notably the town of Assa). They were met by police. Several international human rights organizations expressed concern at what they termed abuse by Moroccan security forces, and a number of Sahrawi activists have been jailed. Pro-independence Sahrawi sources, including the Polisario, have given these demonstrations the name "Independence Intifada", while most sources have tended to see the events as being of limited importance. International press and other media coverage have been sparse, and reporting is complicated by the Moroccan government's policy of strictly controlling independent media coverage within the territory.

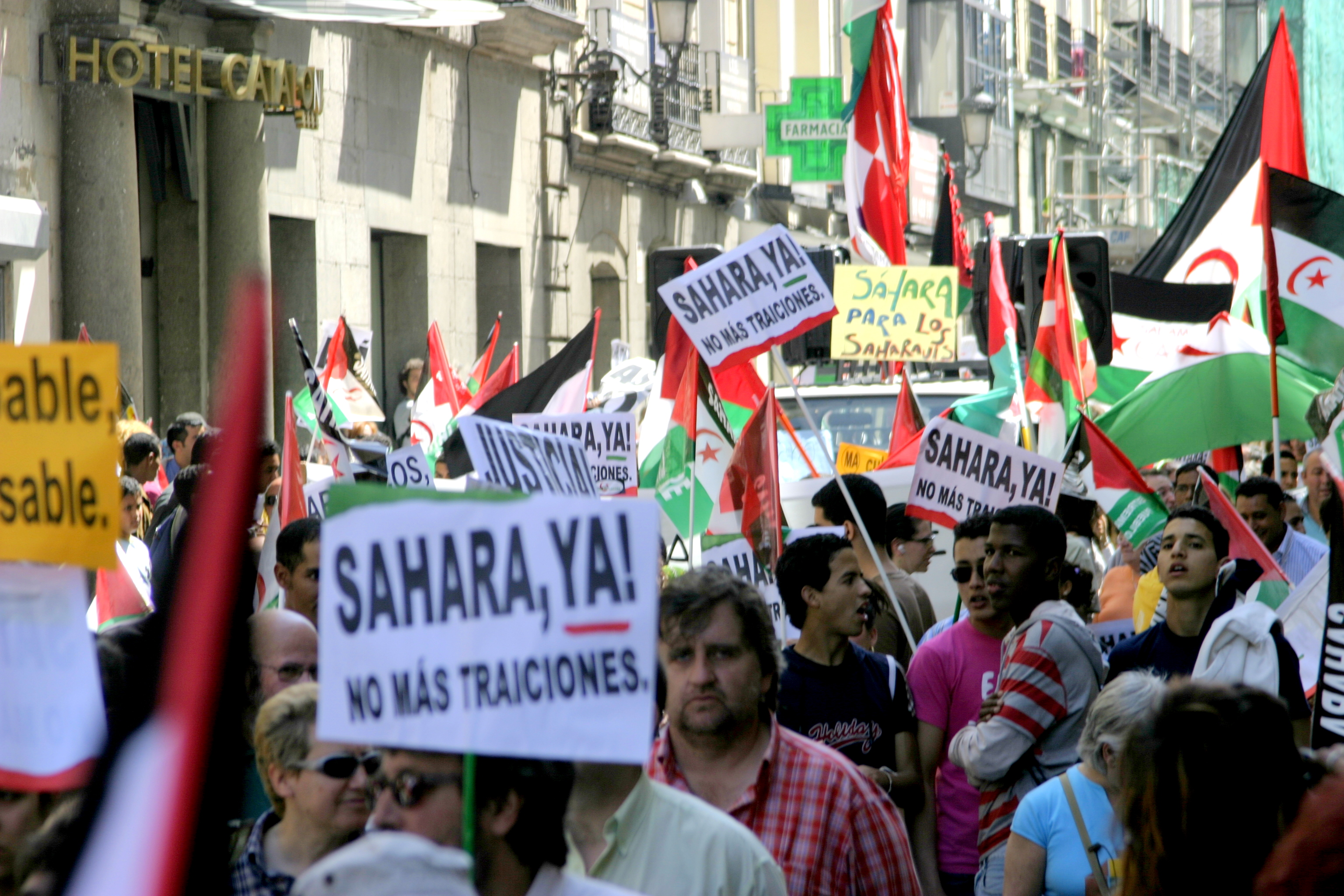
A demonstration in Madrid for the independence of Western Sahara

Demonstrations and protests still occur, even after Morocco declared in February 2006 that it was contemplating a plan for devolving a limited variant of autonomy to the territory but still explicitly refused any referendum on independence. As of January 2007, the plan had not been made public, though the Moroccan government claimed that it was more or less complete.

Polisario has intermittently threatened to resume fighting, referring to the Moroccan refusal of a referendum as a breach of the cease-fire terms, but most observers seem to consider armed conflict unlikely without the green light from Algeria, which houses the Sahrawis' refugee camps and has been the main military sponsor of the movement.

In April 2007, the government of Morocco suggested that a self-governing entity, through the CORCAS, should govern the territory with some degree of autonomy for Western Sahara. The project was presented to the UN Security Council in mid-April 2007. The stalemating of the Moroccan proposal options has led the UN in the recent "Report of the UN Secretary-General" to ask the parties to enter into direct and unconditional negotiations to reach a mutually accepted political solution.

=== 2010s ===
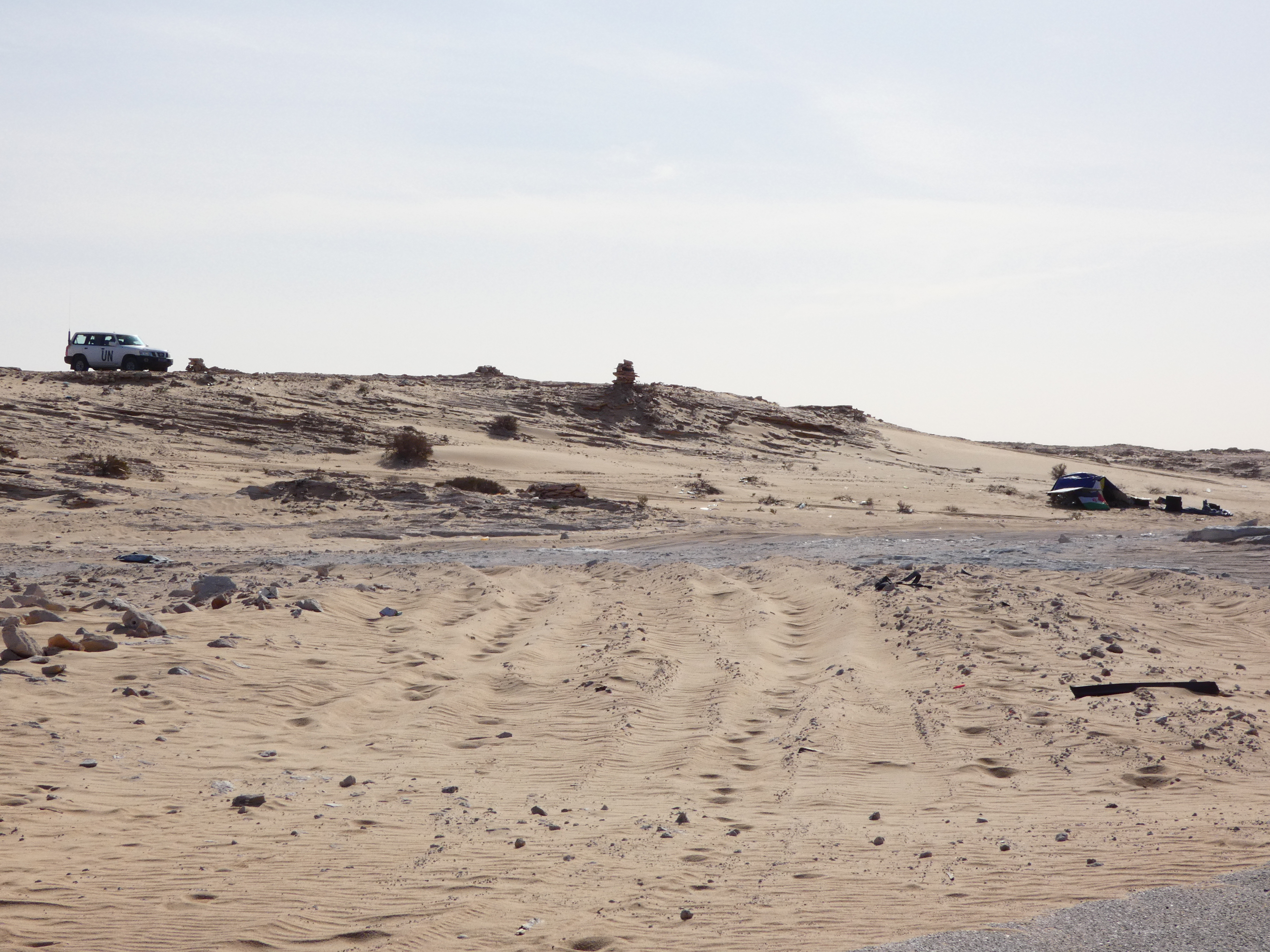
A MINURSO car (left), and a post of the Polisario Front (right) in 2017 in southern Western Sahara

In October 2010, Gadaym Izik camp was set up near Laayoune as a protest by displaced Sahrawi people about their living conditions. It was home to more than 12,000 people. In November 2010, Moroccan security forces entered Gadaym Izik camp in the early hours of the morning, using helicopters and water cannon to force people to leave. The Polisario Front said Moroccan security forces had killed a 26-year-old protester at the camp, a claim denied by Morocco. Protesters in Laayoune threw stones at police and set fire to tires and vehicles. Several buildings, including a TV station, were also set on fire. Moroccan officials said five security personnel had been killed in the unrest.

On 15 November 2010, the Moroccan government accused the Algerian secret services of orchestrating and financing the Gadaym Izik camp with the intent to destabilize the region. The Spanish press was accused of mounting a campaign of disinformation to support the Sahrawi initiative, and all foreign reporters were either prevented from traveling or else expelled from the area. The protest coincided with a fresh round of negotiations at the UN.

In 2016, the European Union (EU) declared that "Western Sahara is not part of Moroccan territory." In March 2016, Morocco "expelled more than 70 U.N. civilian staffers with MINURSO" due to strained relations after Ban Ki-moon called Morocco's annexation of Western Sahara an "occupation".

=== 2020s ===
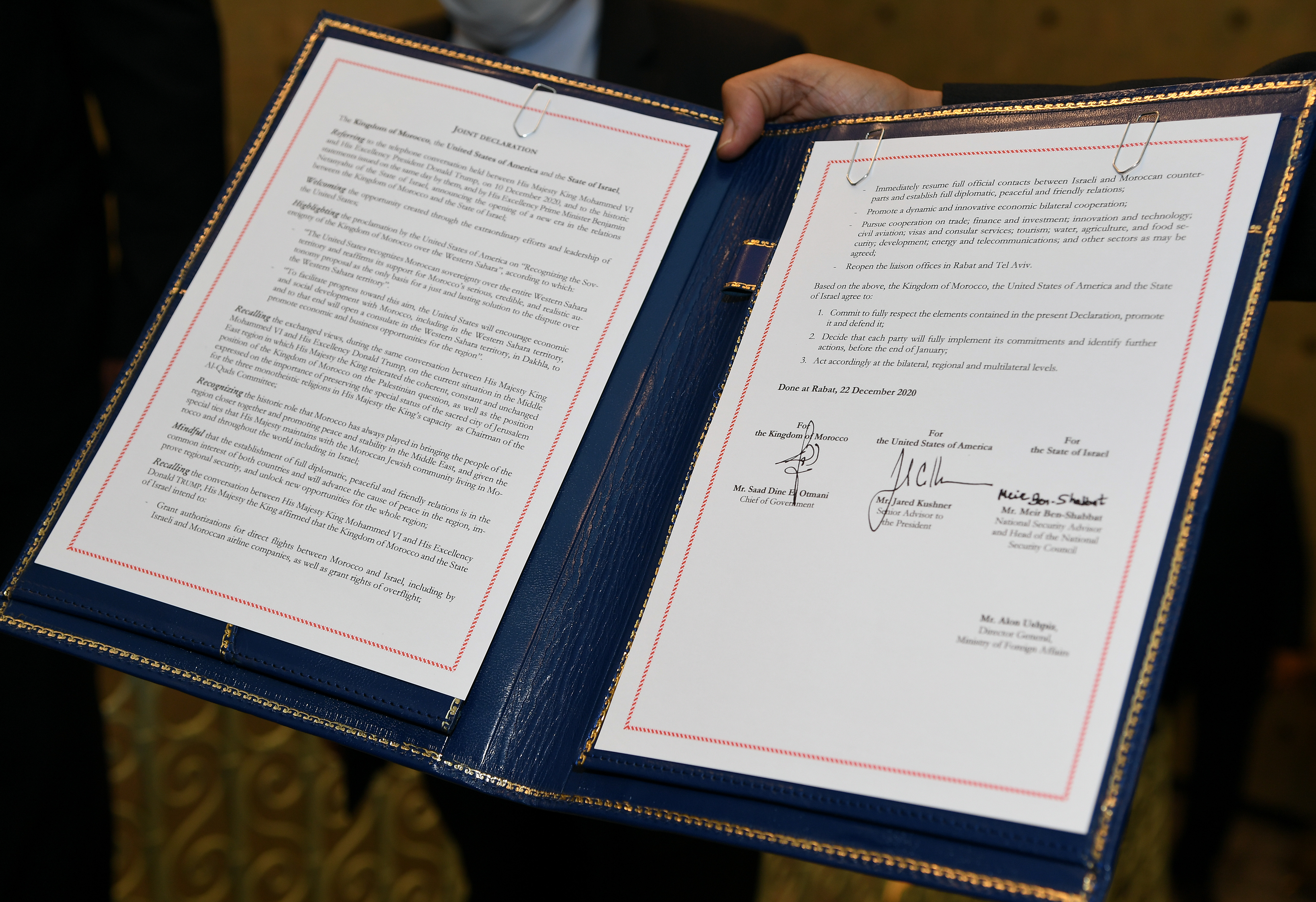
As part of the Israel–Morocco normalization agreement, the United States became the first state to recognize Moroccan sovereignty over Western Sahara.

The 2020s have seen a diplomatic shift in favor of Morocco, with several African states opening consulates accredited to Morocco in Western Sahara, implying de facto recognition. Even so, the Polisario Front has seen limited victories in cases brought before the African Court and the European Court of Justice. In November 2020, the ceasefire between the Polisario Front and Morocco broke down, leading to ongoing armed clashes between both sides.

On 10 December 2020, the United States announced that it would recognize full Moroccan sovereignty over Western Sahara in exchange for Morocco normalizing relations with Israel with a view for subsequent establishment of diplomatic relations. Following this, Israel officially recognized Moroccan sovereignty over Western Sahara in July 2023.

In February 2021, Morocco proposed to Spain the creation of an autonomy for Western Sahara under the sovereignty of the King of Morocco. In March 2022, the Spanish government abandoned its traditional position of neutrality in the conflict, siding with the Moroccan government and recognizing the autonomy proposal "as the most serious, realistic and credible basis for the resolution of the dispute". This sudden turnaround was generally rejected by both the Opposition, the parties that make up the government coalition, the Polisario Front, as well as members of the governing party, who support a solution "that respects the democratic will of the Saharawi people".

In October 2024, in a speech to the Parliament of Morocco, French President Emmanuel Macron backed Morocco's autonomy proposal. Macron also unveiled a €25 million ($27 million) investment in Guelmim-Oued Noun, which includes part of the Western Sahara. In June 2025, UK Foreign Secretary David Lammy stated that Morocco's plan for autonomy in Western Sahara represented "the most credible, viable and pragmatic" solution to the conflict. In July 2025, the Copernicus Programme corrected its cartography, separating Morocco from Western Sahara.

In October 2025, the United Nations Security Council referenced Morocco's autonomy proposal as a basis for negotiations "with a view to achieving a just, lasting and mutually acceptable resolution to the dispute, consistent with the UN Charter" and welcomed "any constructive suggestions by the parties in response to the Autonomy Proposal". The resolution recognised that "genuine autonomy could represent a most feasible outcome" and encouraged the parties to submit ideas to support "a final mutually acceptable solution".

On 30 October 2026, the United Nations Security Council failed to renew the MINURSO's mandate, leading to the peacekeeping mission dissolving after 35 years. Despite being a routine vote in previous years, the Council failed to agree on MINURSO's future due to contentions over Morocco's autonomy proposal, with both the United States and Russia exercising their veto power. The US submitted a proposal, vetoed by Russia, which enshrined the autonomy proposal as the sole basis for future negotiations, as well as weakening the missions military component. US proposals would have removed "referendum" from the mission's name, rendering simply as the "United Nations Mission in Western Sahara" - thus removing its aim of a future referendum on Sahrawi independence. Russia then proposed extending the mission for an additional year with no changes to its terms, which the US vetoed. With no mandate going forward, the MINURSO was officially disbanded on 1 November.

Following this, on 10 November, the Polisario Front declared a general mobilisation in response to alleged Moroccan military buildup at the The Berm. The decision came after an emergency meeting of The National Secretariat of the Polisario Front with its chair and Sahrawi Arab Democratic Republic President, Brahim Ghali, called on the UN and African Union to condemn Moroccan "expansionism".

== Geography ==
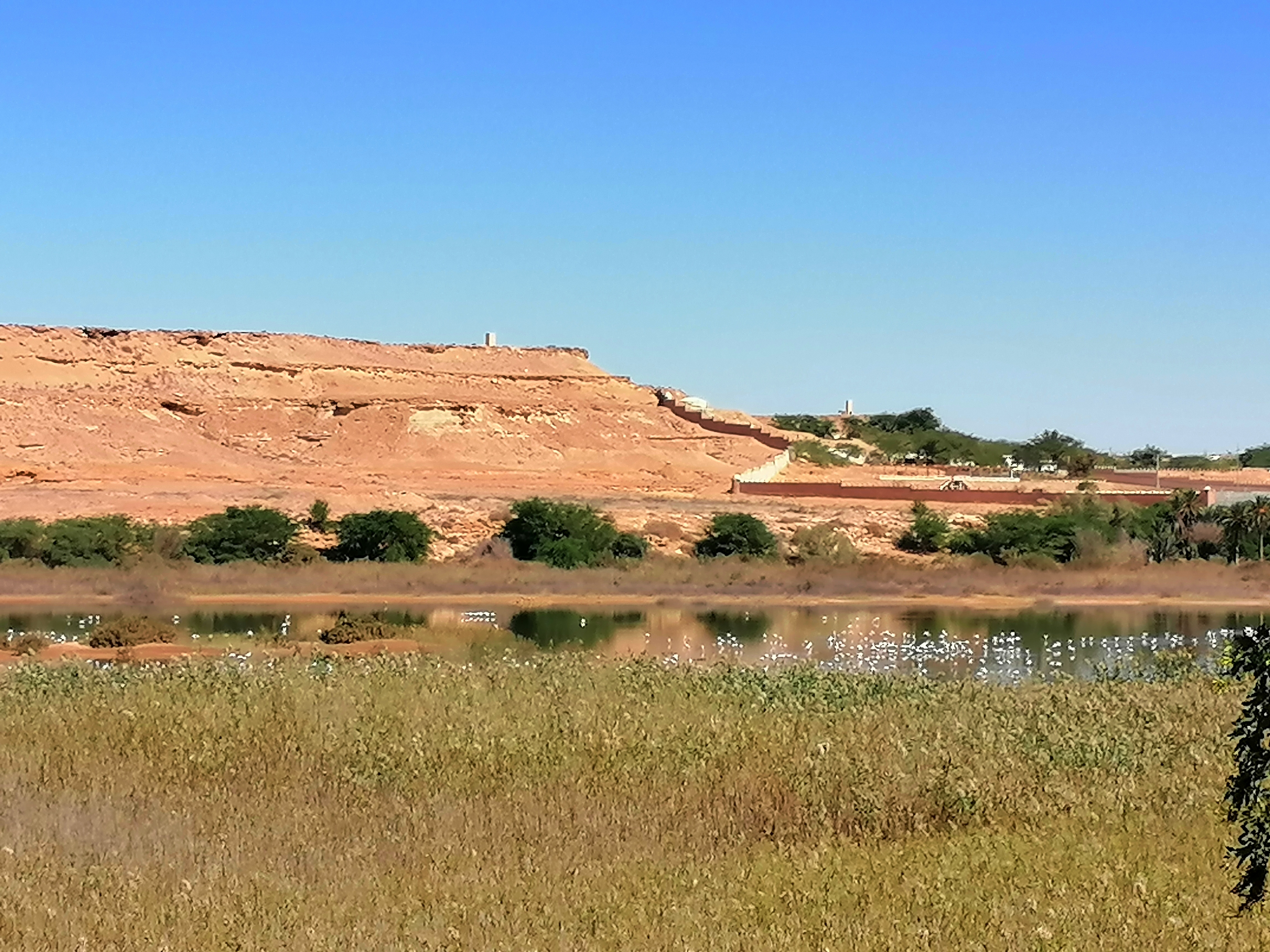
Intermittent lake Dait Um Saad

Western Sahara is located on the north-west coast in West Africa and on the cusp of North Africa, bordering the North Atlantic Ocean to the northwest, Morocco to the north-northeast, Algeria to the east-northeast, and Mauritania to the east and south.

Among the most arid and inhospitable on the planet, the land along the coast is low flat desert and rises, especially in the north, to small mountains reaching up to 600 metres (2,000 ft) on the eastern side.

While the area can experience flash flooding in the spring, there are no permanent streams. At times, a cool off-shore current can produce fog and heavy dew.

The interior experiences extreme summer heat, with average highs reaching 43–45 °C (109–113 °F) in July and in August; during winter, days are still hot to very hot, with average highs from 25 to 30 °C (77 to 86 °F); however, in the northern part of the territory, the thermometer may drop below 0 °C (32 °F) at night and it can be freezing in December and in January, although this is rare.

Western Sahara contains four terrestrial ecoregions: Saharan halophytics, Mediterranean acacia-argania dry woodlands and succulent thickets, Atlantic coastal desert, and North Saharan steppe and woodlands.

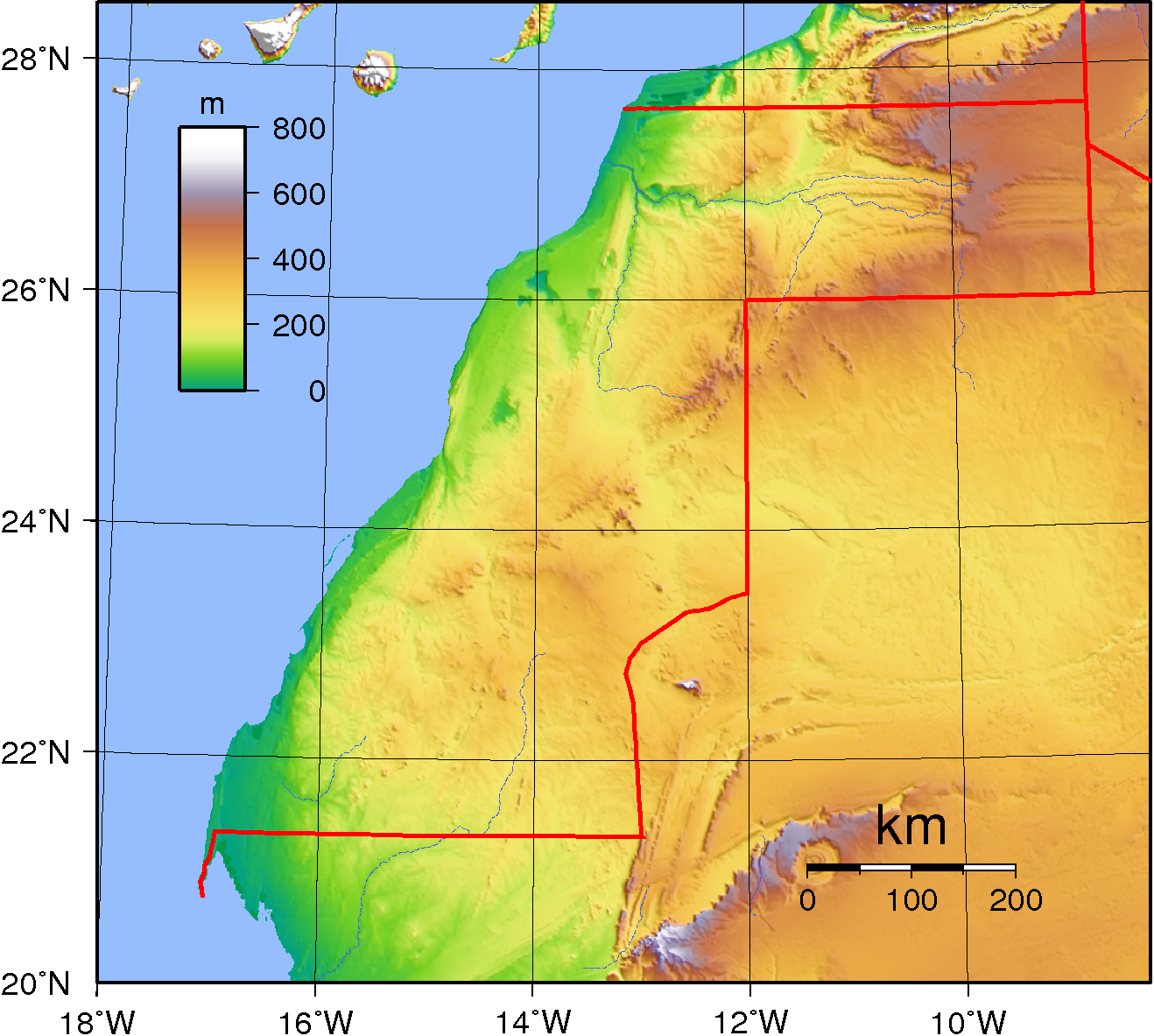
Topography of Western Sahara

== Government and politics ==
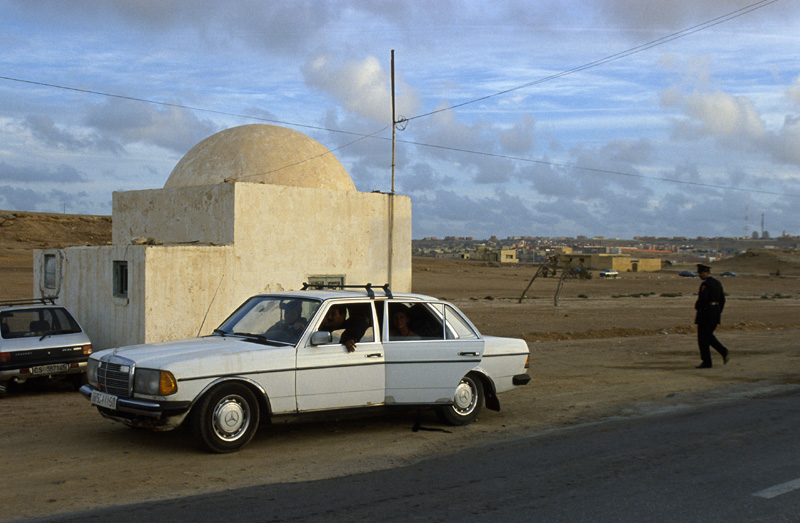
A Moroccan police checkpoint in the suburbs of Laayoune

Sovereignty over Western Sahara is contested between Morocco and the Polisario Front and its legal status remains unresolved. The United Nations considers it to be a "non-self-governing territory".

Formally, Morocco is administered by a bicameral parliament under a constitutional monarchy wherein the monarch retains significant powers, such as the capacity to appoint the government and to dissolve parliament. The last elections to the parliament's lower house were deemed reasonably free and fair by international observers. The Morocco-occupied parts of Western Sahara are divided into several provinces that are treated as integral parts of the kingdom. The Moroccan government heavily subsidizes the Saharan provinces under its occupation with cut-rate fuel and related subsidies, to appease nationalist dissent and attract immigrants from Sahrawis and other communities in Morocco proper.

The exiled government of the self-proclaimed Sahrawi Arab Democratic Republic (SADR) is a form of single-party parliamentary and presidential system, but according to its constitution, this will be changed into a multi-party system at the achievement of independence. It is presently based at the Tindouf refugee camps in Algeria, which it controls. It also controls the part of Western Sahara to the east of the Moroccan Wall, known as the liberated territories. This area has a very small population, estimated to be approximately 30,000 nomads. The Moroccan government views it as a no-man's land patrolled by UN troops. The SADR government whose troops also patrol the area have proclaimed a village in the area, Bir Lehlou and Tifariti, as SADR's former and actual temporary factual capitals.

On 18 December 2019, the Comoros became the first nation to open a consulate in Laayoune in support of Moroccan claims to Western Sahara. In January 2020, The Gambia and Guinea opened consulates in Dakhla; meanwhile, Gabon opened a consulate general in Laayoune. As part of the Moroccan-Israeli normalisation deal, the United States established a temporary consulate post in Dakhla in January 2021 as a transition to establishing a permanent consulate within the near future.

=== Administrative divisions ===
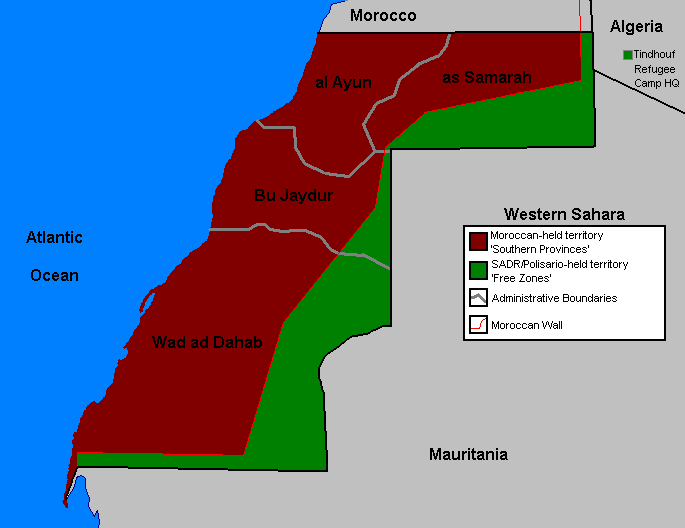
Image showing Western Sahara divided between the Moroccan-held area (in red) and the SADR-held area (in green).

==== Sahrawi Arab Democratic Republic ====
The SADR has two levels of notional administrative division:

- 4 provinces (wilayat), named after the national capitals: Aousserd, Dakhla, Laayoune, and Smara
- 25 districts (daerah)

==== Moroccan regions and provinces ====
Three Moroccan regions are within or partly within Western Sahara:

- Guelmim-Oued Noun Region
  Assa-Zag Province
- Laâyoune-Sakia El Hamra Region
  Boujdour Province
  Es Semara Province
  Laâyoune Province
  Tarfaya Province
- Dakhla-Oued Ed-Dahab Region
  Aousserd Province
  Oued Eddahab Province

Approximately 30% of the Western Sahara is controlled by the Polisario Front and the remaining 70% is occupied by Morocco. Morocco occupies territory to the west of the berm (border wall) while the Sahrawi Republic controls territory to the east (see map on right).

=== Human rights ===
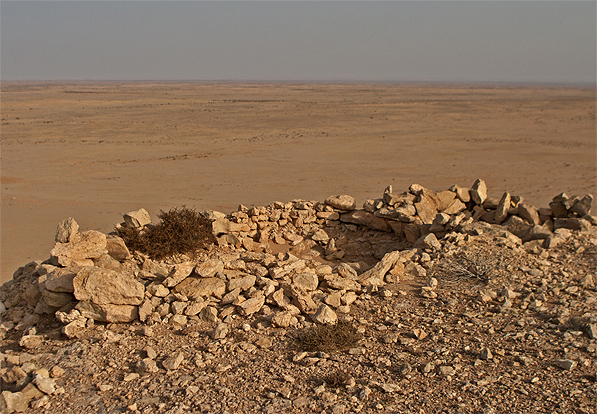
A sangar (fortification) from the Western Sahara conflict. The fortification is built of rocks on top of a mesa overlooking the Grart Chwchia, Al Gada, Western Sahara. The Sangar is facing north and was probably built by the Sahrawis in the 1980s.

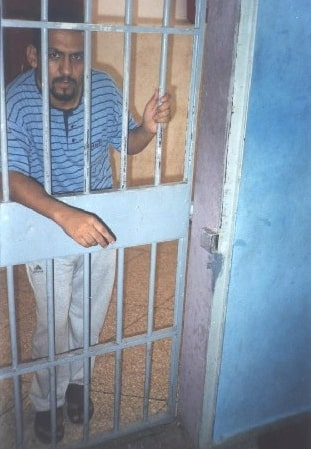
Sahrawi human rights defender Ali Salem Tamek in Ait Meloul Prison, Morocco

The Western Sahara conflict has resulted in severe human-rights abuses, constantly reported by external reporters and human rights activists, most notably the displacement of tens of thousands of Sahrawi civilians from the country, the expulsion of tens of thousands of Moroccan civilians by the Algerian government from Algeria, and numerous casualties of war and repression.

During the war years (1975–1991), both sides accused each other of targeting civilians. Moroccan claims of Polisario terrorism have generally had little to no support abroad, with the US, European Union, African Union and UN all refusing to include the group on their lists of terrorist organizations. Polisario leaders maintain that they are ideologically opposed to terrorism, and insist that collective punishment and forced disappearances among Sahrawi civilians should be considered state terrorism on the part of Morocco. Both Morocco and the Polisario additionally accuse each other of violating the human rights of the populations under their control, in the Moroccan-occupied parts of Western Sahara and the Tindouf refugee camps in Algeria, respectively. Morocco and organizations such as France Libertés consider Algeria to be directly responsible for any crimes committed on its territory, and accuse the country of having been directly involved in such violations.

Morocco has been repeatedly criticized for its actions in Western Sahara by international human rights organizations including:

- Amnesty International
- Human Rights Watch
- World Organization Against Torture
- Freedom House
- Reporters Without Borders
- International Committee of the Red Cross
- UN High Commissioner for Human Rights
- Derechos Human Rights
- Defend International
- Front Line
- International Federation for Human Rights
- Society for Threatened Peoples
- Norwegian Refugee Council

The Polisario Front has received criticism from the French organization France Libertes on its treatment of Moroccan prisoners of war, and on its general behaviour in the Tindouf refugee camps in reports by the Belgian commercial counseling society ESISC. Social anthropologist of the Sahara Desert, Konstantina Isidoros, said that in both 2005 and 2008, ESISC issued two near-identical reports proclaiming distorted truths that Polisario is evolving to new fears terrorism, radical Islamism or international crime. According to Isidoros "lies appear to play some peculiar importance in this report". Jacob Mundi considers this report as a part of the Moroccan propaganda designed to discredit the Polisario Front.

A number of former Polisario officials who have defected to Morocco accuse the organization of abuse of human rights and sequestration of the population in Tindouf.

=== Dispute ===
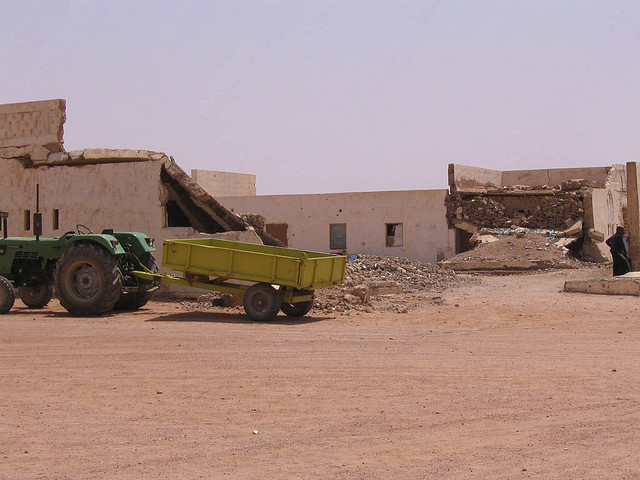
Remains of the former Spanish barracks in Tifariti after the Moroccan airstrikes in 1991

Western Sahara was partitioned between Morocco and Mauritania in April 1976, with Morocco acquiring the northern two-thirds of the territory. When Mauritania, under pressure from Polisario guerrillas, abandoned all claims to its portion in August 1979, Morocco moved to occupy that sector shortly thereafter and has since asserted administrative control over the whole territory. The official Moroccan government name for Western Sahara is the "Southern Provinces", consisting of the Río de Oro and Saguia el-Hamra regions.

The portion not under the occupation of the Moroccan government is the area that lies between the border wall and the actual border with Algeria and Mauritania. The Polisario Front claims to run this as the Free Zone on behalf of the SADR. The area is patrolled by Polisario forces, and access is restricted, even among Sahrawis, due to the harsh climate of the Sahara, the military conflict and the abundance of land mines. Landmine Action UK undertook preliminary survey work by visiting the Polisario-controlled area of Western Sahara in October 2005 and February–March 2006. A field assessment in the vicinity of Bir Lahlou, Tifariti and the berms revealed that the densest concentrations of mines are in front of the berms. Mines were laid in zigzags up to one meter apart, and in some parts of the berms, there are three rows of mines. There are also berms in the Moroccan-occupied zone, around Dakhla and stretching from Boujdour, including Smara on the Moroccan border. Mine-laying was not restricted to the vicinity of the berms though, as towns throughout the Polisario-controlled areas, such as Bir Lehlou and Tifariti, are ringed by mines laid by Moroccan forces.

Despite this, the area is traveled and inhabited by many Sahrawi nomads from the Tindouf refugee camps of Algeria and the Sahrawi communities in Mauritania. United Nations MINURSO forces are also present in the area. The UN forces oversee the cease-fire between Polisario and Morocco agreed upon in the 1991 Settlement Plan.

The Polisario forces of the Sahrawi People's Liberation Army (SPLA) in the area are divided into seven "military regions", each controlled by a top commander reporting to the President of the proclaimed republic. The total size of the Polisario's guerrilla army present in this area is unknown, but it is believed to number a few thousand men, despite many combatants being demobilized due to the cease-fire.

Major Sahrawi political events, such as Polisario congresses and sessions of the Sahrawi National Council (the SADR parliament in exile) are held in the Free Zone (especially in Tifariti and Bir Lehlou), since it is politically and symbolically important to conduct political affairs on Sahrawi territory. In 2005, MINURSO lodged a complaint to the Security Council of the United Nations for "military maneuvers with real fire which extends to restricted areas" by Morocco. A concentration of forces for the commemoration of the Saharawi Republic's 30th anniversary were subject to condemnation by the United Nations, as it was considered an example of a cease-fire violation to bring such a large force concentration into the area. In late 2009, Moroccan troops performed military maneuvers near Umm Dreiga, in the exclusion zone, violating the cease-fire. Both parties have been accused of such violations by the UN, but to date there has been no serious hostile action from either side since 1991.

UN sponsored peace talks, the first in six years between Morocco and Polisario, were held in Geneva on 5 December 2018, with both sides agreeing to meet again in a few months for further talks.

During the joint Moroccan–Mauritanian occupation of the area, the Mauritanian-occupied part, roughly corresponding to Saquia el-Hamra, was known as Tiris al-Gharbiyya.

== Economy ==
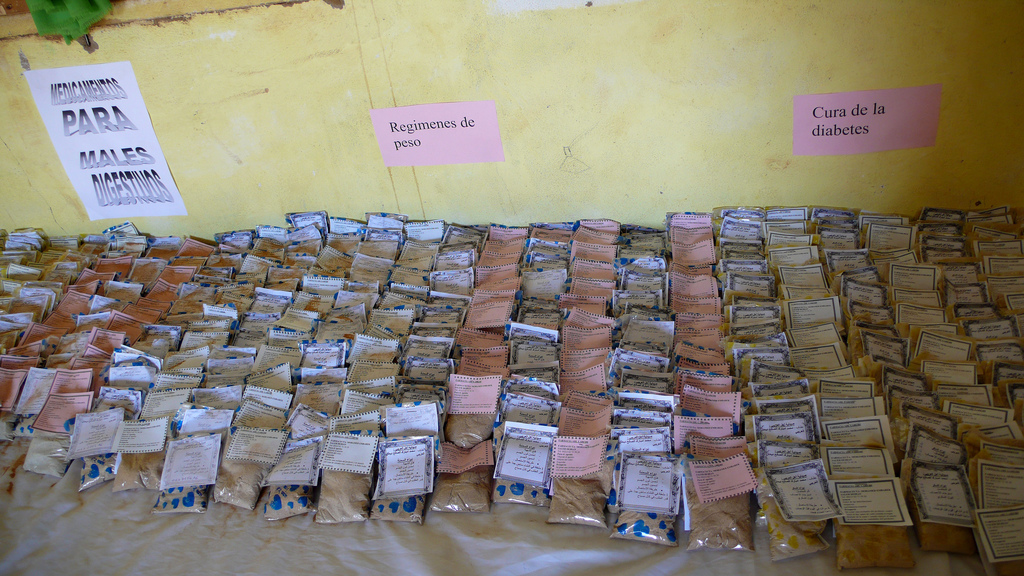
Natural products in a pharmacy

Aside from its rich fishing waters and phosphate reserves, Western Sahara has few natural resources and lacks sufficient rainfall and freshwater resources for most agricultural activities. There is speculation that there may be off-shore oil and natural gas fields, but the debate persists as to whether these resources can be profitably exploited, and if this would be legally permitted due to the non-self-governing status of Western Sahara (see below).

Western Sahara's phosphate mine at Bou Craa produces approximately 10% of Morocco's annual phosphate output. This mine has the longest conveyor belt in the world, at 98 km (61 mi). However, these reserves represent less than 2% of proven phosphate reserves in Morocco.

Western Sahara's economy is based almost entirely on fishing, which employs two-thirds of its workforce, with mining, agriculture and tourism providing modest additional income. Most food for the urban population comes from Morocco. All trade and other economic activities are controlled by the Moroccan government (as its de facto southern province). The government has encouraged citizens to relocate to the territory by giving subsidies and price controls on basic goods. These heavy subsidies have created a state-dominated economy in the Moroccan-occupied parts of Western Sahara.

Due to the disputed nature of Moroccan sovereignty over the territory, the application of international accords to Western Sahara is highly ambiguous. Political leadership of trade agreement signatories such as the United States (US-Morocco Free Trade Agreement) and Norway (European Free Trade Association trade accord) have made statements as to these agreements' non-applicability – although practical policy application is ambiguous.

In 2024, the European Court of Justice ruled that products harvested in Western Sahara and imported into the European Union must be labeled with their territory of origin, rather than as Moroccan.

=== Exploitation of natural resources ===
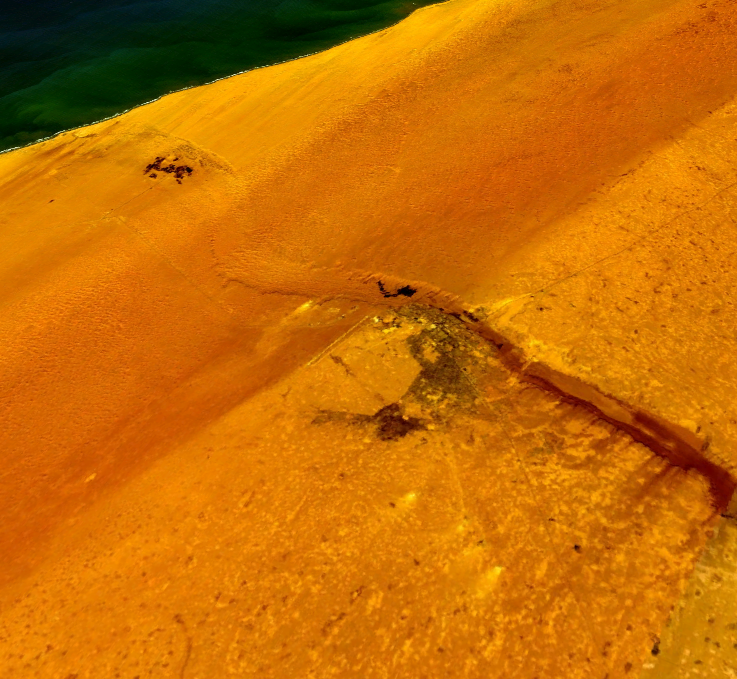
Satellite image of Laayoune

After reasonably exploitable oil fields were located in Mauritania, speculation intensified on the possibility of major oil resources being located off the coast of Western Sahara. Despite the fact that findings remain inconclusive, both Morocco and the Polisario have signed deals with oil and gas exploration companies. US and French companies (notably TotalEnergies and Kerr-McGee) began prospecting on behalf of the Moroccan Office National de Recherches et d'Exploitations Petrolières (ONAREP).

In 2002, Hans Corell, Under-Secretary General of the United Nations and head of its Office of Legal Affairs, issued a legal opinion on the matter. The opinion was rendered following an analysis of relevant provisions of the Charter of the United Nations, the United Nations General Assembly resolutions, the case law of the International Court of Justice and the practice of sovereign states. It concluded that while the existing exploration contracts for the area were not illegal, "if further exploration and exploitation activities were to proceed in disregard of the interests and wishes of the people of Western Sahara, they would be in violation of the principles of international law." After pressures from corporate ethics-groups, TotalEnergies pulled out in late 2004.

In May 2006, the remaining company, Kerr-McGee, also left, following sales of numerous shareholders like the National Norwegian Oil Fund, due to continued pressure from NGOs and corporate groups.

In December 2014, it became known that Seabird Exploration operated controversial seismic surveys offshore Western Sahara, in violation of the 2002 Hans Corell legal opinion.

The European Union fishing agreements with Morocco include Western Sahara.

In a previously confidential legal opinion (published in February 2010, although it was forwarded in July 2009), the European Parliament's Legal Service opined that fishing by European vessels under a current EU–Morocco fishing agreement covering Western Sahara's waters is in violation of international law.

Similarly, the exploitation of phosphate mines in Bou Craa has led to charges of international law violations and divestment from several European states.

== Demographics ==
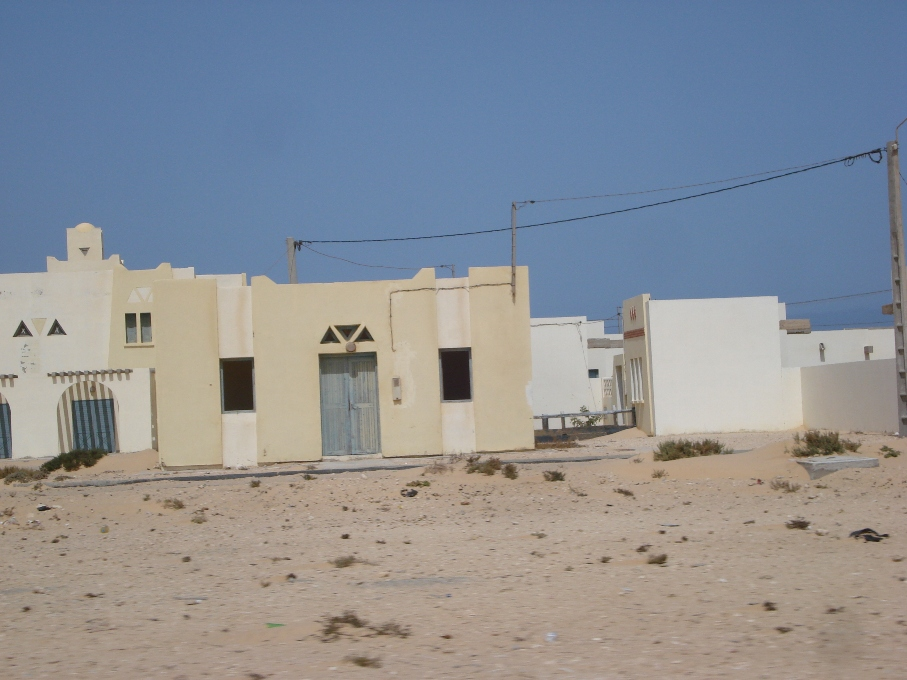
Morocco built several empty towns in Western Sahara, ready for refugees returning from Tindouf.

The indigenous population of Western Sahara is usually known in Western media as Sahrawis, but they are also referred to in Morocco as "Southerners" or "Southern Berbers". They are Hassaniya-speaking or Berber-speaking tribes of Berber origin (97% of Y-DNA). Many of them have mixed Berber-Arab heritage, effectively continuations of the tribal groupings of Hassaniya-speaking and Zenaga-Berber speaking Moorish tribes extending south into Mauritania and north into Morocco as well as east into Algeria. The Sahrawis are traditionally nomadic Bedouins with a lifestyle very similar to that of the Tuareg Berbers from whom Sahrawis most likely have descended, and they can be found in all surrounding countries. War and conflict has led to major population displacement.

As of July 2004, an estimated 267,405 people (excluding about 160,000 Moroccan military personnel) lived in the Moroccan-occupied parts of Western Sahara. Many people from parts of Morocco have come to settle in the territory, and these latest arrivals are today thought to outnumber the indigenous Western Sahara Sahrawis. The precise size and composition of the population is subject to political controversy.

The Polisario-controlled parts of Western Sahara are barren. This area has a sparse population, estimated to be less than 10,000 inhabitants. The population is primarily made up of nomads who engage in herding camels back and forth between the Tindouf area and Mauritania. The presence of land mines scattered throughout the territory by the Moroccan army makes this a dangerous way of life.

=== Spanish census and MINURSO ===
A 1974 Spanish census claimed there were some 74,000 Sahrawis in the area at the time (in addition to approximately 20,000 Spanish residents), but this number is likely to be on the low side, due to the difficulty in counting a nomad people, even if Sahrawis were by the mid-1970s mostly urbanized. Despite these possible inaccuracies, Morocco and the Polisario Front agreed on using the Spanish census as the basis for voter registration when striking a cease-fire agreement in the late 1980s, contingent on the holding of a referendum on independence or integration into Morocco.

In December 1999, the United Nations' MINURSO mission announced that it had identified 86,425 eligible voters for the referendum that was supposed to be held under the 1991 Settlement plan and the 1997 Houston accords. By "eligible voter" the UN referred to any Sahrawi over 18 years of age that was part of the Spanish census or could prove their descent from someone who was. These 86,425 Sahrawis were dispersed between Moroccan-occupied Western Sahara and the refugee camps in Algeria, with smaller numbers in Mauritania and other places of exile. These numbers cover only Sahrawis "indigenous" to Western Sahara during the Spanish colonial period, not the total number of "ethnic" Sahrawis (i.e., members of Sahrawi tribal groupings), who also extend into Mauritania, Morocco and Algeria. The number was highly politically significant due to the expected organization of a referendum on self-determination.

The Polisario has its home base in the Tindouf refugee camps in Algeria, and declares the number of Sahrawi population in the camps to be approximately 155,000. Morocco disputes this number, saying it is exaggerated for political reasons and for attracting more foreign aid. The UN uses a number of 90,000 "most vulnerable" refugees as basis for its food aid program.

== Culture ==
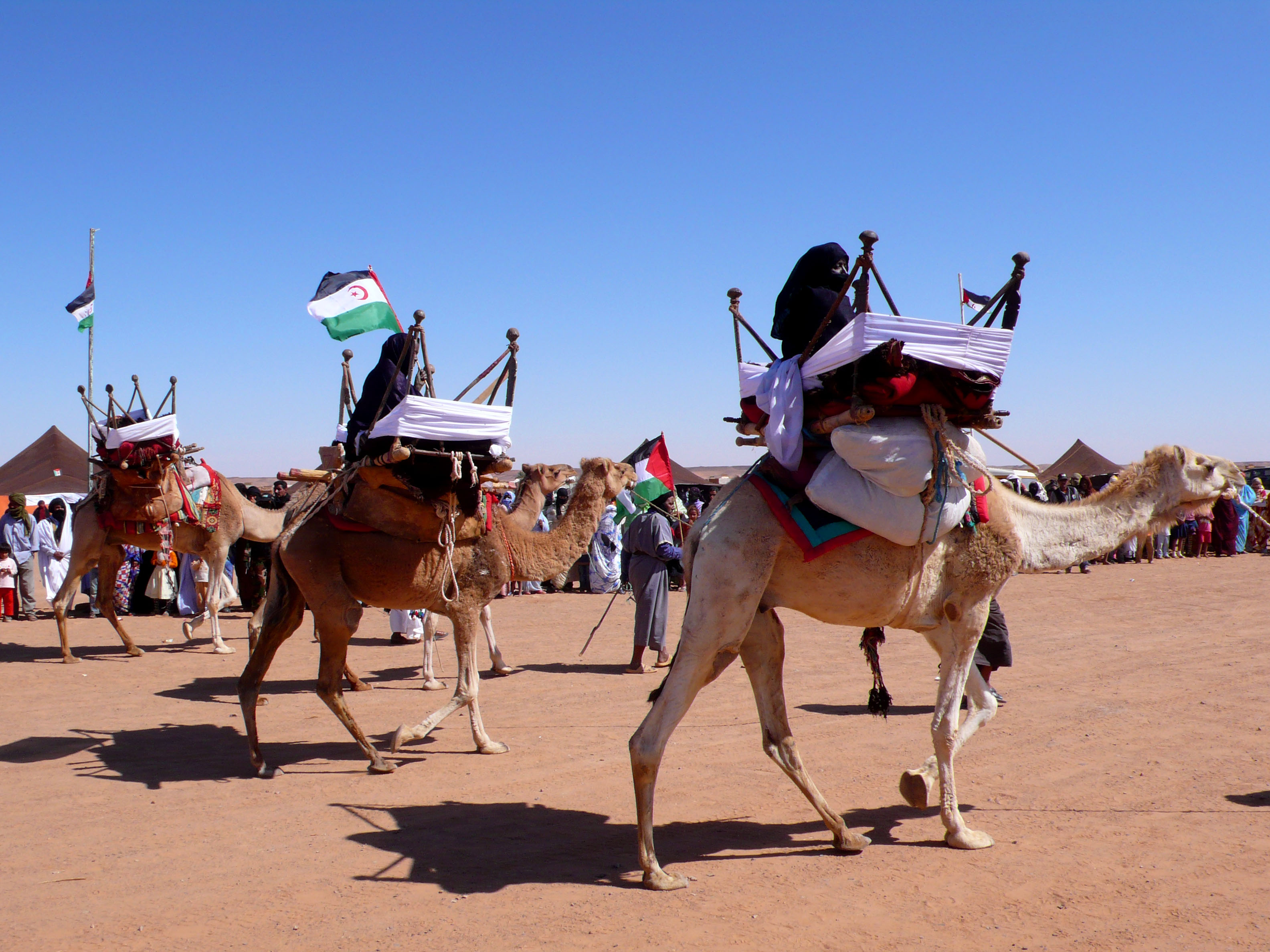
Sahrawi people

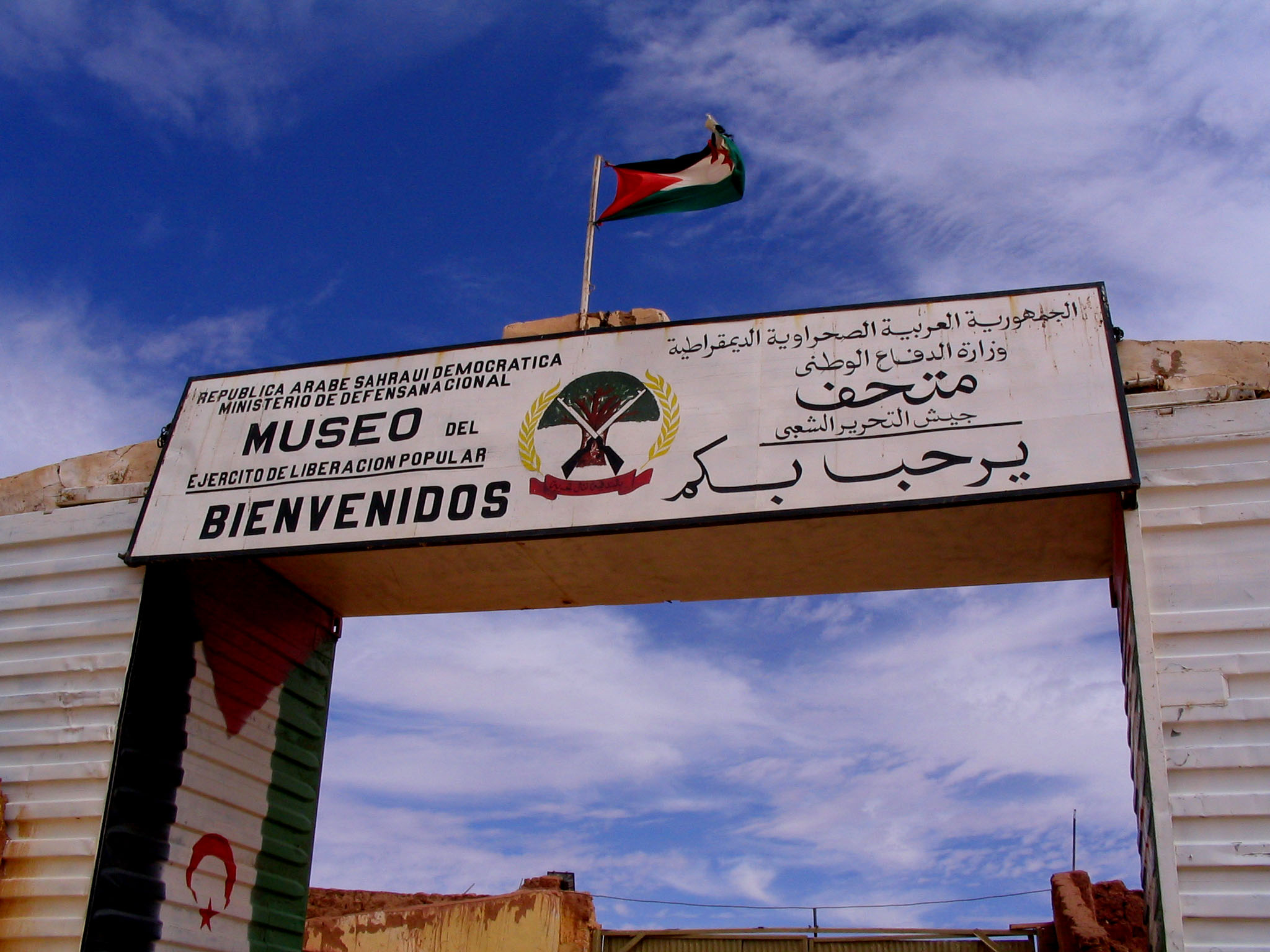
Museum of the Sahrawi People's Liberation Army

The major ethnic group of Western Sahara are the Sahrawis, a nomadic or Bedouin ethnic group speaking the Hassānīya dialect of Arabic, also spoken in much of Mauritania. They are of mixed Arab-Berber descent, but claim descent from the Beni Hassan, an Arab tribe that migrated across the desert in the 11th century.

Like other Saharan Bedouin and Hassaniya groups, the Sahrawis are all Muslims of the Sunni branch and the Maliki fiqh. Local religious custom (Urf) is, like other Saharan groups, heavily influenced by pre-Islamic Berber and African practices, and differs substantially from urban practices. For example, Sahrawi Islam has traditionally functioned without mosques, in an adaptation to nomadic life.

The original clan-tribe-based society underwent a massive social upheaval in 1975 when the war forced part of the population to settle in the refugee camps of Tindouf, Algeria, where they remain. Families were broken up by the dispute.

The Museum of the Sahrawi People's Liberation Army is located in this refugee camp. This museum is dedicated to the struggle for the independence of Western Saharan people. It presents weapons, vehicles and uniforms, as well as abundant documentation history.

=== Cross-cultural influence ===
The contemporary history of the territory has experienced long-term international presence and occupation that has deeply influenced the cultural practices of the people, such as languages spoken throughout the territory and its institutions. Spanish colonization lasted roughly from 1884 to 1976, following the creation of the Madrid Accords where Spain absolved all responsibility over the territory and left it to Morocco and Mauritania.

Throughout the nine decades of Spanish colonial presence, one of the primary spoken languages in Western Sahara came to be Spanish. The reasons for its widespread usage was due to the necessity of communicating with Spanish leadership and administrators throughout the territory, who ultimately established institutions modeled after those of Spain. The importance and prevalence of Spanish has persisted to the present day, even after Spanish withdrawal from Western Sahara in 1976, due to various education exchanges and host programs for Sahrawi children to Spain and Cuba.

One such exchange program to Spain is Vacaciones en Paz (Vacations in Peace), which is an annual holiday program that was created in 1988 and is organized by the Union of Sahrawi Youth (UJSARIO) in collaboration with 300 other associations throughout Spain. The program itself allows 7,000 to 10,000 Sahrawi children between the ages of 8 and 12 the opportunity to live in Spain for the summer outside of the refugee camps. Sometimes children return to the same Spanish household year after year while they are still eligible, and forge strong relationships with their host families. These types of exchange programs that successfully create cross-border and cross-cultural relationships reinforce the usage of the Spanish language throughout subsequent generations of Sahrawi children.

=== Gender relations ===
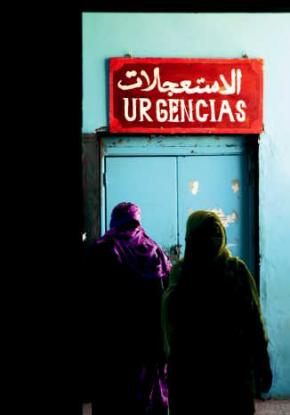
Two women outside a hospital emergencies at a Sahrawi refugee camps

Much Spanish literature and recent refugee studies scholarship has been dedicated to the exploration of the major role women play in Sahrawi society, and the degree of freedom they experience within the occupied territory and the refugee camps. There is a consensus among Sahrawi women that they have always enjoyed a large degree of freedom and influence within the Sahrawi community.

Traditionally, women have played pivotal roles in Sahrawi culture, as well as in efforts to resist colonialism and foreign interference in their territory. Similar to other nomadic traditions on the African continent, Sahrawi women traditionally exercised significant power and roles both in the camp and in their tents.

Sahrawi women could inherit property, and subsist independently from their fathers, brothers, husbands, and other male relatives. Women were key for establishing alliances through marriage, being that the Sahrawi culture values monogamy, with their tribe and to others. Furthermore, Sahrawi women were endowed with major responsibility for the camp during long periods of absence by the men of the camp due to war or trade. Among the responsibilities women had were setting up, repairing, and moving the tents of the camp, and participating in major tribal decisions.

In the contemporary history of Western Sahara, women have occupied central roles and been highly represented in the political sphere. During Spanish colonial rule, Sahrawi women actively provided financial and physical support to the resistance movements during the 1930s, 1950s, and the late 1960s. In more official ways, women were consistently part of the Polisario Front, which in 1994 created the National Union of Sahrawi Women (NUSW). The NUSW was structured at the local, regional, and national levels and concentrated on four areas: the occupied territories and emigration, information and culture, political and professional development, and foreign affairs.

=== Art and cultural expression ===
FiSahara International Film Festival is an annual film festival that takes place in one of the southwestern refugee camps in Algeria. At this event, actors, directors, and film industry insiders from around the world join the Sahrawi people for a week-long festival of screenings, parallel activities, and concerts. The festival provides entertainment and educational opportunities for Sahrawi refugees alongside cultural celebrations for visitors and spectators. It aims to raise awareness of the humanitarian crises in the refugee camps, and expose the Sahrawi people to this medium of art and expression.

Spanish filmmakers and actors, such as Javier Bardem, Penélope Cruz, and Pedro Almodóvar have supported and attended the festival. In 2013, the festival screened over 15 films from around the world including comedies, short films, animations, and documentaries. Some of the films were made by the refugees themselves. Art as embodied in film has been a strong and popular medium that Sahrawi youth have used to express themselves, and share their stories of conflict and exile.

ARTifariti, the International Art and Human Rights Meeting in Western Sahara, is an annual art workshop set up in the Liberated Zone and refugee camps, specifically in Tifariti, that brings artists from all over the world. This event led to the introduction of graffiti art to the camps, and popular graffiti artists have come to the workshop to work with refugees. One such artist was Spanish street artist MESA, who travelled to the Sahrawi refugee camps in 2011 and displayed his own graffiti throughout the landscape. His canvases of choice were destroyed walls, which he brought back to life through his art.

MESA inspired other Sahrawis to express themselves and embody their national struggle through art and graffiti. One such artist is Mohamed Sayad, a Sahrawi artist that has been transforming the refugee camp landscape by creating works of art amongst the devastation in camps that have existed for four decades. His canvases, much like MESA, are walls that have been ruined by massive floods in the Sahrawi refugee camps in southwestern Algeria. Sayad's work tells a consistent story, one that draws on his experience of protracted conflict and a life under Moroccan occupation. Sayad's graffiti depicts aspects of Sahrawi culture and includes actual Sahrawi people as his subjects.

Poetry is a popular artform in Sahrawi culture, and is composed by both men and women. Notable poets include: Al Khadra Mabrook, Hadjatu Aliat Swelm, Beyibouh El Haj. Traditionally, Sahrawi poetry was performed and passed on orally: younger poets would undergo 'apprenticeships to more experienced ones, today the internet is a key way in which Sahrawi poetry is transmitted between and within generations'. However Sahrawi poets find it difficult to be published, especially by Arabic publishers, due to the political nature of much of their output.

== See also ==
- Bibliography of Western Sahara
- List of cities in Western Sahara
- Music of Western Sahara
- Outline of the Sahrawi Arab Democratic Republic
- Telecommunications in Western Sahara
- Transport in Western Sahara
- United Nations Security Council Resolution 1979
- List of states with limited recognition
- List of national border changes since World War I
