= Seabird Exploration =

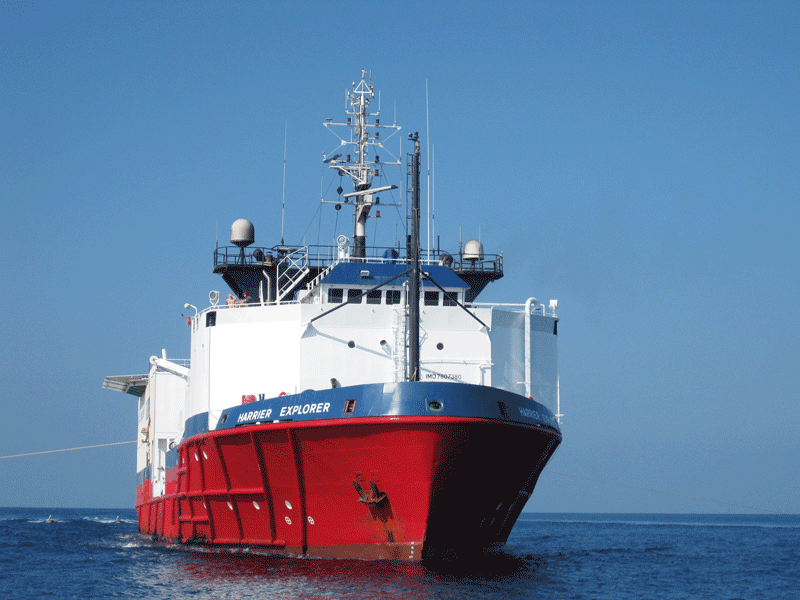
SeaBird Exploration 2D seismic vessel "Harrier Explorer"

SeaBird Exploration (OSE: SBX) is a global provider of marine 2D and 3D seismic data and associated products and services to the oil and gas industry. The Company is listed on the Oslo Stock Exchange with headquarters in Cyprus. They also have regional offices in Houston, Texas and Oslo. The company operate a fleet of six seismic vessels, specialising in long offset 2D and shallow water 3D seismic data acquisition.

During autumn 2014 it became known that Seabird Exploration operated controversial seismic surveys off the coast of Western Sahara. Moroccan oil exploration has previously been considered illegal under international law according to the UN Office of Legal Affairs. The company later apologized for its operations in Western Sahara.
