= Bibliography of Western Sahara =

This is a list of published books in English which according to reliable sources deal with the general subject of Western Sahara.

- Amnesty International – Morocco: breaking the wall of silence: the 'disappeared' of Morocco
- Amnesty International – Morocco: 'disappearances' of people of Western Sahara origin
- Anderson, Jon Lee – Guerillas: The Men and Women Fighting Today's Wars
- Arts, Karin and Pedro Pinto Leita, eds. – International Law and the Question of Western Sahara. Leiden: International Platform of Jurists for East Timor, 2007.
- Barakat, Hakim, ed. – Contemporary North Africa: Issues of Development and Integration
- Bender, Gerald J., James J. Coleman, Richard L. Sklar, eds. – African crisis areas and United States foreign policy
- Briggs, Lloyd Cabot – The Living Races of the Sahara Desert
- Briggs, Lloyd Cabot – The Tribes of the Sahara
- The British Yearbook of International Law (1978)
- Brownlie, Ian – African Boundaries: A Legal and Diplomatic Encyclopedia
- Chaliand, Gerard – The Struggle for Africa
- Chopra, Jarat – Peace-Maintenance. The Evolution of International Political Authority.
- Chopra, Jarat – United Nations determination of the Western Sahara self
- Copson, Raymond W. – Africa's Wars and Prospects for Peace
- Cottrell, Alvin J. & James Daniel Theberge, eds. – The Western Mediterranean
- Damis, John – Conflict in Northwest Africa
- Dean, David J. – The air force role in low-intensity conflict
- El-Ayouty, Yassin, ed. – The OAU after thirty years
- El-Ayouty, Yassin & I. William Zartman, eds. – The OAU after twenty years
- El Ouali, Abdelhamid – Saharan Conflict: Towards Territorial Autonomy as a Right to Democratic Self-Determination. London: Stacey International, 2008.
- Elias, Robert & Jennifer Turpin, eds. – Rethinking peace
- Firebrace, James and Jeremy Harding – Exiles of the Desert
- Furley, Oliver, ed. – Conflict in Africa
- Gallagher, Charles F. – Morocco and Its Neighbours, Part I
- German Yearbook of International Law, Vol. 19
- Gretton, John – Western Sahara: The Fight for Self-Determination
- Hacene-Djaballah, Belkacem – Conflict in Western Sahara
- Haireche, Abdel-Kader – Conflict, conflict management and cooperation in North Africa
- Harding, Jeremy – The Fate of Africa: Trial by Fire
- Harkavy, Robert E. & Stephanie Newman, eds. – Lessons of Recent Wars in the Third World, Vol. 1
- Harrell-Bond, Barbara – The Struggle for the Western Sahara Part I
- Harrell-Bond, Barbara – The Struggle for the Western Sahara Part II
- Harrell-Bond, Barbara – The Struggle for the Western Sahara Part III
- Hodges, Tony – Historical dictionary of Western Sahara
- Hodges, Tony – The Western Saharans
- Hodges, Tony – Western Sahara: The Roots of a Desert War
- Houser, George M. – No One Can Stop the Rain
- Human Rights Watch/Middle East – Keeping It Secret
- Jensen, Erik – Western Sahara: Lines in the Sand. Boulder: Lynne Rienner Publishers, 2005.
- Kamil, Leo – Fueling the Fire
- Keegan, John & Andrew Wheatcroft – Zones of conflict
- Lawless, Richard & Laila Manahan, eds. – War and refugees
- Layachi, Azzedino – Images of foreign policy
- Layachi, Azzedino – The United States and North Africa
- Legum, Colin, ed. – Africa Contemporary Record: Survey and Documents, Vol. I
- Legum, Colin, ed. – Africa Contemporary Record: Survey and Documents, Vol. II
- Legum, Colin, ed. – Africa Contemporary Record: Survey and Documents, Vol. III
- Legum, Colin, ed. – Africa Contemporary Record: Survey and Documents, Vol. IV
- Legum, Colin, ed. – Africa Contemporary Record: Survey and Documents, Vol. V
- Legum, Colin, ed. – Africa Contemporary Record: Survey and Documents, Vol. VI
- Legum, Colin, ed. – Africa Contemporary Record: Survey and Documents, Vol. VII
- Legum, Colin, ed. – Africa Contemporary Record: Survey and Documents, Vol. VIII
- Legum, Colin, ed. – Africa Contemporary Record: Survey and Documents, Vol. IX
- Legum, Colin, ed. – Africa Contemporary Record: Survey and Documents, Vol. X
- Legum, Colin, ed. – Africa Contemporary Record: Survey and Documents, Vol. XI
- Legum, Colin, ed. – Africa Contemporary Record: Survey and Documents, Vol. XII
- Legum, Colin, ed. – Africa Contemporary Record: Survey and Documents, Vol. XIII
- Legum, Colin, ed. – Africa Contemporary Record: Survey and Documents, Vol. XIV
- Legum, Colin, ed. – Africa Contemporary Record: Survey and Documents, Vol. XV
- Legum, Colin, ed. – Africa Contemporary Record: Survey and Documents, Vol. XVI
- Legum, Colin, ed. – Africa Contemporary Record: Survey and Documents, Vol. XVII
- Legum, Colin, ed. – Africa Contemporary Record: Survey and Documents, Vol. XVIII
- Legum, Colin, ed. – Africa Contemporary Record: Survey and Documents, Vol. XIX
- Legum, Colin, ed. – Africa Contemporary Record: Survey and Documents, Vol. XX
- Legum, Colin, ed. – Africa Contemporary Record: Survey and Documents, Vol. XXI
- Lippert, Anne – The Saharawi Refugees
- Lodwick, John – The Forbidden Coast
- Markovitz, Irving Leonard, ed. – Studies of power and class in Africa
- Mercker, John – The Sahrawis of Western Sahara
- Mercker, John – Spanish Sahara
- Nelson, Harold D. – Morocco: A Country Study
- Neuberger, Benyamin – National self-determination in post-colonial Africa
- Norris, H. T. – The Arab Conquest of the Western Sahara
- Olsson, Claes, ed. – The Western Sarhara Conflict: The Role of Natural Resources in Decolonization. Uppsala, Sweden: Nordiska Afrikainstitutet, 2006.
- Palin, Michael with Basil Pao – Sahara. Thomas Dunne Bks: St. Martin's, 2003. ISBN 0-312-30541-9.
- Parker, Richard B. – North Africa: regional tensions and strategic concerns
- Partingdon, David H., ed. – The Middle East Annual: Issues and Events, Vol. 2, 1982
- Pazzanita, Anthony G. & Tony Hodges – A historical dictionary of Western Sahara
- Pazzanita, Anthony G. – Western Sahara. Oxford: ABC-Clio Press, 2005, ISBN 1-85109-256-0.
- Pazzanita, Anthony G. and Tony Hodges – Historical dictionary of Western Sahara, 2nd ed.
- Pickart, George A. – The Western Sahara
- Price, David Lynn – Conflict in the Maghreb: the Western Sahara
- Price, David Lynn – Morocco and the Sahara
- Price, David Lynn – The Western Sahara
- Rezette, Robert – The Western Sahara and the Frontiers of Morocco
- Rivkin, Benjamin – The Western Sahara: towards a referendum
- Rothschild, David & Naomi Chazan, eds. – The Precarious Balance
- Rubinstein, Alvin Z. – Moscow's third world strategy
- Saxena, Suresh Chandra – The Liberation War in Western Sahara
- Saxena, Suresh Chandra – Self-determination in Western Sahara
- Saxena, Suresh Chandra – Western Sahara: No Alternative to Armed Struggle.
- Shelley, Toby – Endgame in the Western Sahara: What Future for Africa's Last Colony? London and New York: Zed Books, 2004.
- Sipe, Lynn F. – Western Sahara: a comprehensive bibliography
- Sixth Congress of the Polisario Front
- Somerville, Keith – Foreign military intervention in Africa
- Spenler, Chris – The Maghreb in the 1990s
- Strategic Survey, 1979, London: International Institute for Strategic Studies
- Strategic Survey, 1982–1983, London: International Institute for Strategic Studies
- Strategic Survey, 1983–1984, London: International Institute for Strategic Studies
- Strategic Survey, 1988–1989, London: International Institute for Strategic Studies
- Thompson, Virginia & Richard Adloff – The Western Saharans
- Trout, Frank E. – Morocco's Saharan Frontiers
- United Nations General Assembly Official Records – Report of the United Nations Visiting Mission to Spanish Sahara, 1975
- United Nations Yearbook, 1975
- United Nations Yearbook, 1976
- United Nations Yearbook, 1977
- United Nations Yearbook, 1978
- United Nations Yearbook, 1979
- United Nations Yearbook, 1980
- United Nations Yearbook, 1981
- United Nations Yearbook, 1982
- United Nations Yearbook, 1983
- United Nations Yearbook, 1984
- United Nations Yearbook, 1985
- United Nations Yearbook, 1986
- United Nations Yearbook, 1987
- United Nations Yearbook, 1988
- United Nations Yearbook, 1991
- United Nations Yearbook, 1992
- United Nations Yearbook, 1993
- United States State Department – Spanish Sahara: Background Notes
- Vieuchange, Michel; Vieuchange, Jean (editor). – Smara: The Forbidden City
- War and Peace. Marshall Cavendish Illustrated Encyclopedia of Postwar Conflict, vol. X
- Ware, Lewis B. – Decolonization and the Global Alliance in the Arab Maghrib
- Waring, Mowton L. – Spanish Sahara, focus of contention
- Weexsteen, Raoul, et al. – The Struggle for Sahara
- The World in Conflict 1990, London: Brassey's UK/Maxwell Pergamon
- Wright, Stephen & Janice N. Brownfoot, eds. – Africa in world politics
- Zartman, I. William – The political economy of Morocco
- Zartman, I. William – Ripe for resolution
- Zoubir, Yahia H. & Daniel Volman, eds. – International dimensions of the Western Sahara conflict
