= People's Liberation Army Museum =

Museum in Algeria

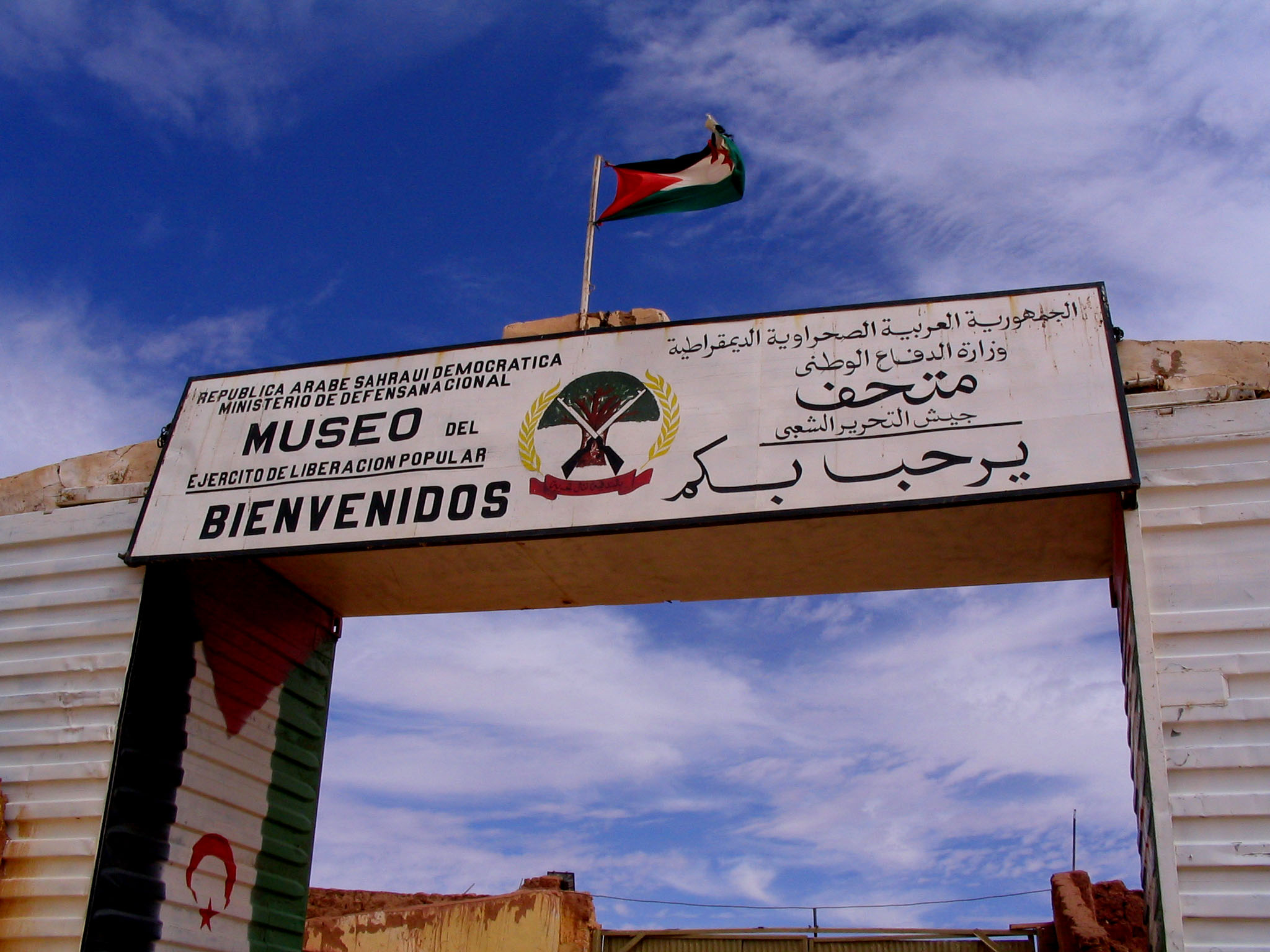
Museum of the Popular Army of Liberation (PAL)

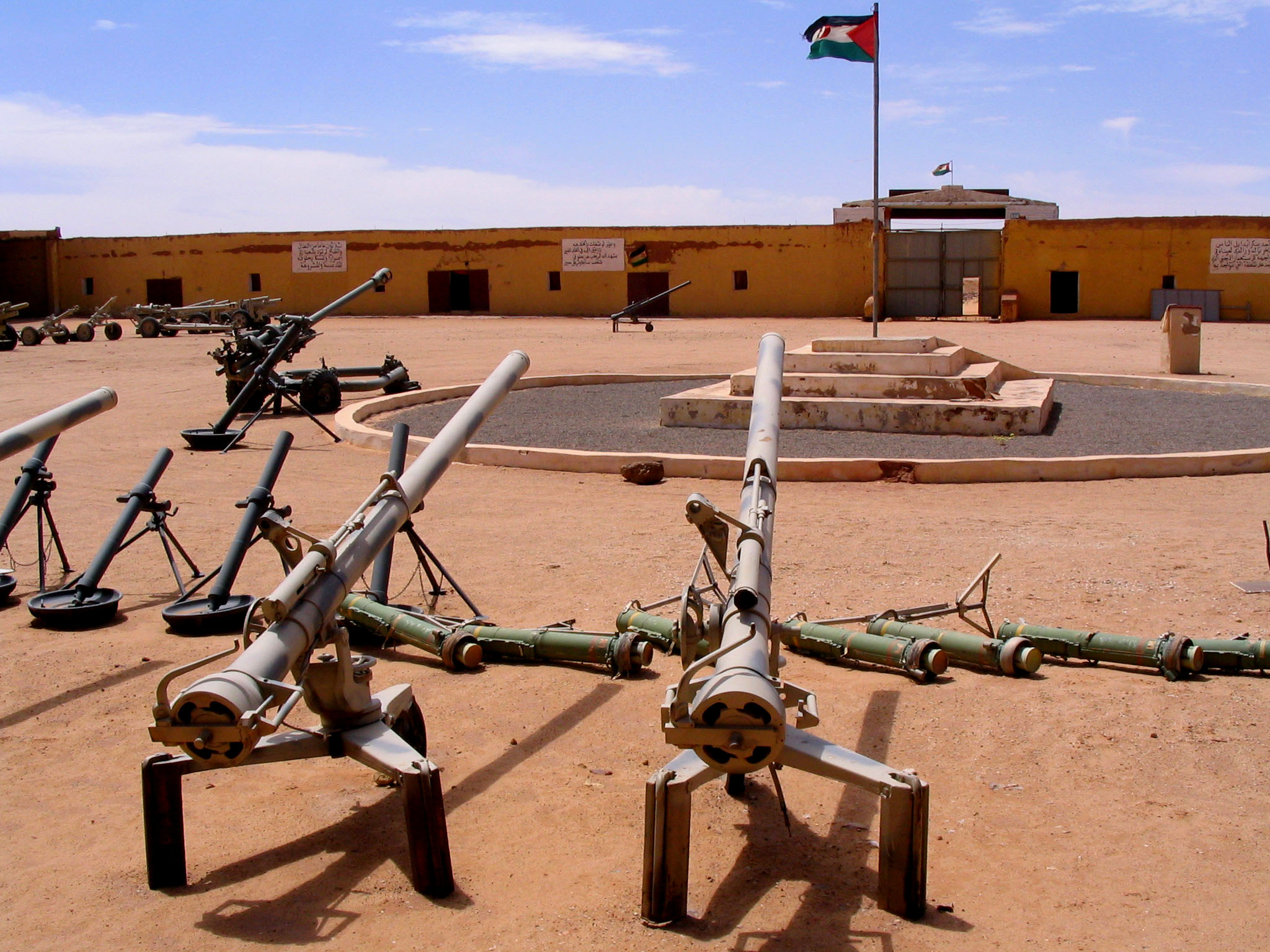
Central part of the museum

The Museum of the Sahrawi people's Liberation Army (Arabic: متحف جیش التحریر الشعبي; Spanish: Museo del Ejército de Liberación Popular) is located in the Rabouni refugee camp, which is one of the Sahrawi refugee camps, in the southwest of Algeria. This museum is dedicated to the struggle for the independence of the Sahrawi people. It presents weapons, vehicles and uniforms used as well as abundant documentation history.

Currently it is also the seat of the government of the Sahrawi Arab Democratic Republic.

== List of exhibits ==
=== Vehicles ===
- AMX-13 F3
- Eland-20
- Eland-90
- AML-90
- Panhard M3
- SK-105 Kürassier
- Unimog
- VAB

=== Towed artillery ===
- M101 howitzer
- B-11 recoilless rifle
- M40 recoilless rifle
- L118 light gun

=== Small arms and explosives ===
- AK-47
- FN FAL
- Heckler & Koch G3
- Heckler & Koch MP5
- M72 LAW
- Browning M1919
- TS-50 mine
- VS-50 mine

== See also ==
- Polisario
