= Human rights in Western Sahara =

The Government of Morocco sees Western Sahara as its Southern Provinces. The Moroccan government considers the Polisario Front as a separatist movement given the alleged Moroccan origins of some of its leaders.

The Polisario Front argues that according to international organizations, like the United Nations or the African Union, the territory of Western Sahara has the right of self-determination, and that according to those organizations Morocco illegally occupies the parts of Western Sahara under its control. Polisario regards this as a consequence of the vision of a Great Morocco, fuelled in the past by the Istiqlal and Hassan II, and considers itself a national liberation movement aiming at leading the disputed territory to independence under the Sahrawi Arab Democratic Republic.

The European Union, the African Union and the United Nations do not recognize the sovereignty of Morocco over Western Sahara.

== Human rights ==
The Western Sahara conflict has resulted in severe human rights abuses, most notably the aerial bombardments with Napalm and White phosphorus of the Sahrawi refugee camps, the consequent exodus of tens of thousands of Sahrawi civilians from the country, and the forced expropriation and expulsion of tens of thousands of Moroccan civilians by the Algerian government from Algeria in reaction to the Green March as well as violations of human rights and serious breaches of the Geneva convention by the Polisario Front, the Moroccan government and the Algerian government.

Both Morocco and the Polisario accuse each other of violating the human rights of the populations under their control, in the Moroccan-occupied parts of Western Sahara and the Tindouf refugee camps in Algeria, respectively. Morocco and organisations such as France Libertés consider Algeria to be directly responsible for any crimes committed on its territory, and accuse the country of having been directly involved in such violations.

Morocco has been repeatedly condemned and criticized for its actions in Western Sahara by several international non-governmental organizations (NGOs) such as:

- Amnesty International
- Human Rights Watch
- World Organization Against Torture
- Freedom House
- Reporters Without Borders
- International Committee of the Red Cross
- UN High Commissioner for Human Rights
- Derechos Human Rights
- Defend International
- Front Line Defenders
- International Federation of Human Rights
- Society for Threatened Peoples
- Norwegian Refugee Council
- Robert F. Kennedy Center for Justice and Human Rights
- Cairo Institute for Human Rights Studies
- Arabic Network for Human Rights Information
- Euro-Mediterranean Human Rights Network

Polisario has received criticism from the French organization France Libertes on its treatment of Moroccan prisoners-of-war, and on its general behaviour in the Tindouf refugee camps in reports by the European Strategic Intelligence and Security Center. A number of former members of Polisario who have joined Morocco accuse the organisation of abuse of human rights and sequestration of the population in Tindouf.

During the war (1975–91), both sides accused each other of targeting civilians. Neither claim has met with support abroad. The USA, EU, AU and UN refused to include the Polisario Front on their lists of terrorist organizations. Polisario Front leaders maintain that they are ideologically opposed to terrorism, as they had condemned terrorist attacks and signed the "Convention on the Prevention and Combating of Terrorism", in the framework of the African Union.

Human rights are repressed in the Moroccan-occupied territories of Western Sahara, according to Amnesty International in 2003 and Human Rights Watch in 2004. While the situation has improved since the early 1990s, the political liberalization in Morocco has not had the same effect on Western Sahara according to Amnesty International in 2004, when it comes to having a pro-independence position. There are allegations of police abuse and torture by Polisario-organisations, and suspected dissidents are harassed. The United States State Department reported in 2000 that there were arbitrary arrests of Sahrawis and no organized labor. Prisoners of conscience were kept in squalid conditions according to Polisario-groups. Some Sahrawis also complain of systematic discrimination in favor of Moroccan settlers.

The Moroccan response to the demonstrations of 2005 was aggressive, and provoked international reactions. In a criticised mass trial in December 2005, 14 leading Sahrawi activists were sentenced to prison sentences; many more had previously been detained. Most of these prisoners were later released by royal decree in the spring of 2006, but some have since again been rearrested.

According to the US State Department's 2006 report on Morocco "The law generally provides for freedom of speech and of the press. The government generally respected these rights in practice, as long as Islam, the monarchy, and territorial integrity (the inclusion of the Western Sahara) were not criticized. Throughout the year several publications tested the boundaries of press freedom."

The US State Department's 2005 report on Morocco's attitude towards human rights noted that "[i]n 2004 various international human rights groups estimated that 700 persons were imprisoned for advocating Western Saharan independence." Foreign journalists and visiting missions have been prevented from visiting the territory and in some instances deported from it. In 2004, Moroccan newsman Ali Lmrabet was sentenced to heavy fines and ten-year ban on practicing journalism, for referring in an article to the Sahrawis in Tindouf, Algeria, as being "refugees" rather than "sequestered" or "kidnapped", as is the official Moroccan position. Sahrawi human rights organizations have been refused permission to operate in Morocco: the Sahrawi branch of the Moroccan Forum for Truth and Justice (FVJ) was dissolved in 2003, and its members arrested. They were later released in the royal amnesties of 2006, or before that, even if some have since been rearrested again. Presently, several organisations, such as the ASVDH, operate illegally, with activists occasionally subject to arrests and harassment, whereas others, such as the Polisario close AFAPREDESA, are mainly active in exile.

Sahrawi activists have tried to compensate for this through extensive use of the Internet, reporting from illegal demonstrations, and documenting police abuse and torture through online pictures and video. Morocco has responded by blockading Internet access to these sites in Morocco and in Western Sahara, prompting accusations of Internet censorship. On 20 December 2005 Reporters Without Borders reported that Morocco has added Anonymizer to its Internet blacklist, days after the association recommended the service to Moroccans and Sahrawis wishing to access the banned Sahrawi sites. "These websites, promoting independence for Western Sahara, have been censored since the beginning of December" it reports.

== Human rights in Morocco-occupied Western Sahara ==
The most severe accusations of human rights abuses by the Kingdom of Morocco are the bombings with napalm and White phosphorus of the improvised refugee camps in Western Sahara in early 1976, killing hundreds of civilians, as well as the fate of hundreds of "disappeared" Sahrawi civilians sequestered by Moroccan military or police forces, most of them during the Western Sahara War. Other accusations are the torture, repression and imprisonment of Sahrawis who oppose peacefully the Moroccan occupation, the expulsion from the territory of foreign journalist, teachers and NGO members, the discrimination of the Sahrawis on the labor and the spoliation of the natural resources of the territory.

On the 15th Session of the United Nations Human Rights Council, former prisoner, human rights defender and second vice-president of CODESA (Collective of Sahrawi Human Rights Defenders) El Mami Amar Salem denounced that more than 30,000 Sahrawi citizens had been tortured by Moroccan forces since 1975.

=== The "disappeared" ===
In 2010 around 520 Sahrawi civilians remained "disappeared" by Moroccan forces, according to human rights groups; some estimate that the total number of "disappeared" could be as high as 1,500. In the past, Morocco denied that any such political prisoners existed, but in 1991 released nearly 200 "disappeared" prisoners, many of whom had been held in secret detention centers since the mid-1970s. Since then, there have been no further releases of "disappeared" prisoners. Amnesty International stated in a 1999 report that:

"The men, women and even children who "disappeared" in Western Sahara came from all walks of life. Many were detained because of their alleged pro-independence activities, support for the Polisario Front, and opposition to Morocco's control of the Western Sahara. Others, including elderly people and children, "disappeared" because of their family links with known or suspected opponents to Moroccan government policy in Western Sahara."

— Amnesty International report 1999

In May 2005, the remains of 43 Sahrawi "disappeared" were exhumed from secret prisons on the south of Morocco (Kalaat Maguna, Tagunit). They were detained in Western Sahara (Laayoune, Smara) & southern Morocco (Tan-Tan, Assa) in the 1970s and 1980s.

In 2008, the head of CORCAS and former leader of the Sahrawi National Union Party, Khelli Henna Ould Rachid, declared:

"Some Moroccan army officers have made what might be called war crimes against prisoners outside the scope of the war ... Many civilians were launched into space from helicopters or buried alive simply for being Sahrawis".

The same year (4 January) construction workers uncovered a mass grave with approximately 15 skeletons in Smara, in former military barracks built during the 1970s, the period during which multiple Sahrawis disappeared or were murdered by Moroccan authorities.

Resulting from the "Reconciliation tribunals" in Morocco in 2005, some graves of political dissidents of Hassan II regime (Sahrawis & Moroccans) were uncovered, although the responsible persons of those crimes have never been judged or their identities revealed. Also, the testimonies of witnesses have not been published yet.

In March 2010, a new grave was found by Bou Craa workers on a phosphate mine with 7 corpses, supposedly Sahrawi nomads killed by Moroccan forces during the mid-1970s.

=== Freedom House ===
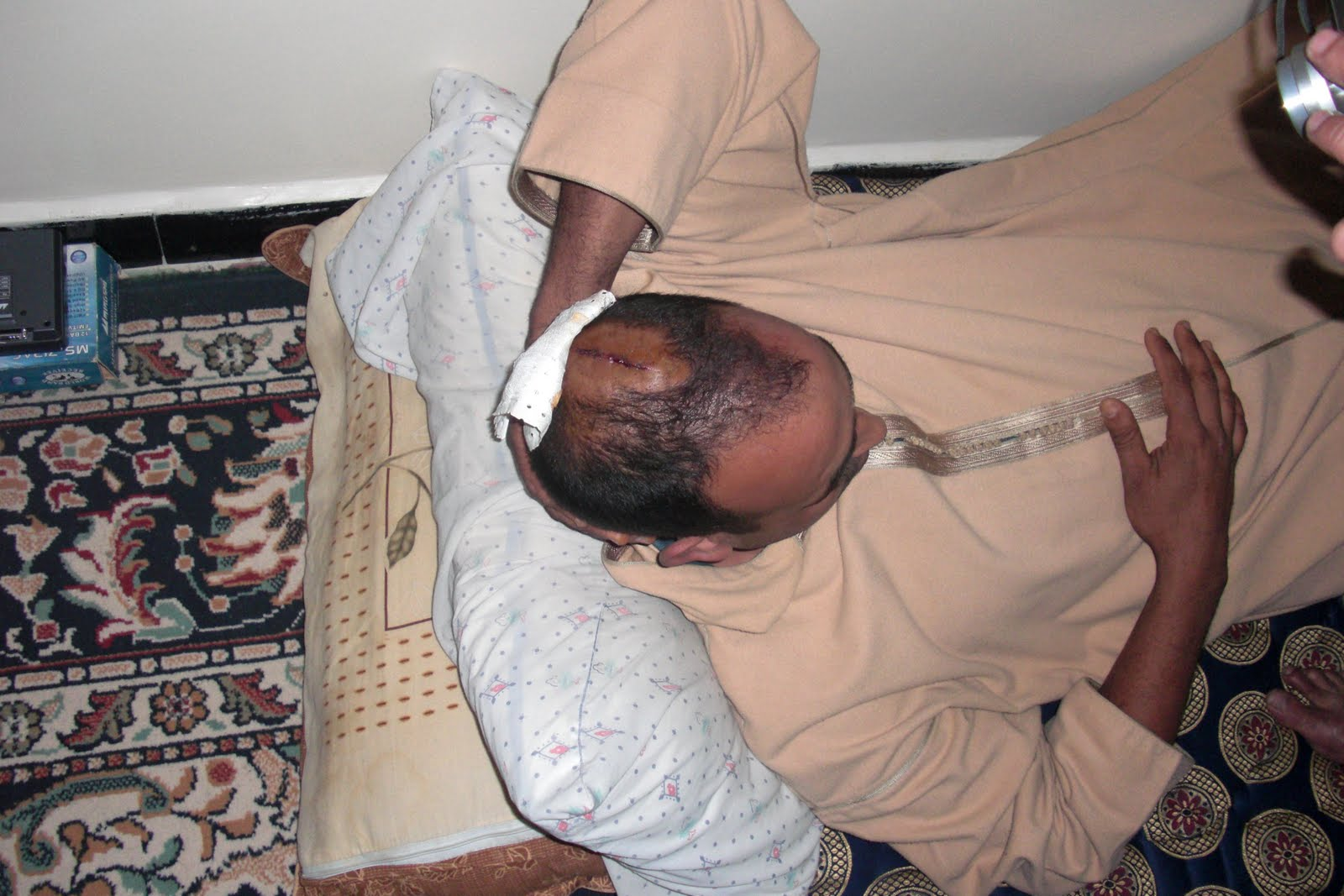
Sahrawi civilian showing his head wounds caused by Moroccan police during a demonstration in Dakhla, 2 March 2011

In late 2005, the international democracy watchdog Freedom House listed the abuses of human rights by Morocco. Those relating to political processes were: controlling elections and not allowing Sahrawis to form political associations (such as labor organizations) or non-governmental organizations. The paper included reports of repressive measures against demonstrators.

=== Amnesty International ===
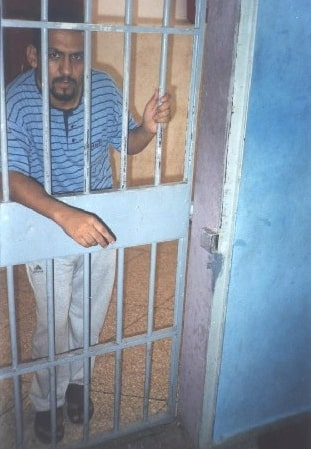
Sahrawi human rights defender Ali Salem Tamek during his imprisonment in Ait Melloul prison, near Agadir, Morocco. 29 August 2005

After repeatedly calling attention to alleged human rights violations in Moroccan-occupied Western Sahara, Amnesty International (AI) received, in April 2006, two detailed responses from the Moroccan Ministry of Justice. The Ministry declared that human rights defenders were not stopped and were not taken into custody because of their opinions, but because of their implication in acts liable to infractions of the law. It stressed that they were guaranteed their full civil liberties and gave precise details concerning the investigations in progress into the allegations of torture relating to Houssein Lidri and Brahim Noumria. In addition, the letter refuted the specific allegations of harassing and intimidation with regard to other demonstrators in the Sahara.

Amnesty International responded by claiming that the authorities have not answered the principal concern of the organization regarding the equity of the lawsuits of Sahrawi protestors. For instance, no mention was made in connection with the allegations of torture and ill-treatment of detainees, and allegations that defendants were not authorized to quote witnesses for the defence.

In June 2006, Amnesty International released its 2005 report on Morocco and Western Sahara, again citing excessive police force, leading to the death of two demonstrators. In the section: "Protests in Western Sahara" Amnesty reports: "Dozens of people were charged with inciting or participating in violence in the demonstrations. Over 20 were later convicted and some were sentenced to several years in prison. Among those sentenced were seven long-standing human rights defenders who were monitoring and disseminating information on the crackdown by the security forces. Two alleged that they had been tortured during questioning. An eighth human rights defender was detained awaiting trial at the end of the year. All eight were possible prisoners of conscience."

=== Child recruitment ===
War Resisters' International stated in 1998 that Morocco conscripts citizens, including Sahrawis in the Moroccan-occupied parts of Western Sahara, into the army; it was a punishable offence to resist. The WRI also cited sources from 1993 saying that "[r]eports indicate that Moroccan authorities in the south have strongly urged under-eighteens to enlist in the armed forces. Fourteen and fifteen-year-old boys in southern Morocco and in the occupied territory of Western Sahara have been allowed to enlist", further citing a source from 1994 that "there are many human rights abuses against the Sahrawi population. So far there has been no investigation of the conduct of the Moroccan army in this conflict." Conscription for the Moroccan army was abolished in 2006.

=== Polisario Prisoners of War ===
In addition to the civilian "disappeared", the Polisario Front accuses the Moroccan government of refusing to provide information on the Sahrawi prisoners of war, who were captured on the battlefield during the war years (1975–91). Morocco long denied holding any war prisoners, but in 1996 released 66 Polisario Front POWs, who were then evacuated to the refugee camps in Tindouf, Algeria under international supervision. Polisario maintains that 151 POWs are still missing after being captured by the Moroccan Army, and requests that the Moroccan government shall release them or clarify their fate. Morocco claims it no longer holds any prisoners of war.

=== Expulsion of Christian foreign workers ===
Morocco has occasionally expelled small numbers of missionary groups, some funded by U.S. evangelical Churches, in Morocco and in the Western Sahara parts that it occupies. But in March 2010, aid groups and Western countries diplomats denounced that only in that month 70 Christian foreign aid workers were expelled without any trial. Some of them were from USA, New Zealand, Netherlands and United Kingdom, causing the protest of some ambassadors. While the Moroccan government accused them of trying to convert children to Christianity, and of proselytism, the Christian groups claim that the government was trying to restrict their work at the "Village of Hope" children's home, for abandoned and orphaned children. Another case was the deportation from El Aaiun of the Spanish teacher Sara Domene. She had been working as a Spanish teacher since 2007. The Moroccan governor of the El Aaiun province sent an expulsion note to the Spanish embassy in Rabat, accusing her of "being a serious threat to the public order and her expulsion is imperative to safeguard public order", in other words, an accusation of proselytism. Sara stated that despite being Evangelic, she is a philologist, and that she exclusively taught Spanish language classes, using the money she earned for a centre for handicapped persons. Sara was expelled 48 hours after she was given notice.

=== Status at 2010 ===
In October 2006, a secret report by the United Nations High Commission for Refugees leaked to the media by the Norwegian Support Committee for Western Sahara detailing the deteriorating condition of human rights in the occupied territory of Western Sahara. The report details several eyewitness testimonies regarding violence associated with the Independence Intifada, particularly of the Moroccan police against peaceful demonstrators.

In March 2010, the Sahrawi human rights activist Rachid Sghir was beaten by Moroccan policemen after an interview with the BBC.

On 28 August, Moroccan police arrested 11 Spanish activists, who were demonstrating for independence for the disputed territory in El Aaiun. They claimed that the police had beat them, releasing a photo of one of the wounded.

In September 2010, a delegation comprising 70 Sahrawis from the Moroccan-occupied part of Western Sahara participate in the International Symposium "The right of peoples to resist: the case of Sahrawi people" in Algiers. On their return to El Aaiun airport, the group decided flying in three different groups, accompanied with international observers and journalists. The first group entered without difficulties, but some individuals of the second group were beaten by the police. The third group joined the rest in a house in El Aaiun, surrounded by the police, and finally held a sit in protest in the street, with their mouths taped-up.

In October, thousands of Sahrawis fled from El Aaiun and other towns to the outskirts of Lemseid oasis (Gdeim Izik), raising up a campament of thousands of "jaimas" (Sahrawi tents) called the "Dignity camp", in the biggest Sahrawi mobilization since the Spanish retreat. They protest for the discrimination of Sahrawis in labor and for the exploitation of the natural resources of Western Sahara by Morocco. The protest, that started with a few jaimas on 9 October, grew up to more than 10,000 persons on 21 October. Other campaments were erected in the outskirts of Bojador, Smara and El Aaiun, but were disbanded by Moroccan police. The "Gdeim Izik" campament was surrounded by troops of the Moroccan Army and policemen, who made a blockage of water, food and medicines to the camp. On 24 October, a SUV that was trying to enter the camp was machine-gunned by Moroccan soldiers, killing Elgarhi Nayem, a 14-year-old Sahrawi boy, and wounding the other five passengers. The Moroccan Interior ministry claimed that the SUV was gunned after shots rang out of the vehicle, which was denied by their families. According to Sahrawi sources, Elgarhi was buried in secret by the Moroccan authorities, without autopsy or the consent of his family. By that days, the camp had grow to more than 20,000 inhabitants. The Moroccan Army had encircled the camp with a wall of sand and stones, controlling the only access to the camp. On 31 October, Tiago Viera (president of the World Federation of Democratic Youth) was expelled from El Aaiun airport, first to Casablanca and then returned to Lisbon, for alleged "irregularities" when he was trying to visit the camp. Also that day, eight Spanish activists that also tried to reach Gdeim Izik were retained by Moroccan police on a boat in the port of El Aaiun, when they were confronted by a crowd of Moroccans who make death-threats on them. Police stated that they cannot guarantee their safety, and denied them entering the territory, so they had to return to Las Palmas. On 6 November, three Spanish regional MP's that tried to visit the "Dignity camp" were retained in Casablanca and expelled to Spain the next day without any explanation.

== Human rights in Polisario-controlled refugee camps ==
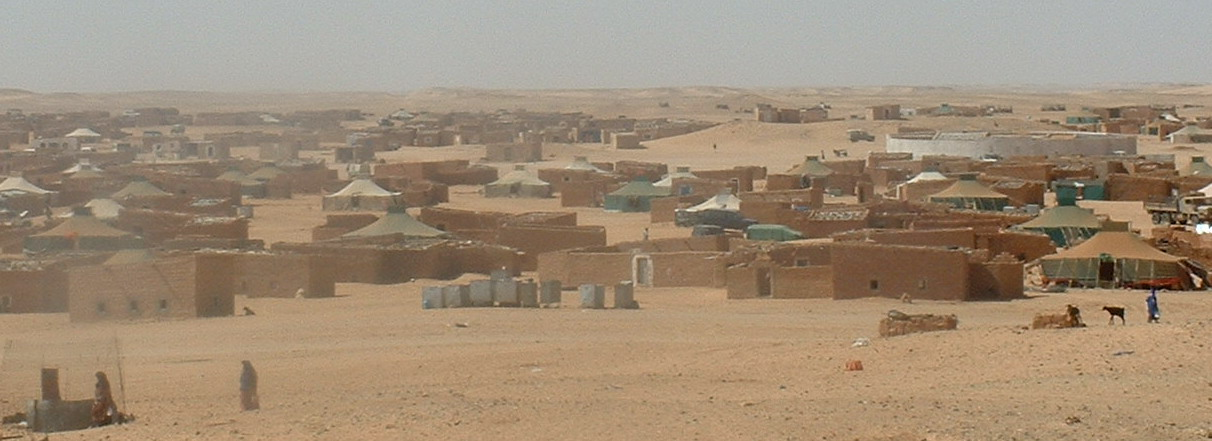
The Sahrawi refugee camp of Awserd, in Tindouf Province, Algeria

The most severe accusations of human rights abuses by the Polisario Front have been about the detention, killing and the abusive treatment of Moroccan prisoners of war from the late 70s to 2006. Other accusations were that some of the population are kept in the Tindouf refugee camps against their will and did not enjoy freedom of expression. Moroccan newspapers have aired reports of demonstrations being suppressed violently by Polisario forces in the Tindouf camps, but these reports have not been confirmed by international media or human rights organizations.

Several international and Spanish human rights and aid organizations are active in the camps on a permanent basis, and contest the Moroccan allegations; there are several people and organizations that claim the Tindouf camps are a model for running refugee camps democratically. In November 2012, the Representative of the High Commissioner for Refugees in Algeria, Mr. Ralf Gruenert stated: "We have not seen cases of torture in the Saharawi refugee camps".

In April 2010, the Sahrawi government called on the UN to supervise Human rights in the liberated territories (Free Zone) and refugee camps, hoping that Morocco would do the same.

=== Moroccan Prisoners of War ===
Until 1997, Morocco refused to recognize the soldiers captured by the Polisario as POWs, even rejecting their repatriation to their homeland, as it happened with the first groups, liberated unilaterally and unconditionally by the Polisario Front in 1984 and 1989 (by demand of the Italian government of Ciriaco De Mita). On 19 November 1995, the first group of Moroccan soldiers were repatriated to Morocco by mediation of the ICRC, Argentina and the United States. In April 1997, another group of 84 prisoners were released, followed by around 191 more released for the Ramadan festivities on 23 November 1999. Again, Morocco refused to repatriate the soldiers, allegedly because that would mean recognizing that Morocco was at war against the Polisario. Finally on 26 February 2000, a groups of 186 prisoners were repatriated to the Inezgane military base, in Agadir, and another 201 were released and repatriated on 13 December 2000.

On 17 January 2002, another 115 POWs were released and repatriated, by request of the Spanish government of Jose Maria Aznar. 100 POW's were released on 17 June 2002, by request of the German government of Gerhard Schröder, and were repatriated to Agadir on 7 July 2002. On 10 February 2003, the Polisario released 100 POW's on request from the Spanish government.

In April 2003, the France Libertés foundation led an international mission of inquiry on the conditions of detention of Moroccan prisoners of war long held by the Polisario Front in the Sahrawi refugee camps of Algeria and in the Liberated Territories of Western Sahara. The prisoners (under Red Cross supervision since the 1980s) had been held since the end of hostilities, awaiting the conclusion of a formal peace treaty, but as the cease-fire dragged on over a decade, a number of prisoners had at this time been held between 15 and 20 years, making them the longest-serving POWs in the world. Polisario had begun releasing a few hundred prisoners at 1984, and continued with that liberations during the 1990s and 2000s, in what were referred by countries like USA, Italy, Ireland, Libya, Qatar or Spain as "humanitarian gestures", but its refusal to release the last prisoners remained under criticism from the United Nations.

In its report, the French foundation produced detailed accusations of torture, forced labour, arbitrary detentions and summary executions of captured soldiers, and claimed that these and other systematic abuses had evaded the Red Cross. Most of the crimes had allegedly been committed in the 1980s, but some were of a later date. The foundation, which supports Sahrawi self-determination and had worked in the camps before, decided to suspend "its interventions in the Saharawi refugee camps of Tindouf where the forced labour of the POWs has been going on for the past 28 years". The report also accused Algeria of direct involvement in crimes against the POWs, and overall responsibility for their situation. On 14 August 2003, 243 Moroccan POW's were released and repatriated, and another 300 POW's were released on 7 November 2003, by the mediation of Saif al-Islam Gaddafi, through the GIFCA. On 21 June 2004, another group of 100 prisoners of war were released, by a previous request from the Irish government of Bertie Ahern. They were repatriated by the ICRC on 23 June.

The Polisario Front finally released the last 404 POWs on 18 August 2005.

=== Freedom of movement ===
In a report published in 2003 Amnesty International concluded that "Freedom of expression, association and movement continued to be restricted in the camps controlled by the Polisario Front, near Tindouf in southwestern Algeria. Those responsible for human rights abuses in the camps in previous years continued to enjoy impunity.". However, in its 2006 update of the annual report, the references to a lack of basic freedoms had been removed (though not the references to human rights abusers).

In 2005 the US Committee for Refugees and Immigrants stated: "The Algerian Government allowed the rebel group, Polisario, to confine nearly a hundred thousand refugees from the disputed Western Sahara to four camps in desolate areas outside Tindouf military zone near the Moroccan border 'for political and military, rather than humanitarian, reasons,' according to one observer. According to Amnesty International, "This group of refugees does not enjoy the right to freedom of movement in Algeria. [...] Those refugees who manage to leave the refugee camps without being authorized to do so are often arrested by the Algerian military and returned to the Polisario authorities, with whom they cooperate closely on matters of security.' Polisario checkpoints surrounded the camps, the Algerian military guarded entry into Tindouf, and police operated checkpoints throughout the country."

The main concern of most human rights organizations seems to be the refugees' problems of basic subsistence, living on a meager diet of foreign aid. Human Rights Watch carried out an extensive research mission in the region in 1995, visiting Morocco, Western Sahara and the Tindouf refugees. Its conclusion on the human rights situation for the Sahrawis in Tindouf was that "we found conditions to be satisfactory, taking into account the difficulties posed by the climate and desolate location".

In 1997 and 1999 respectively, the Canadian Lawyers Association for International Human Rights performed two investigative missions to Western Sahara, the first focused on the Tindouf refugee camps, and the second on conditions in Moroccan-occupied Western Sahara. The conclusion of the Tindouf mission states that "the refugee camps in Algeria are highly organized and provide more than just the most basic needs to their inhabitants" and that "It appears that a significant effort is being made to ensure that the population is well-educated and that they participate in the governance of the camps."

=== Cuba students programme ===
Polisario is regularly accused by Morocco of deporting Sahrawi children by groups of thousands to Cuba for Communist indoctrination, something which has been supported by alleged former Tindouf refugees now living in Morocco, and former Cuban government officials. This would be considered a case of forcible family separation. Morocco has also alleged that the Polisario exports Sahrawi minors to Cuba in order to force them into child prostitution and to train them as child soldiers. Polisario, which was founded on a left-wing ideology, responds that the children in Cuba, numbering tens or hundreds rather than thousands, are students at Cuban universities, and are there of their own free will under a UNHCR-sponsored student exchange program. It regards the Moroccan accusations as a smear campaign aimed at cutting off access to education for Sahrawi refugees.

While there exists primary education, there are no universities in the refugee camps, and so Sahrawis have to go abroad to study. Similar programmes exist for Sahrawi students in cooperation with universities in Algeria, Spain and Italy, and the Sahrawi Arab Democratic Republic has repeatedly pleaded for more countries to accommodate Sahrawi students. The UNHCR, which oversees the program, has twice investigated the Moroccan claims. In its 2003 report, after having interviewed all 252 Sahrawi students in Cuba, it states that it was the children's own personal will to continue taking advantage of the opportunity to study in Cuba.

In 2005, the UNHCR again examined the issue, after continued Moroccan allegations. The number of students was now down to 143, and the UNHCR program was not expected to be renewed after the graduation of those students. The report states that a number of the Saharan refugee children have availed themselves of scholarships offered within the framework of bilateral relations between the refugee leadership and various countries. The report suggests that this scholarship programme meets the standards of treatment and care required by the 1989 Convention on the Rights of the Child, especially in:

- Protection of the minors from all forms of discrimination while in Cuba, they enjoy equal educational opportunities as well as slightly more advantageous treatment in terms of material and health support provided in Cuban schools.
- Fully respect and guaranty of the rights of the students, in regard to health, nutrition, culture, personal liberty and security.
- Children are not subjected to any form of abuse or exploitation of any type whatsoever. This also covers military recruitment and training and child labour activities that would qualify as exploitative as defined by the CRC.
- All information gathered during the mission affirms the voluntary nature of participation in the programme of the children, the direct role of the parents in determining whether their child would participate, and the opportunity for the children who do not wish to continue the programme, to abandon it and return home.

=== Child recruitment ===
According to a 1998 report by War Resisters' International, "during the guerrilla war" – i.e. between 1975 and 1991 – "Polisario recruitment formed an integral part of the education programme. At the age of 12, children were either integrated into the "National School of 12 October" which prepares the political and military cadres, or they have been sent abroad to Algeria, Cuba and Libya to receive military training as well as regular schooling. At conscription age (17) they returned from abroad to be incorporated into Polisario's armed forces. They received more specialised training in engineering, radio, artillery, mechanics and desert warfare. At nineteen they became combatants."

== See also ==
- AFAPREDESA
- Ali Salem Tamek
- Aminatou Haidar
- ASVDH
- BIRDHSO
- Brahim Dahane
- History of Western Sahara
- Human rights in Morocco
- Internet censorship and surveillance in Western Sahara
- LGBT rights in the Sahrawi Arab Democratic Republic
- Mohamed Daddach
- Mohamed Elmoutaoikil
- Tazmamart
