= Norwegian Support Committee for Western Sahara =

The Norwegian Support Committee for Western Sahara (Norwegian: Støttekomiteen for Vest-Sahara, SKVS) is a Norwegian advocacy group.

It was established in 1993. It distributes information on the Moroccan occupation of Western Sahara, which it refers to as "Africa's last colony". The organization supports the Sahrawi Arab Democratic Republic, and thus pressures Morocco, directly as well as indirectly by opposing foreign investment in occupied Western Sahara, but has also pressured POLISARIO to release Moroccan prisoners-of-war.

According to the organization, they were the ones who nominated Sidi Mohammed Daddach for the Thorolf Rafto Memorial Prize in 2002, which he won.

The Norwegian Support Committee for Western Sahara is a member of the Norwegian Council for Africa.
