= Sahrawi Association of Victims of Grave Human Rights Violations Committed by the Moroccan State =

Organization

Sahrawi Association of Victims of Grave Violations of Human Rights Committed by the Moroccan State
- Founded: May 7, 2005
- Type: NGO
- Location: El Aaiun, Western Sahara
- Key people: Brahim Dahane (president); Elghalia Djimi (vice-president)
- Website: Official website in Arabic, English, Spanish and French

The Sahrawi Association of Victims of Grave Violations of Human Rights Committed by the Moroccan State (Spanish: Asociación Saharaui de Víctimas de Violaciones Graves de los Derechos Humanos Cometidas por el Estado Marroquí; Arabic: جمعية الصحراوية لضحايا الانتهاكات الجسيمة لحقوق الإنسان المرتكبة من طرف الدولة المغربية; French: Association Sahraouie des Victimes des Violations Graves des Droits Humains Commises par l’Etat Marocain), or ASVDH, is a Sahrawi human rights organization in the Moroccan-occupied areas of Western Sahara (considered the Southern Provinces by Morocco).

== Objectives ==
Objectives of the ASVDH are:

- To respect and defend human rights
- To uncover the truth about grave human-rights violations
- To find unaccounted victims of forced disappearance in Morocco
- To return to their families the remains of Sahrawis who died in secret Moroccan prisons
- To press for the release of Sahrawi political prisoners and the right to material and moral compensation and physical rehabilitation for victims and relatives in accordance with international human-rights law and international jurisprudence
- To end impunity and urge the prosecution of violations of crimes against humanity related to the Moroccan occupation in Western Sahara
- To protect the community against arbitrary arrest and detention, forced disappearance, torture, murder and other forms of degradation, and attacks on human dignity
- To establish a culture of peaceful respect for human rights in Western Sahara, based on the principles of international human-rights agreements

== History ==
ASVDH was founded in El Aaiun on May 7, 2005 by Sahrawi activists, including its president Brahim Dahane (a former prisoner of conscience). Although the association has complied with the Moroccan Law of Public Associations, it has been refused permission to operate by the Moroccan authorities and operates illegally with limited means. Its activities consist of researching and recording abuses by interviewing alleged victims of persecution and posting documentation (including photographs) of demonstrations, police interventions and torture on the Internet.

ASVDH has been outspoken in its defense of jailed Sahrawi human-rights and independence activists, such as Aminatou Haidar and Ali Salem Tamek. They were arrested during the Second Sahrawi Intifada, an activist term for May 2005 anti-occupation protests in El Aaiun.

As a result of this, the organization has been the subject of harassment and police action. President Brahim Dahane was detained on October 30, 2005, and charged with "belonging to an illegal organization" (ASVDH). The charge was condemned by Amnesty International and other international human-rights organizations, which campaigned for Dahane's release. As part of a general royal pardon, Dahane and other members of ASVDH were freed on April 22, 2006.

ASVDH applied for government recognition in 2006, and the following year a court ruled that the organization needed to be recognized by the government. It received government recognition in 2015, but Moroccan authorities continue to interfere with ASVDH's monitoring of human-rights abuses. The Moroccan government has called independence movements such as ASVDH a threat to regional security. The organization's work has been cited by Amnesty International, Human Rights Watch, the House Committee on Foreign Affairs and the Senate Committee on Foreign Relations.

== See also ==
- Association of the Families of Sahrawi Prisoners and Disappeared
- International Bureau for the Respect of Human Rights in Western Sahara
- History of Western Sahara
- Human rights in Western Sahara
