= Brahim Dahane =

Sahrawi human rights activist

- إبراهيم دحان
- Dahane at the annual pro-Sahrawi demonstration in Madrid, Spain (15 November 2008).
- Born: 1965 (age 60–61); El Aaiún, Spanish Sahara
- Known for: Human rights defender
- Awards: Per Anger Award (2009)

Brahim Dahane (Arabic: إبراهيم دحان, romanized: Ibrāhīm Daḥḥān; born 1965) is a Sahrawi human rights activist and president of the Sahrawi Association of Victims of Grave Human Rights Violations Committed by the Moroccan State.

== Biography ==
Born in 1965 in El Aaiun, in the part of Western Sahara controlled by Morocco, where he operated an Internet café which he had to close due to Moroccan government harassment.

=== 1987–1991 disappearance ===
At the age of 22, in 1987 he participated in the demonstrations to welcome the United Nations' MINURSO mission to El Aaiun. After the demonstrations, he was abducted by Moroccan security forces and held in secret detention centres for four years, when he was released along with approximately 300 other Sahrawi who had been subject to forced disappearance. According to Amnesty International,

He was arrested in 1987 and was held without charge or trial in secret detention centres until being released in 1991. The Moroccan authorities have never provided a formal reason for his arrest and "disappearance", but it is believed that he was targeted for peacefully demanding the right of the people of Western Sahara to self-determination.

— "Sahrawi human rights defenders under attack". Amnesty International USA. 29-08-2005.

In 1994, Dahane and three colleagues began to explore filing a case against Morocco for human rights violations. The committee for the Per Anger Prize described the event as "the first step towards organising and coordinating human rights activists in Western Sahara."

=== 2005–2006 detention ===
On 7 May 2005, he founded the ASVDH, and became its first president. After protesting police brutality during the anti-occupation protests that broke out in El Aaiun in May 2005, Dahane was detained on 30 October 2005 by Moroccan security personnel. For two days, he was questioned on his relations with international human rights associations and foreign diplomats. He was later charged with "belonging to an illegal organization", namely ASVDH. This was condemned by Amnesty International, and Human Rights Watch, both of which campaigned for Dahane's release. As part of a general royal pardon, Dahane and other members of ASVDH were set free on 22 April 2006.

=== 2009–11 imprisonment ===
On 8 October 2009, Dahane was arrested with other six Sahrawi human rights activists in the Casablanca Airport, when they returned from visiting family members in the Sahrawi refugee camps in Tindouf, Algeria. The Moroccan authorities accused them of "harming state security", and transferred the case to a military court. Agence Maghreb Arab Presse, Morocco's state-owned news agency, stated that the defendants "would have been in contact with parties hostile to Morocco, and perpetrate an attack against the best interests of the nation". The seven, widely known as the "Casablanca 7" were incarcerated in Salé. In March 2010, he and five of the other activists began a month-long hunger strike in protest of being imprisoned without trial, causing doctors to express concern for their safety.

The detention of the seven activists was protested by numerous human rights groups. The Robert F. Kennedy Center for Justice and Human Rights stated that it was monitoring the situation and urged the Moroccan government to "fulfill its obligations to respect for human rights under international law". Front Line Defenders began a letter-writing campaign for the activists to be released "immediately and unconditionally". Human Rights Watch stated, "In the past Morocco has unjustly imprisoned these and many other Sahrawis for their nonviolent political and human rights activism ... And after almost a year behind bars, the world is still waiting for evidence that would justify their detention this time around". Amnesty International lobbied for their release, describing the detention as "politically motivated" and naming them prisoners of conscience. The Olof Palme International Center also spoke out against the arrests and called on the Swedish government to condemn them as well.

By 2011, four of the seven were provisionally freed, but Dahane continued to be detained. Prosecutors accused him and the others of receiving money from Algeria "for unlawful purposes". The defendants responded that they had taken money only for travel expenses and had gone to Algeria "for humanitarian and purely human rights reasons." The trial was postponed several times, causing Dahane to ultimately be held for two and a half years without trial. Dahane and fellow detainees Ali Salem Tamek and Ahmed Nasiri were freed on 23 April 2011, just before they were set to begin another hunger strike to protest the conditions of their imprisonment.

== Per Anger Award ==
Brahim Dahane, won the Per Anger Award for human rights in 2009. He was nominated to the prize by the International Commission of Jurists. He was awarded "in recognition of having demonstrated unwavering personal courage, employed peaceful means and risked his life in the struggle for human rights during the conflict between Morocco and the POLISARIO over Western Sahara". The prize came with a cash award of 150,000 SEK (14,500 euro) and a silver sphere with the weight of a human heart. As he was imprisoned by the Moroccan regime, his sister Aicha Dahane had to travel to Sweden to accept the award on behalf of her brother.

== See also ==
- Ali Salem Tamek
- Aminatou Haidar
- Human rights in Western Sahara
- Mohamed Elmoutaoikil
- Mohammed Daddach
