= El Wali Amidane =

Sahrawi human rights activist (born 1986)

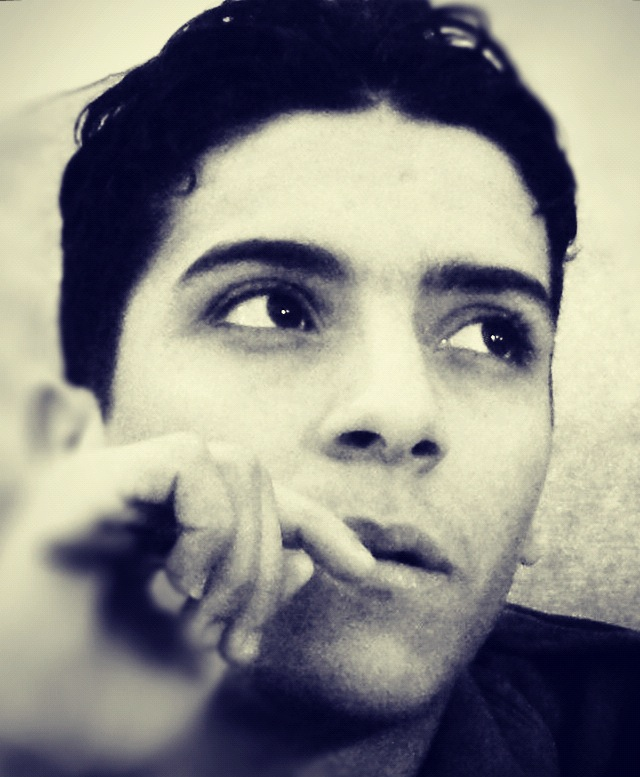
- Elwali while in prison
- Born: 26 October 1986 (age 40); El Aaiun, Western Sahara
- Citizenship: Moroccan
- Occupation: Human rights defender
- Years active: 2005–current
- Organization: Collective of Sahrawi Human Rights Defenders

El Wali Amidane (born 26 October 1986) is a Sahrawi human rights activist and an outspoken opponent of the Moroccan invasion of the territory of Western Sahara. He is known for his imprisonment and subsequent torture received in response to his activities on behalf of Saharawi human rights.

== Activist background ==
In May 2005, Amidane started his activities in the movement behind the Independence Intifada. For this, he was one of the first Saharawi human rights defenders to be arrested that year. He is member of the Saharawi organisation Collectif des Défenseurs Sahraouis des droits de l'homme (CODESA).

In 2006, few months after his release, Amidane's home was attacked by armed group of special forces of the Moroccan police. El Wali and his sister Elkouria Amidane were detained and tortured.

His sister was subsequently released, while El Wali Amidane was sentenced to five years imprisonment. Amidane undertook several hunger strikes while in jail. While in jail, his family's home in Western Sahara was stormed on numerous occasions, while his family was subjected to beatings.
