= Mohamed al-Bambary =

Sahrawi media activist (born 1969/1970)

- Born: 1969/70
- Occupation: Journalist
- Known for: Media activism

Mohamed al-Bambary (1969/70) is a Sahrawi media activist. He was arrested and charged with "belonging to a criminal gang, taking part in a murder, contributing to a public disturbance, battery resulting in death, vandalism of public property, and assaulting officials in the performance of their duties,”. Initially sentenced to twelve years imprisonment, his term was reduced to six years following a re-trial.

== Background ==
Mohamed al-Bambary is a media activist affiliated with Equipe Media, which is one of Western Sahara's foremost independent news sources. On September 26, 2011, the conclusion of a soccer game in Dakhla culminated in a large-scale brawl between two neighborhoods of the city. Al-Bambary captured videos of this violet riot, which lasted several days and resulted in the deaths of seven individuals, including two members of the police force.

== 2015 Arrest and Sentence ==
On August 27, 2015, al-Bambary was arrested when he went to the Dakhla police station with the intent to renew his identification card. The authorities charged him with "belonging to a criminal gang, taking part in a murder, contributing to a public disturbance, battery resulting in death, vandalism of public property, and assaulting officials in the performance of their duties,”. He was beaten and forced to sign a confession.

Three months after the arrest, al-Bambary was sentenced to twelve years of prison in a trial that was not accessible to the public. In a re-trial in January 2016, his term was reduced to six years. He is serving his sentence in Ait Meloul Prison outside of Agadir, Morocco in crowded conditions.

== International Response ==
In January 2016, Paloma López Bermejo, a member of the European Parliament from Spain, asked a question in parliament about “the arbitrary detention of the journalist and political prisoner Mohamed al-Bambary” to the Vice-president of the European Commission and High Representative of the Union for Foreign Affairs and Security Policy, Federica Mogherini.

In September 2016, human rights focused non-profit Freedom Now submitted a report detailing the case to the UN Human Rights Council during Morocco’s Universal Periodic Review.

In May 2017, Freedom Now and Robert F. Kennedy Human Rights submitted a petition to the UN Working Group on Arbitrary Detention on behalf of Mohamed al-Bambary. In June 2018, the Working Group determined that his detention is arbitrary and violates international law.

== See also ==
- Ali Salem Tamek
