= Elghalia Djimi =

Moroccan activist

Elghalia Djimi (Arabic: الغالية ادجيمي; born 28 May 1961) is the vice president of the organization Sahrawi Association of Victims of Grave Human Rights Violations Committed by the Moroccan State. In this organization she records accounts of human rights violations and also coordinates the work of the organization in the absence of the president. She is also a member of the Committee for the Families of Disappeared Saharawis.

== Biography ==
Elghalia Djimi was born in Agadir, Morocco in 1961. She was raised by her grandmother, who disappeared in 1984 and has never returned. Djimi herself was also subject to a forceful disappearance in 1981, and again between 1987 and 1991, after participating in a protest against Moroccan occupation of Western Sahara. This time, she was abducted together with the famous human rights defender Aminatou Haidar. During these three years and seven months in prison she was exposed to different forms of torture, and she still has traces of dog bites in her face, and no hair on her head because her scalp was burned with acid. In prison she met her husband, whom she married in 1991.

In 1994, Djimi started to meet with other Saharawis who had been imprisoned, but her coordination efforts were stopped the same year by the Moroccan authorities. In 1998 she succeeded in starting the work of meeting with other former prisoners and recording the human rights violations imposed on them, a work that continues up to this day.

She was imprisoned again in March 2006 and in December 2008.

She was later living in El Aiun, with her husband and five children.
