= Aït Melloul Prison =

Prison facility in Morocco

Aït Melloul Local Prison
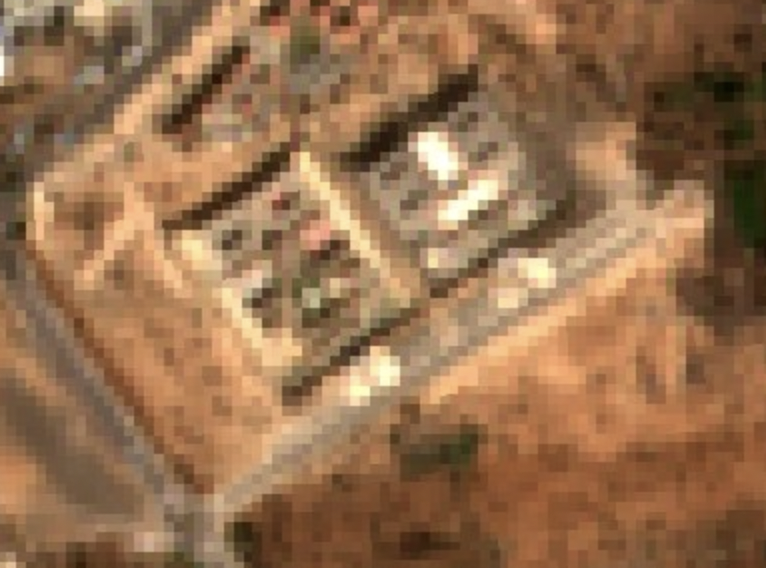
- Satellite photograph of the Aït Melloul 1 (right) and Aït Melloul 2 (left) jails

- Location in Morocco
- Location: Aït Melloul, Morocco; 30.324°N 9.480°W
- Status: Operational
- Security class: Minimum-maximum
- Opened: 2003
- Managed by: General Delegation for Prison Administration and Reintegration

Aït Melloul Prison is a prison located in the city of Aït Melloul, near Agadir. It consists of two facilities, the first opened in 2003, while the second was opened in 2016. It is the biggest prison in the Souss-Massa region.

== History ==
Construction for the prison began in 2001, before opening in 2003. A second facility was opened in 2016 in order to replace the historical prison in Inezgane. In 2018, 5 people were injured, and considerable damage was done after a fire broke out in a hallway. According to local firefighters, the fire was quickly put out.

== Criticism and scandals ==
Prison authorities were criticized during the COVID-19 pandemic for the lack of action to protect prisoners against the virus. A prisoner told Middle East Eye that the prison was "extremely filthy" and noted the "horrible conditions" of the prison. As of May 2020, there were 3 cases of COVID-19 in the prison.

A high-ranking official of the prison was charged with homosexuality and indecency after photos were released on social media of the official having sex with a Tunisian prisoner inside the prison.

In 2003, a student from Agadir, Abdelkarim Azzou, was arrested and taken to Aït Melloul Prison. Azzou claimed to be subject to "the cruelest form of torture that can exist" and was forced to sign a false confession, Azzou was detained without a trial for 2 years. Abdelkarim Azzou was sentenced to 20 years in prison for terrorism charges, the sentence was reduced to 12 years on appeal. He started a hunger strike in 2009.

== See also ==
- National Human Rights Council (Morocco)
- Association of the Families of Sahrawi Prisoners and Disappeared
- International Bureau for the Respect of Human Rights in Western Sahara
