= Solidar Silver Rose Award =

SOLIDAR's Silver Rose Awards were launched in 2000 to help raise the profile of individuals and organisations whose outstanding work is fuelled by vision and tireless commitment and whose achievements have contributed greatly to the struggle for a just and civil society.

Winners are sometimes well-known; others are ordinary people leading extraordinary lives, reaching out to the most vulnerable groups in their societies, advocating their rights, campaigning for their needs, and providing essential services such as soup kitchens, housing, children's holidays and literacy classes. As SOLIDAR's member organisations work on projects with local partners both in Europe and around the world, examples of worthy recipients are found.

The winners are always advocates of change, united by their passion, commitment and vision for bringing about a fairer and more just society. Among the winners from previous years are people, and organisations providing social support:

- Aminatou Haidar – President of the Sahrawi NGO Collective of Sahrawi Human Rights Defenders, which expose the human rights violations committed by Morocco in the occupied territories of Western Sahara
- Morgan Tsvangirai – President of the Zimbabwean Movement for Democratic Change and a key figure in the fight for human rights in Zimbabwe
- National League for Democracy of Burma – helped turn the spotlight on their struggle against Burma's military junta
- Chapitô (Portugal) – an arts centre, professional school of arts and circus school for young disadvantaged people and adults at risk of social exclusion
- Filo D’Argento (Italy) – a helpline set up for the elderly, offering support, conversation, and acting as a watchdog against abuse.

The Awards are presented each year at a ceremony held at the European Parliament in Brussels.
