= Elkouria Amidane =

Sahrawi activist

Elkouria "Rabab" Amidane
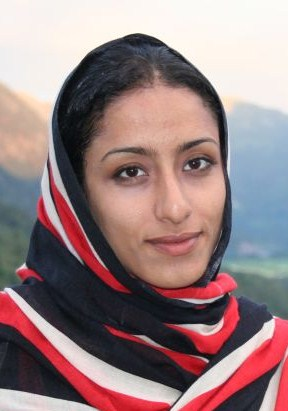
- Raba during a visit to Norway in 2007
- Born: 29 September 1985; El Aaiun, Western Sahara
- Occupation: Human rights defender
- Years active: 2005–2011
- Awards: Student Peace Prize (2009); Ordfront Democracy Prize (2011)

Elkouria Amidane (born 29 September 1985) is a Sahrawi student and human rights activist. Elkouria Amidane has over the years conducted non-violent struggle for self-determination in Western Sahara and demonstrated for Saharawi student's rights against Morocco. Elkouria Amidane was awarded the Student Peace Prize in 2009 for her work for human rights and the Saharawi people. Elkouria Amidane was awarded the Ordfront Democracy Prize at the Swedish parliament.

She denounced that Sahrawi students were discriminated in school, as they are recognized by their native language, Hassānīya. With help from international human rights organizations, she spread videos and photos documenting Moroccan human rights violations on the Sahrawi population and has been published by Amnesty International. For their political actions, Amidane and her family have been jailed and incarcerated, and the Moroccan police have frequently searched their house.

== Early life ==
The portions of Western Sahara was a Spanish Colony till 1975 as the last colonial province in Africa. A war erupted between those countries and the Sahrawi national liberation movement, the Polisario Front, which proclaimed the Sahrawi Arab Democratic Republic (SADR) with a government in exile in Tindouf, Algeria. Mauritania withdrew in 1979, and Morocco eventually secured de facto control of most of the territory, including all the major cities and natural resources.

Amidane went to primary school in her hometown of El Aaiun, where all the professors were Moroccan. She denounced that Sahrawi students were discriminated in school, as they are recognized by their native language, Hassānīya. Elkouria had to travel to Morocco for higher education, because, there are no universities in Western Sahara.

== Involvement in human rights defense ==
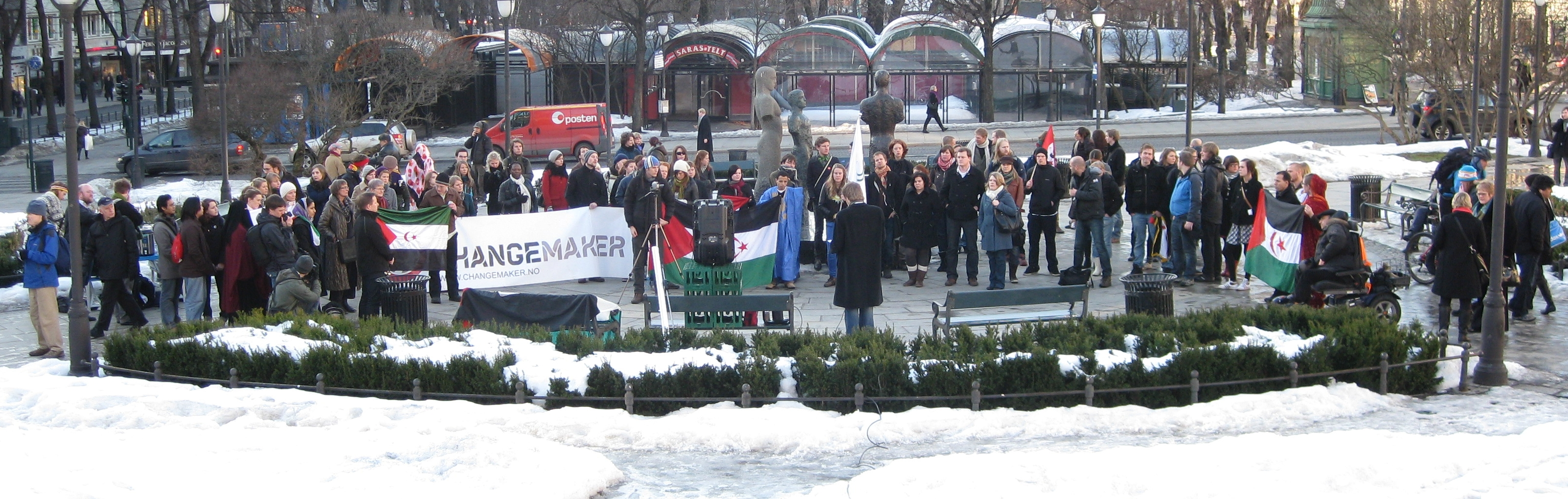
Demonstration in support of Rabab Amidane, 2009 Student Peace Prize laureate, outside the Norwegian parliament, Oslo, 11 March 2009

In 2005, the outburst of the Independence Intifada, her younger brother El Wali Amidane was arrested by the Moroccan police together with dozens of human rights defenders. The sentences were up to one year imprisonment. In 2006, El Wali Amidane was arrested again and was sentenced to 5 years of prison. Both Amidane and her family has been imprisoned and tortured due to their political activism. Frequently reported the abuse and detention of Amidane's family members, and the Moroccan police raid to their home.

From 20 July to 6 August 2007, as a 22-year-old, she had been a trip to Norway and Sweden meeting with students of different universities, narrating the struggles in Western Sahara. She met Mr. Truls Wickholm, a Parliamentarian in Sweden and various leaders of Labour Youth. She met the 200,000 strong Norwegian Student Union and the Norwegian Association of Students, who expressed the strong support for her cause. Most of the organizations sent a signed letter to the Government of Morocco to help protect the rights of Sahawari students.

Amidane aims to tell the world about Moroccan mistreatment of the Saharawi people. With help from international human rights organizations, she spread videos and photos documenting Moroccan human rights violations on the Sahrawi population, that had been used by NGOs like Amnesty International. On 4 February 2009, Elkouria Amidane was awarded the Student Peace Prize for her work for human rights and the Saharawi people.

On 21 October 2011, Elkouria Amidane was awarded the Ordfront Democracy Prize at the Swedish parliament.
