= Killing of Hamdi Lembarki =

Sahrawi activist (1974–2005)

Hamdi Lembarki
- حمدي لمباركي
- Born: Hamdi Lembarki Salek Mahayub; 1974; El Aaiun, Spanish Sahara
- Died: October 30, 2005 (aged 30–31); El Aaiun, Western Sahara
- Cause of death: Beating
- Occupation: Mutual organization employee

Hamdi Lembarki (Arabic: حمدي لمباركي; 1974 – 30 October 2005) was a Sahrawi activist who was killed by Moroccan police after a demonstration in El Aaiun, during the Second Sahrawi Intifada in 2005.

== Death and funeral ==
Hamdi Lembarki was detained by members of the Groupes urbains de sécurité during a demonstration on the night of 29 October 2005 in El Aaiun. He died hours later in police custody. While at first the Moroccan authorities claimed that Lembarki had died from wounds from other protestors who were throwing stones, eyewitnesses and the Association marocaine des droits humains affirmed that police beat him to death in the street. In November, in an unprecedented movement in the territory, two Moroccan policemen were processed for alleged tortures to Lembarki, which finally caused him death.

Hamdi Lembarki was buried on the Gdeim Izik cemetery, in the outskirts of El Aaiun, on January 14, 2006. Hundreds of Sahrawis participated in the funeral, some waving Saharawi Republic/POLISARIO flags.

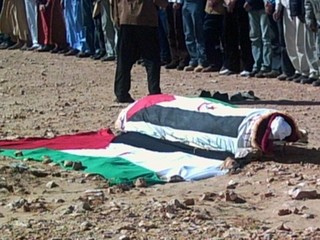
The remains of Hamdi Lembarki, covered with the Sahrawi Arab Democratic Republic flag, during his funeral in the outskirts of El Aaiun. Gdeim Izik (Western Sahara), 14 January 2006.

Finally, in June 2007, a Moroccan tribunal sentenced policemen Abderrahim Amssaued and Hassan Rochdi to 10 years in prison, for "involuntary homicide", but in March 2008 an appellate court reduced their sentences to two years and released the convicted policemen.

== Legacy ==
A Spanish solidarity association with the Sahrawi people from Palafrugell, Gerona, had named itself Lembarki in his memory.
