= Association of the Families of Sahrawi Prisoners and Disappeared =

Association of the Families of Sahrawi Prisoners and Disappeared رابطة أسر السجناء والمختفين الصحراويين Asociación de Familiares de Presos y Desaparecidos Saharauis
- Founded: August 20, 1989, Sahrawi refugee camps, Tindouf, Algeria
- Type: Non-profit NGO
- Location: Sahrawi refugee camps, Tindouf, Algeria
- Key people: Abdeslam Omar Lahcen, President
- Website: Arabic, Spanish

Asociación de Familiares de Presos y Desaparecidos Saharauis (AFAPREDESA) (Spanish for Association of Families of Sahrawi Prisoners and Disappeared), is an exile-based Sahrawi human rights organization, campaigning against human rights abuses perpetrated by Morocco against Sahrawi people in Western Sahara and even Morocco itself. It focuses especially on the question of the Sahrawi "disappeared", and had campaigned extensively in the past for the release of political prisoner Muhammad Daddach (imprisoned by Morocco between 1975 and 2002). It is the only Sahrawi human rights Non-governmental organization officially recognized by the Sahrawi Arab Democratic Republic. Due to this, it is banned in the Moroccan government-controlled part of Western Sahara, operating there clandestinely.

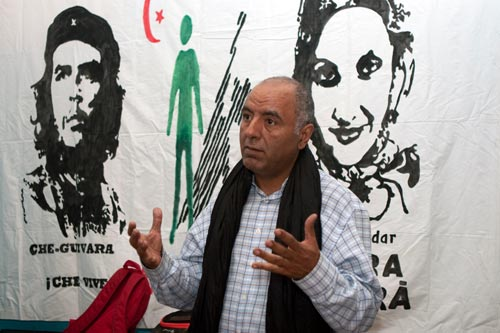
Abdeslam Omar Lahcen, president of AFAPREDESA

AFAPREDESA has its headquarters at the Sahrawi refugee camps at Tindouf Province, Algeria, where it was founded in August 1989, and a delegation office in Bilbao, Spain.

Since 1998, Abdeslam Omar Lahcen is the elected president of AFAPREDESA.

== Background ==
After Spain withdrew from its colony in 1975, Morocco initiated an antinationalist campaign in Western Sahara. This involved removing Politario members and their families and some of these people "disappeared" and have never been seen or heard of since. Reliable sources put their number as around a few hundred persons, but it is difficult to quantify this, as some whole families were among the victims. The International Federation of Human Rights Leagues thinks the figure may be as high as 1500, which would represent 1% of the total population of the country in 1974. AFAPREDESA has registered approximately 890 "disappeared" since 1975. Some 50 people died in custody, 310 have been released and the remaining 530 are unaccounted for.

== International membership ==
Since April 1997, it has the status of observer member in the African Commission on Human and Peoples' Rights and is also a full member of the International Coalition Against Enforced Disappearances (ICAED), participating in human rights commissions in the United Nations Human Rights Council, the United Nations Human Rights Committee, the European Parliament or the African Union.

The organization cooperates with many international human rights NGO's, like the Federation of Associations of Families of Disappeared (FEDEFAM), Amnesty International, the International Bureau for the Respect of Human Rights in Western Sahara (BIRDHSO), the Spanish Association for Human Rights (APDHE), or the World Organisation Against Torture (OMCT).

== See also ==
- Human rights in Western Sahara
- History of Western Sahara
- ASVDH
- BIRDHSO
