= International Bureau for the Respect of Human Rights in Western Sahara =

International Bureau for the Respect of Human Rights in Western Sahara Bureau International pour le Respect des Droits de l'Homme au Sahara Occidental
- Founded: March 16, 2002, Geneve, Switzerland
- Type: Non-profit; NGO
- Location: Geneve, Switzerland
- Key people: Christian Viret, President
- Website: http://www.birdhso.org/ (in French)

BIRDHSO (French: Bureau International pour le Respect des Droits de l'Homme au Sahara Occidental; Spanish: Oficina Internacional para el Respeto de los Derechos Humanos en el Sahara Occidental; English: International Bureau for the Respect of Human Rights in Western Sahara) is a Switzerland-based human rights organization campaigning against the human rights violations in Western Sahara. It has also delegations in France, Italy and Spain.

== Objectives ==
BIRDSHO objectives according to its statutes are:

- Assuring worldwide information as complete as possible about human rights violations in the framework of the Western Sahara conflict.
- Denouncing to international organisms (UN, ICRC among others) every human rights violation in the region.
- Assuring a permanent contact with international human rights organizations for being able to intervene at Moroccan authorities.
- Sustaining morally and materially the families and victims of Forced disappearance.
- Supporting by any means the work of Sahrawi human rights organizations in the occupied territories and abroad.

== El Karama ==
Before the BIRDHSO official foundation in 2002, and after a reunion in November 1993 in Rome, the collective had been releasing every year (since 1994) 3 or 4 informative bulletins entitled "El Karama" (Arabic, والكرامة; English, The Dignity) on the human rights situation in Western Sahara.

== See also ==
- Human rights in Western Sahara
- History of Western Sahara
- AFAPREDESA
- ASVDH
