= Mohamed Elmoutaoikil =

Sahrawi human rights activist (born 1966)

Mohamed Cheikh Elmoutaoikil
- الشيخ محمد المتوكل
- Born: October 10, 1966; Assa, Morocco
- Citizenship: Moroccan
- Occupation: Civil servant
- Known for: Human rights defender
- Spouse: Minatou Bainaho
- Children: three

Mohamed Cheikh Elmoutaoikil (Arabic: الشيخ محمد المتوكل; born October 10, 1966, in Assa, Morocco) (also transliterated as Mohammad al-Mutawakil) is a Sahrawi human rights activist working in Western Sahara and Morocco. He is a member of the Collective of Sahrawi Human Rights Defenders (CODESA).

== Background ==
Elmoutaoikil has a bachelor's degree in geology.

He was jailed after he was arrested during the 2005 "Independence Intifada". He was jailed in 1992 for one year, and was later arrested several more times. He worked as a civil servant in Casablanca (he was the secretary general of the municipality of Ben Msik, in Casablanca, in 2001). Previously, he had been secretary general of Assa's municipality, before being forced by Moroccan authorities to fled from Assa to Casablanca.

In 1992, he was sentenced to a year's imprisonment, for participating in the September 24 peaceful political demonstration to demand self-determination for the people of Western Sahara, in his hometown of Assa. He passed his sentence at Inzegane prison.

He had been a member of the Sahrawi branch of the human rights organization Forum for Truth and Justice until its illegalization and dissolution by the Moroccan authorities. He is currently a member of the Casablanca-based Forum for Truth and Justice section, that remains a legally registered association.

Elmoutaoikil was arrested again on 20 July 2005 at his house in Casablanca along with another CODESA activist, Mohamed Fadel Gaoudi. They were questioned about the ongoing events in Western Sahara, and then transferred to another police station in El Aaiún. He was then charged with "participating in and inciting violent protest activities". From 8 August to 29 September, he joined other imprisoned activists in a hunger strike.

Just before the trial, Amnesty International issued a report that expressed concerns that he was not getting a fair trial, and may be a prisoner of conscience.

== Family ==
Elmoutaoikil is married to Minatou Bainaho. He has three children.

== See also ==
- Mohamed Daddach
- Brahim Dahane
- Aminatou Haidar
- Ali Salem Tamek
