= Ali Salem Tamek =

Moroccan Sahrawi independence activist

- علي سالم التامك
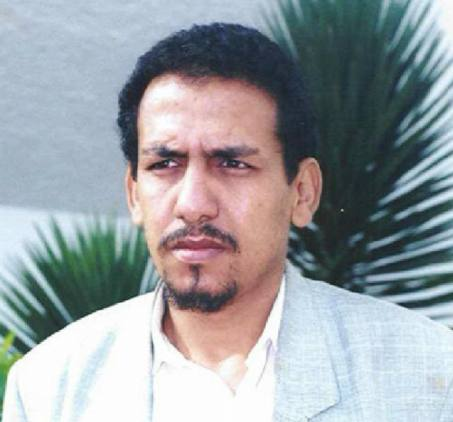
- Ali Salem Tamek in 2008
- Born: December 24, 1973 (age 52); Assa, Morocco
- Organization: Collective of Sahrawi Human Rights Defenders
- Known for: Human rights defender, trade unionist, Sahrawi nationalist
- Spouse: Aicha Chafia Ramdan
- Children: Thawra
- Parent(s): Mohamed Salem Ould El Mami Ould Mohamed Tamek (father), Fennina Bent Hammadi (mother)
- Awards: III "Juan Antonio González Caraballo" solidarity prize (2005); I "José Manuel Méndez" human rights and social justice prize (2010)

Ali Salem Tamek (Arabic: علي سالم التامك; born on December 24, 1973) is a Sahrawi independence activist and trade unionist.

Ali Salem Tamek was born in Assa, southern Morocco. He has emerged as one of the most outspoken Sahrawi dissidents under Moroccan rule. He was vice president of the Collective of Sahrawi Human Rights Defenders (CODESA). He was active in Moroccan trade unions and leftist Moroccan spheres.

== Biography ==
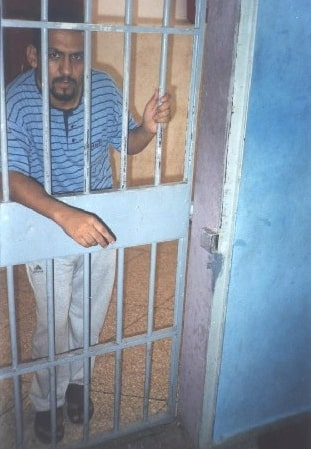
Ali Salem Tamek in Aït Melloul Prison

He has been jailed five times for nationalist activities, fired from his job, and for a long period of time had his passport confiscated. On September 13, 1993, he was detained for the first time, along with other Sahrawi independentists, on the Moroccan-Algerian border in the region of Tata, where he was attempting to join the Polisario Front. He was sentenced to one year in prison and a fine of 10,000 dirhams. On November 24, 1997, he was detained again near Dakhla while attempting to cross the border between Moroccan-controlled Western Sahara and Mauritania. Since 1997, he worked as a local administration worker in Tuesgui, Assa-Zag, but in April 2002 he was forced to move to Meknes. In late 2002, he was sentenced to 2 years of prison and a fine of 10,000 dirhams after being detained on August 26 in Rabat for "undermining the internal security of the state", as head of the Sahrawi branch of the human rights organization Forum for Truth and Justice. This led to him being referred to by Amnesty International as a prisoner of conscience.

During his incarceration, he has been on numerous hunger strikes, and was released in 2003 under a general royal pardon on January 7, 2004, on orders from the Equity and Reconciliation Commission. Due to the precarious conditions of detention in Moroccan jails, his health condition had worsened.

He has been the target of smear campaigns in the Moroccan press, and complains of politically motivated harassment and threats to his life and family. His wife, Aicha Ramdan, reported in 2005 that in 2003 she had been raped by five DST agents in front of her 3-year-old daughter, after a visit her husband at Aït Melloul Prison. She alleged that one of the police officers was Brahim Tamek, Ali Salem's cousin, and Mbarek Arsalane, both members of the General Directorate for National Security. She requested political asylum in Spain. The Moroccan National Social Security Fund had refused to recognize the name Tamek had given to his first daughter, Thawra, as it wasn't in the list of allowed names. The name means "revolution" in Arabic. For that reason, the family was not allowed to get family allowance.

On July 18, 2005, he was detained in El Aaiun airport while returning from Las Palmas de Gran Canaria, after touring Switzerland, Italy and Spain on conferences supporting the independence of Western Sahara. The magazine Maroc Hebdo International put him in its July 2005 cover with the heading "Public Enemy Nº 1". The European Parliament called for his "immediate release" in a resolution on October 27. On December 14, Ali Salem Tamek was sentenced to 8 months in prison by a Moroccan court in El-Aaiún, being accused of incitement to trouble the public order during an intifada. Both before and after the trial, Amnesty International issued reports with concerns that Ali Salem Tamek and other Sahrawi independence activists were not getting fair trials, and may be prisoners of conscience. He was released again under a general royal pardon in April 2006.

Tamek completed his baccalauréat in 2007 at the age 34. He reportedly was not allowed to study law and journalism after graduating.

On October 8, 2009, he was arrested with six other Sahrawi independentists and human rights activists (known as "The Casablanca 7") at Casablanca Airport, after returning from visiting family members at the Sahrawi refugee camps in Tindouf, Algeria. The judge accused them of "threatening state security", and sent the case to a military court. They were declared prisoners of conscience by Amnesty International.

Tamek, Brahim Dahhane, and Ahmed Nasiri were freed on 23 April 2011, shortly before they were set to begin a hunger strike to protest the conditions of their imprisonment.

== Awards and nominations ==
On June 10, 2005, he was awarded with the III "Juan Antonio González Caraballo" Solidarity Prize, in a ceremony in Seville (Spain).

On March 14, 2010, he was awarded with the I "Jose Manuel Méndez" human rights and social justice prize, given by the citizens platform "Asamblea por Tenerife".

== See also ==
- Mohamed al-Bambary
- Mohamed Elmoutaoikil
- Aminatou Haidar
- Mohammed Daddach
- Brahim Dahane

== Related links ==
- Call of Thawra (Letter to Ali Salem Tamek from his daughter)
- Photo of Tamek on his 2004 prison release, in his hometown of Assa
