= Aminatou Haidar =

Sahrawi political activist (born 1966)

- أميناتو حيدر
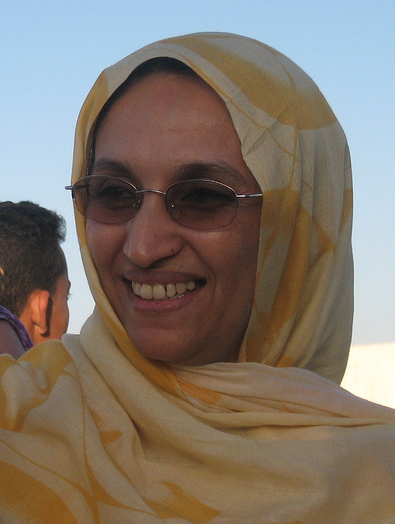
- Haidar after her departure from prison in 2006
- Born: 24 July 1966 (age 60); Akka, Morocco
- Occupation: Human rights defender
- Years active: 1987–present
- Organization: Collective of Sahrawi Human Rights Defenders
- Known for: forced disappearance, hunger strikes
- Children: Hayat; Mohammed
- Parents: Ali Haidar (father); Darya Mohamed Fadel Lorosi Busaula (mother)
- Awards: Solidar Silver Rose Award (2007); Robert F. Kennedy Human Rights Award (2008); Civil Courage Prize (2009); Right Livelihood Award (2019)

Aminatou Ali Ahmed Haidar (Arabic: أميناتو علي أحمد حيدر; born 24 July 1966), sometimes spelled as Aminetou, Aminatu or Aminetu, is a Sahrawi human rights activist and an advocate of the independence of Western Sahara. She is often called the "Sahrawi Gandhi" or "Sahrawi Pasionaria" for her nonviolent protests. She is the president of the Collective of Sahrawi Human Rights Defenders (CODESA). She was imprisoned from 1987 to 1991 and from 2005 to 2006 on charges related to her independence advocacy. In 2009, she attracted international attention when she staged a hunger strike in Lanzarote Airport after being denied re-entry into Moroccan Western Sahara. Haidar has won several international human rights awards for her work, including the 2008 Robert F. Kennedy Human Rights Award, 2009 Civil Courage Prize and 2019 Right Livelihood Award.

== Background ==
While her parents lived in Tan-Tan, a small city in southern Morocco with significant Sahrawi population (and former Spanish Cape Juby) where she passed her childhood, Aminatou was born in 1966 in Akka, in the Moroccan province of Tata, her grandmother's town, due to a bedouin tradition. She is not a member of the Polisario Front, although she considers the movement as the only representative of the Sahrawi people. She is divorced with two children, Hayat and Mohammed.

== 1987–1991 forced disappearance ==
In 1987, Haidar participated in a nonviolent demonstration against Moroccan administration of Western Sahara. Along with many other attendees, she was subjected to forced disappearance by Moroccan authorities and held without trial until 1991, when she was released. According to Kerry Kennedy of the Robert F. Kennedy Center for Justice and Human Rights, Haidar was "gagged, starved, sleep deprived, subjected to electric shock, severely beaten – and worse" during her imprisonment.

Moroccan authorities gave no explanation for her detention. Amnesty International (AI) stated that she appeared to have been held for her peaceful advocacy for Western Sahara self-determination.

== 2005–2006 imprisonment ==
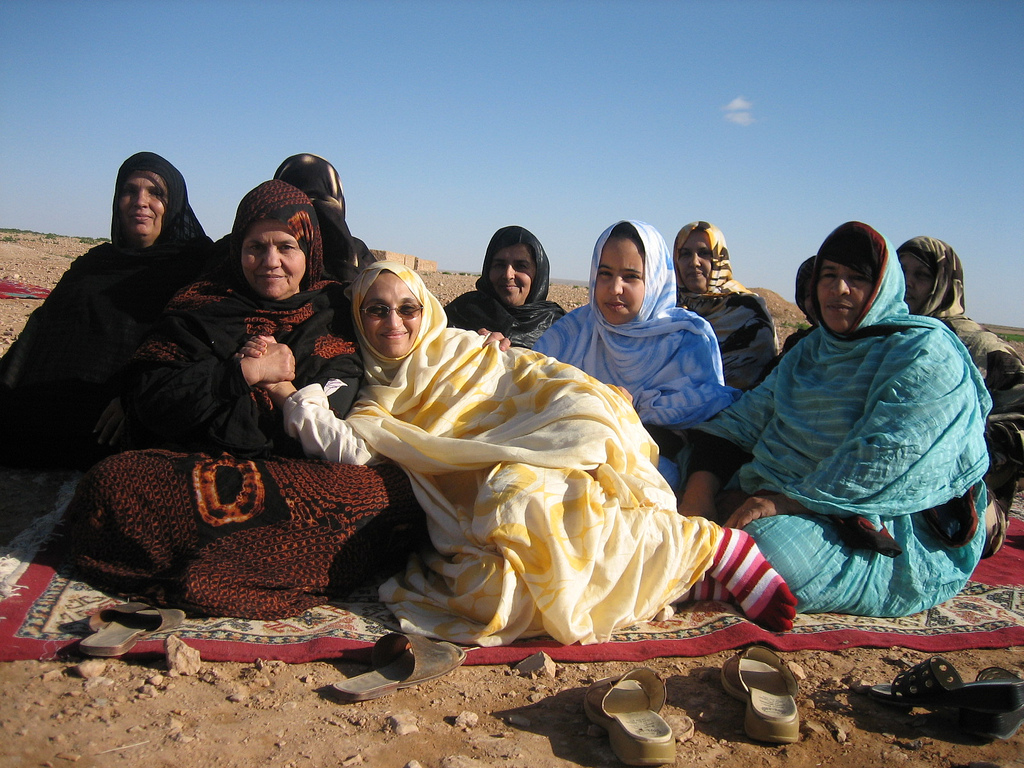
Aminatou Haidar with friends in Lemleihess (Western Sahara), after her release from prison (18 January 2006)

On 17 June 2005, Aminatou Haidar was attacked by the Moroccan police on her way to a demonstration in El Aaiún for the Western Sahara Independence Intifada. After admission to Belmehdi Hasan hospital and receiving twelve stitches for a head injury, she was arrested on charges of "participation in violent protest activities and incitement" and "belonging to an unauthorized association". She was then held in El Aaiún's Black Prison. She reportedly went on hunger strike from 8 August to 29 September to demand an investigation into torture allegations by fellow Saharawi detainees Houssein Lidri and Brahim Noumria as well as improved conditions of detention.

On 14 December, she was sentenced to seven months in prison by the El Aaiún Court of Appeal. AI, which had sent an observer to cover the trial, declared that "the trial ... may have been unfair. The organization is consequently strengthened in its belief that the seven human rights defenders may be prisoners of conscience". The European Parliament also called for her immediate release along with that of Ali Salem Tamek and 37 other "political prisoners" in a 27 October 2005 resolution.

On 17 January 2006, Aminatou Haidar was released at the end of her sentence. She stated that "the joy is incomplete without the release of all Saharawi political prisoners, and without the liberation of all the territories of the homeland still under the occupation of the oppressor".

== 2009 Lanzarote Airport hunger strike ==
On 13 November 2009, Haidar was detained by Moroccan authorities at the airport in El-Aaiún when she attempted to return from a trip to Lanzarote in the Canary Islands, Spain, to collect a prize. Under citizenship, she had refused to state her nationality as "Moroccan". The authorities denied her re-entry, confiscated her passport, and sent her back to the Canary Islands without it. Two Spanish journalists who had accompanied her were also detained for several hours. A Moroccan official called her refusal to call herself Moroccan as "an act of treason" and stated that Haidar would not be allowed to return to El-Aaiún until she apologized. The Spanish newspaper El País later published documents demonstrating that the Moroccan government made three different flight reservations for Haidar prior to her return, indicating that they had planned to expel her in advance.

On arriving at Lanzarote Airport, Haidar began a hunger strike. She accused Spanish officials of holding her against her will by not allowing her to return to Western Sahara without a passport. On 17 November, the airport management firm Aena filed charges against her for disturbing the public order. She was required to attend court in Arrecife and fined 180 euros.

=== International support ===
UN High Commissioner for Human Rights Navi Pillay called on 9 December for Morocco to allow Haidar to return. Human Rights Watch stated that Morocco "must reverse its expulsion of Sahrawi rights activist Aminatou Haidar and allow her to enter her country of nationality". while Amnesty International condemned her expulsion as part of a pattern of "growing intolerance" by the Moroccan government.

A number of activists and celebrities also expressed support for Haidar during her strike. Portuguese Nobel Prize-winning writer José Saramago, who owned a home in Lanzarote, sent her a letter in November stating that "If I were in Lanzarote, I would be with you". On 1 December, he met her at the airport, stating, "It's time for the international community to pressure Morocco to comply with the accords about the Sahara".

Argentinian Nobel Peace Prize laureate Adolfo Pérez Esquivel asked for a "humanitarian and political exit" for Haidar, and called on the Spanish and Moroccan governments to undertake dialogue to see "in what ways could the European Union, Council of Europe or even the United Nations intervene to avoid a tragic outcome and try to save her life, but not at any cost." British filmmakers Ken Loach and Paul Laverty compared Haidar to U.S. civil rights activist Rosa Parks, stating, "What tragedy would be for the non-violent resistance, and for the possibility of a pacific solution, that we let her die." Statements of support were also issued by Uruguayan journalist Eduardo Galeano, Spanish actor Javier Bardem, US Senator Jim Inhofe, Guatemalan Peace Prize laureate Rigoberta Menchú, British musician Brian Eno, and Spanish novelist Alberto Vázquez-Figueroa.

On 29 November, a group of Spanish singers and musicians gave a free concert in support of Haidar in Rivas-Vaciamadrid, on the outskirts of Madrid. Performers included Bebe, Kiko Veneno, Macaco, Amaral, Pedro Guerra, Mariem Hassan, Conchita, Miguel Ríos, and Ismael Serrano. On 10 December, dozens of artists and activists sent an open letter to Juan Carlos I of Spain, asking him to intercede for Haidar with Morocco. Signatories included three Nobel laureates – Günter Grass, Dario Fo, and Saramago – as well as Pedro Almodóvar, Mario Vargas Llosa, Penélope Cruz, Antonio Gala, Almudena Grandes, Carlos Fuentes, and Ignacio Ramonet among others from India, Puerto Rico, Portugal, Colombia, Brazil and Angola.

=== Diplomatic resolution ===
Spanish foreign minister Miguel Ángel Moratinos offered to arrange a Spanish passport for Haidar, but she refused his offer, demanding the return of her original passport. A Moroccan delegation led by the President of the Moroccan Senate, Mohamed Cheikh Biadillah, visited Spain in early December 2009. Biadillah stated that the Sahrawi people are fully integrated into Moroccan society and occupy some of the highest offices in Moroccan institutions, and that no country would accept the return of a person who had "thrown away their passport" and "has renounced their nationality".

By 7 December, three weeks into her hunger strike, Haidar had become too weak to stand and slipped in and out of consciousness. A Lanzarote Hospital doctor reported that she might have only hours to live. Spain attempted again to apply for her re-entry to the country, but backed down when Morocco threatened to end cooperation on illegal immigration, drug trafficking, and other issues. On 11 December, US Secretary of State Hillary Clinton also contacted the Moroccan Foreign Minister Taieb Fassi Fihri to request Haidar's re-entry.

On 17 December, after being unable to swallow liquid for two days, Haidar was admitted to the hospital. She continued to refuse to break her fast. Late that night, Moroccan authorities relented, and Haidar was allowed on a plane back to El-Aaiún. The Spanish foreign ministry attributed the resolution to "a co-ordinated effort between Spain, France and the US" to persuade Moroccan government that its refusal to re-admit Haidar was counterproductive. Appearing before a crowd in the El-Aaiún airport, Haidar stated, "This is a triumph, a victory for human rights, for international justice and for the cause of Western Sahara ... And it's all thanks to your pressure." Moroccan officials stated that the government was "committed to respecting human rights in Western Sahara and elsewhere in the country" but refused to comment on Haidar's case.

Upon her return, Haidar was placed under house arrest by Moroccan police, and journalists were blocked from speaking with her.

== Post hunger-strike work ==
On 19 January 2010, Haidar returned to Spain to have medical exams in La Paz hospital in Madrid. Haidar has a Spanish residence card since her 2006 release. Haidar was in poor health, as she suffered anaemia and stomach ulcer, consequence of her imprisonment and the 2009 hunger strike. Amnesty International reported that Haidar and her family were under constant surveillance by Moroccan security forces and were being harassed and intimidated by them.

On 7 March, Haidar spoke at a conference at the University of Granada during a European Union-Morocco summit in the same city. Haidar stated that the summit "denied the suffering of the Sahrawis" and that the EU was appeasing the "totalitarian regime" of Morocco, sacrificing human rights in favor of economic interests. On 24 March, Haidar stated during a visit to Washington, D.C. that "before reaching a final settlement, a political solution, we must put pressure on Morocco to respect human rights". In meeting with US Department of State officials and US representatives, she urged them to pressure Morocco for Sahrawi rights.

On 15 October, Haidar appeared in a Casablanca court with dozens of Sahrawi activist leaders and twenty foreign observers, during the trial of seven Sahrawi activists (known as "The Casablanca 7"). The "Casablanca 7" had been detained months before after travelling to the Sahrawi refugee camps, and were accused by the Moroccan government of threatening the safety of the state. One of them was Ali Salem Tamek, vice president of Haidar's human rights association CODESA. She said that Moroccan government accusations had no foundation and denounced them as violations of the freedom of expression and of travel of the detained. She also criticized the Spanish government, which she accused of being guilty in the Sahrawi people's situation: "The Spanish government violate international law by denying the Saharawi people their legitimate right to self-determination".

On 29 October 2011, Haidar's son was threatened with sexual violation and a beating that would cause him permanent disability by a couple of Moroccan policemen in El Aaiun, according to CODESA. On 8 July 2012, Sahrawi human rights sources stated that Haidar's children had been physically injured by some Moroccan passengers when they were travelling by bus from Agadir to El Aaiun. Human rights groups as the Sahrawi ASVDH and the North-American Robert F. Kennedy Center for Justice and Human Rights condemned the aggression, calling for an investigation.

On 1 November 2012, the same day she met UN Special Commissioner for the Western Sahara Christopher Ross at El Aaiun MINURSO HQ, Haidar stated that she had been later attacked by Moroccan police during a non-violent protest. Human rights organizations such as the RFK Center, Front Line Defenders and the Spanish political party Union, Progress and Democracy condemned the aggression.

In January 2024, after a period during which the Spanish authorities refused to allow her re-entry in Spain, the Spanish Ministry of the Interior issued an extension of her 16-year-old residence permit in Spain, allowing her to return to Las Palmas de Gran Canaria from a trip to the occupied territories to bid farewell to an ill family member.

== Awards and recognition ==
Haidar has won several international awards in recognition of her human rights work. In December 2005, she won the V Juan María Bandrés Award of the Spanish Commission for Refugee Aid (CEAR). Due to her imprisonment, she could not receive the award until May 2006. In 2007, she was awarded the Solidar Silver Rose Award, a European network of NGOs. The annual award acknowledges "the outstanding achievements of individuals and organizations who are active in the fight for social justice." In 2008, Haidar won the Robert F. Kennedy Human Rights Award of the US-based Robert F. Kennedy Center for Justice & Human Rights. In addition to the prize (which includes a financial component), the RFK Memorial Center offers to partner with recipients in their work. US Senator Edward Kennedy stated that "all who care about democracy, human rights, and the rule of law for the people of the Western Sahara are inspired by her extraordinary courage, dedication and skilled work on their behalf." Haidar was also awarded the 2009 Civil Courage Prize of the Train Foundation. Prize founder John Train stated, "A healthy society relies on civil courage, and we hope that by recognizing it in people like Aminatou Haidar, we can encourage others to follow in her footsteps and defend peacefully their civil rights."

In 2010, 40 members of the European Parliament nominated Haidar for the organization's Sakharov Prize for Freedom of Thought. EP member Willy Meyer Pleite denounced a campaign of letters by Morocco protesting the possible awarding of the prize to Haidar. The prize was eventually awarded to Cuban hunger striker Guillermo Fariñas.

Haidar has also been named an honorary citizen or otherwise decorated by numerous Spanish and Italian institutions. In October 2006, she was named "Honorary Citizen" by the town council of Naples for her activity on defending human rights. In May 2008, she was awarded a Special Prize by the city council of Castelldefels, Spain. In January 2010, the Italian municipality of Sesto Fiorentino appointed Haidar as "Honorary Citizen" of the village, for her "non-violent struggle for liberty and human rights for her people". Days later, another Italian municipality, Campi Bisenzio, decided by a majority to grant her the "Honorary Citizenship". In February, it was the Tuscan town of Signa who decided to confer Haidar the honorary citizenship. In March, the town of Leganés, Spain, awarded her its Dolores Ibárruri Prize. On 13 April, the comune of Pontedera gave her honorary citizenship. On 30 July, another ten towns from the Italian province of Lucca gave honorary citizenship to Haidar. One of them, Stazzema, also gave her the "Gold Medal of Resistance". A further 20 Italian towns later declared Aminatou Haidar an "Honorary Citizen". On 27 July 2011, Haidar was made an honorary citizen of the Italian commune of Montespertoli as a "concrete gesture of condemnation of the violence being perpetrated by the Moroccan authorities". The city council of San Fernando de Henares, Spain, awarded her its Jesús Andrés López Gallardo prize. On 10 November 2011, she was awarded the René Cassin Human Rights Prize, given by the Justice department of the Basque Country government; the prize came with an award of 16,550 euros. On 4 March 2013, the Italian city of Florence awarded Haidar the honorary citizenship of the town. Also in March, Haidar won the 13th Bremen Solidarity Award, a prize given to personalities who are distinguished by their compromise with liberty, democracy and human rights, and against colonialism and racism in the world. The prize, given by the regional government of the Free Hanseatic City of Bremen with a financial award of 10,000 euros, was given to Haidar for her trajectory in the peaceful struggle for a solution for the Sahrawi conflict, and her defence of the human rights of the Sahrawi people in the occupied territories.

In May 2013, Haidar travelled to Addis Ababa, as she was invited as a guest of honour to the African Union Golden Jubilee.

Aminatou Haidar has won the Right Livelihood Award in 2019 "for her steadfast nonviolent action, despite imprisonment and torture, in pursuit of justice and self-determination for the people of Western Sahara."

== See also ==
- Years of lead
- Mohamed Elmoutaoikil
- Mohammed Daddach
- Brahim Dahane
- History of Western Sahara
