= Second Sahrawi Intifada =

Part of the Western Sahara conflict

Independence Intifada
- Part of Western Sahara conflict
- Date: 21 May – 14 December 2005
- Location: Western Sahara
- Caused by: Transfer of a Sahrawi prisoner from El Aaiun to Agadir
- Goals: Independence of Western Sahara; Respect of human rights
- Methods: Demonstrations; Civil resistance; Rioting
- Result: Sahrawi failure to gain independence

Parties
(Sahrawi Arab Democratic Republic) Pro-Independence Sahrawis	Government of Morocco: General Inspectorate of Auxiliary Forces; Royal Moroccan Gendarmerie; Urban Security Groups

Number
Hundreds	

Casualties and losses
1 civilian killed dozens wounded	

The Independence Intifada or the Second Sahrawi Intifada (intifada is Arabic for "uprising") and also May Intifada is a Sahrawi activist term for a series of disturbances, demonstrations and riots that broke out in May 2005 in the Moroccan-controlled parts of Western Sahara and south of Morocco. This event has also been called The El-Aaiun Intifada by the same sources.

== Background ==
Western Sahara, formerly Spanish Sahara, was annexed by Morocco in 1975, as Spain pulled out. A war with the Polisario Front, which according to the UN represent the indigenous Sahrawi population, and was backed by neighboring Algeria, ensued. In 1991 a cease-fire was agreed upon, on the condition of a referendum on self-determination (including the options of independence or integration into Morocco). Since 1991 the terms of a referendum have been subject to years of dispute between the parties, although the cease-fire continues to hold despite remaining tensions. Morocco controls the majority of the territory, with Polisario forces controlling a rump. A UN mission MINURSO mission patrols the demarcation line.

Sahrawi political activity in the Moroccan-controlled parts of Western Sahara remains severely restricted, and police crackdowns and forced disappearances were a frequent response to civil protest. The political climate gradually relaxed in the 1990s, after the cease-fire, and following considerable liberalization in Morocco proper. Since political liberalization, intermittent protests have broken out and pro-Polisario groups have declaring minor "intifadas" in 1999 and 2000, often resulting in dozens of demonstrators being arrested.

== Demonstrations and arrests ==
Demonstrations began on 21 May 2005 in El Aaiún, after relatives protesting the transfer of a Sahrawi prisoner accused of drug dealing and insulting the Moroccan monarchy to a prison in Agadir were violently dispersed by police, provoking further demonstrations over the next several days. Protests spread by the end of May to other towns in the Western Sahara, such as Smara and Dakhla, and were accompanied by demonstrations by Sahrawi students living in Moroccan cities such as Agadir, Casablanca, Fes, Marrakech and Rabat. Moroccan public security units quelled the disturbances, although some subsequent pro-independence demonstrations have subsequently flared up, most recently reported in November 2005. On 30 October 2005, a first fatality was recorded when 31-year-old Hamdi Lembarki died after what human rights organizations assured was police brutality during his arrest, although at first Moroccan authorities attributed his death to an accident.

Over a hundred pro-Polisario Sahrawi protesters were reported arrested by Moroccan authorities by international human rights, and approximately thirty demonstrators and well-known Sahrawi human rights-activists have been imprisoned after summary trials. Among them are the former political prisoner Ali Salem Tamek (who did not partake directly in any demonstrations, but was arrested when returning from abroad), human rights-activist Mohamed Elmoutaoikil, and Aminatou Haidar, a former disappeared. An international campaign for her release was signed by 178 members of the European Parliament, and she was nominated as a candidate for the Sakharov Prize. A 50-day hunger strike of all the arrested Sahrawis put the health of several at risk, and the action was aborted.

On 14 December 2005, 14 pro-independence Sahrawis and human-rights activists, including the activists mentioned above and most of the remaining pro-Polisario Sahrawi political leadership, were sentenced to between six months and three years in prison by an El-Aaiún court, on charges of disturbing public order, membership of illegal associations, incitement to unrest, damaging public property and rioting. They denied the charges of using violence. Both Amnesty International and Human Rights Watch had expressed serious concern over the trials, pointing to reports of torture and previous abuse of some of the prisoners.

== International reactions ==
Several international human rights-organizations have shown interest in alleged Moroccan abuse of Sahrawi demonstrators. Amnesty International has demanded an investigation into reports of torture of prisoners and called for fair trials, and the release of political prisoners. This has been echoed by Human Rights Watch and others.

Morocco has limited journalists' and diplomats' access to the territory, claiming that their public presence is used by pro-Polisario activists to trigger more riots. Investigative missions from European countries have been denied access to the territory, including several high-ranking parliamentary delegations and foreign ambassadors to Morocco. Several foreign journalists, mainly European, but also al Jazeera correspondents, were expelled after interviewing protesters, and others have been prevented from visiting it. In November 2005, Moroccan authorities shut down a number of pro-independence or pro-Polisario Internet sites. This was condemned by Reporters Without Borders as an example of internet censorship.

The European Parliament voted 98 in favor, 1 abstention and 0 votes against an October 2005 resolution that "deplored" expulsions of journalists covering the uprising and demanded the "immediate release" of political prisoners.

== See also ==
- Human rights in Western Sahara
- Human rights in Morocco
- Years of lead
- Zemla Intifada
- Sahrawi refugee camps
