= Mohammed Daddach =

Sahrawi human rights activist

Sidi Mohammed Daddach
- سيدي محمد دداش
- Born: 1957 (age 67–68); Guelta Zemmur, Spanish Sahara
- Known for: Human rights defender, political activist
- Parent: Enguia Bakay Lahbib (mother)
- Awards: Rafto Prize (2002); Badajoz Bar Association Human Rights Award (2009)

Sidi Mohammed Daddach (Arabic: سيدي محمد دداش; born 1957) is a Sahrawi human rights activist imprisoned for 24 years. He is often called "North African Mandela" or "Sahrawi Mandela".

== Biography ==
In 1973 he joined the Polisario Front, the Western Sahara national liberation movement. In early 1976, as the Moroccan & Mauritanian troops invaded Western Sahara, Daddach fled with some friends trying to reach Tindouf to join the Polisario Front troops (Sahrawi People's Liberation Army), but their jeep was gunned & intercepted by Moroccan troops near Amgala. After two years of imprisonment (first in a military base in Marrakesh, then in a subterranean cell), he was forced to join the Moroccan Army.

Daddach was again arrested & badly injured in August 1979, when he tried to defect with other soldiers, and sentenced to death on April 7, 1980 for high treason. He was imprisoned in Kenitra prison. Amnesty International designated him a prisoner of conscience, and other human rights organizations also called for his release. In 1994, his death sentence was reduced to life imprisonment, and in 2001, he was freed following a royal amnesty by Mohammed VI of Morocco, who described it as coming from "affection for the sons of the Sahara".

In 2002, Daddach was awarded the Rafto Prize for his efforts, and after some difficulties obtaining a passport, he was finally able to go to collect the prize in Norway, where he also saw his mother, Enguia Bakay Lahbib, for the first time since 1975. She presently lives in exile in the refugee camps of Tindouf, Algeria.

In 2009, he was awarded with the Human Rights Award of the Badajoz Bar Association, for his defense of Human Rights. The prize was given by Guillermo Fernández Vara, president of Extremadura.

According to the Association de soutien à un référendum libre et régulier au Sahara Occidental (ARSO), he was repeatedly pressured and harassed by Moroccan security services after his release.

On 29 April 2013, he was one of the nine Sahrawis injured during demonstrations in El Aaiun. Daddach needed hospital attention for a wound in one of his knees.

== See also ==
- History of Western Sahara
- Mohamed Elmoutaoikil
- Aminatou Haidar
- Ali Salem Tamek
- Brahim Dahane
