= 1976 =

1976 in various calendars
- Gregorian calendar: 1976; MCMLXXVI
- Ab urbe condita: 2729
- Armenian calendar: 1425; ԹՎ ՌՆԻԵ
- Assyrian calendar: 6726
- Baháʼí calendar: 132–133
- Balinese saka calendar: 1897–1898
- Bengali calendar: 1382–1383
- Berber calendar: 2926
- British Regnal year: 24 Eliz. 2 – 25 Eliz. 2
- Buddhist calendar: 2520
- Burmese calendar: 1338
- Byzantine calendar: 7484–7485
- Chinese calendar: 乙卯年 (Wood Rabbit); 4673 or 4466 — to — 丙辰年 (Fire Dragon); 4674 or 4467
- Coptic calendar: 1692–1693
- Discordian calendar: 3142
- Ethiopian calendar: 1968–1969
- Hebrew calendar: 5736–5737
- Hindu calendars
- Vikram Samvat: 2032–2033
- Shaka Samvat: 1897–1898
- Kali Yuga: 5076–5077
- Holocene calendar: 11976
- Igbo calendar: 976–977
- Iranian calendar: 1354–1355
- Islamic calendar: 1395–1397
- Japanese calendar: Shōwa 51 (昭和５１年)
- Javanese calendar: 1907–1908
- Juche calendar: 65
- Julian calendar: Gregorian minus 13 days
- Korean calendar: 4309
- Minguo calendar: ROC 65 民國65年
- Nanakshahi calendar: 508
- Thai solar calendar: 2519
- Tibetan calendar: ཤིང་མོ་ཡོས་ལོ་ (female Wood-Hare); 2102 or 1721 or 949 — to — མེ་ཕོ་འབྲུག་ལོ་ (male Fire-Dragon); 2103 or 1722 or 950
- Unix time: 189302400 – 220924799

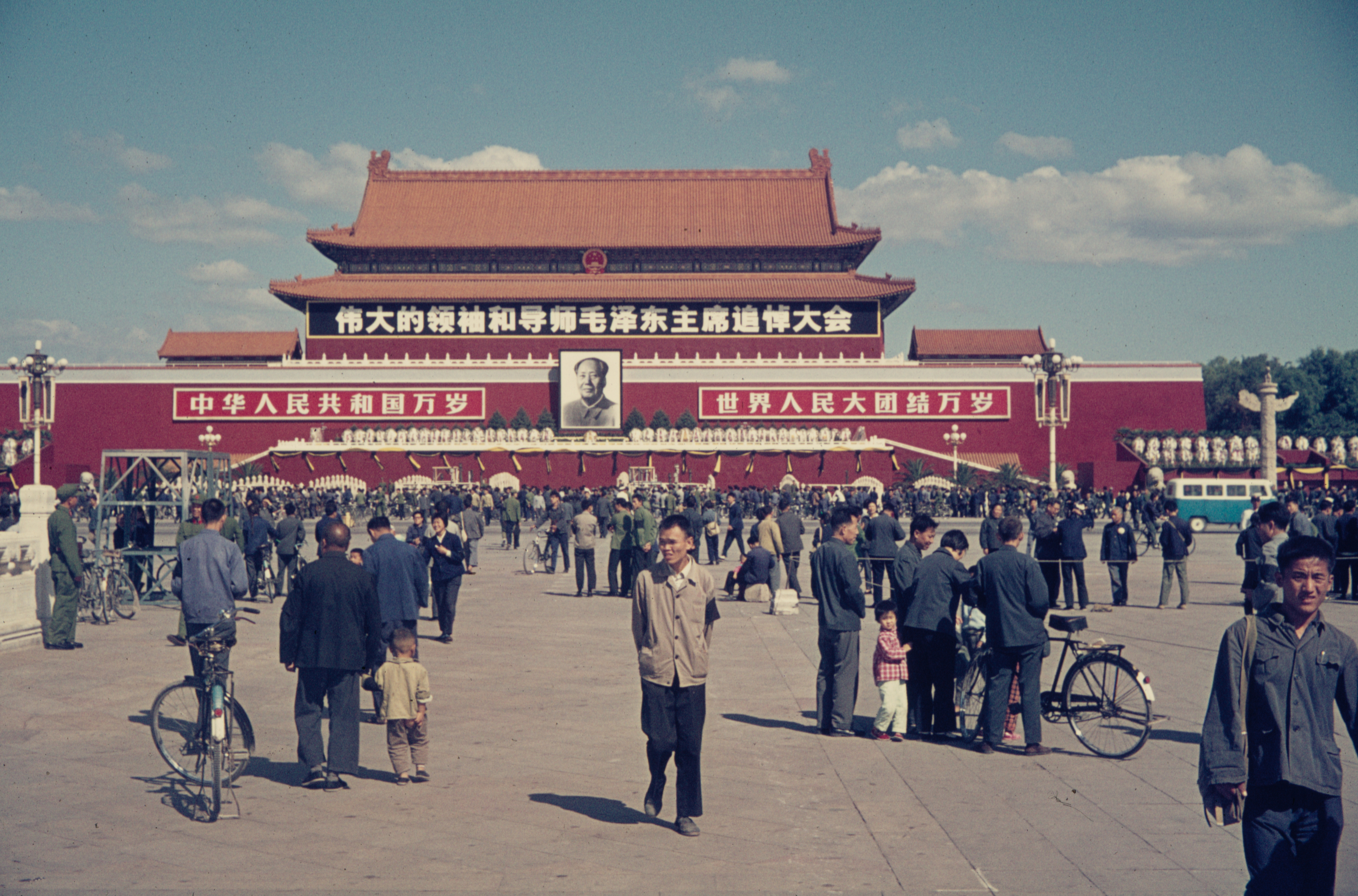
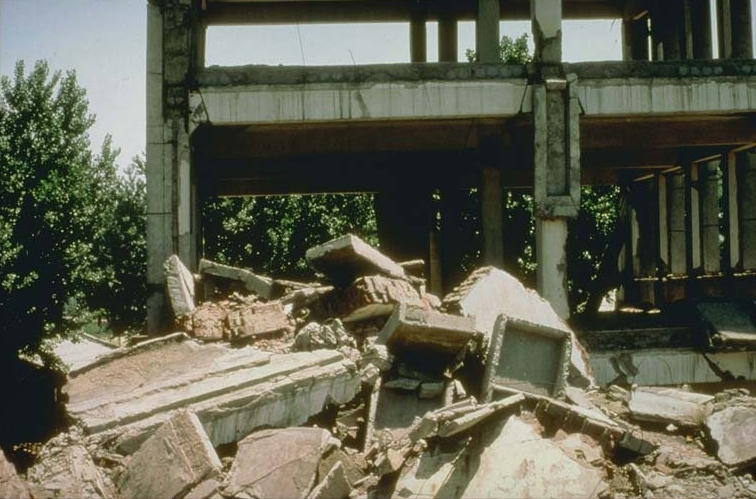
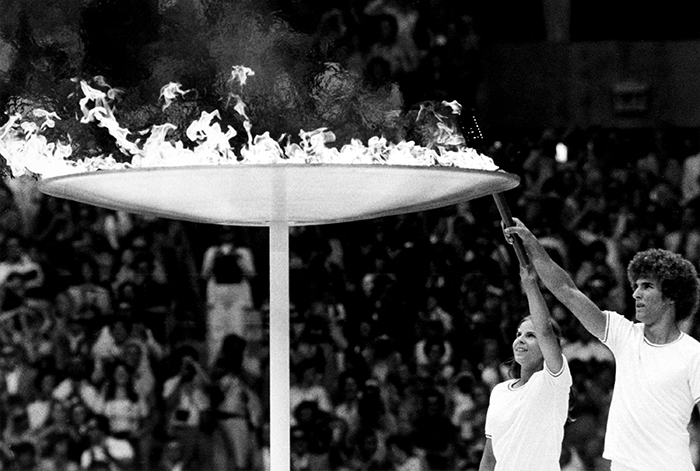
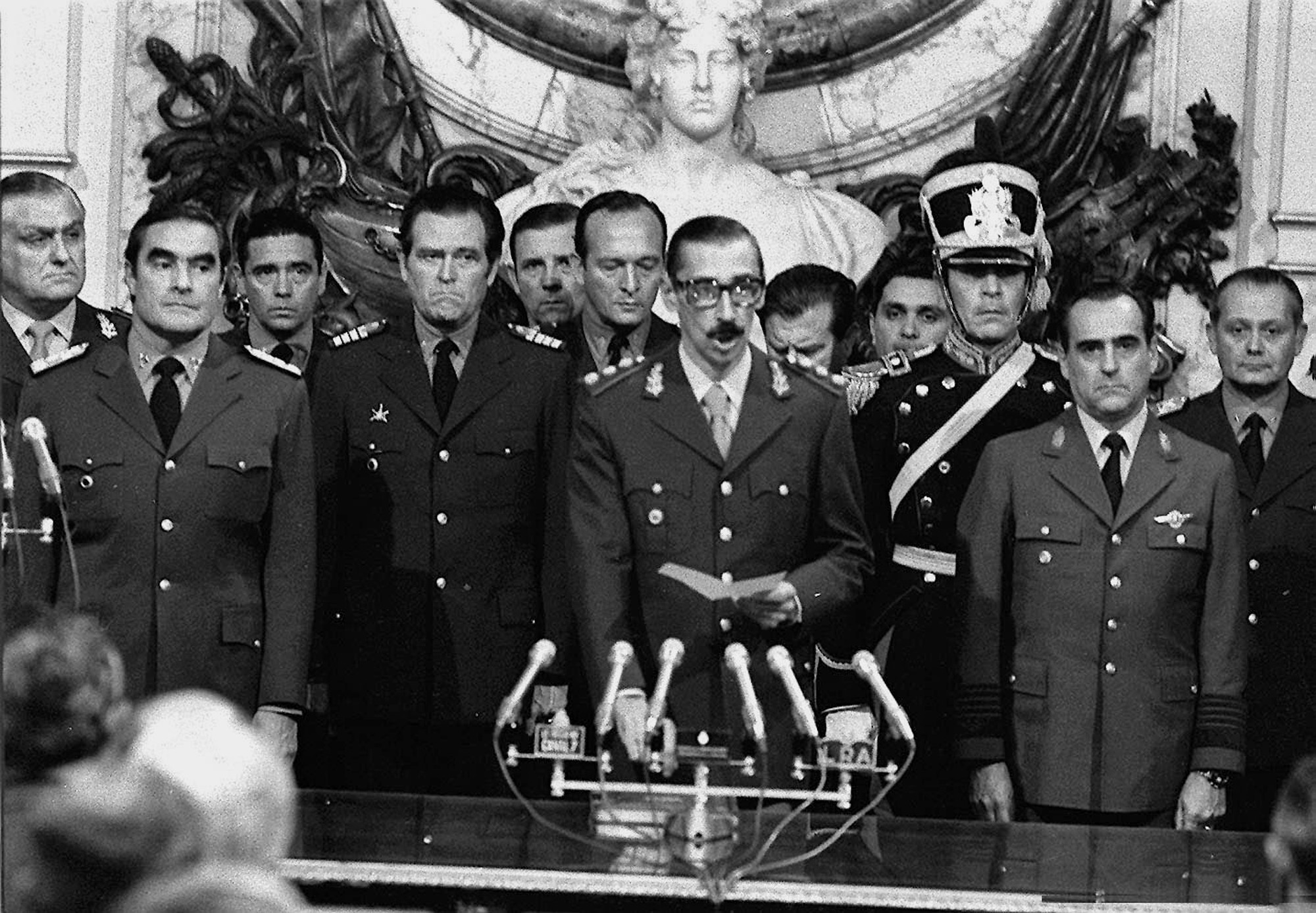
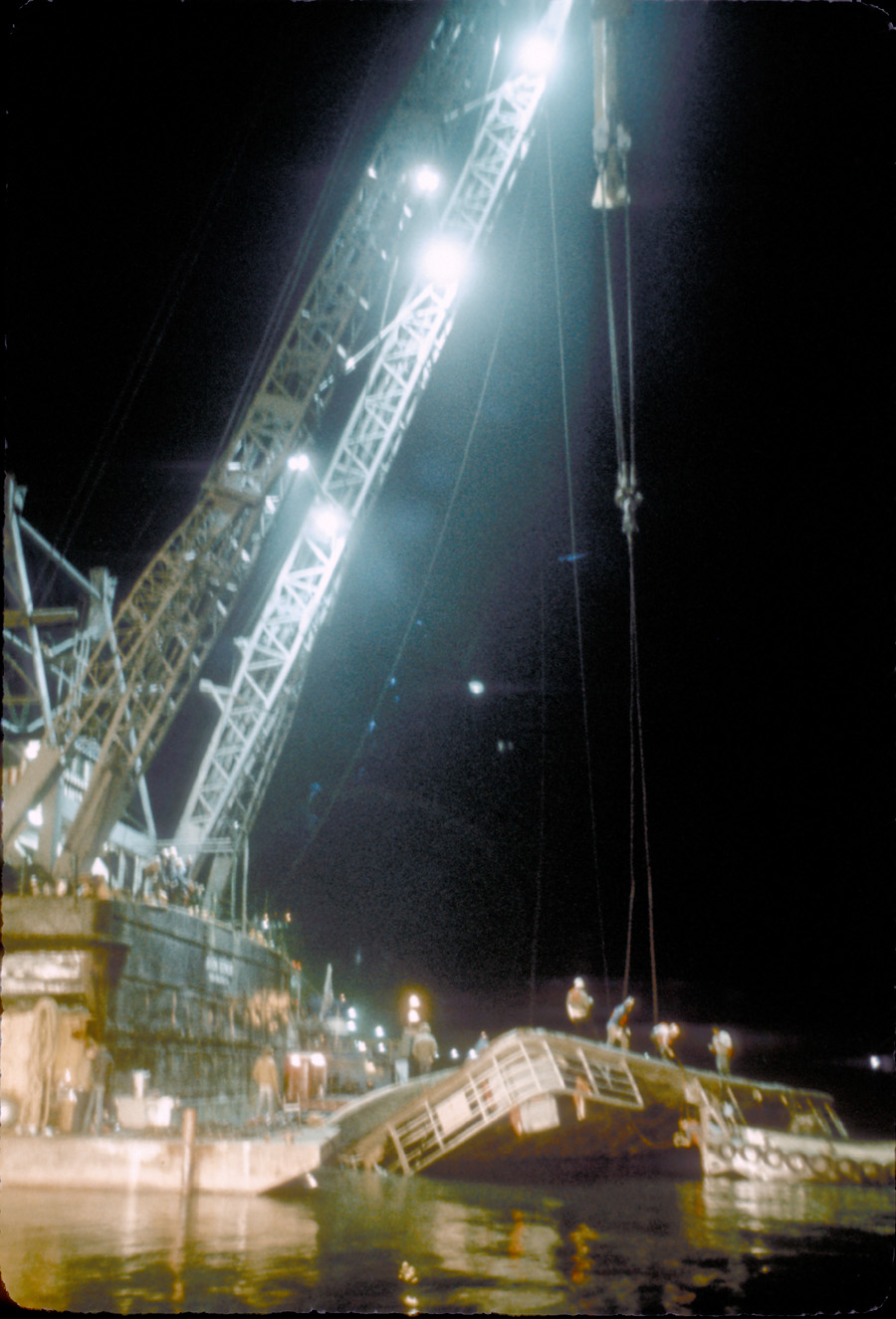
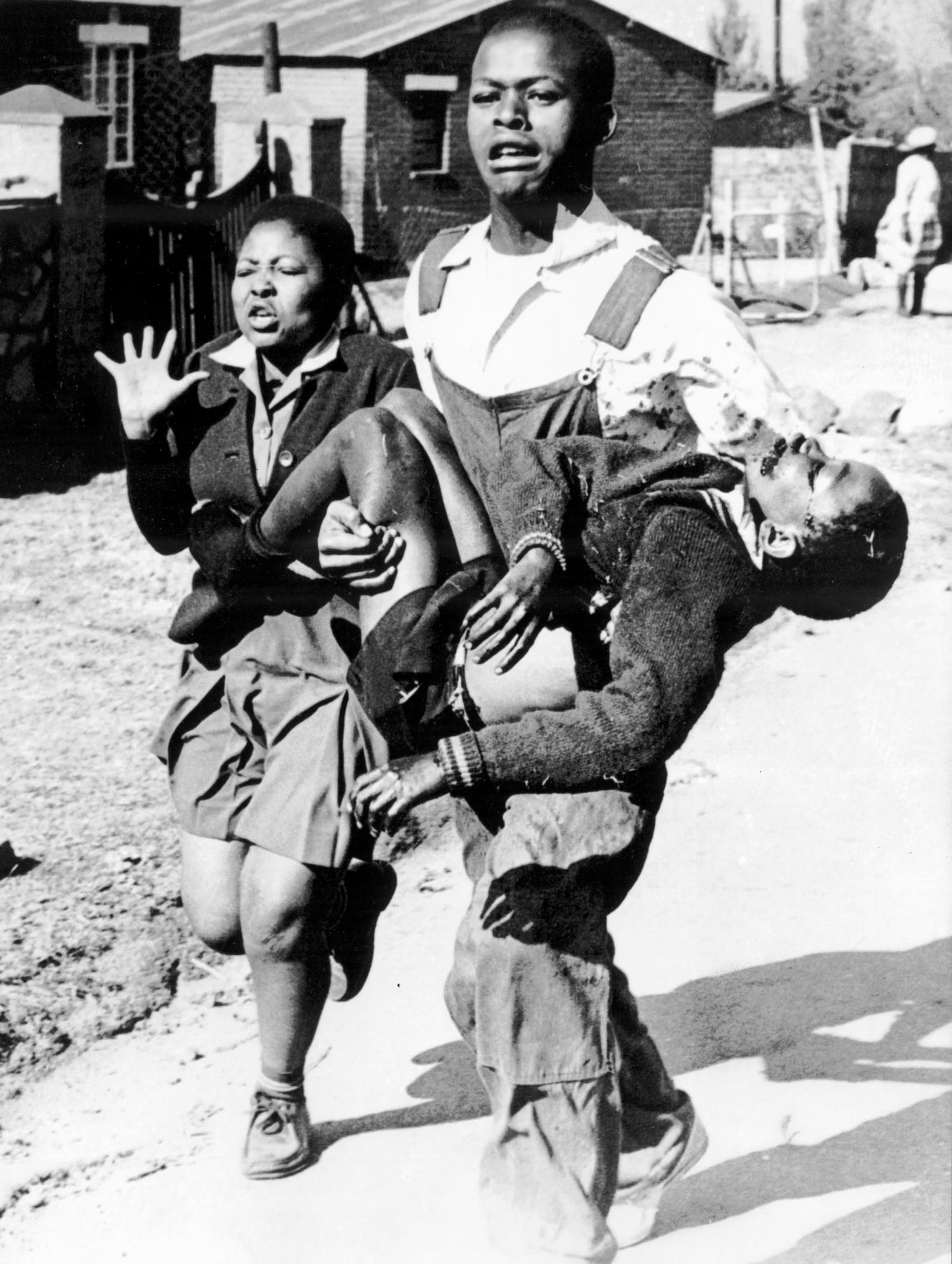
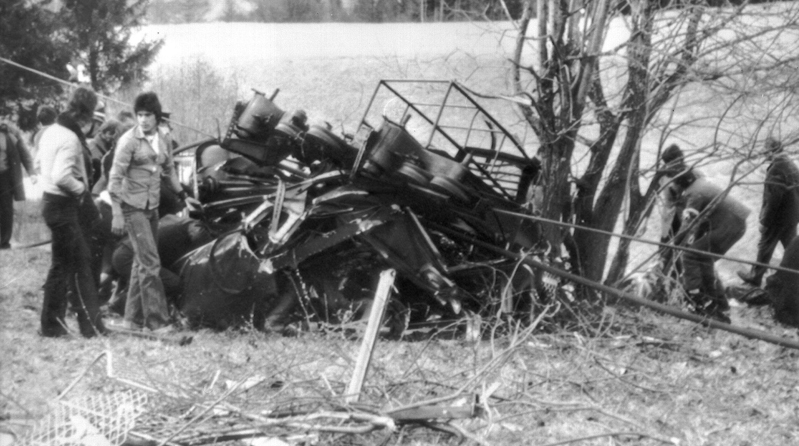
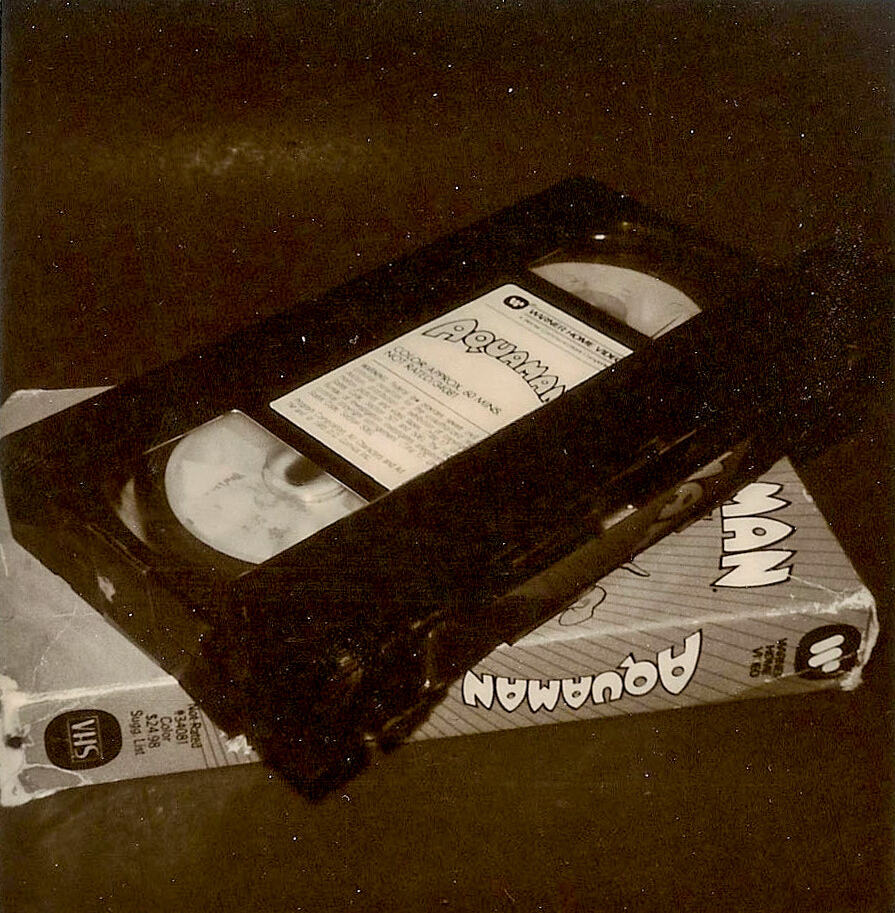
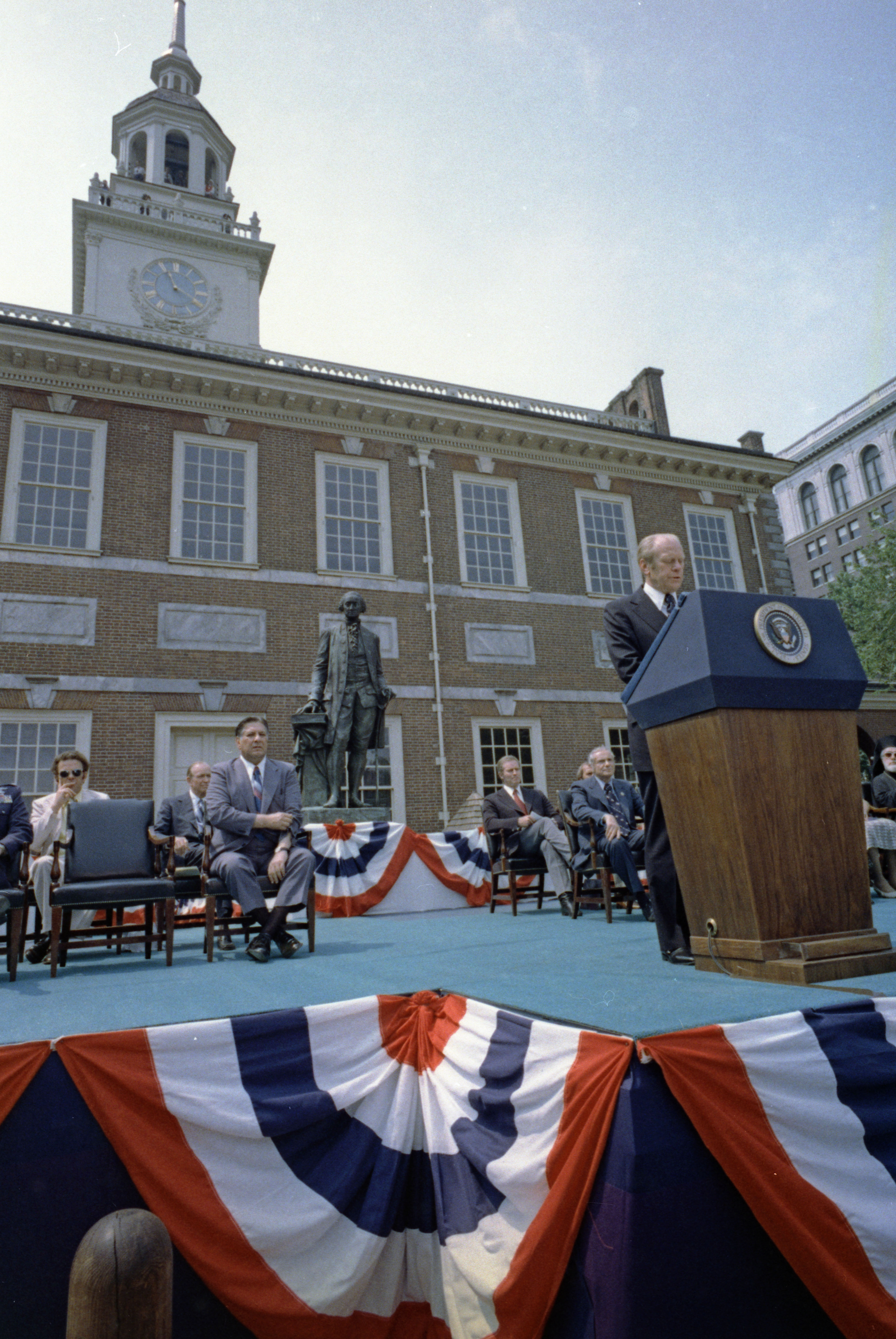
From top to bottom, left to right: Mao Zedong dies, ending a political era in China; the 1976 Tangshan earthquake kills over 240,000 people; the 1976 Summer Olympics in Montreal face boycotts and controversy; the 1976 Argentine coup d'état topples Isabel Perón; the MV George Prince ferry disaster kills 78 people in Louisiana; the Soweto uprising erupts against apartheid in South Africa; the 1976 Cavalese cable car crash in Italy kills 43; the debut of VHS transforms home video; and the U.S. celebrates its Bicentennial.

1976 (MCMLXXVI) was a leap year starting on Thursday of the Gregorian calendar, the 1976th year of the Common Era (CE) and Anno Domini (AD) designations, the 976th year of the 2nd millennium, the 76th year of the 20th century, and the 7th year of the 1970s decade.

== Events ==
=== January ===
- January 2 – The International Covenant on Economic, Social and Cultural Rights enters into force.
- January 5 – The Pol Pot regime proclaims a new constitution for Democratic Kampuchea.
- January 16 – A locomotive crashes into the rear of a commuter train in Glenbrook, Australia, killing one person onboard and injuring ten others in the 1976 Glenbrook rail accident.
- January 18 – Full diplomatic relations are established between Bangladesh and Pakistan 5 years after the Bangladesh Liberation War.
- January 27
  - The United States vetoes a United Nations resolution that calls for an independent Palestinian state.
  - Western Sahara War: The First Battle of Amgala breaks out between Morocco and Algeria in the Spanish Sahara.

=== February ===
- February 4
  - The 1976 Winter Olympics begin in Innsbruck, Austria.
  - The 7.5 M_{w} Guatemala earthquake affects Guatemala and Honduras with a maximum Mercalli intensity of IX (Violent), leaving 23,000 dead and 76,000 injured.
- February 9 – The Australian Defence Force is formed by unification of the Australian Army, the Royal Australian Navy and the Royal Australian Air Force.
- February 13 – General Murtala Mohammed of Nigeria is assassinated in a military coup.
- February 24 – Cuba's constitution of 1976 is enacted.
- February 26 – The Spanish Armed Forces withdraw from Western Sahara.
- February 27 – The Polisario Front, Western Sahara's national liberation movement, declares independence of the territory under the name "Sahrawi Arab Democratic Republic".

=== March ===
- March – The Cray-1, the first commercially developed supercomputer, is released by Seymour Cray's Cray Research, with the first purchaser being the Energy Research and Development Administration (ERDA) in Los Alamos, New Mexico.
- March 1
  - U.K. Home Secretary Merlyn Rees ends Special Category Status for those sentenced for scheduled terrorist crimes relating to the civil violence in Northern Ireland.
  - Bradford Bishop allegedly murders five of his family members in Bethesda, Maryland. The crime goes undiscovered for 10 days and the suspect is never caught. From 2014 to 2018 he is on the FBI Ten Most Wanted Fugitives list.
- March 4
  - The Northern Ireland Constitutional Convention is formally dissolved in Northern Ireland, resulting in Direct rule over Northern Ireland by the Government of the United Kingdom in London.
  - The Maguire Seven are found guilty in London of possessing explosives for use by the Provisional Irish Republican Army and subsequently jailed for 14 years; their convictions were overturned in 1991.
- March 9 – A cable car disaster occurs when a supporting cable breaks in Cavalese, Italy, resulting in 43 deaths.
- March 9–11 – Two coal mine explosions claim 26 lives at the Blue Diamond Coal Co. Scotia Mine, in Letcher County, Kentucky.
- March 16 – Harold Wilson resigns as Prime Minister of the United Kingdom.
- March 20 – Patty Hearst is found guilty of armed robbery of a San Francisco bank in 1974.
- March 24
  - Argentina military forces depose president Isabel Perón.
  - A general strike takes place in the People's Republic of the Congo.
- March 26
  - The Body Shop, the retail chain for skin care products and cosmetics founded by Anita Roddick, opens its first branch in Brighton, England.
- March 27
  - The South African Defence Force withdraws from Angola and concludes Operation Savannah.
  - The first 7.4 kilometres (4.6 mi) of the Washington Metro subway system opens.
- March 29 – The military dictatorship of General Jorge Rafael Videla comes to power in Argentina.
- March 31 – The New Jersey Supreme Court rules that patient in a persistent vegetative state in the Karen Ann Quinlan case can be disconnected from her ventilator. She remains comatose and dies in 1985.

=== April ===
- April 1
  - Apple Computer Company is formed by Steve Jobs and Steve Wozniak in California.
  - Conrail (Consolidated Rails Corporation) is formed by the U.S. government, to take control of 13 major Northeast Class-1 railroads that have filed for bankruptcy protection. Conrail takes control at midnight, as a government-owned and operated railroad until 1986, when it is sold to the public.
  - The Jovian–Plutonian gravitational effect is first reported by British astronomer Patrick Moore.
- April 2 – Norodom Sihanouk is forced to resign as Head of State of Kampuchea by the Khmer Rouge led by Pol Pot and is placed under house arrest.
- April 3 – The Eurovision Song Contest 1976 is won by Brotherhood of Man, representing the United Kingdom, with their song Save Your Kisses for Me.
- April 5
  - James Callaghan becomes Prime Minister of the United Kingdom.
  - Tiananmen Incident: Large crowds lay wreaths at Beijing's Monument of the Martyrs to commemorate the death of Premier Zhou Enlai. Poems against the Gang of Four are also displayed, provoking a police crackdown.
  - Segovia prison break: in Spain's largest prison break since the Spanish Civil War, 29 political prisoners escape from Segovia prison.
- April 12
  - The 1976 West Bank local elections were held.
- April 13
  - The Lapua Cartridge Factory explosion in Lapua, Finland kills 40.
  - The United States Treasury Department reintroduces the two-dollar bill as a Federal Reserve Note on Thomas Jefferson's 233rd birthday as part of the United States Bicentennial celebration.
- April 16 – As a measure to curb population growth, the minimum age for marriage in India is raised to 21 years for men and 18 years for women.
- April 19 – A violent F5 tornado strikes around Brownwood, Texas, injuring 11 people. Two people were thrown at least 1,000 yards (910 m) by the tornado and survived uninjured.
- April 21 – The Great Bookie Robbery in Melbourne, Australia: Bandits steal A$1.4 million in bookmakers' settlements from Queen Street, Melbourne.
- April 25 – Portugal's new constitution is enacted.
- April 29 – Sino-Soviet split: A concealed bomb explodes at the gates of the Soviet embassy in China, killing four Chinese. The targets were embassy employees, returning from lunch, but on this day they had returned to the embassy earlier.

=== May ===
- May 1 – Neville Wran becomes Premier of New South Wales.
- May 4
  - The first LAGEOS (Laser Geodynamics Satellite) is launched.
  - A train crash in Schiedam, the Netherlands, kills 24 people.
- May 6 – An earthquake hits the Friuli area in Italy, killing more than 900 people and making another 100,000 homeless.
- May 9 – Ulrike Meinhof of the Red Army Faction is found hanged in an apparent suicide in her Stuttgart-Stammheim prison cell.
- May 11
  - U.S. President Gerald Ford signs the Federal Election Campaign Act.
  - An accident involving a tanker truck carrying anhydrous ammonia takes place in Houston, Texas, resulting in the deaths of 7 people.
- May 13 – The Atari video arcade game Breakout is released.
- May 16 – The Montreal Canadiens sweep the Philadelphia Flyers in four games to win the Stanley Cup in ice hockey.
- May 21 – The Yuba City bus disaster, the second-worst bus crash in U.S. history, leaves 28 students and one teacher killed.
- May 24
  - Washington, D.C. Concorde service begins.
  - The Judgment of Paris pits French vs. California wines in a blind taste-test in Paris, France. California wines win the contest, surprising the wine world and opening the wine industry to newcomers in several countries.
- May 25 – U.S. President Gerald Ford defeats challenger Ronald Reagan in 3 Republican presidential primaries: Kentucky, Tennessee and Oregon.
- May 30 – Indianapolis 500 automobile race: Johnny Rutherford wins the (rain-shortened) shortest race in event history to date, at 102 laps or 408 kilometres (254 mi).
- May 31 – Syria intervenes in the Lebanese Civil War in opposition to the Palestine Liberation Organization, which it has previously supported.

=== June ===
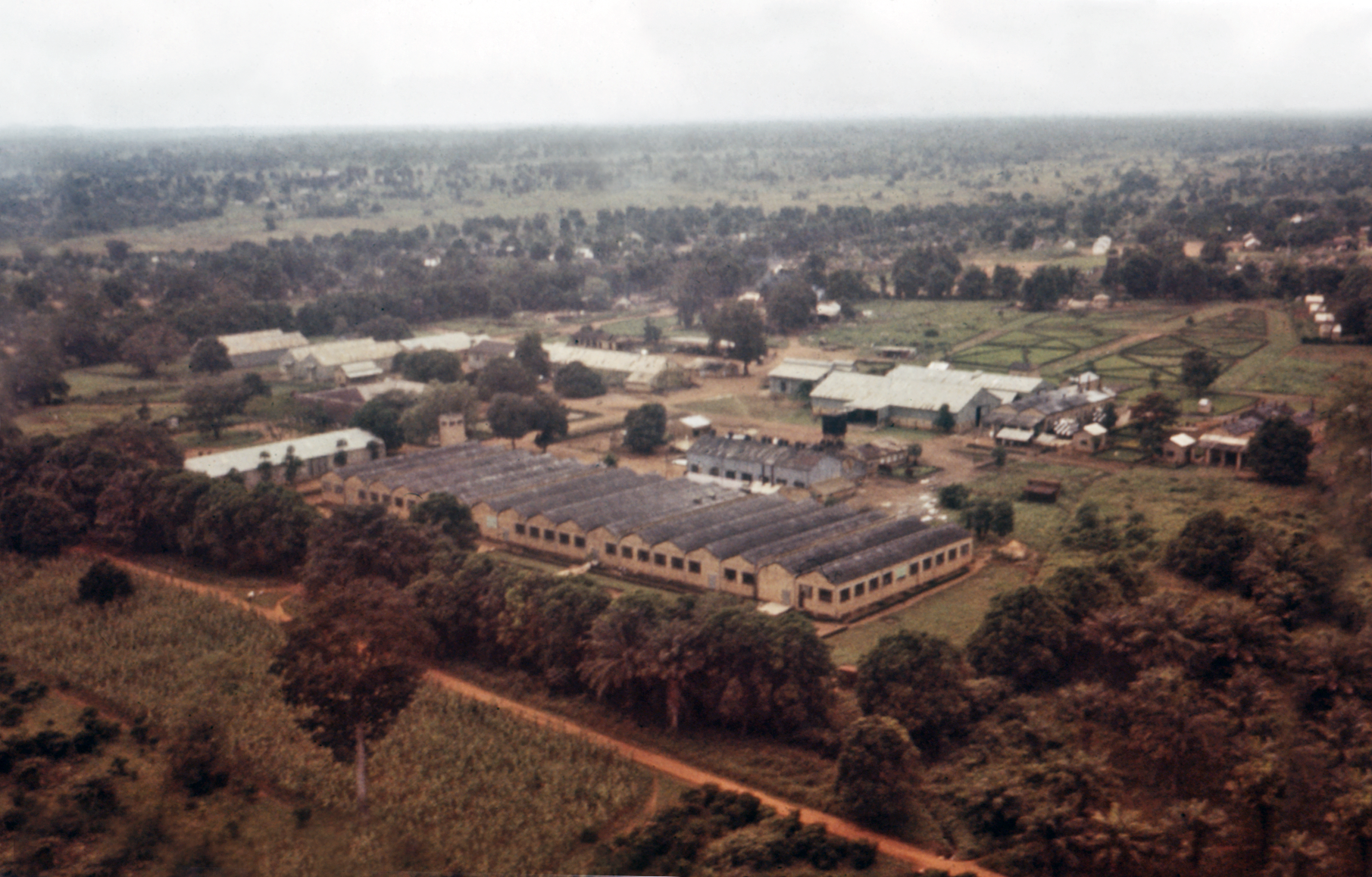
June 27: A cotton factory in Nzara, Sudan (now South Sudan) which is suspected to be the source of the 1976 Ebola outbreak in Sudan

- June 1 – The United Kingdom and Iceland end the Third Cod War, with the UK accepting Iceland's extension of its territorial waters to 200 nautical miles in exchange for defined fishing rights.
- June 2
  - A car bomb fatally injures Arizona Republic reporter Don Bolles.
  - The Philippine government opens relations with the Soviet Union.
- June 4 – The Boston Celtics defeat the Phoenix Suns 128–126 in triple overtime in Game 5 of the National Basketball Association Finals at the Boston Garden. In 1997, the game is selected by a panel of experts as the greatest of the NBA's first 50 years.
- June 5 – The Teton Dam collapses in southeast Idaho in the US, killing 11 people.
- June 6 – The Double Six Crash, a plane crash in Kota Kinabalu, Malaysia, kills everyone on board, including Sabahan Chief Minister Tun Fuad Stephens.
- June 11 - Prince Philip, Duke of Edinburgh gathers 126 of the UK's leading engineers at Buckingham Palace to form the Fellowship of Engineering, later to be known as the Royal Academy of Engineering.
- June 12 – Alberto Demicheli, a jurist, is inaugurated as a civilian de facto President of Uruguay after Juan María Bordaberry is deposed by the military.
- June 13 – Savage thunderstorms roll through the state of Iowa, spawning several tornadoes, including an F-5 tornado that destroys the town of Jordan.
- June 16 – The Soweto uprising in South Africa begins.
- June 20
  - Hundreds of Western tourists are moved from Beirut and taken to safety in Syria by the U.S. military, following the murder of the U.S. Ambassador.
  - General elections are held in Italy, resulting in the best result for the Communist Party (PCI) in a general election.
  - Czechoslovakia beats West Germany 5–3 on penalties to win Euro 76 when the game ends 2–2 after extra time.
- June 25 – Strikes start in Poland (Ursus, Radom, Płock) after communists raise food prices; they end on June 30.
- June 26 – The CN Tower is opened in Toronto, the tallest free-standing land structure opens to the public.
- June 27
  - G-6 is renamed "Group of 7" (G-7) with the inclusion of Canada.
  - Palestinian militants hijack an Air France plane in Greece with 246 passengers and 12 crew. They take it to Entebbe, Uganda.
  - The world's first known case of Ebola is recorded in Nzara, Sudan (now South Sudan).
- June 29
  - Seychelles gains independence from the United Kingdom.
  - The Conference of Communist and Workers Parties of Europe convenes in East Berlin.

=== July ===
- July 2 – North Vietnam dissolves the Provisional Government of South Vietnam and unites the two countries to form the Socialist Republic of Vietnam.
- July 3
  - Gregg v. Georgia: The Supreme Court of the United States rules that the death penalty is not inherently cruel or unusual and is a constitutionally acceptable form of punishment overturning the Furman v. Georgia case of 1972.
  - The great heat wave in the United Kingdom, which is currently suffering from drought conditions, reaches its peak.
- July 4 – Entebbe Raid: Israeli airborne commandos free 103 hostages being held by Palestinian hijackers of an Air France plane at Uganda's Entebbe Airport; Yonatan Netanyahu and several Ugandan soldiers are killed in the raid.
- The United States Bicentennial is celebrated with fireworks, parades, and the arrival of the Tall Ships on the Eastern Seaboard.
- July 6 – The first class of women is inducted at the United States Naval Academy in Annapolis, Maryland.
- July 7
  - German left-wing women terrorists Monika Berberich, Gabriella Rollnick, Juliane Plambeck and Inge Viett escape from the Lehrter Straße maximum security prison in West Berlin.
  - David Steel becomes leader of the UK's Liberal Party in the aftermath of the scandal which forced out Jeremy Thorpe.
- July 10
  - Four mercenaries, three British and one American, are shot by firing squad in Angola, following the Luanda Trial.
  - Seveso disaster: An explosion at a chemical plant in Seveso, Italy, causes extensive pollution to a large area in the neighborhood of Milan, with many evacuations and a large number of people affected by the toxic cloud.
- July 12 – In the United States:
  - California State University, Fullerton massacre: seven people are shot and killed, and two others are wounded in a mass shooting on campus at California State University, Fullerton.
  - Price Club, as predecessor of Costco, a worldwide membership-registration-only retailer, is founded in California.
- July 15
  - Jimmy Carter is nominated for U.S. president at the Democratic National Convention in New York City.
  - Twenty-six Chowchilla schoolchildren and their bus driver are abducted and buried in a box truck within a quarry in Livermore, California. The captives dig themselves free after 16 hours. The quarry-owner's son and two accomplices are arrested for the crime.
- July 16–20 – Albert Spaggiari and his gang break into the vault of the Société Generale Bank in Nice, France.
- July 17
  - The 1976 Summer Olympics begin in Montreal, Quebec, Canada.
  - East Timor is declared the 27th province of Indonesia.
- July 18 – 14-year-old Romanian gymnast Nadia Comăneci earns the first of seven perfect scores of 10 at the 1976 Summer Olympics.
- July 19 – Sagarmatha National Park in Nepal is created.
- July 20
  - Viking program: The Viking 1 lander successfully lands on Mars.
  - American criminal Gary Gilmore is arrested for murdering two men in Utah.
- July 21 – A Provisional Irish Republican Army bomb kills Christopher Ewart-Biggs, new British ambassador to the Irish Republic, and Judith Cooke, a Northern Ireland Office private secretary, in Dublin; two others are seriously wounded but survive.
- July 26 – In Los Angeles, Ronald Reagan announces his choice of liberal U.S. Senator Richard Schweiker as his vice presidential running mate, in an effort to woo moderate Republican delegates away from President Gerald Ford.
- July 27
  - The United Kingdom breaks diplomatic relations with its former colony Uganda in response to the hijacking of Air France Flight 139.
  - Delegates attending an American Legion convention at The Bellevue-Stratford Hotel in Philadelphia, US, begin falling ill with a form of pneumonia: this will eventually be recognised as the first outbreak of Legionnaires' disease and will end in the deaths of 29 attendees.
- July 28 – The Tangshan earthquake flattens Tangshan, China, killing 242,769 people, and injuring 164,851.
- July 29 – In New York City, the "Son of Sam" pulls a gun from a paper bag, killing one and seriously wounding another, in the first of a series of attacks that terrorize the city for the next year.
- July 30
  - Bruce Jenner wins the gold medal in the men's decathlon at the 1976 Summer Olympics in Montreal.
  - In Santiago, Chile, Cruzeiro from Brazil beats River Plate from Argentina and are the Copa Libertadores de América champions in Association football.
- July 31
  - NASA releases the famous Face on Mars photo, taken by Viking 1.
  - The Big Thompson River in northern Colorado floods, destroying more than 400 cars and houses and killing 143 people.

=== August ===
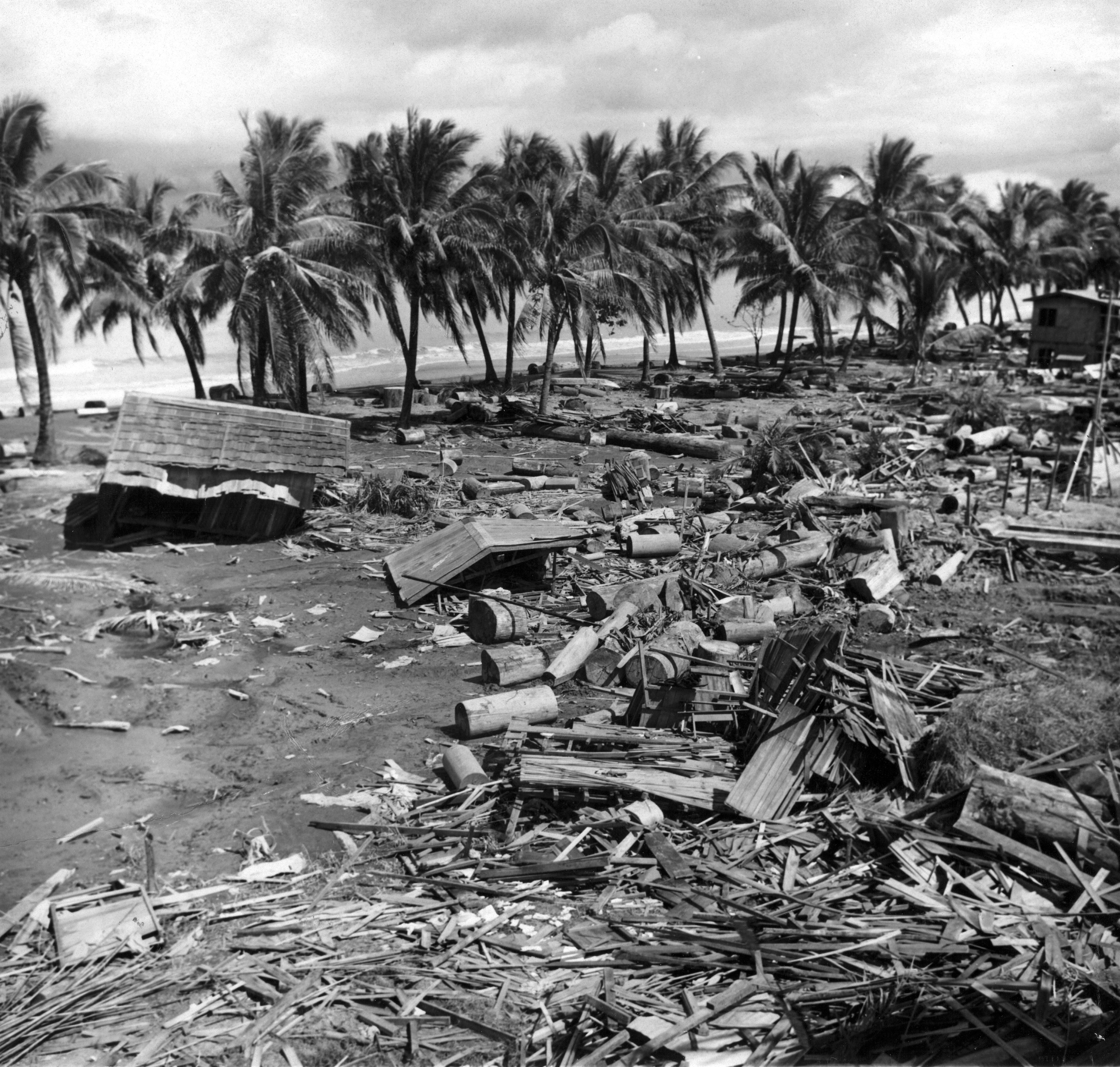
Tsunami damage at barangay Tibpuan, Lebak, Mindanao

- August 1
  - The 1976 Summer Olympics ends in Montreal, Quebec, Canada.
  - Trinidad and Tobago becomes a republic, replacing Elizabeth II as its head of state with President Ellis Clarke.
  - Defending F1 World Champion Niki Lauda suffers serious burns in the German Grand Prix after a huge accident that nearly cost him his life.
- August 2 – A gunman murders Andrea Wilborn and Stan Farr and injures Priscilla Davis and Gus Gavrel, in an incident at Priscilla's mansion in Fort Worth, Texas. T. Cullen Davis, Priscilla's husband and one of the richest men in Texas, is tried and found innocent for Andrea's murder, involvement in a plot to kill several people (including Priscilla and a judge), and a wrongful death lawsuit. Cullen goes broke afterwards.
- August 5 – The clock of "Big Ben" at the Palace of Westminster in London suffers internal damage and requires frequent repairs. The clock is stopped at times on 26 of the next 275 days.
- August 6 – Former United Kingdom Postmaster General John Stonehouse is sentenced to 7 years' jail for fraud, theft and forgery.
- August 7 – Viking program: Viking 2 enters into orbit around Mars.
- August 8 – As part of the American Basketball Association–National Basketball Association merger, a dispersal draft is conducted to assign teams for the players on the two ABA franchises which have folded.
- August 9 – The Selous Scouts of the Rhodesian Army conduct a cross-border raid into Nyadzonya, Mozambique in Operation Eland, an action that led to severe political and diplomatic consequences on Rhodesia.
- August 11 – A sniper rampage in Wichita, Kansas on a Holiday Inn results in 3 deaths while 7 others are wounded.
- August 14
  - Around 10,000 Protestant and Catholic women demonstrate for peace in Northern Ireland.
  - The Senegalese political party PAI-Rénovation is legally recognized, becoming the third legal party in the country.
- August 17 – The 8.0 M_{w} Moro Gulf earthquake hits off the coast of Mindanao, Philippines, triggering a destructive tsunami, killing between 5,000 and 8,000 people and leaving more than 90,000 homeless.
- August 18 – At Panmunjom, North Korea, two United States soldiers are killed while trying to chop down part of a tree in the Korean Demilitarized Zone which has obscured their view.
- August 19 – U.S. President Gerald Ford edges out challenger Ronald Reagan to win the Republican Party presidential nomination in Kansas City.
- August 24 – In Uruguay, the army captures Marcelo Gelman and his pregnant wife. Gelman is later killed and his wife disappears.
- August 25
  - Jacques Chirac resigns as Prime Minister of France; he is succeeded by Raymond Barre.
  - Landslide disaster in Sau Mau Ping, Hong Kong.
- August 26
  - The second known outbreak of Ebola virus occurs in Yambuku, Zaire.
  - Prince Bernhard of Lippe-Biesterfeld, husband of Queen Juliana of the Netherlands, resigns from various posts over a scandal involving alleged corruption in connection with business dealings with the Lockheed Corporation.
- August 29 – The first Women in Print Conference is held in Omaha, Nebraska. Over 130 women from 80 feminist organizations and collectives attend the gathering, which was associated with the women in print movement.
- August 30 – James Alexander George Smith McCartney is sworn in as the first chief minister of the Turks and Caicos Islands.

=== September ===
- September 1
  - Cigarette and tobacco advertising is banned on Australian television and radio.
  - Aparicio Méndez, a jurist, is inaugurated as a civilian de facto President of Uruguay in the framework of a dictatorship.
  - The state of emergency in the Republic of Ireland legally still in force since 1939 is lifted.
- September 3
  - Viking program: The Viking 2 spacecraft lands at Utopia Planitia on Mars, taking the first close-up color photographs of the planet's surface.
  - A Lockheed C-130 Hercules of the Venezuelan Air Force crashed near Lajes Field, Azores Islands, Portugal, killing all 68 occupants on board.
- September 6
  - Cold War: Soviet Air Force pilot Lt. Viktor Belenko lands a MiG-25 jet fighter at Hakodate, on the island of Hokkaidō in Japan, and requests political asylum in the United States.
  - Frank Sinatra brings Jerry Lewis's former partner Dean Martin onstage, unannounced, at the 1976 Jerry Lewis MDA Telethon in Las Vegas, reuniting the comedy team for the first (and only) time in over 20 years.
- September 9 – Chairman of the Chinese Communist Party Mao Zedong dies in Beijing after a series of heart attacks.
- September 10 – Zagreb mid-air collision: A British Airways Trident and a Yugoslav DC-9 collide near Zagreb, Yugoslavia (modern-day Zagreb, Croatia), killing all 176 aboard.
- September 15 – Darryl Sittler scores the winning goal in the 1976 Canada Cup for Canada to win over Czechoslovakia in overtime, to win the first Canada Cup in ice hockey.
- September 16
  - Shavarsh Karapetyan saves 20 people from a trolleybus that had fallen into a Yerevan reservoir.
  - Beginning with the Night of the Pencils, a series of kidnappings and forced disappearances followed by torture, rape, and murder of students under the Argentine dictatorship takes place.
- September 17 – The space shuttle Enterprise is rolled out of a hangar in Palmdale, California, United States.
- September 21
  - The Seychelles join the United Nations.
  - Orlando Letelier is assassinated in Washington, D.C. by Michael Townley, an agent linked with the National Intelligence Directorate of Chile.
- September 24 – Patty Hearst is sentenced to seven years in prison for her role in the armed robbery of a San Francisco bank in 1974 (an executive clemency order from U.S. President Jimmy Carter will set her free after only 22 months).

=== October ===
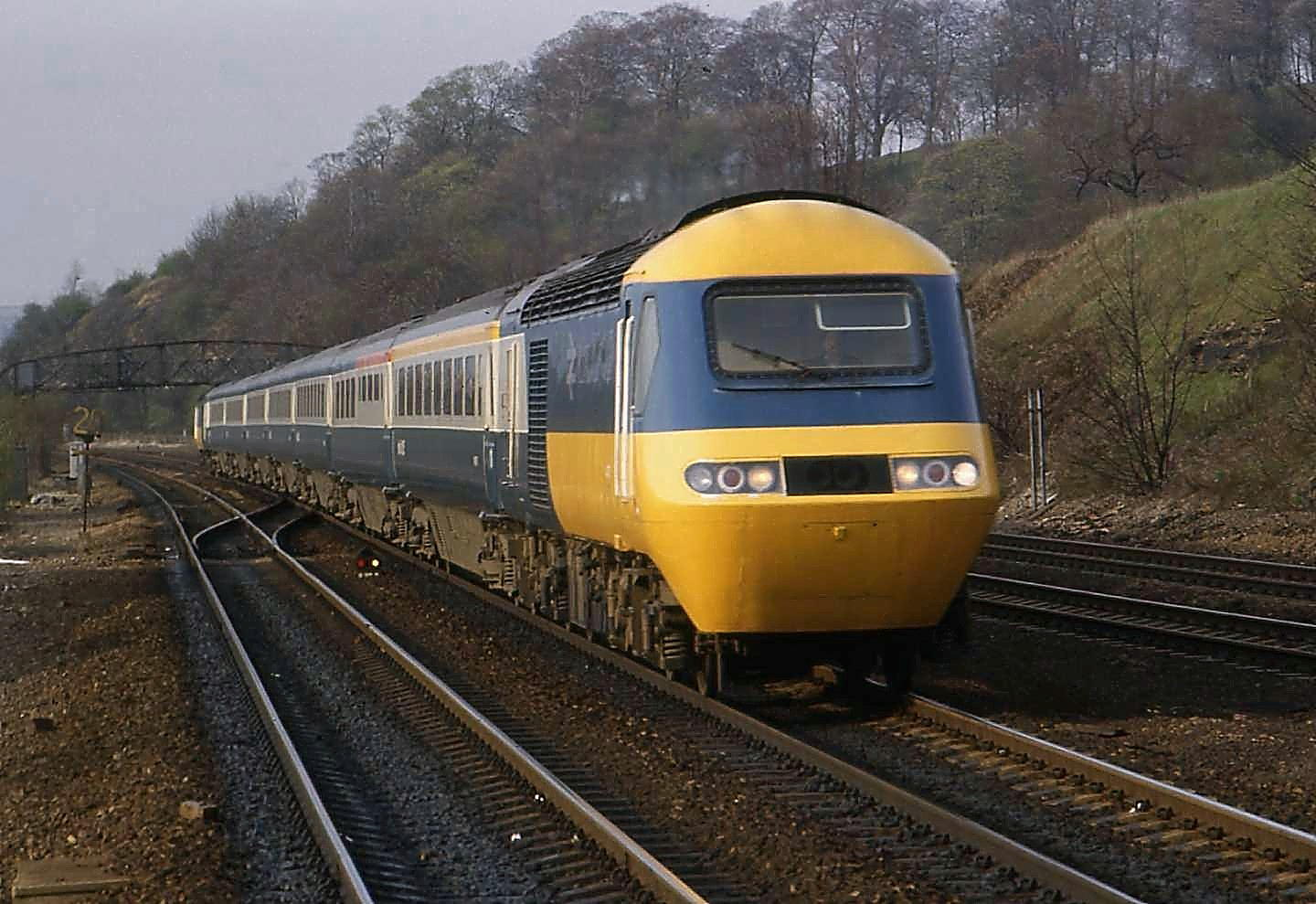
October 4: The InterCity 125 high-speed train is introduced in the UK; services begin two days later.

- October 4 – The InterCity 125 high-speed train is introduced in the United Kingdom.
- October 6
  - Cubana de Aviación Flight 455 crashes due to a bomb placed by anti-Fidel Castro terrorists, after taking off from Bridgetown, Barbados; all 73 people on board are killed.
  - Students gathering at Thammasat University in Bangkok, Thailand are massacred, while protesting the return of ex-dictator Thanom Kittikachorn by a coalition of right-wing paramilitary and government forces, triggering the return of the military to government.
  - In San Francisco, during his second televised debate with Jimmy Carter, U.S. President Gerald Ford incorrectly declares that "there is no Soviet domination of Eastern Europe" (there is at the time).
  - The Cultural Revolution in China concludes upon the capture of the Gang of Four.
- October 8 – Thorbjörn Fälldin replaces Olof Palme as Prime Minister of Sweden.
- October 10 – Taiwan Governor Hsieh Tung-min is injured by a letter bomb from a pro-independence activist.
- October 12 – The People's Republic of China announces that Hua Guofeng is the successor to Mao Zedong as Chairman of the Chinese Communist Party following the latter's death on September 9 from a heart attack.
- October 13 – The United States Commission on Civil Rights releases the report, Puerto Ricans in the Continental United States: An Uncertain Future, that documents that Puerto Ricans in the United States have a poverty rate of 33 percent in 1974 (up from 29 percent in 1970), the highest of all major racial-ethnic groups in the country (not including Puerto Rico, a U.S. territory).
- October 19
  - The Battle of Aishiya is fought in Lebanon.
  - The Copyright Act of 1976 extends copyright duration for an additional 19 years in the United States.
  - The Chimpanzee (Pan troglodytes) is placed on the list of endangered species.
- October 20 – The Mississippi River ferry MV George Prince is struck by a ship while crossing from Destrehan, Louisiana to Luling, Louisiana, killing 78 passengers and crew.
- October 22 – Cearbhall Ó Dálaigh, the 5th President of Ireland, resigns after being publicly insulted by the Minister for Defense.
- October 26 – Transkei gains "independence" from South Africa.

=== November ===
- November 2 – 1976 United States presidential election: Jimmy Carter narrowly defeats incumbent Gerald Ford, becoming the first candidate from the Deep South to win since the Civil War.
- November 3 – Carrie, an American supernatural horror film directed by Brian De Palma, is premiered in 17 theaters in the Washington, D.C.-Baltimore area.
- November 6 - Uttawar forced sterilisations: Mass vasectomy of nearly 800 men of Uttawar village, Palwal district, Haryana during India's Emergency imposed by Indira Gandhi.
- November 12 – Disappearance of Renee MacRae and her 3-year-old son Andrew from Inverness in Scotland; this becomes Britain's longest-running missing persons case.
- November 15 – The first megamouth shark is discovered off Oʻahu in Hawaiʻi.
- November 19 – Jaime Ornelas Camacho takes office as the first President of the Regional Government of Madeira, Portugal.
- November 24 – 1976 Çaldıran–Muradiye earthquake: Between 4,000 and 5,000 are killed in a 7.3 M_{s} earthquake at Van and Muradiye in eastern Turkey.
- November 26
  - Microsoft is officially registered with the Office of the Secretary of the State of New Mexico.
  - The Warsaw Treaty Organization joint secretariat is established.

=== December ===
- December 1
  - Angola joins the United Nations.
  - José López Portillo takes office as President of Mexico.
  - Sir Douglas Nicholls is appointed the 28th Governor of South Australia, the first Australian Aboriginal appointed to vice-regal office.
- December 3 – Patrick Hillery is sworn in after being elected unopposed as the 6th President of Ireland.
- December 5 – The Japanese general election takes place, and the ruling Liberal Democratic Party loses its majority in the 511-member House of Representatives but remains the largest party with 249 seats.
- December 8 – The Congressional Hispanic Caucus is established by the five Latinos in the United States Congress: Herman Badillo of the Bronx, E. de la Garza and Henry B. Gonzalez of Texas, Edward R. Roybal of California, and the nonvoting Resident Commissioner of Puerto Rico, Baltasar Corrada del Río.
- December 10 – The United Nations General Assembly adopts the Convention on the Prohibition of Military or Any Other Hostile Use of Environmental Modification Techniques.
- December 15
  - Samoa joins the United Nations.
  - Denis Healey announces to the British Parliament that he has successfully negotiated a £2.3bn loan from the International Monetary Fund.
- December 23 – A new volcano, Murara, erupts in eastern Zaire.

=== Date unknown ===
- Random breath testing is introduced in Victoria (Australia).
- The first laser printer is introduced by IBM (the IBM 3800).
- The New Jersey Legislature passes legislation legalizing casinos in the shore town of Atlantic City commencing in 1978. After signing the bill into law, Governor Brendan Byrne declares "The mob is not welcome in New Jersey!" referring to the Mafia's influence at casinos in Nevada.
- Marc Brown's Arthur's Nose is published.

== Births ==
=== January ===
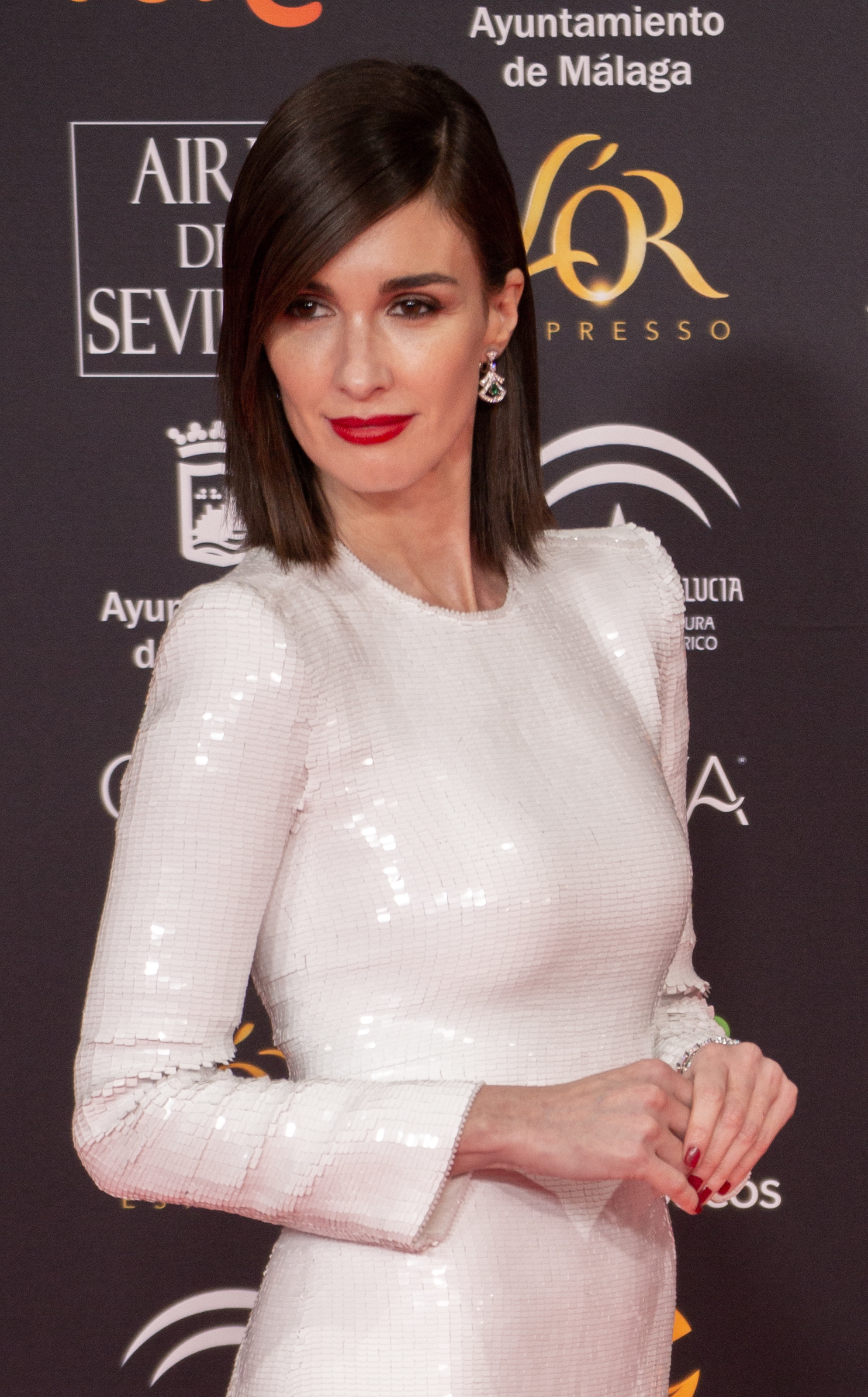
Paz Vega

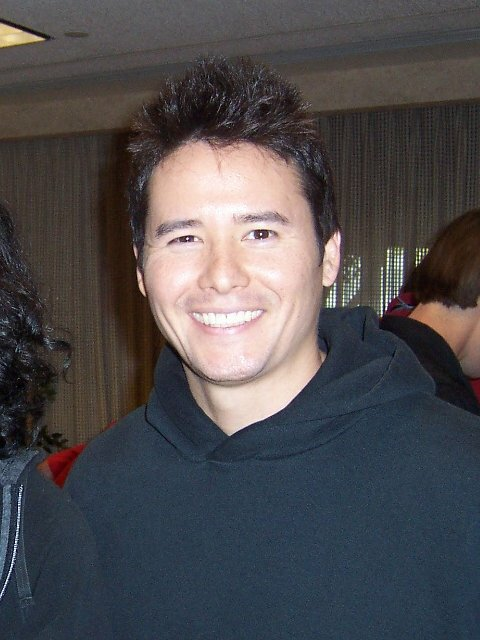
Johnny Yong Bosch

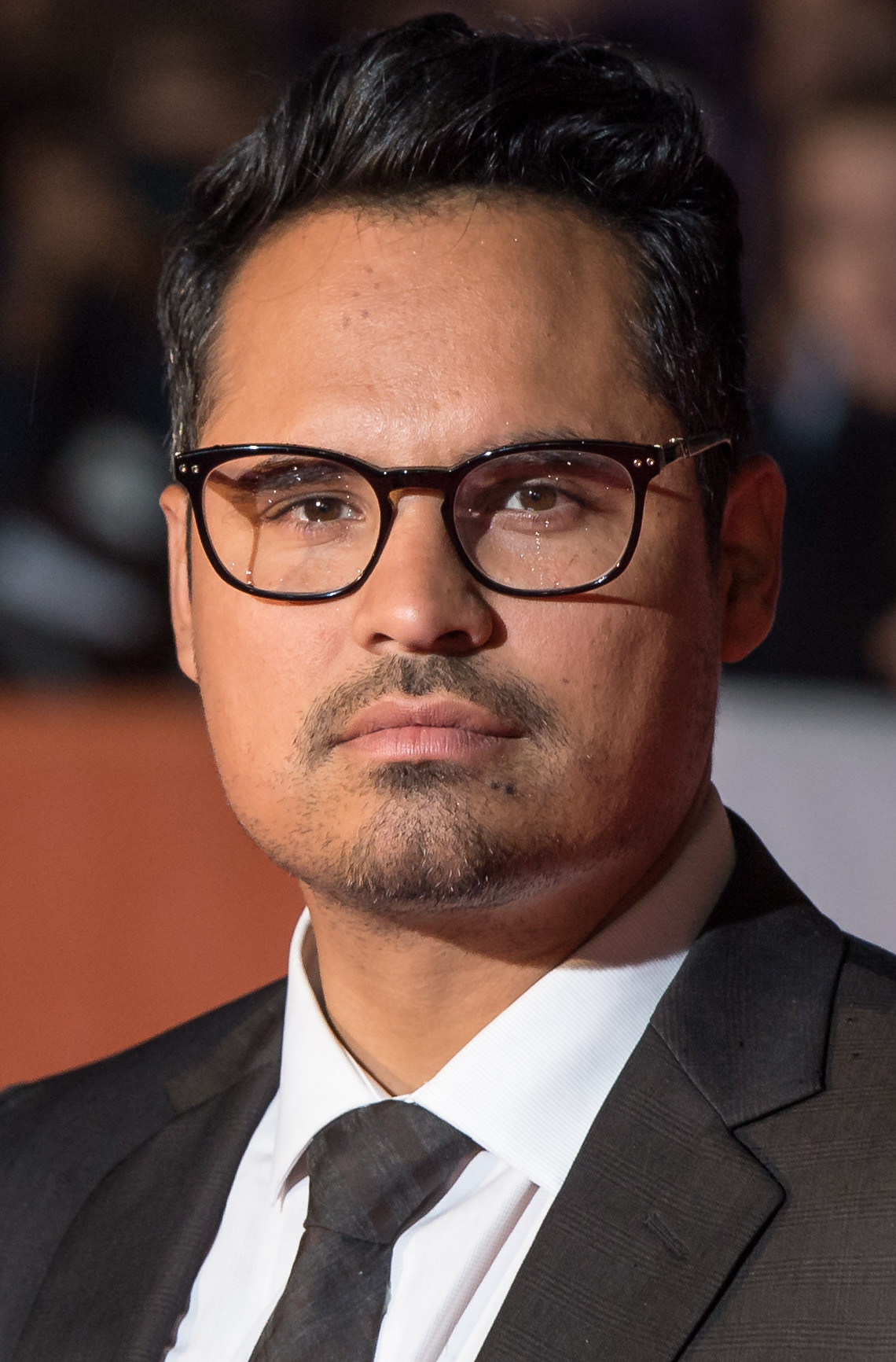
Michael Peña

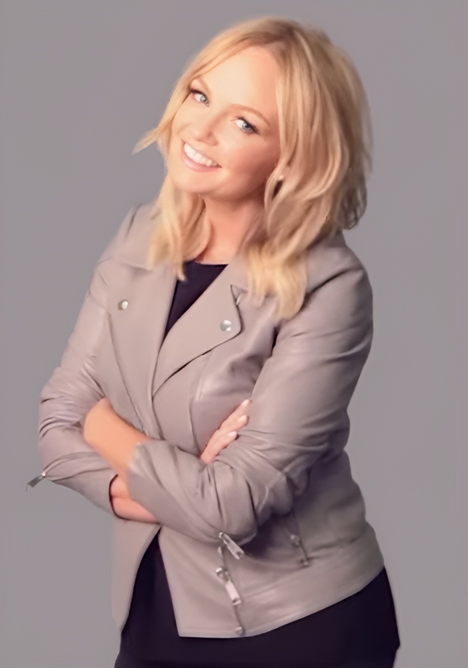
Emma Bunton

- January 2 – Paz Vega, Spanish actress
- January 3 – Angelos Basinas, Greek footballer
- January 4 – August Diehl, German actor
- January 6
  - Johnny Yong Bosch, American actor
  - Agnieszka Stelmaszyk, Polish writer
- January 8 – Jenny Lewis, American musician and actress
- January 13
  - Michael Peña, American actor
  - Mario Yepes, Colombian football player
- January 15 – Dorian Missick, American actor
- January 16 – Martina Moravcová, Slovak swimmer
- January 21 – Emma Bunton, English musician
- January 23
  - Anne Margrethe Hausken, Norwegian orienteer
  - Angelica Lee, Taiwanese actress and singer
- January 27 – Ahn Jung-hwan, South Korean footballer and television personality
- January 28 – Rick Ross, American rapper
- January 31 – Paul Scheer, American comedian and actor

=== February ===
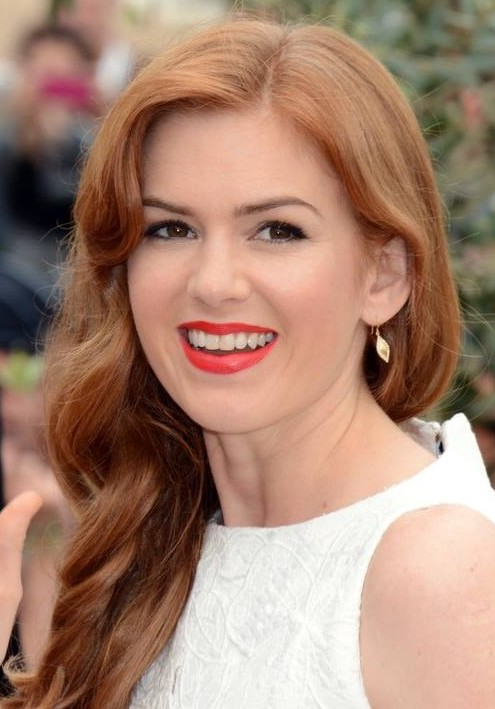
Isla Fisher

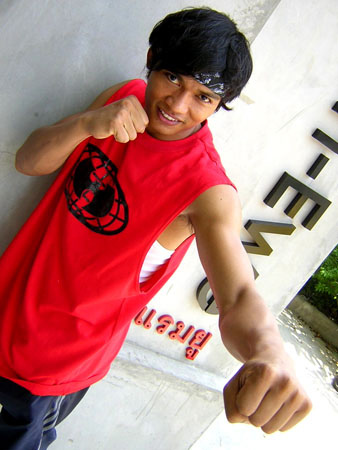
Tony Jaa

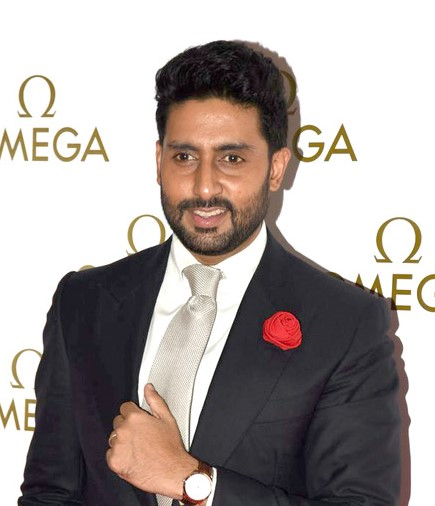
Abhishek Bachchan

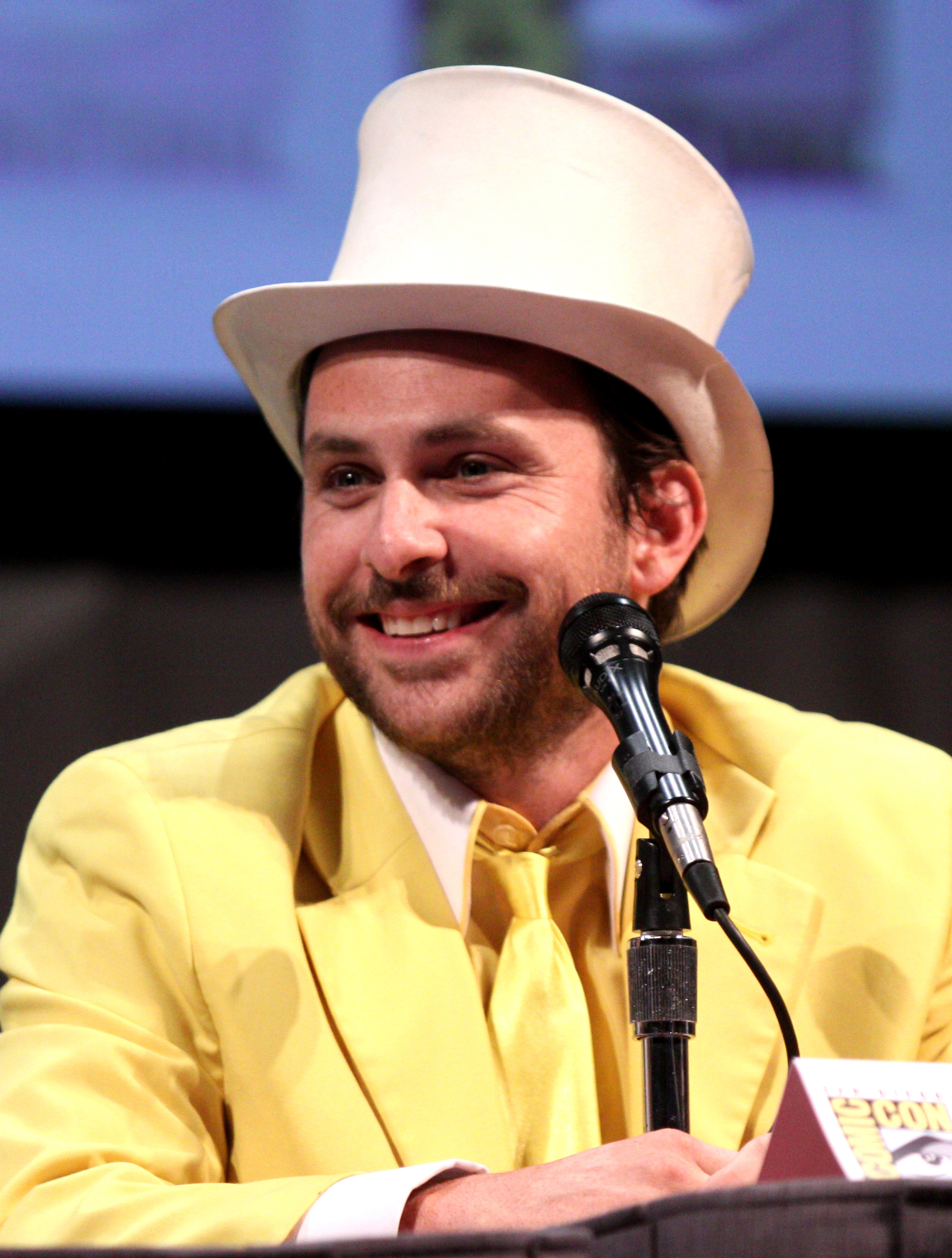
Charlie Day

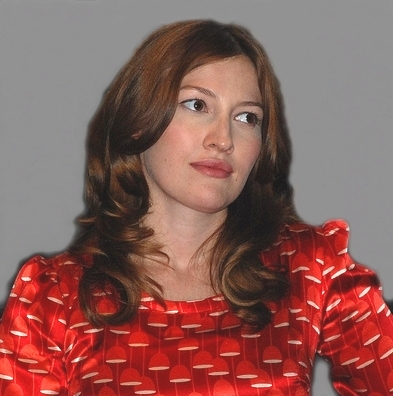
Kelly Macdonald

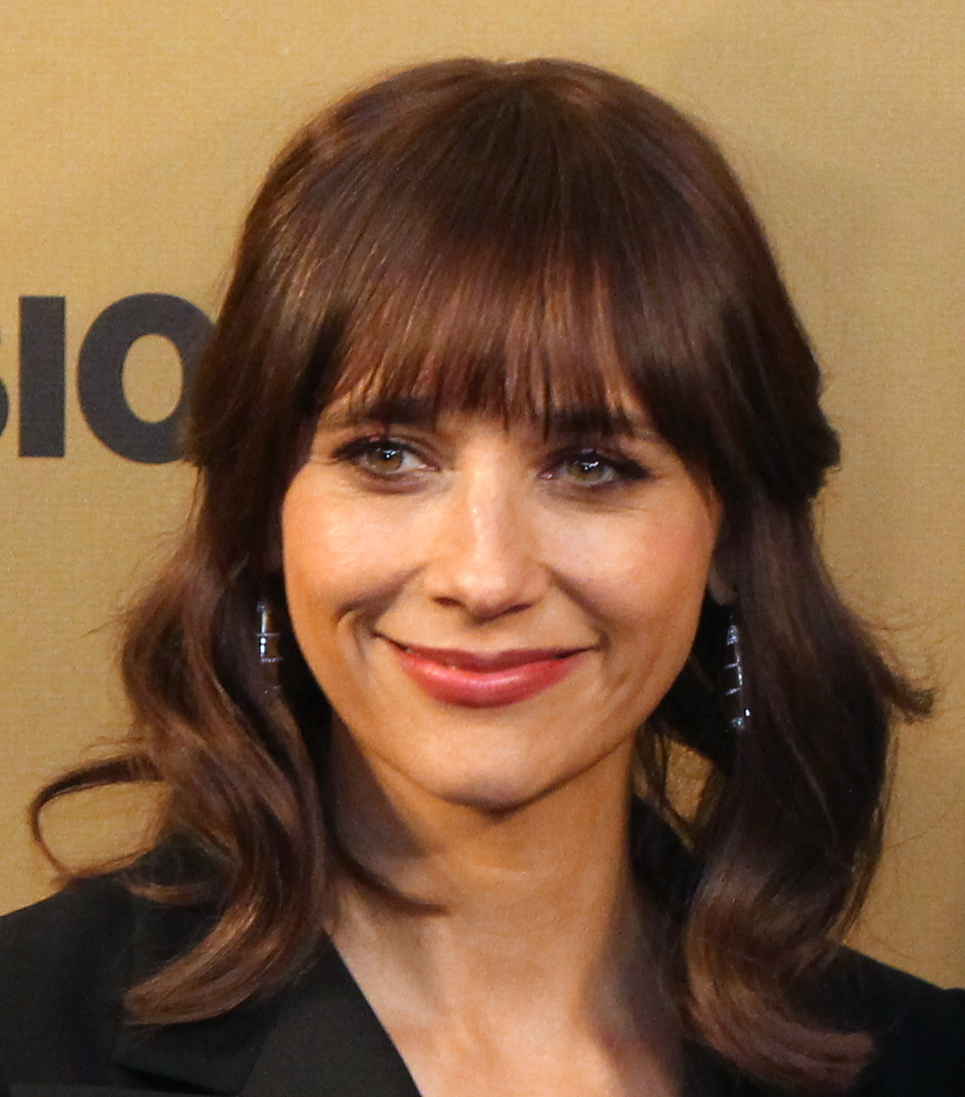
Rashida Jones

- February 1
  - Katrín Jakobsdóttir, Icelandic politician, 28th Prime Minister of Iceland
  - Muteba Kidiaba, Congolese football goalkeeper
  - Mat Rogers, Australian rugby league and rugby union player
- February 2
  - Carlos Coste, Venezuelan free-diver
  - James Hickman, British swimmer
- February 3
  - Isla Fisher, Australian actress
  - Tim Heidecker, American comedian
  - Tijana, Macedonian singer
- February 4 – Cam'ron, African-American rapper
- February 5
  - Abhishek Bachchan, Indian actor
  - Tony Jaa, Thai martial art film actor/choreographer/director
  - Brian Moorman, American football player
- February 6 – Kim Zmeskal, American gymnast
- February 9 – Charlie Day, American actor
- February 10 – Lance Berkman, American baseball player
- February 11 – Brice Beckham, American actor
- February 12 – Silvia Saint, Czech actress
  - Christian Cullen, New Zealand rugby union player
- February 14 – Erica Leerhsen, American actress
- February 15 – Brandon Boyd, American singer-songwriter and author
- February 16
  - Kyo, Japanese rock musician (Dir En Grey)
  - Adam Simpson, Australian rules footballer
  - Janet Varney, American actress and comedian
- February 17 – Svein Berge, Norwegian musician (Röyksopp)
- February 18 – Chanda Rubin, American tennis player
- February 20
  - Johanna Beisteiner, Austrian guitarist
  - Chris Cillizza, American journalist
- February 21 – Michael McIntyre, British stand-up comedian
- February 23
  - Aaron Aziz, Singaporean-born Malaysian actor
  - Kelly Macdonald, Scottish actress
- February 24 – Zach Johnson, American golfer
- February 25 – Rashida Jones, American actress, writer, model and musician
- February 27
  - Yukari Tamura, Japanese voice actress
  - Sergei Semak, Russian football player and coach
- February 28
  - Ali Larter, American actress and model
  - Guillaume Lemay-Thivierge, Canadian actor
- February 29
  - Ja Rule, American rapper
  - Mark Pollock, blind Irish adventurer and author

=== March ===
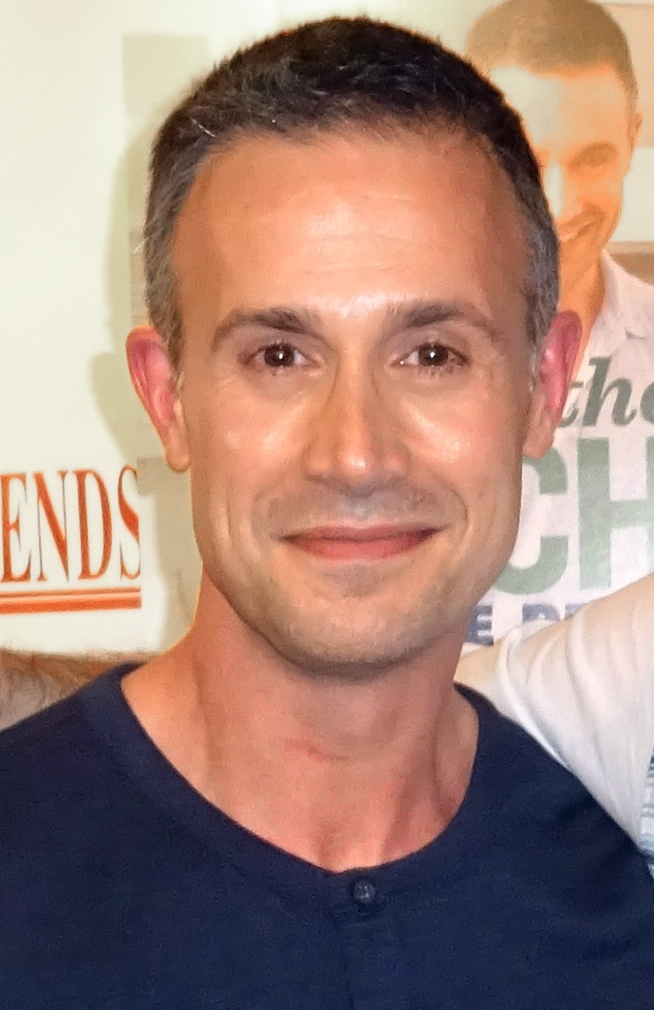
Freddie Prinze Jr.

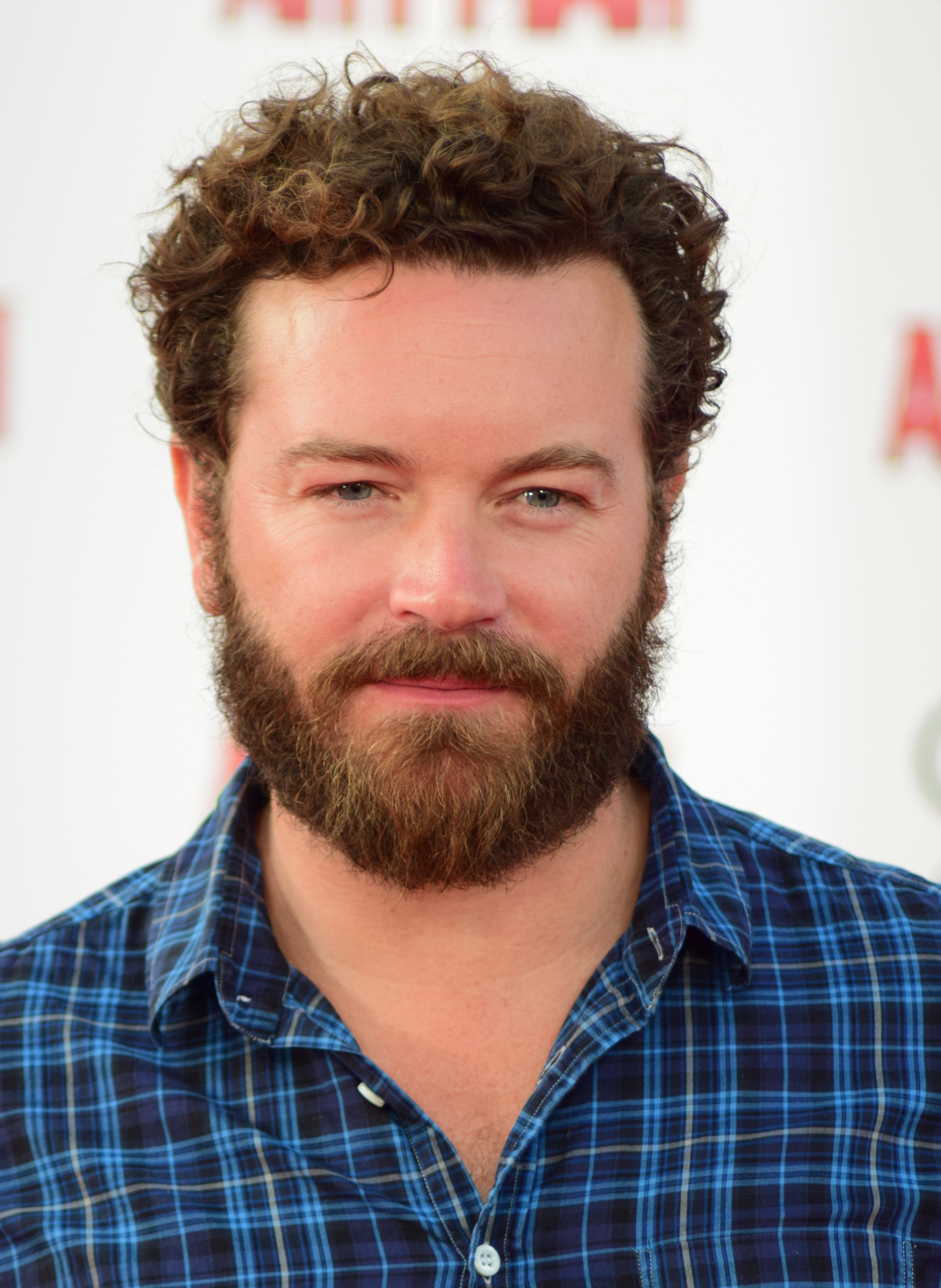
Danny Masterson

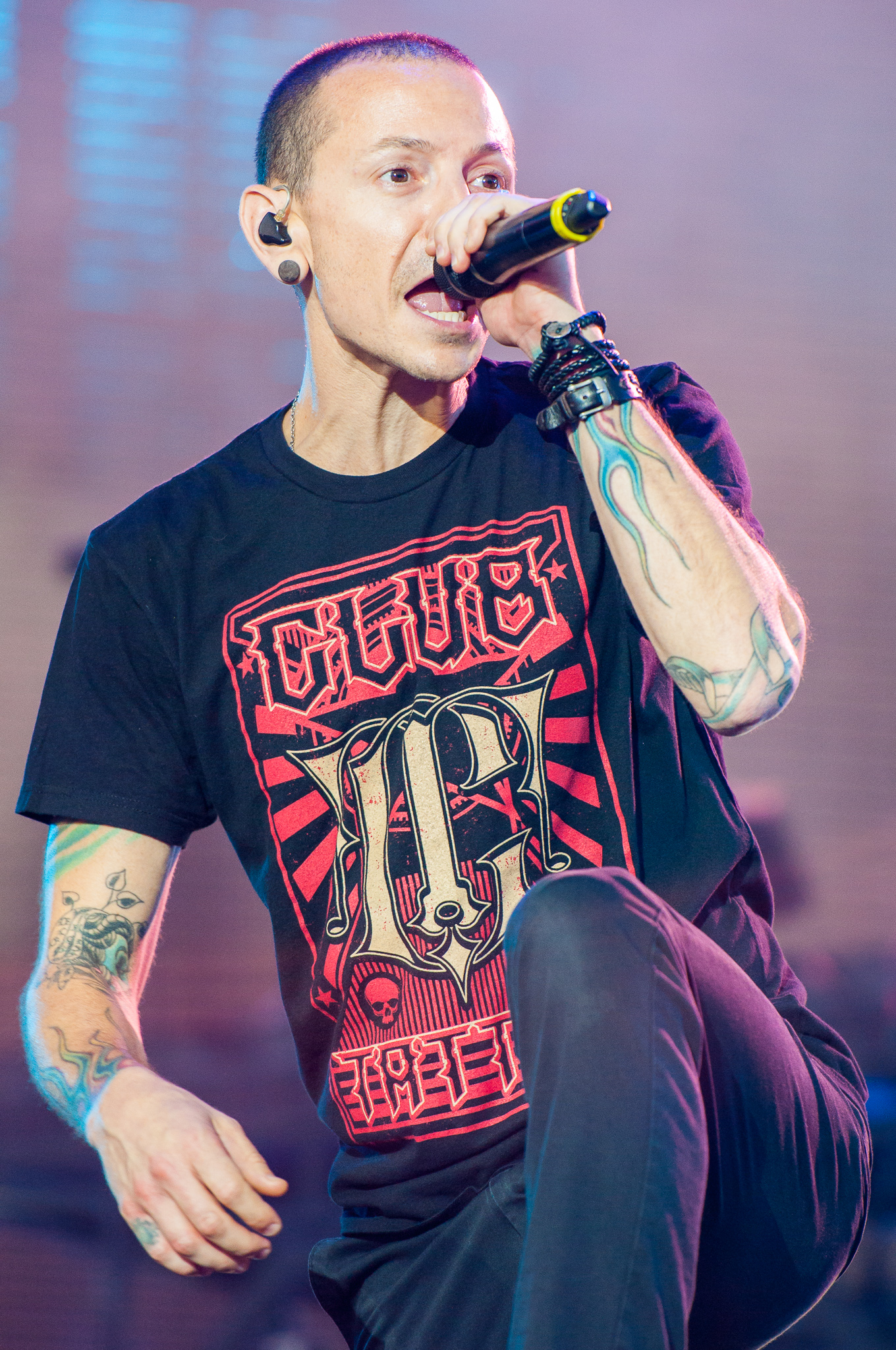
Chester Bennington

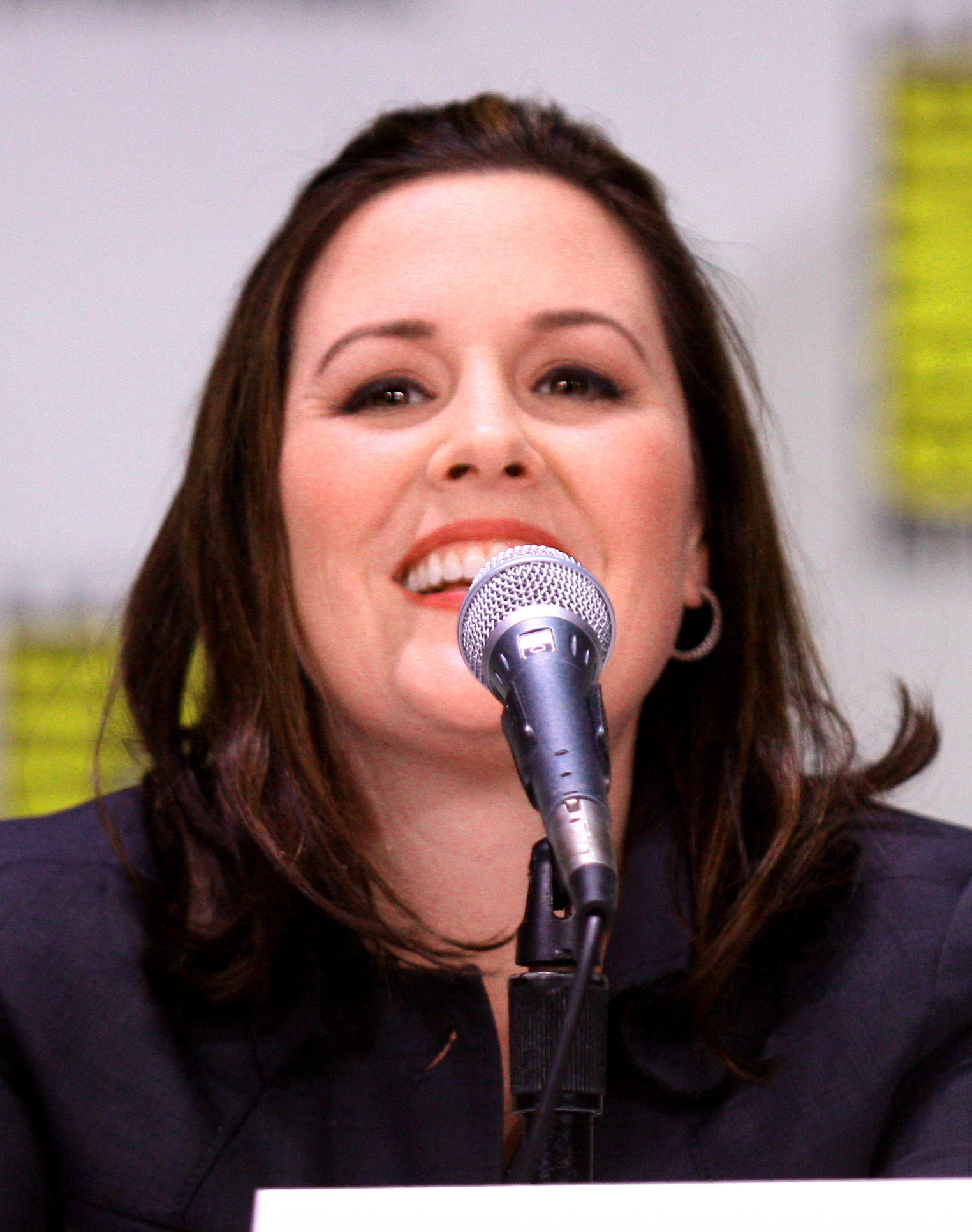
Rachael MacFarlane

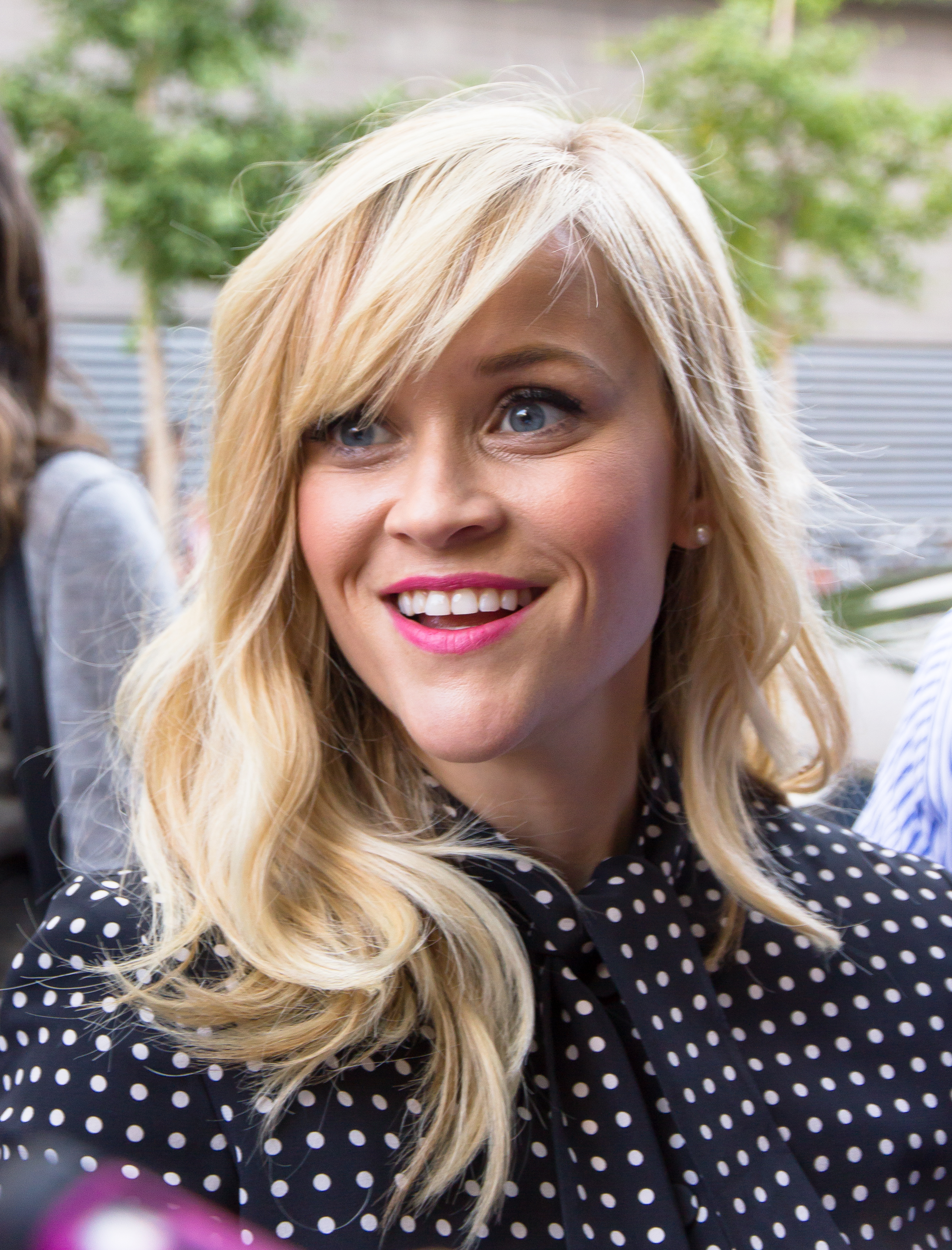
Reese Witherspoon

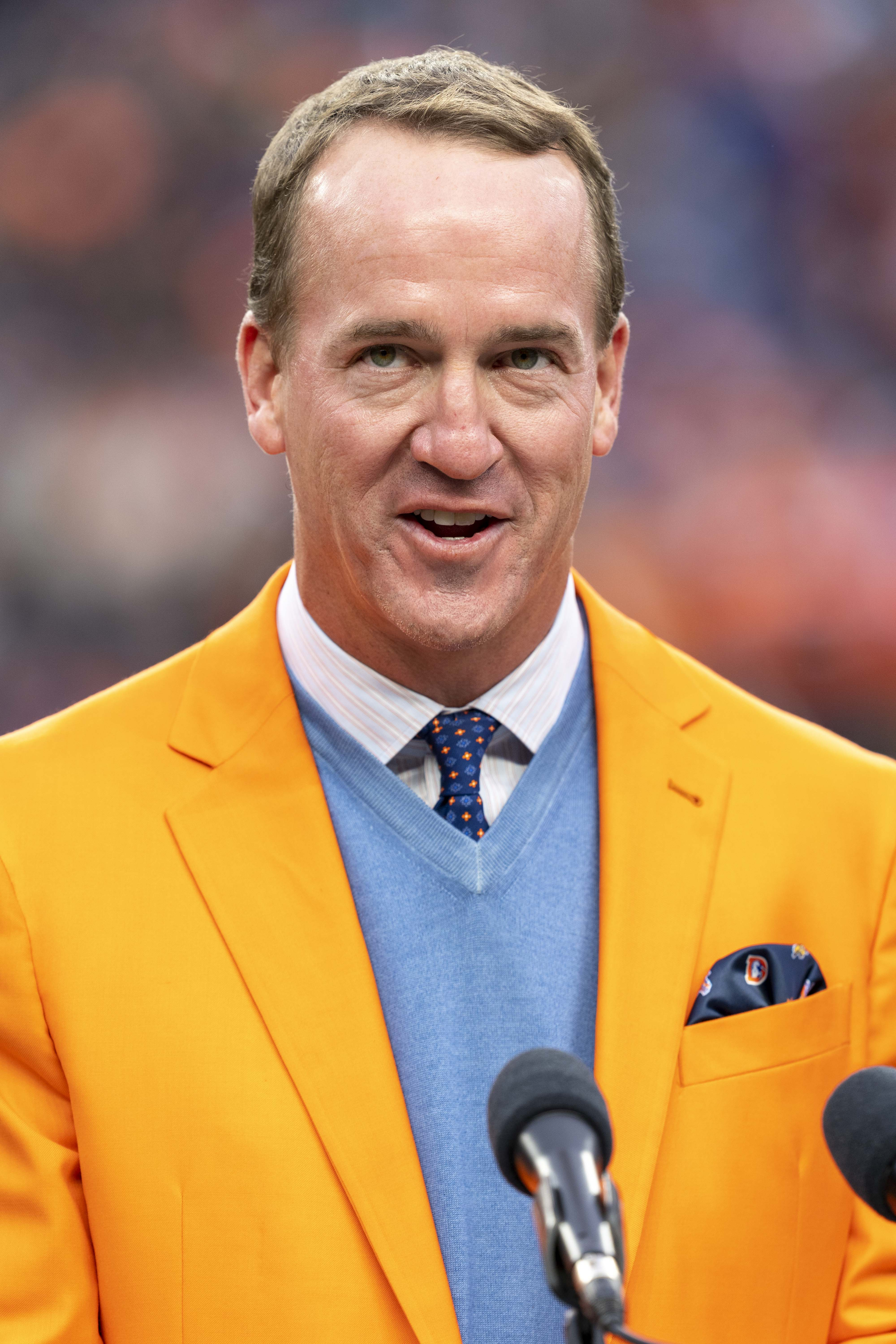
Peyton Manning

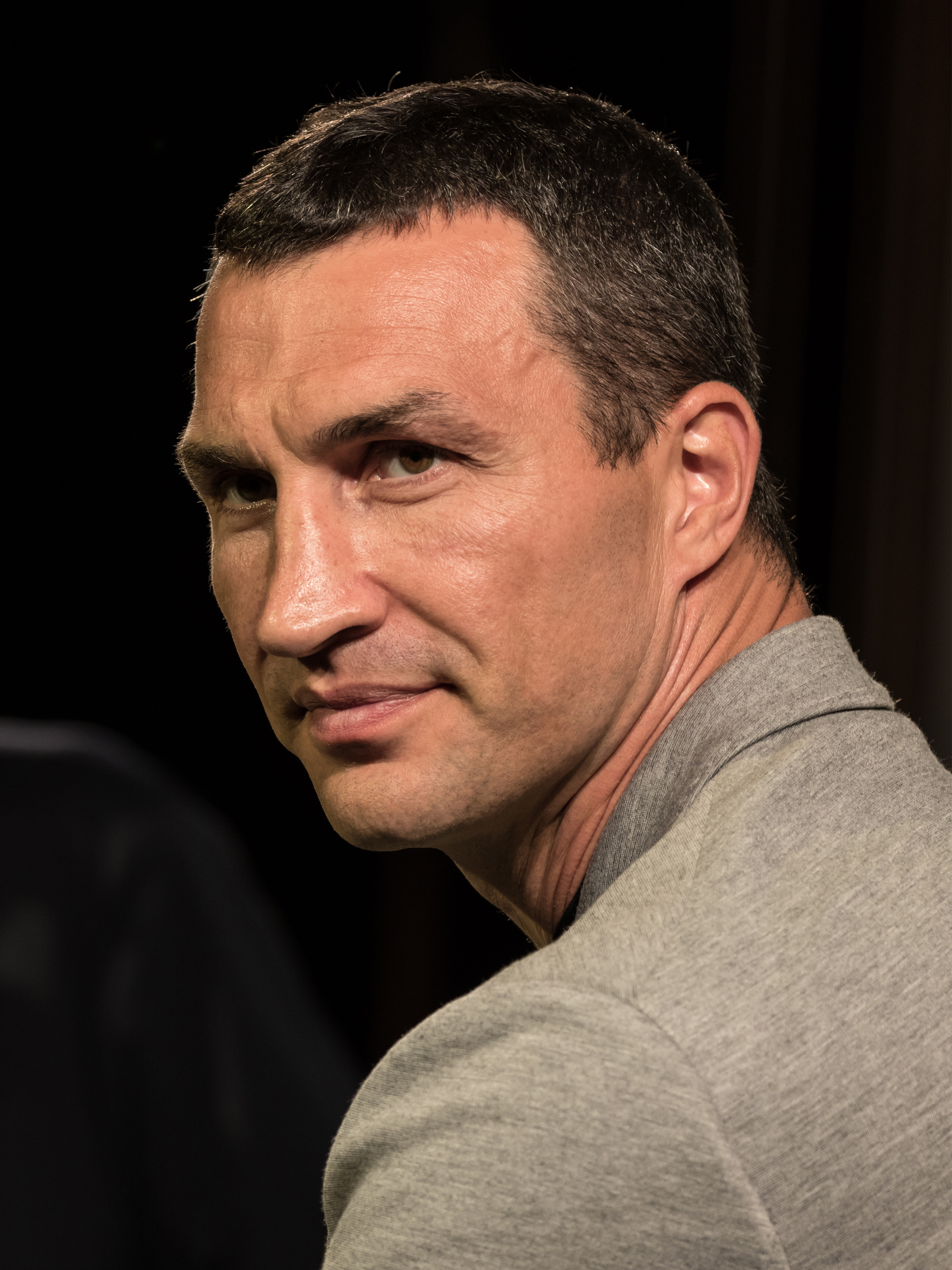
Wladimir Klitschko

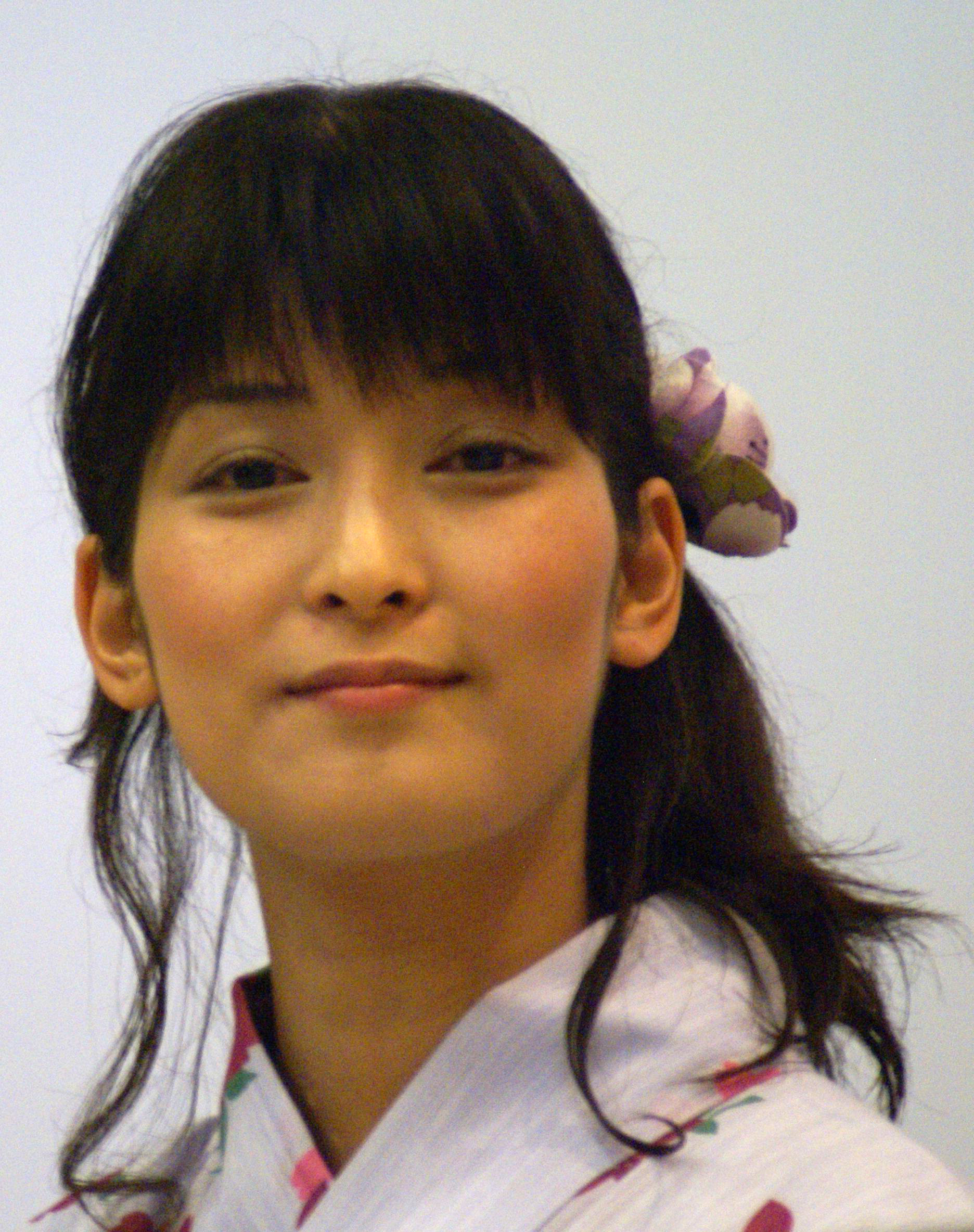
Ayako Kawasumi

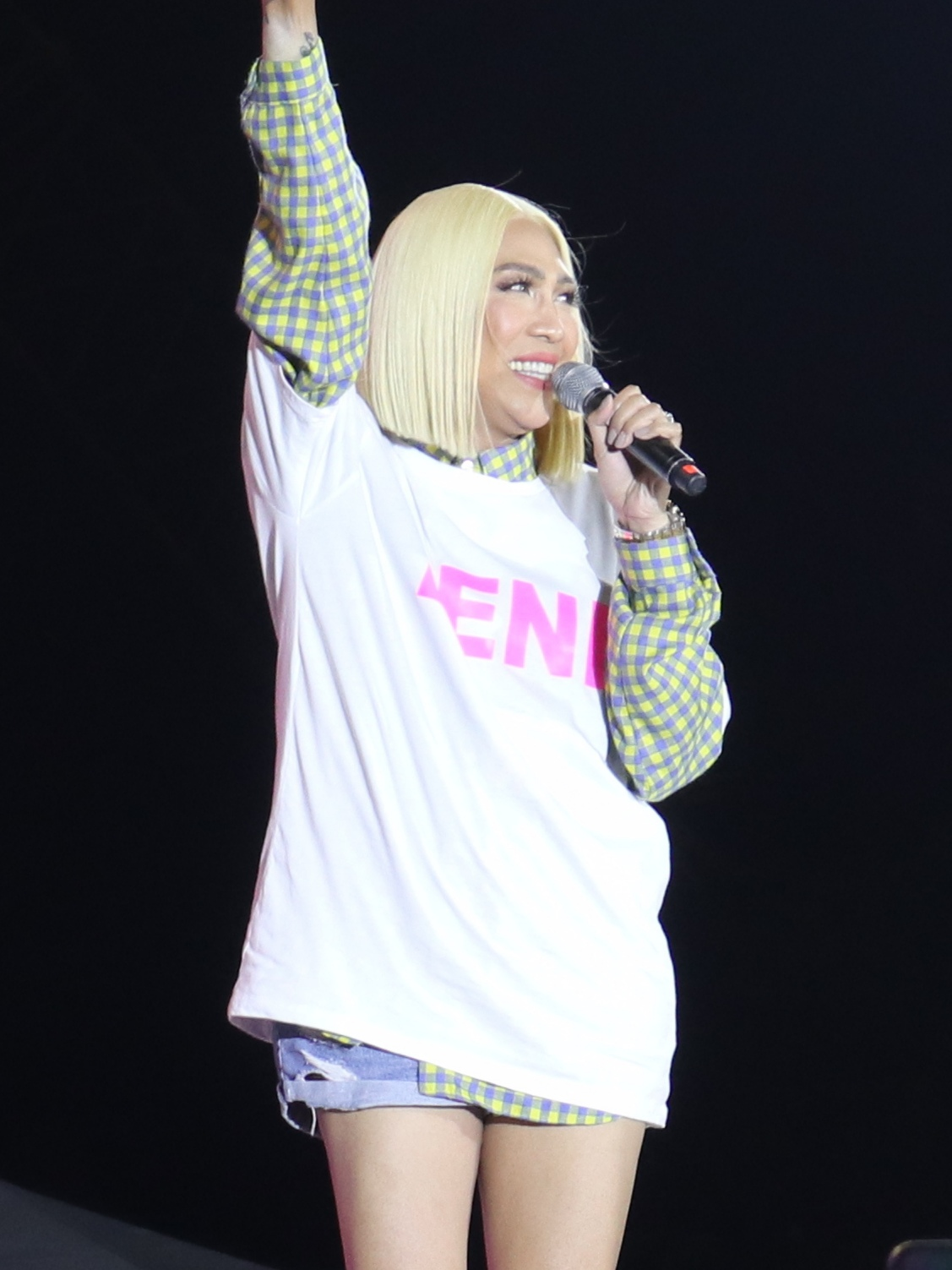
Vice Ganda

- March 3
  - Fraser Gehrig, Australian rules footballer
  - Isabel Granada, Filipino actress and singer (d. 2017)
- March 5 – Šarūnas Jasikevičius, Lithuanian basketball player
- March 6 – Ken Anderson, American professional wrestler (Mr. Anderson)
- March 8
  - Sergej Ćetković, Montenegrin singer
  - Gaz Coombes, English musician and singer-songwriter (Supergrass)
  - Freddie Prinze Jr., American actor
- March 9 – Yamila Diaz-Rahi, Argentinean model
- March 10 – Miroslav Kostadinov, Bulgarian singer and songwriter
- March 12 – Zhao Wei, Chinese singer and actress
- March 13 – Danny Masterson, American actor
- March 14 – Merlin Santana, American actor (d. 2002)
  - Phil Vickery, English rugby union player
- March 16
  - Blu Cantrell, American R&B singer
  - Pál Dárdai, Hungarian football player and manager
  - Kim Johnsson, Swedish hockey player
  - Zhu Chen, Chinese chess grandmaster
- March 17
  - Stephen Gately, Irish singer (Boyzone) (d. 2009)
  - Álvaro Recoba, Uruguayan footballer
- March 18
  - Emma Willis, English television presenter and former model
  - FanFan, American-born Taiwanese singer-songwriter
  - Eric Sorensen, American meteorologist and politician
- March 19
  - Rachel Blanchard, Canadian actress
  - Andre Miller, American basketball player
  - Alessandro Nesta, Italian football player
- March 20 – Chester Bennington, American singer (Linkin Park) (d. 2017)
- March 21 – Rachael MacFarlane, American actress and singer, sister of Seth MacFarlane
- March 22
  - Anna Iberszer, Polish actress, dancer, and choreographer
  - Teun de Nooijer, Dutch field hockey player
  - Shawty Lo, American rapper (d. 2016)
  - Kellie Shanygne Williams, American actress
  - Reese Witherspoon, American actress
- March 23
  - Sir Chris Hoy, Scottish cyclist
  - Keri Russell, American actress
  - Sa Beining, Chinese host
- March 24
  - Aaron Brooks, American football player
  - Peyton Manning, American football player
- March 26 – Amy Smart, American actress
- March 27
  - Brandon Johnson, American politician, mayor-elect of Chicago
  - Liu Limin, Chinese swimmer
- March 29 – Jennifer Capriati, American tennis player
- March 30
  - Jessica Cauffiel, American actress and singer
  - Ty Conklin, American ice-hockey player
  - Ayako Kawasumi, Japanese voice actress

=== April ===
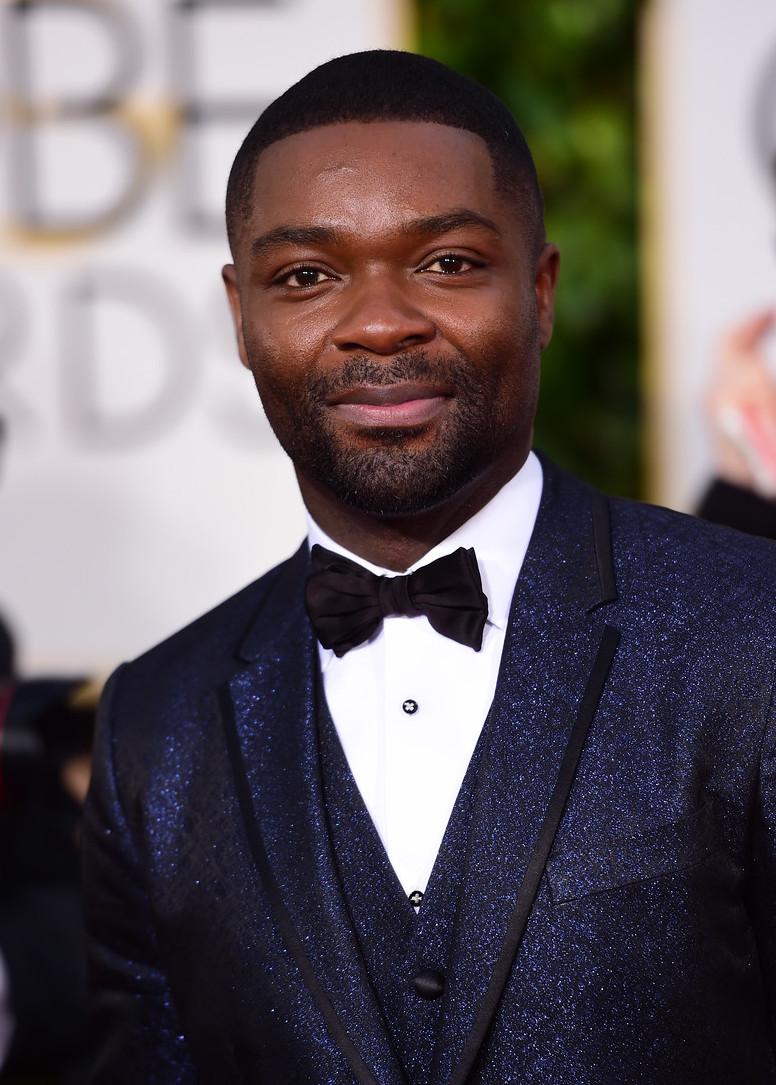
David Oyelowo

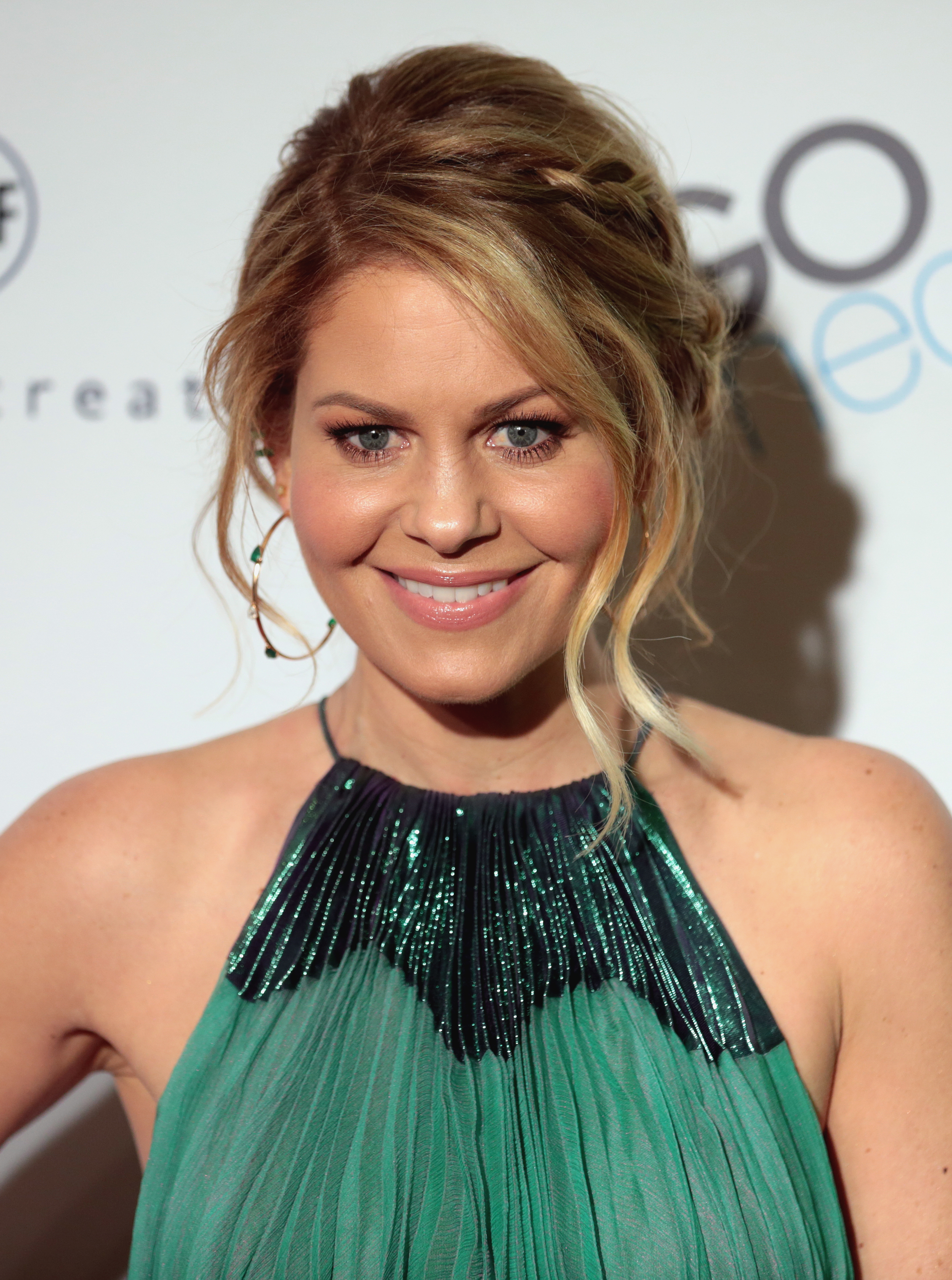
Candace Cameron Bure

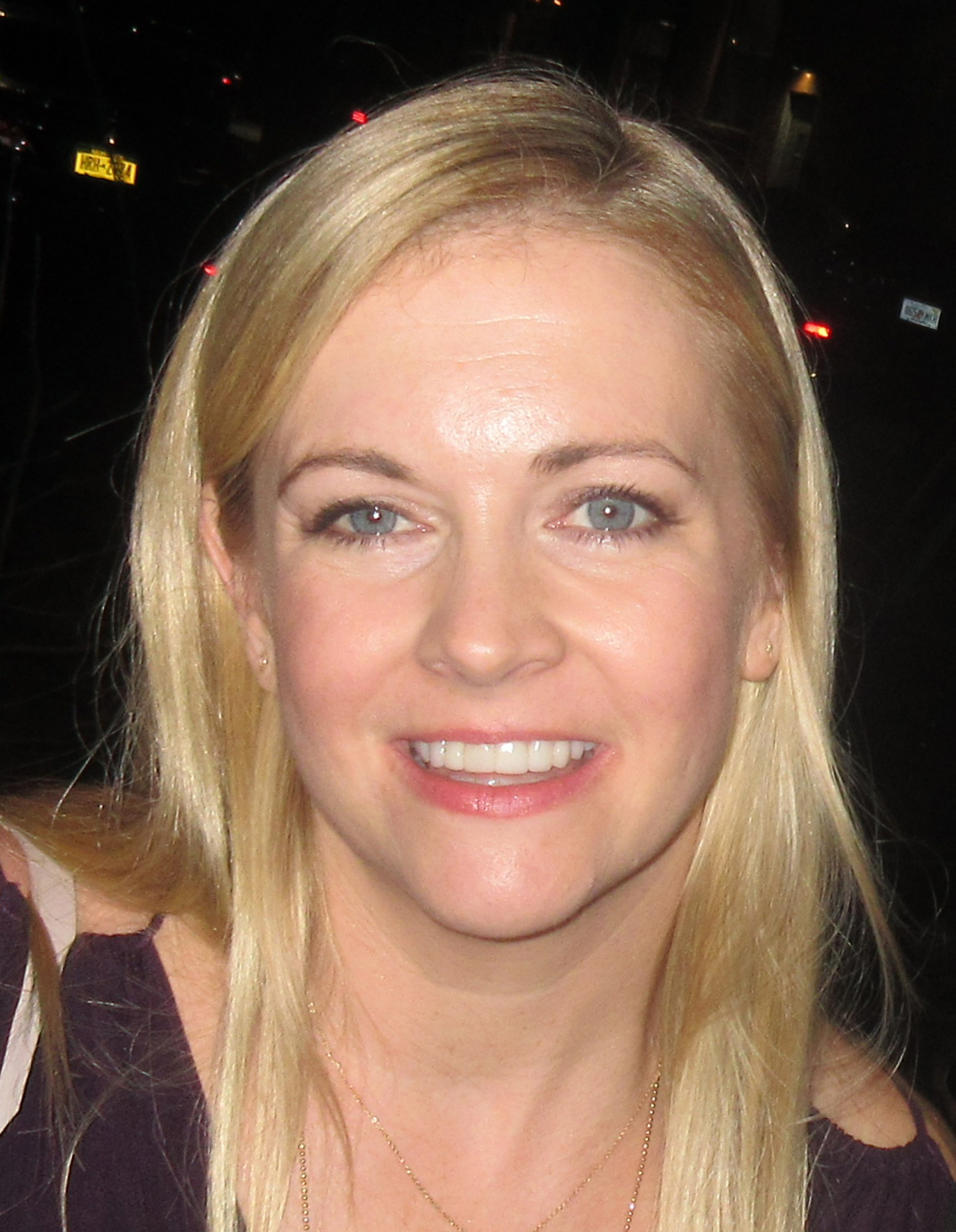
Melissa Joan Hart

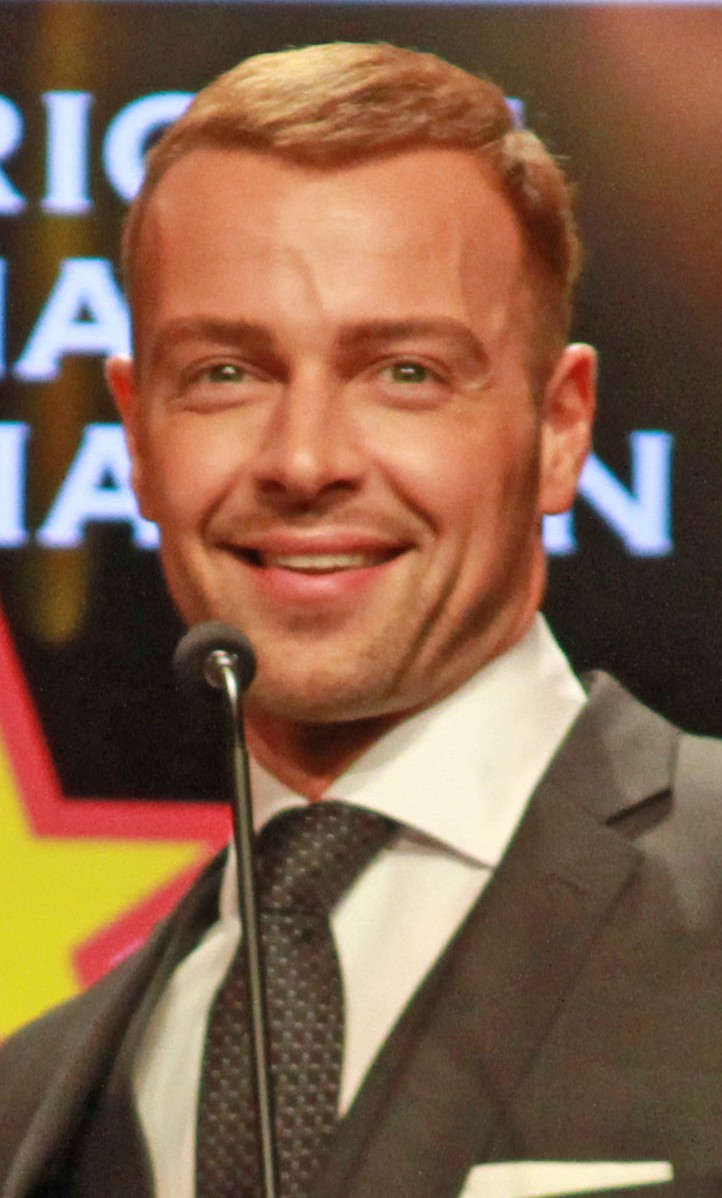
Joey Lawrence

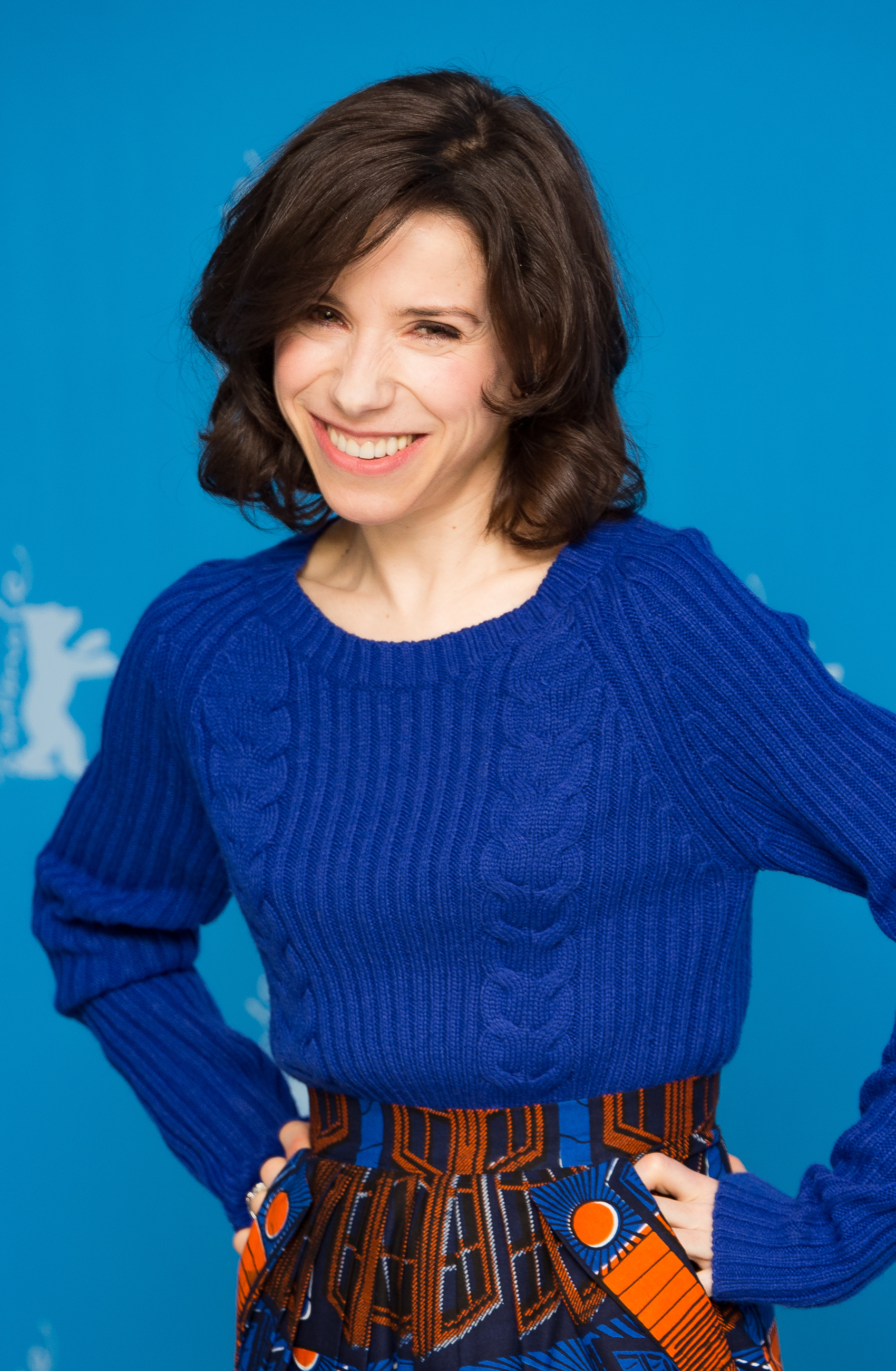
Sally Hawkins

- April 1
  - Troy Baker, American actor and musician
  - David Oyelowo, English-American actor
  - Hazem El Masri, Lebanese-Australian rugby league player
- April 2
  - Lucy Diakovska, German-Bulgarian pop singer
  - Daisuke Namikawa, Japanese voice actor
  - Rory Sabbatini, South African golfer
- April 3 – Will Mellor, English actor
- April 4
  - Emerson, Brazilian footballer
  - James Roday Rodriguez, American actor, director and screenwriter
  - Paula Yacoubian, Lebanese politician and journalist
- April 5
  - Sterling K. Brown, African-American actor
  - Fernando Morientes, Spanish footballer
  - Natascha Ragosina, Russian boxer
  - Chandana Sooriyaarachchi, Sri Lankan politician
  - Henrik Stenson, Swedish golfer
- April 6 – Candace Cameron Bure, American actress
- April 7 – Eric Wareheim, American comedian
- April 10 – Jan Werner Danielsen, Norwegian singer (d. 2006)
- April 12 – Andrei Lipanov, Russian ice skater
- April 13
  - Glenn Howerton, American actor, producer and writer
  - Jonathan Brandis, American actor (d. 2003)
- April 14 – Anna DeForge, American basketball player
- April 15
  - Jason Bonsignore, Canadian ice-hockey player
  - Steve Williams, British rower
- April 16
  - David Lyons, Australian actor
  - Robert Dahlqvist, Swedish guitarist and vocalist (d. 2017)
  - Shu Qi, Taiwanese actress
- April 18
  - Melissa Joan Hart, American actress
  - Sean Maguire, British actor and singer
- April 19
  - Wyatt Cenac, American actor, writer and director
  - Kim Young-oh, South Korean illustrator
- April 20
  - Joey Lawrence, American actor
  - Shay Given, Irish football goalkeeper
- April 21 – Rommel Adducul, Filipino basketball player
- April 22 – Michał Żewłakow, Polish footballer
- April 23 – Darren Huckerby, English footballer
- April 25
  - Tim Duncan, American basketball player
  - Denis Kartsev, Russian professional ice hockey player
  - Rainer Schüttler, German tennis player
  - Kim Jong-kook, South Korean singer, television personality
- April 26 – Elisabet Reinsalu, Estonian actress
- April 27 – Sally Hawkins, English actress
- April 28 – Joseph N'Do, Cameroonian international footballer
- April 29 – Kanaka Herath, Sri Lankan politician

=== May ===
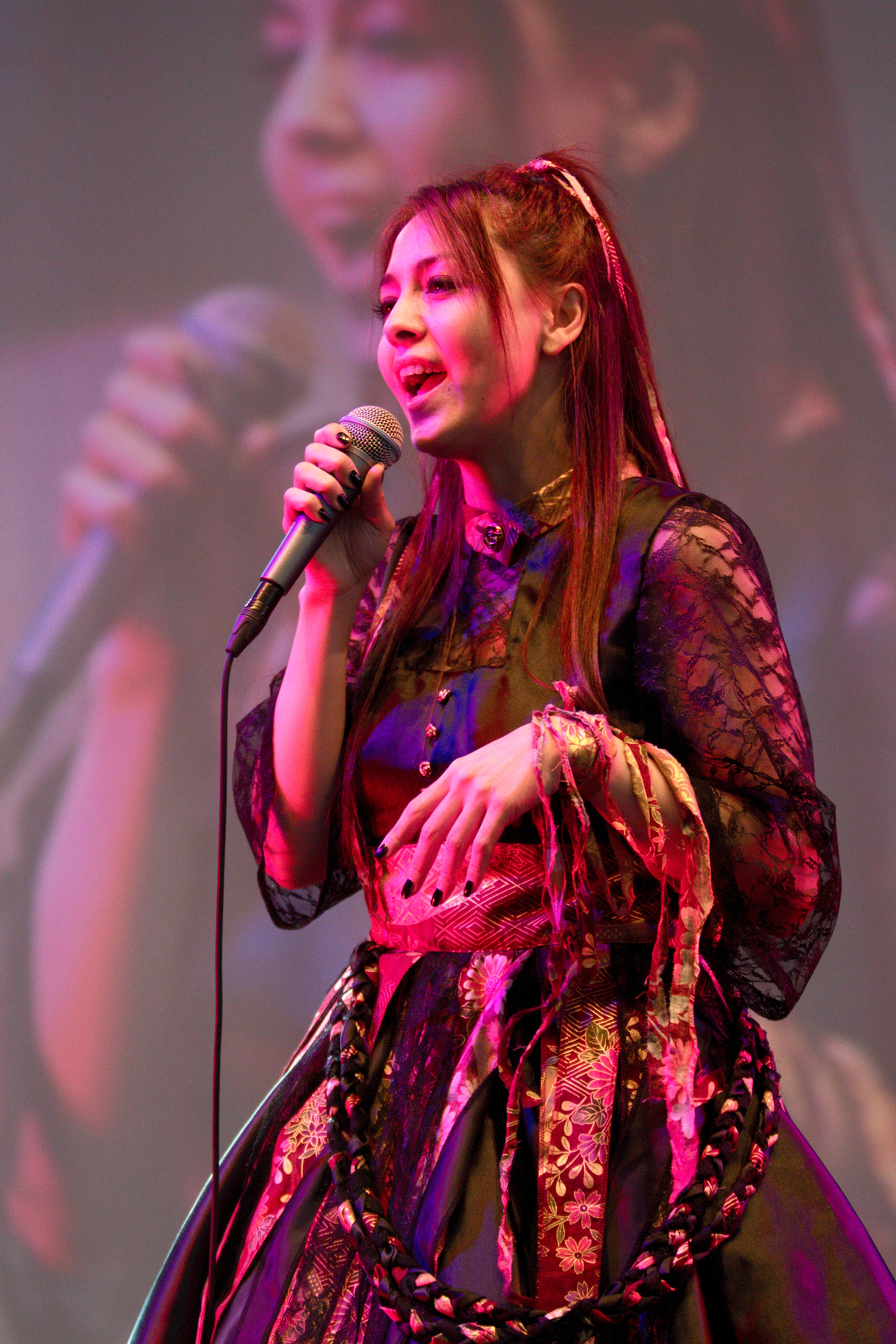
Anza

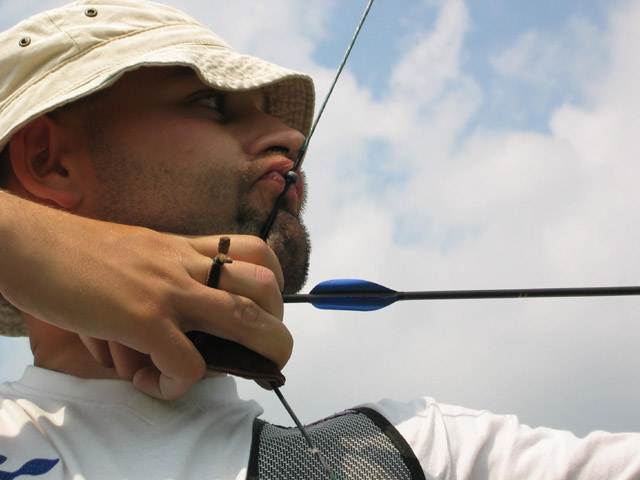
Michele Frangilli

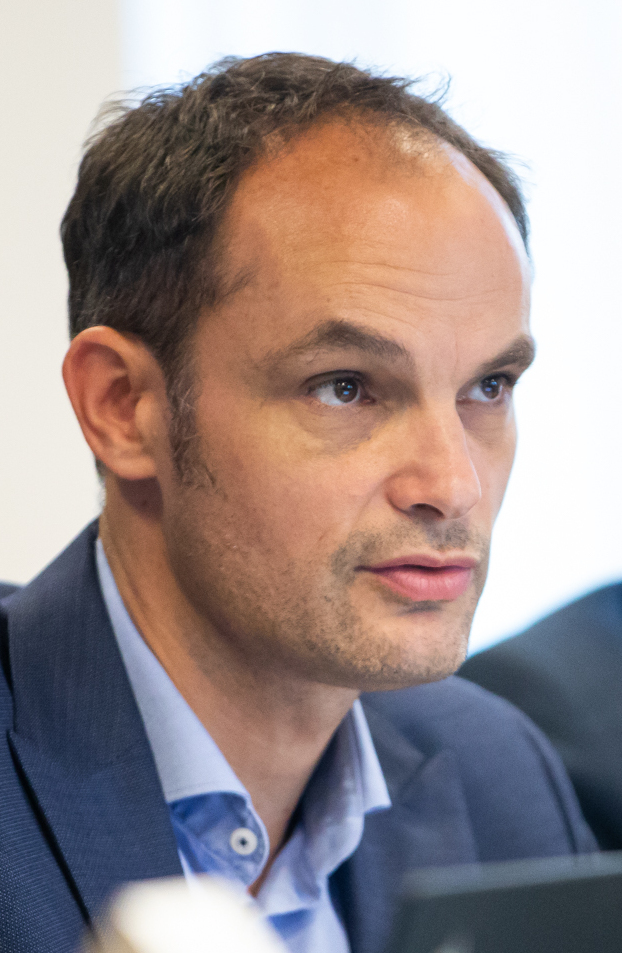
Anže Logar

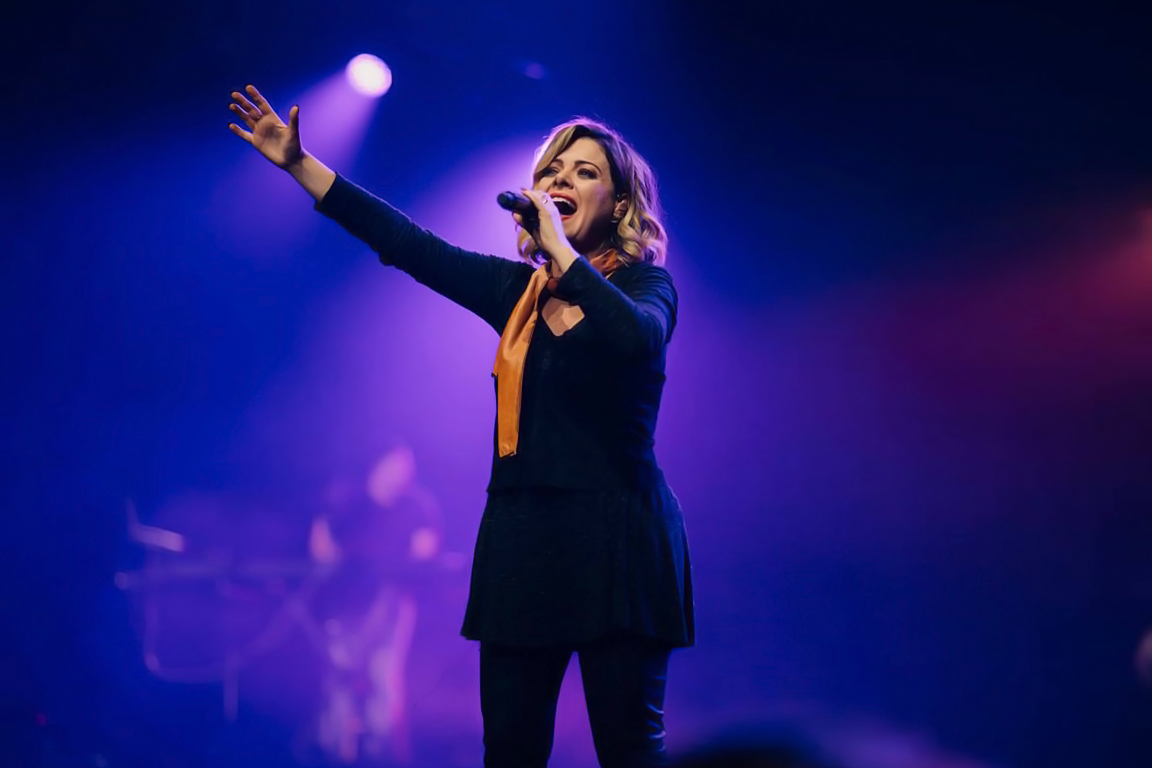
Ana Paula Valadão

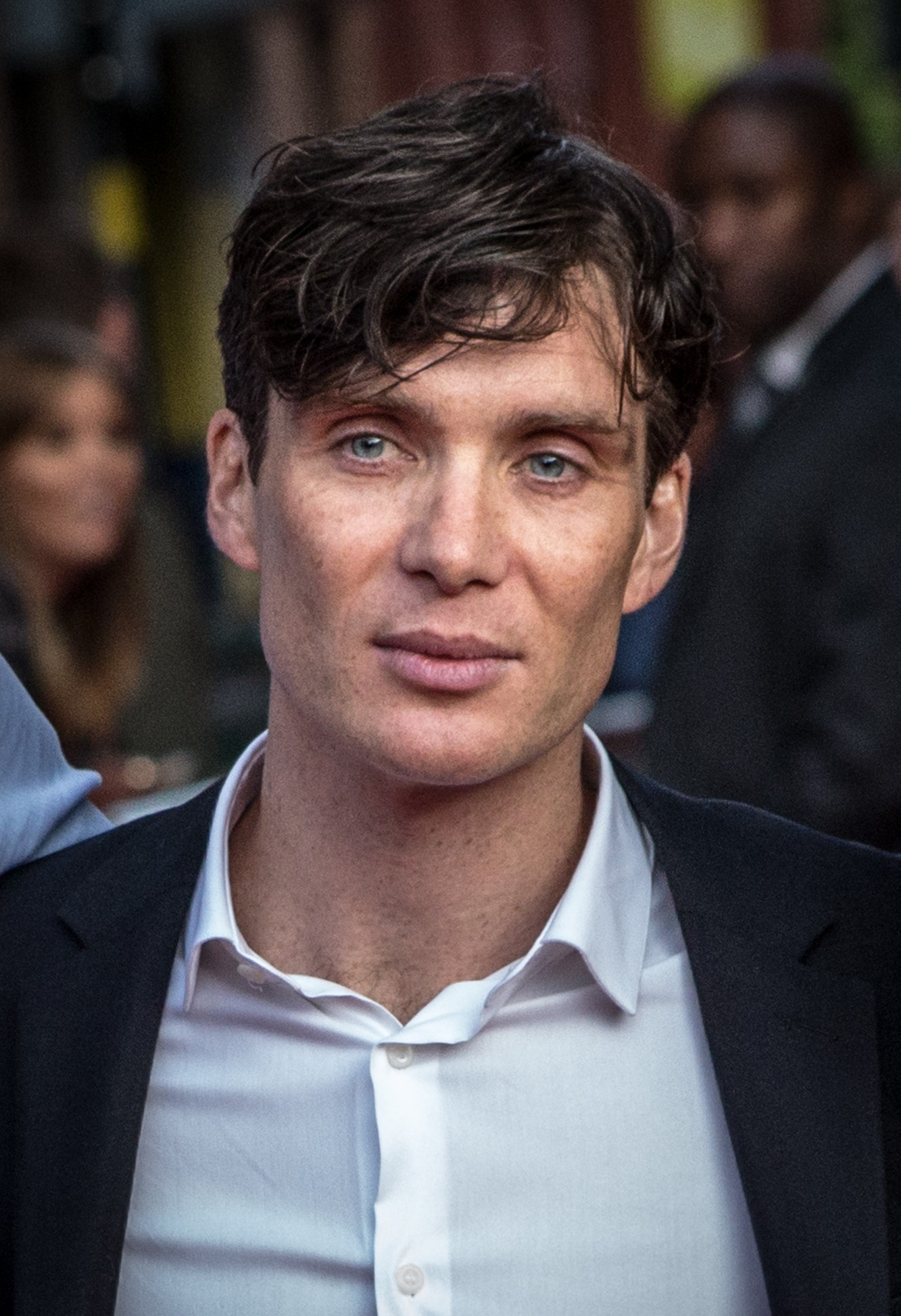
Cillian Murphy

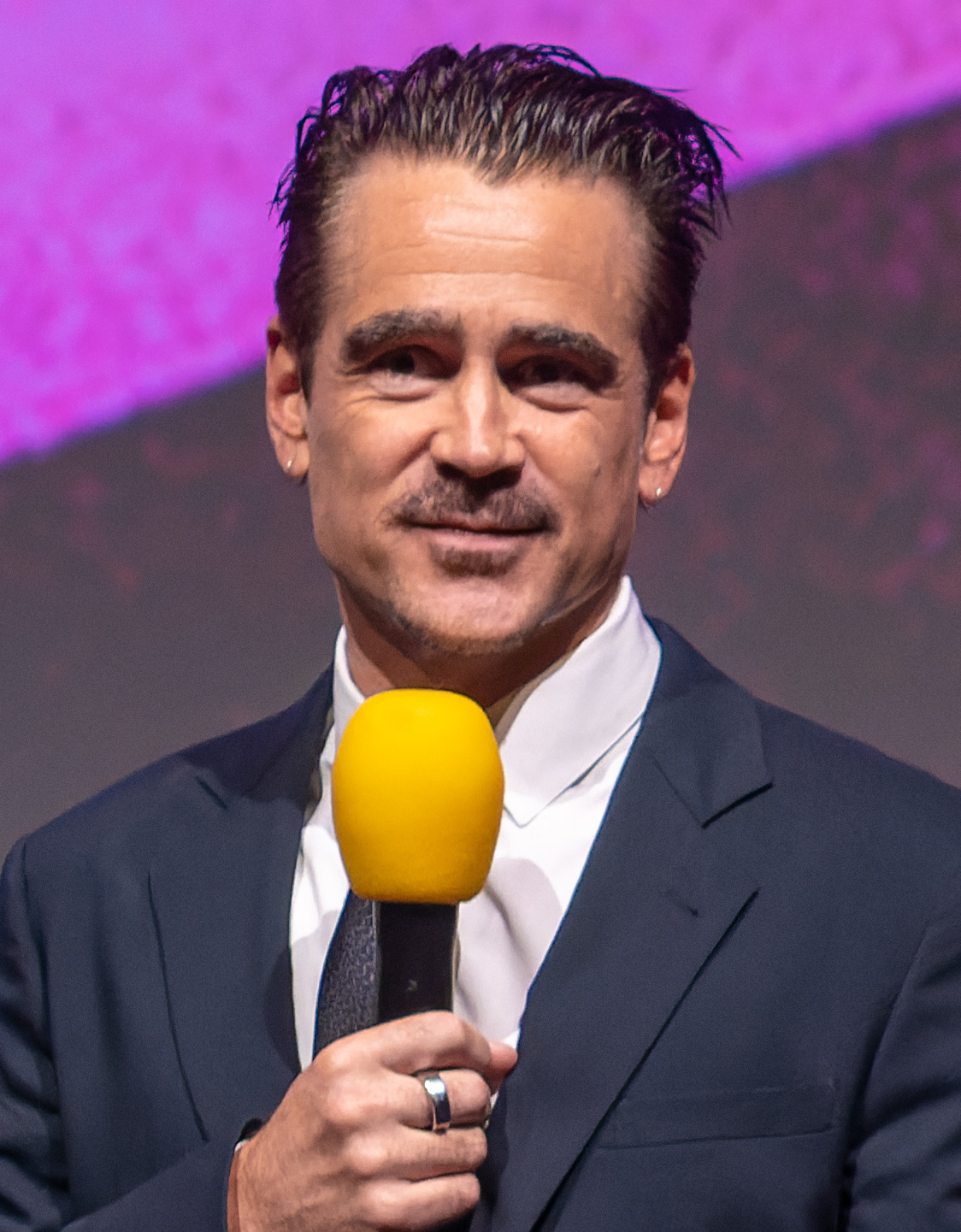
Colin Farrell

- May 1
  - Darius McCrary, American actor
  - Michele Frangilli, Italian archer
- May 3
  - Beto, Portuguese footballer
  - Jeff Halpern, American ice hockey player
- May 4 – Anza, Japanese actress and singer best known for playing the character of Sailor Moon in some Sailor Moon musical
- May 5 – Juan Pablo Sorín, Argentine footballer and sports broadcaster
- May 8 – Martha Wainwright, Canadian-American folk-pop singer
- May 10
  - Rhona Bennett, American actress, singer and model
  - Rogério Oliveira da Costa, Brazilian-born football striker (d. 2006)
- May 14 – Martine McCutcheon, British actress and singer
- May 15
  - Mark Kennedy, Irish footballer
  - Jacek Krzynówek, Polish footballer
  - Anže Logar, Slovenian politician, minister of foreign affairs
- May 17 – Mayte Martínez, Spanish athlete
- May 20 – Ramón Hernández, Venezuelan baseball player
- May 23 – Ricardinho, Brazilian football player and coach
- May 25
  - Stefan Holm, Swedish high jumper
  - Cillian Murphy, Irish actor
  - Erinn Hayes, American actress
  - Nadine Heredia, Peruvian politician, First Lady of Peru
- May 26 – Paul Collingwood, English cricketer
- May 28
  - Alexei Nemov, Russian gymnast
  - Liam O'Brien, American actor
- May 31
  - Colin Farrell, Irish actor
  - Roar Ljøkelsøy, Norwegian ski jumper

=== June ===
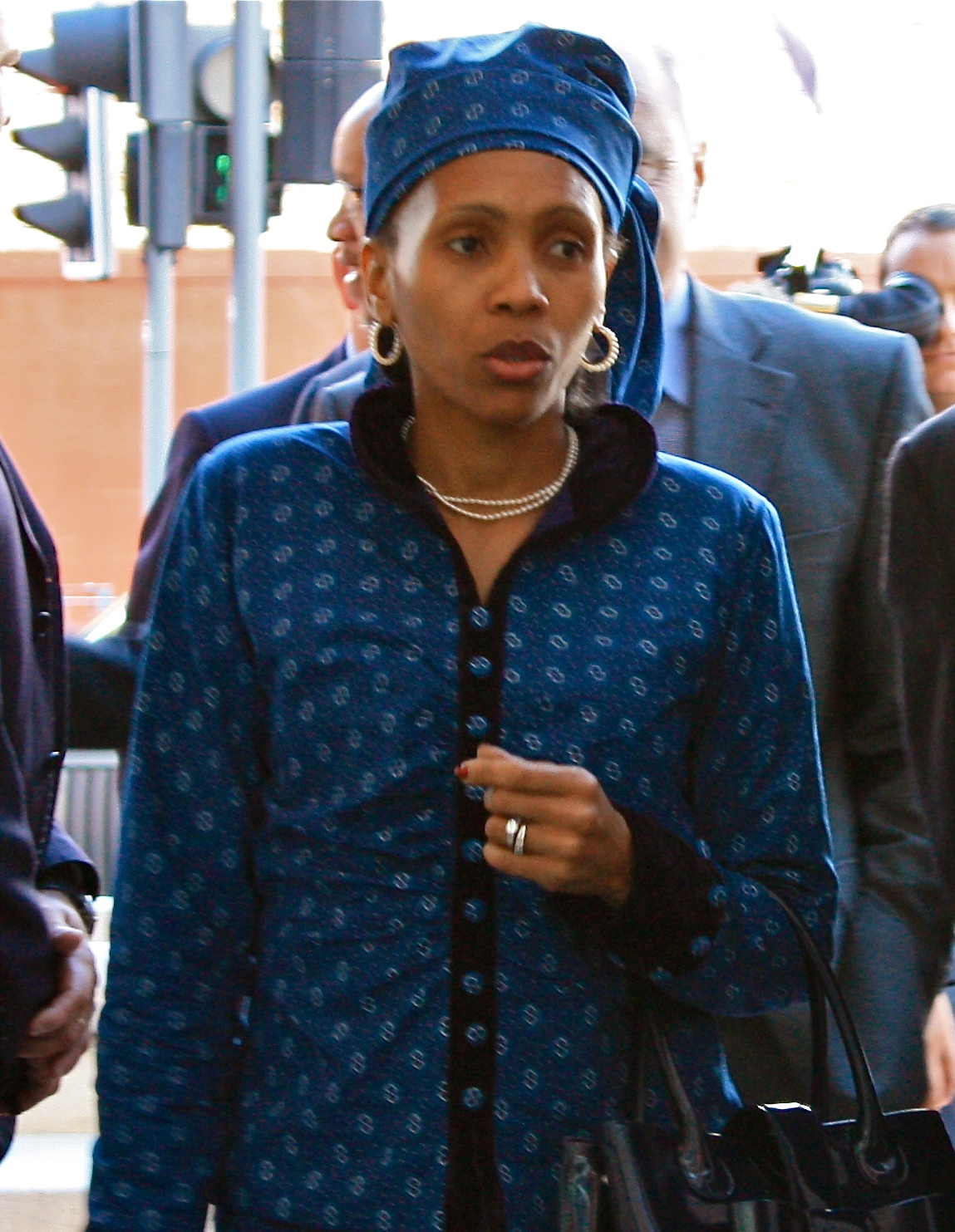
'Masenate Mohato Seeiso

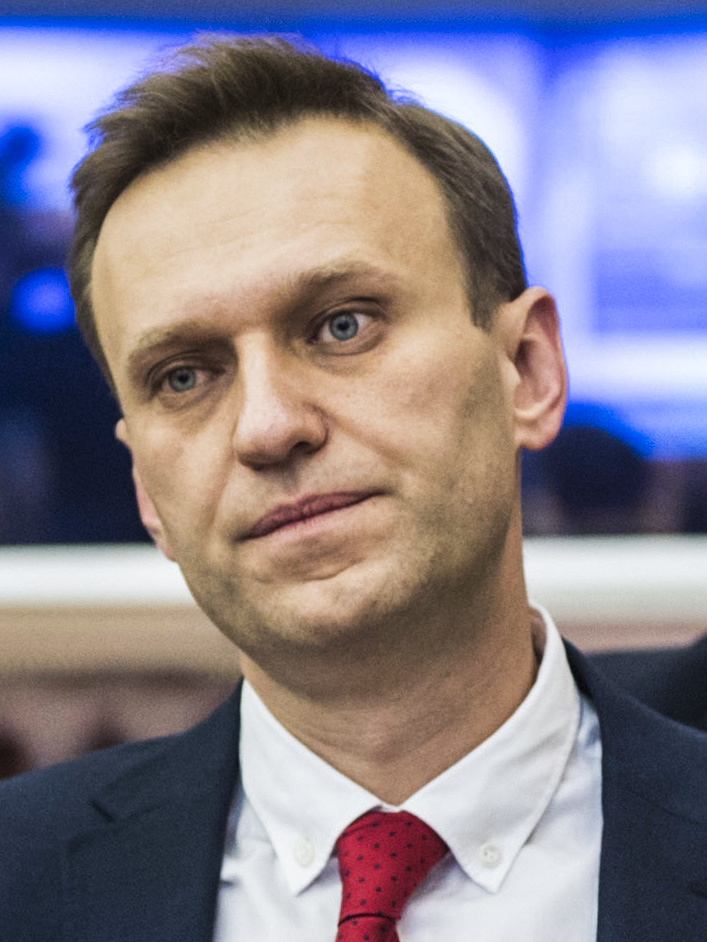
Alexei Navalny

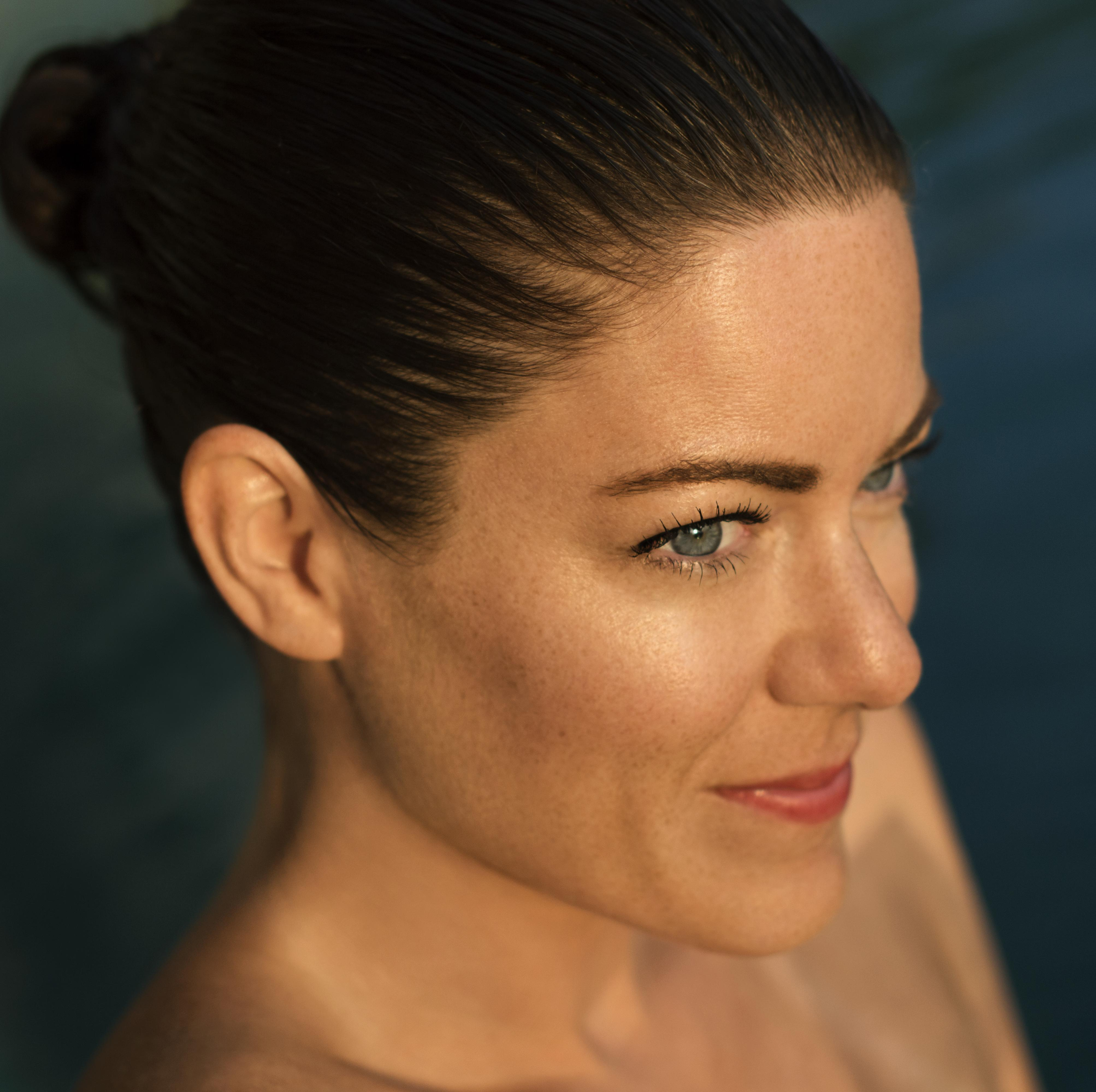
Emilie-Claire Barlow

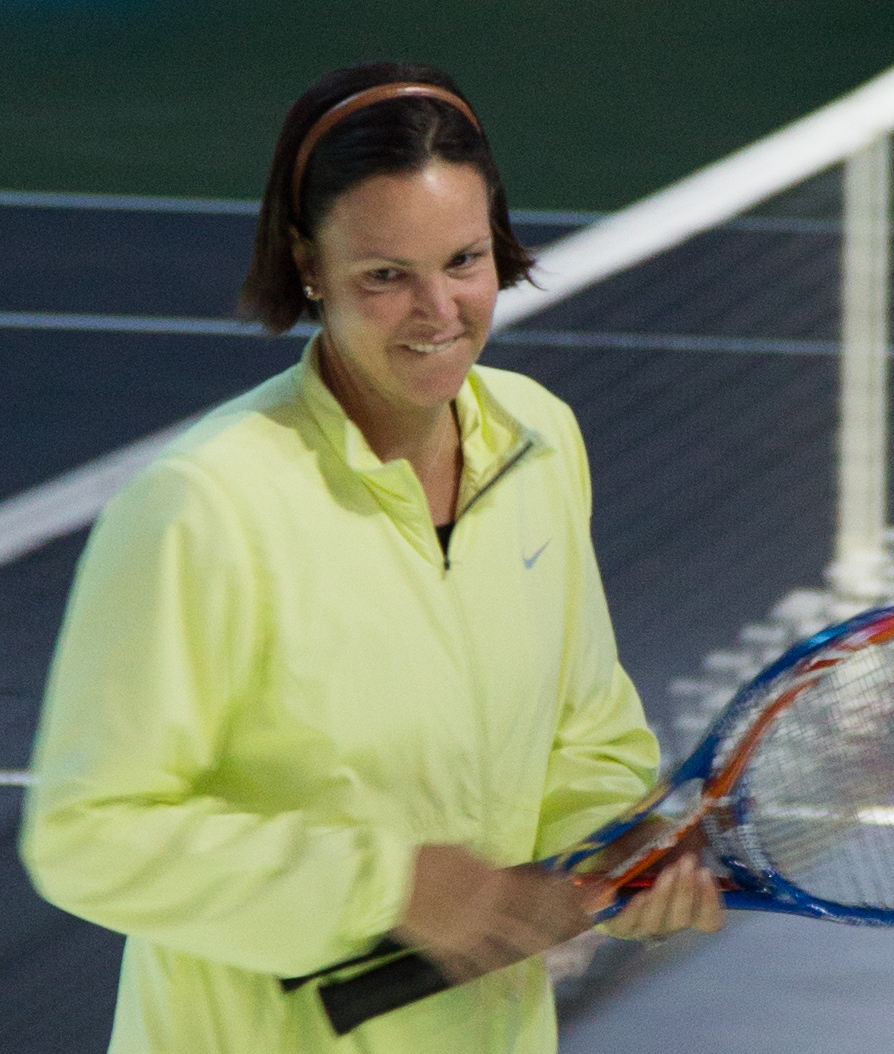
Lindsay Davenport

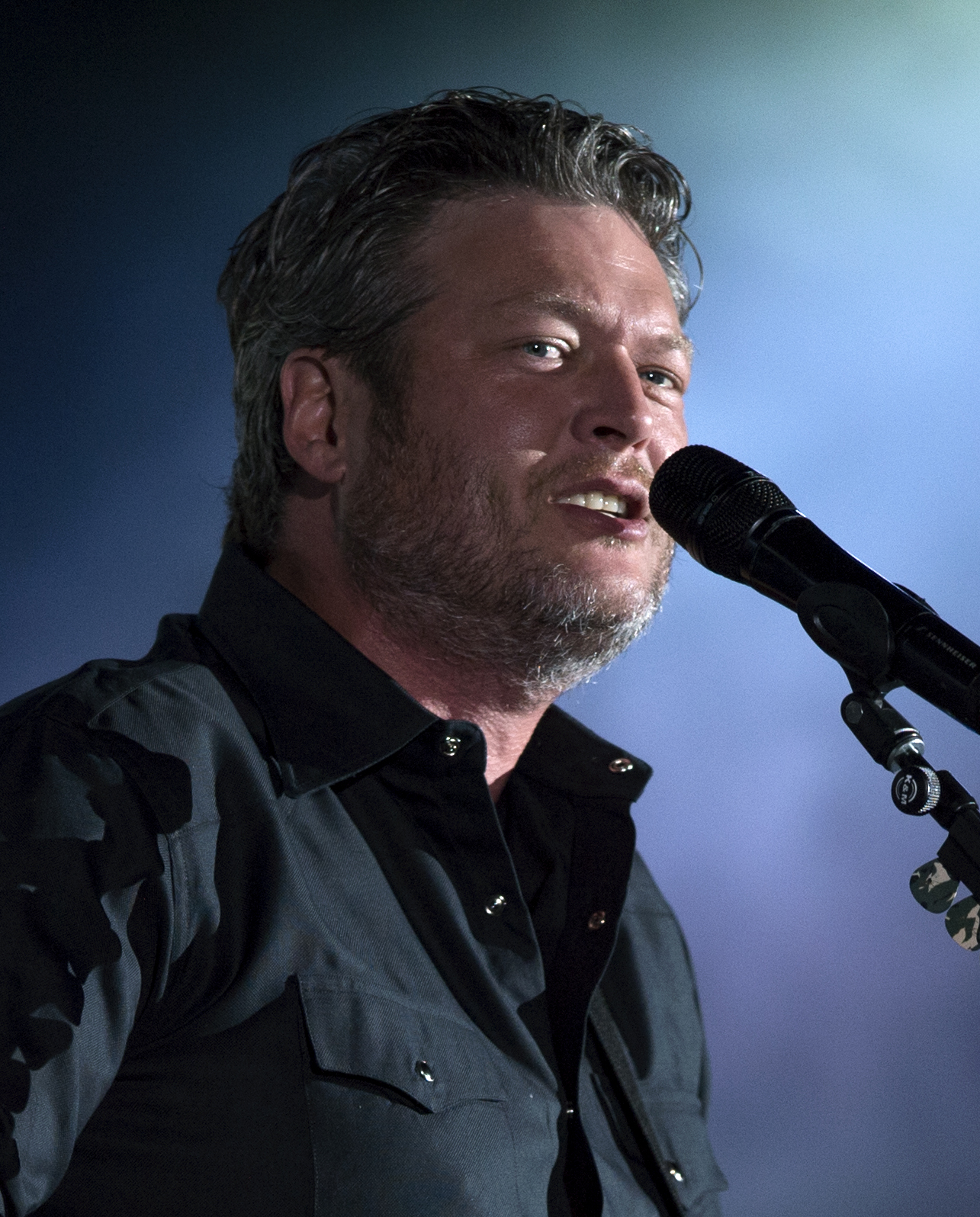
Blake Shelton

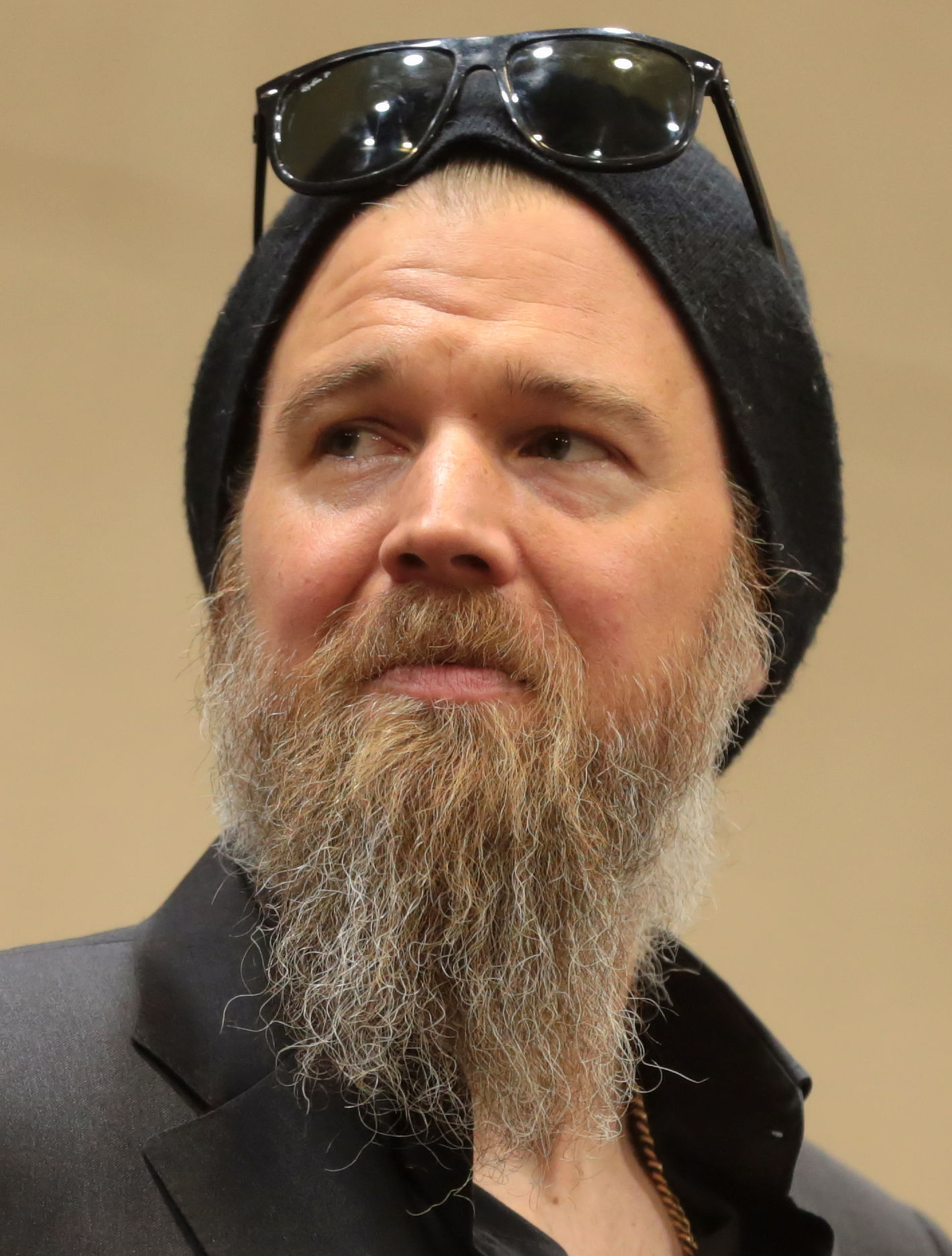
Ryan Hurst

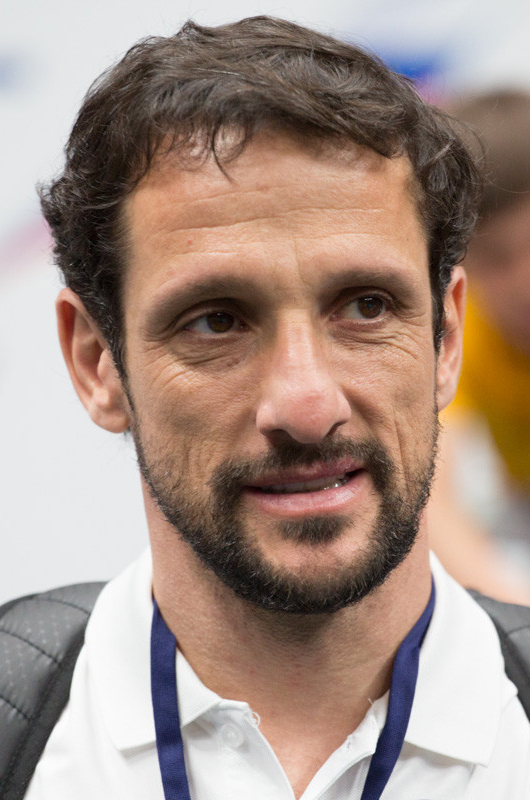
Juliano Belletti

- June 2
  - Antônio Rodrigo Nogueira, Brazilian mixed martial artist
  - Tim Rice-Oxley, English rock musician/composer (Keane)
  - Queen 'Masenate Mohato Seeiso of Lesotho
- June 3 – Jamie McMurray, American race car driver
- June 4
  - Alexei Navalny, Russian lawyer and political activist (d. 2024)
  - Nenad Zimonjić, Serbian tennis player
- June 5
  - Aesop Rock, American hip-hop artist
  - Marc Worden, Canadian actor and voice actor
- June 6
  - Emilie-Claire Barlow, Canadian actress and singer
  - Geoff Rowley, English skateboarder
- June 7
  - Necro, American rapper
  - Nora Salinas, Mexican actress and model
  - Mirsad Türkcan, Serbian born-Turkish basketball player
- June 8 – Lindsay Davenport, American tennis player
- June 10
  - Esther Ouwehand, Dutch politician, parliamentarian for the Party for the Animals
  - Mariana Seoane, Mexican actress
- June 12 – Thomas Sørensen, Danish football goalkeeper
- June 13
  - Kym Marsh, British singer (Hear'Say) and actress
  - Jason "J" Brown, British singer (5ive)
- June 14 – Alan Carr, English comedian
- June 16 – Tom Lenk, American actor
- June 17
  - Estelle Folest, French politician
  - Peter Svidler, Russian chess grandmaster
- June 18
  - Petri Haapimaa, Finnish footballer and coach
  - Brady Haran, Australian-British founder and cast of Numberphile channel
  - Blake Shelton, American singer
- June 19 – Ryan Hurst, American actor
- June 20 – Juliano Belletti, Brazilian footballer
- June 21 – Antonio Cochran, American football player
- June 22 – Mike O'Brien, American actor, writer and comedian
- June 23
  - Brandon Stokley, American football player
  - Paola Suárez, Argentine tennis player
  - Emmanuelle Vaugier, Canadian actress
  - Patrick Vieira, French footballer
  - Gavin Williamson, British politician, Secretary of State for Education
- June 25 – Maurren Maggi, Brazilian athlete and politician
- June 26
  - Cédric Jimenez, French film producer, film director and screenwriter
  - Wilson Lima, Brazilian politician and journalist
  - Alexander Zakharchenko, Ukrainian separatist rebel (d. 2018)
- June 27 – Joseph Sikora, American actor
- June 28
  - Nawaf Al-Temyat, Saudi Arabian football (soccer) player
  - David Palmer, Australian squash player
  - Hesha Withanage, Sri Lankan politician
- June 29
  - Annette Beutler, Swiss professional racing cyclist
  - Katsutoshi Domori, Japanese football player
  - Angelo Lekkas, Australian rules footballer
- June 30
  - Tamara Sedmak, Swiss television presenter, model and actress
  - Jason Bostic, American football defensive back
  - Christine Schürrer, German serial killer
  - Gilbert Yvel, Dutch mixed martial artist

=== July ===
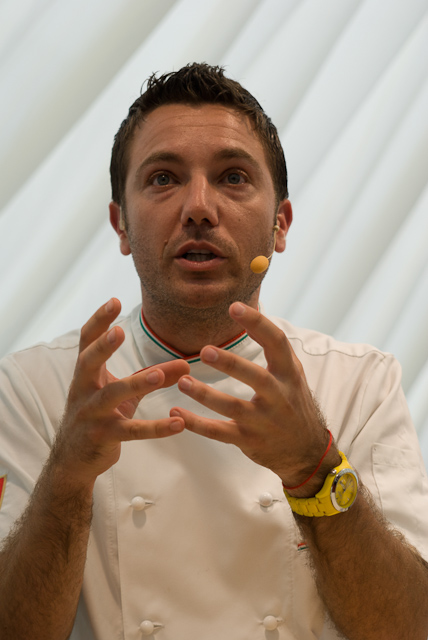
Gino D'Acampo

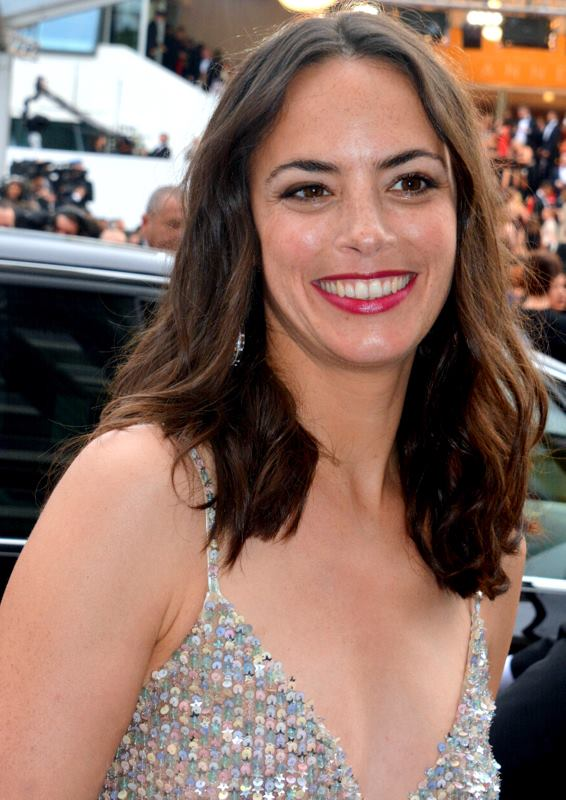
Bérénice Bejo

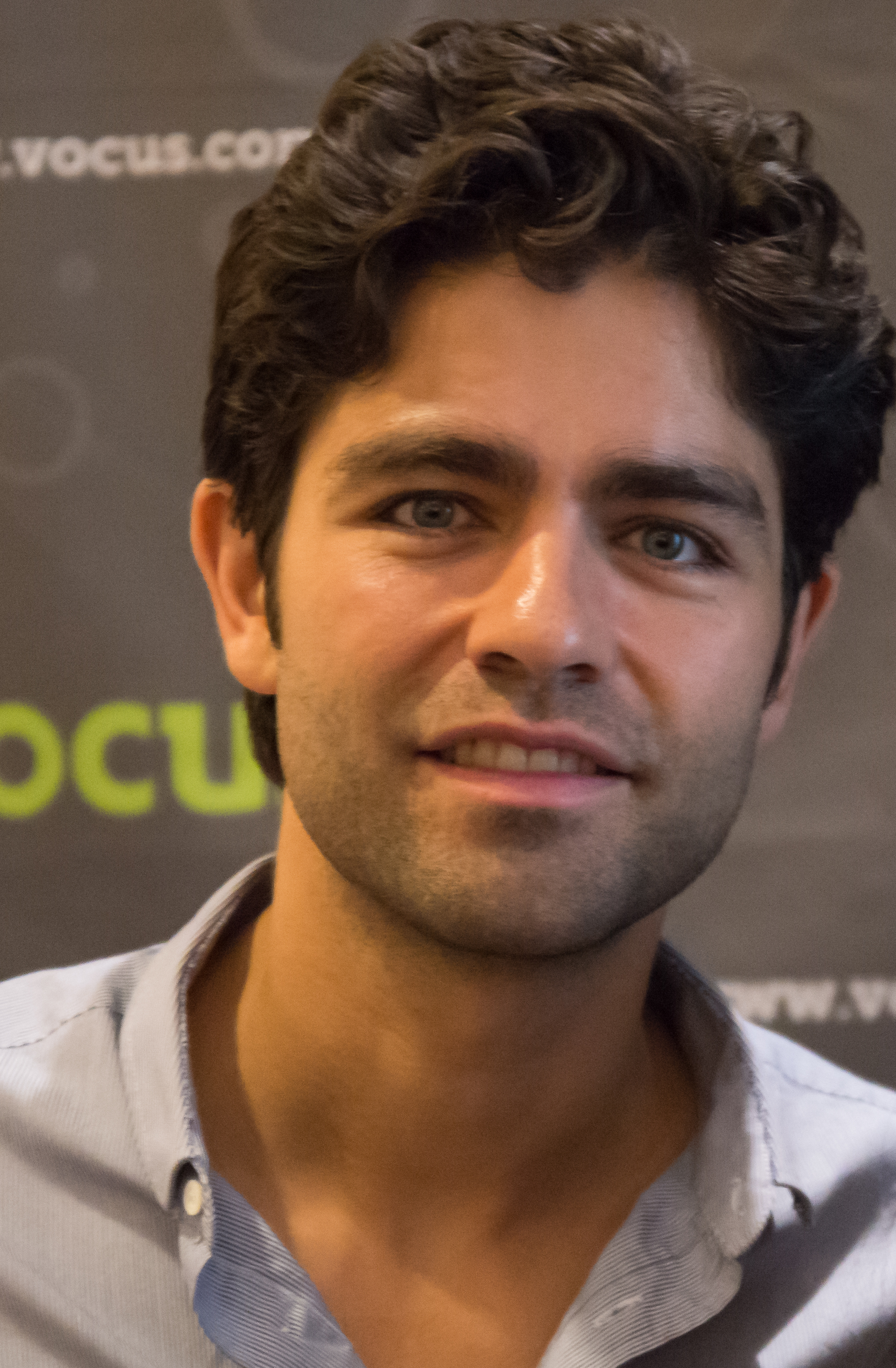
Adrian Grenier

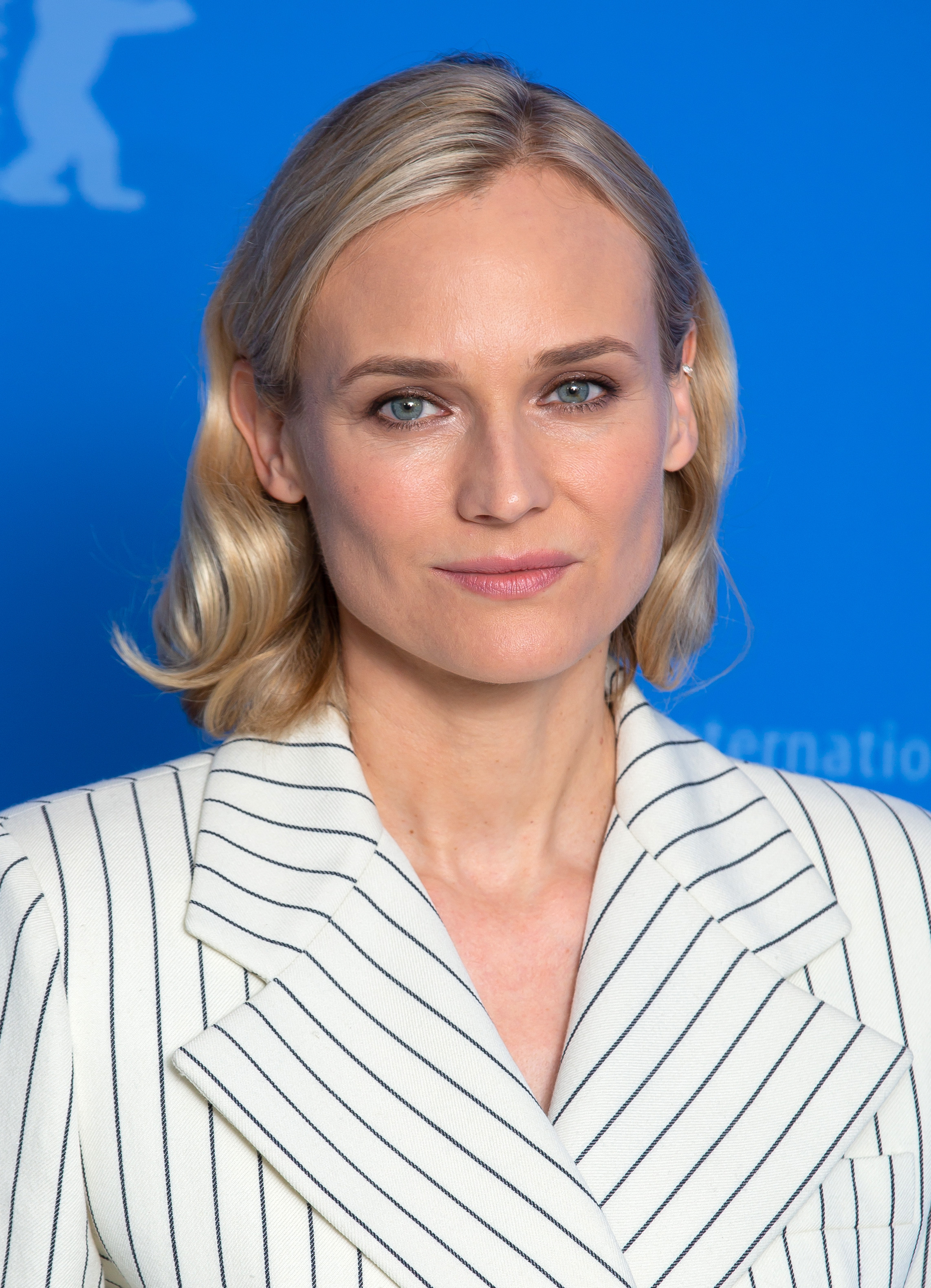
Diane Kruger

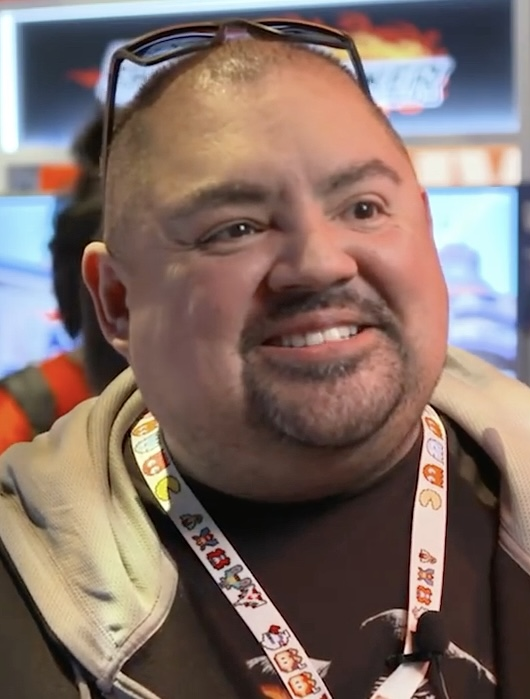
Gabriel Iglesias

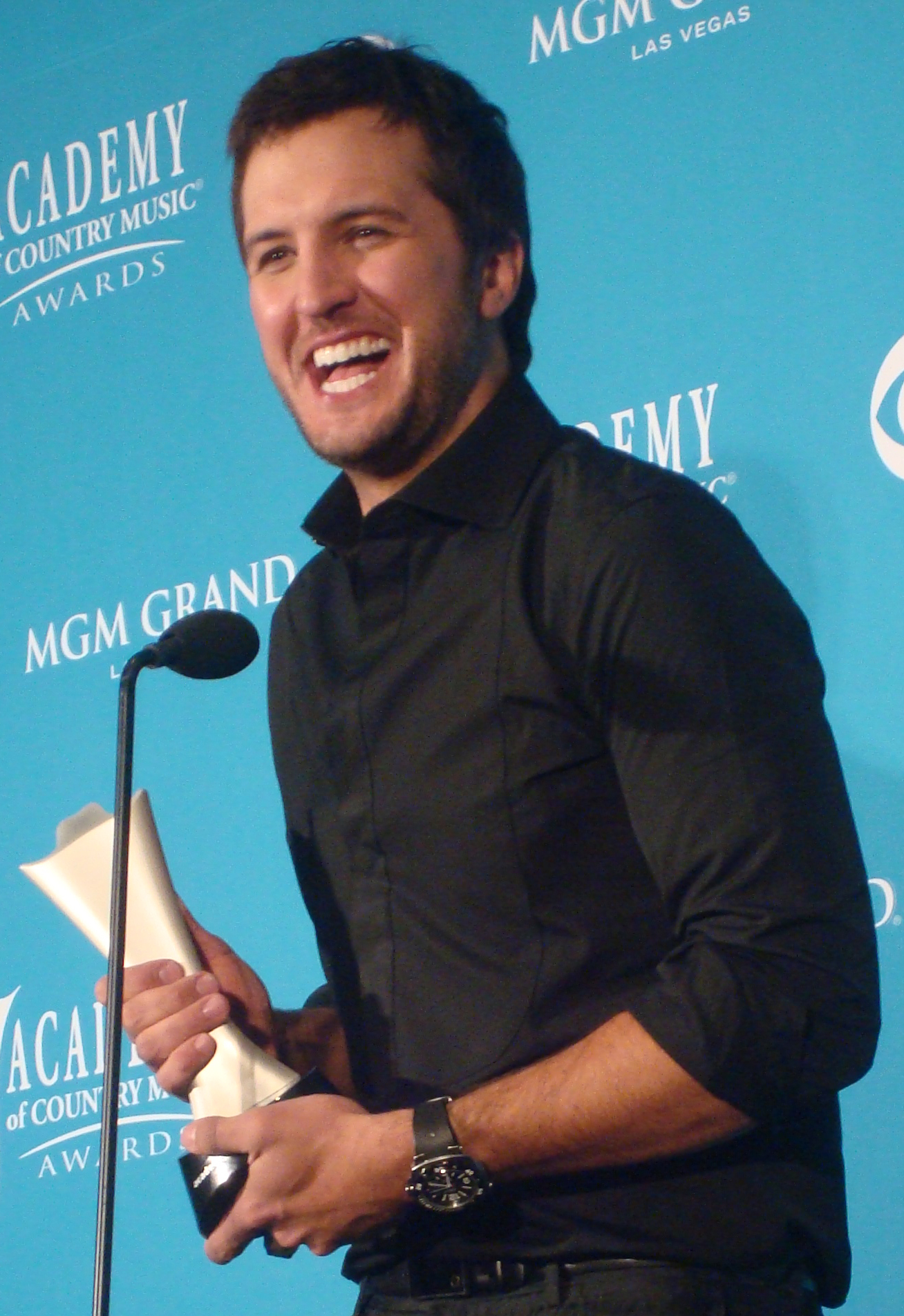
Luke Bryan

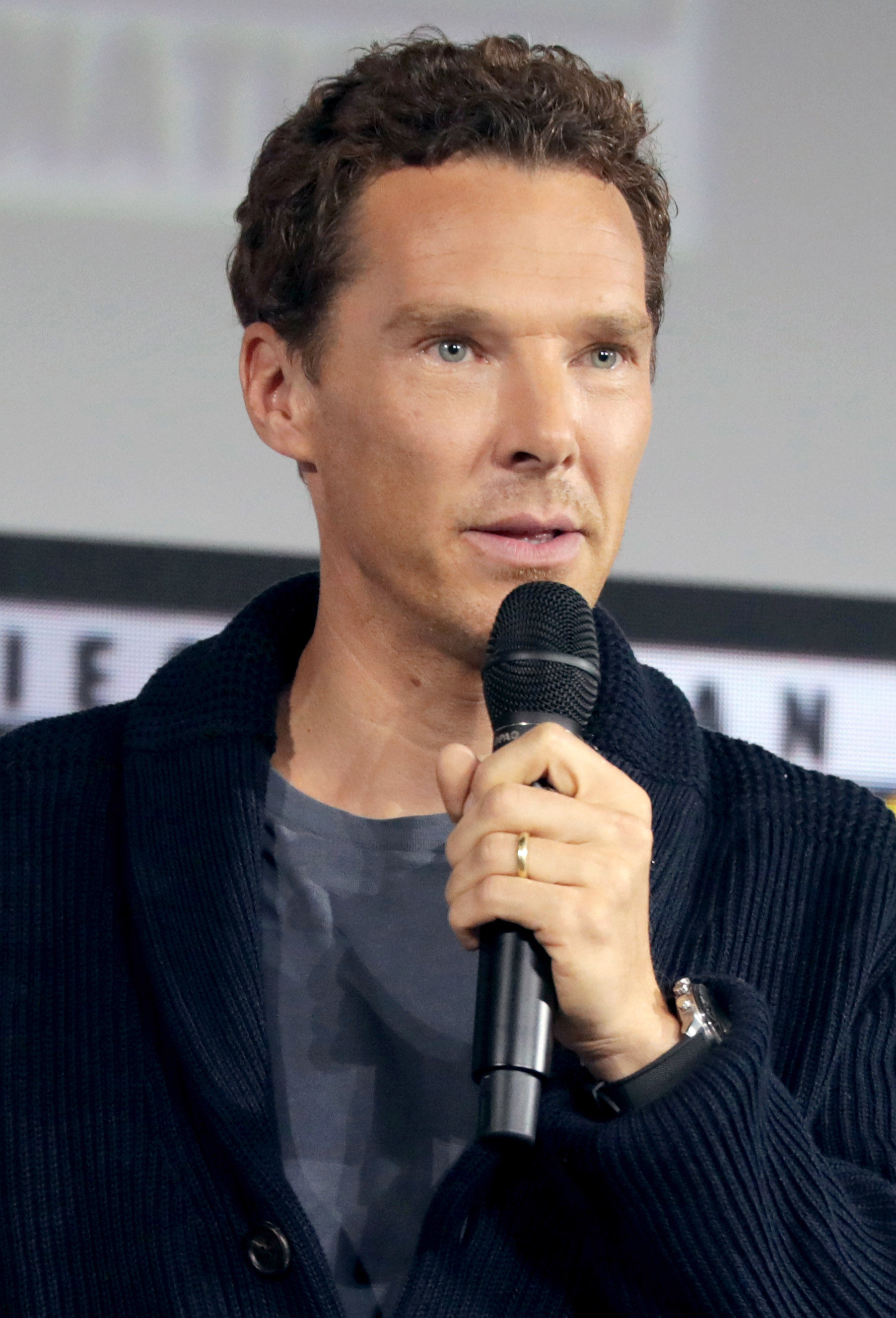
Benedict Cumberbatch

- July 1
  - Patrick Kluivert, Dutch footballer
  - Ruud van Nistelrooy, Dutch footballer
- July 2
  - Kon Arimura, Malaysian-Japanese radio personality, film critic and film commentator
  - Krisztián Lisztes, Hungarian footballer
  - Tommy Pistol, American actor and director
- July 3
  - Shane Lynch, Irish singer
  - Wanderlei Silva, Brazilian mixed martial artist
  - Bobby Skinstad, Zimbabwean rugby union player
  - Andrea Barber, American actress
  - Henry Olonga, Zambian-Zimbabwean cricketer
- July 4
  - Jo Chen, American-Taiwanese comic book artist and writer
  - Daijiro Kato, Japanese motorcycle racer (d. 2003)
- July 5
  - Jamie Elman, Canadian-American actor
  - Nuno Gomes, Portuguese footballer
  - Rufus Johnson, American rapper also known as Bizarre
- July 7
  - Lina Teoh, Malaysian actress, television host and model
  - Bérénice Bejo, Argentine actress
  - Hamish Linklater, American actor and playwright
- July 8
  - Ellen MacArthur, English yachtswoman
  - Grettell Valdez, Mexican television and film actress and fashion model
- July 9
  - Fred Savage, American actor and director
  - Arturo Carmona, Mexican actor
  - Elliot Cowan, English actor
- July 10
  - Edmílson, Brazilian footballer
  - Ludovic Giuly, French footballer
  - Adrian Grenier, American actor, musician and director
  - Elissa Slotkin, American politician
- July 11 – Eduardo Nájera, Mexican basketball player
- July 12
  - Anna Friel, English actress
  - Tracie Spencer, American R&B singer
  - Kyrsten Sinema, American politician
- July 14 – Geraint Jones, Papua New Guinea cricketer
- July 15
  - Diane Kruger, German actress
  - Gabriel Iglesias, American actor, voice actor and comedian
- July 16
  - Anna Smashnova, Israeli tennis player
  - Bobby Lashley, American professional wrestler
- July 17
  - Luke Bryan, American country music singer-songwriter
  - Marcos Senna, Brazilian born-Spanish footballer
  - Eric Winter, American actor and fashion model
- July 18 – Elsa Pataky, Spanish actress and model
- July 19
  - Benedict Cumberbatch, English actor
  - Eric Prydz, Swedish DJ and producer
- July 20 – Alex Yoong, Malaysian racing driver
- July 21
  - Cori Bush, American politician
  - David Eby, Canadian politician, 37th Premier of British Columbia
  - Tatyana Lebedeva, Russian long jumper
  - Jaime Murray, English actress
- July 23 – Judit Polgár, Hungarian chess player
- July 25 – Timur Mutsurayev, Chechen bard
- July 26 – Pável Pardo, Mexican footballer
- July 28 – Jacoby Shaddix, American singer
- July 31 – Paulo Wanchope, Costa Rican footballer

=== August ===
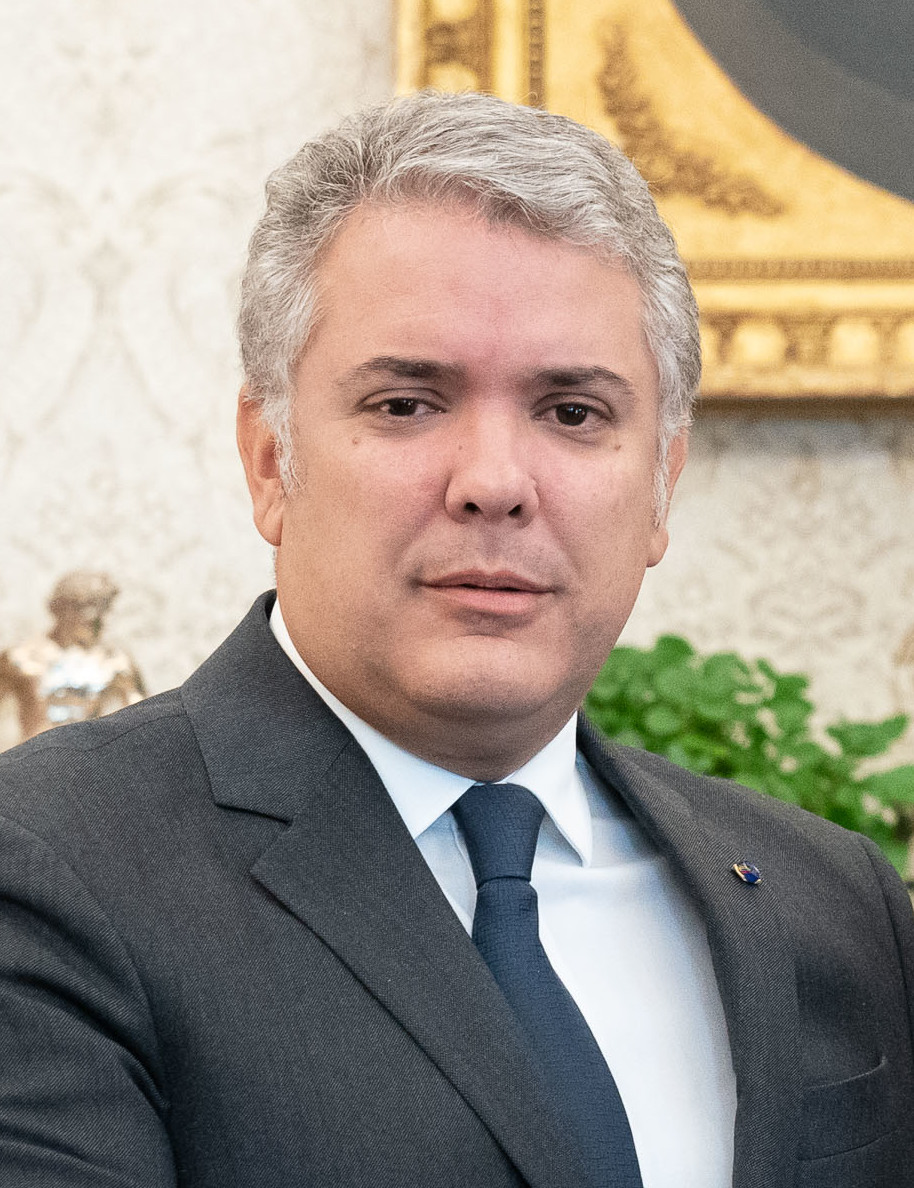
Iván Duque

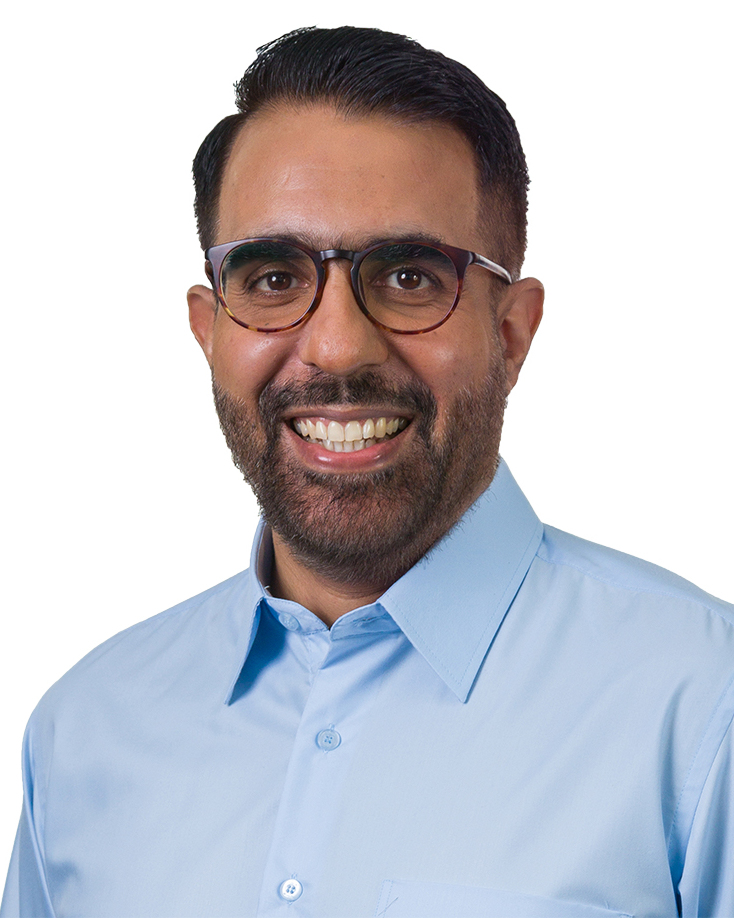
Pritam Singh

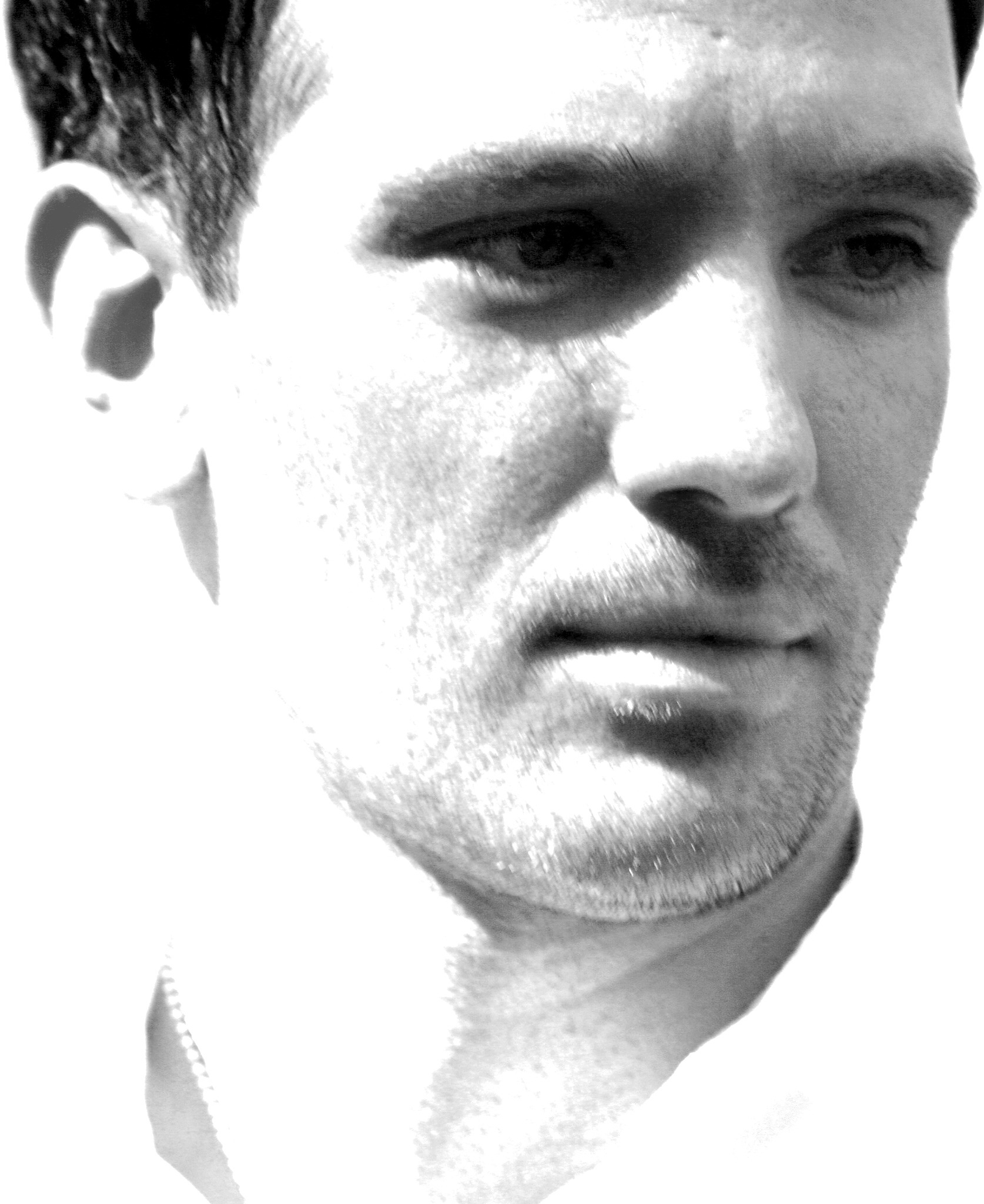
JC Chasez

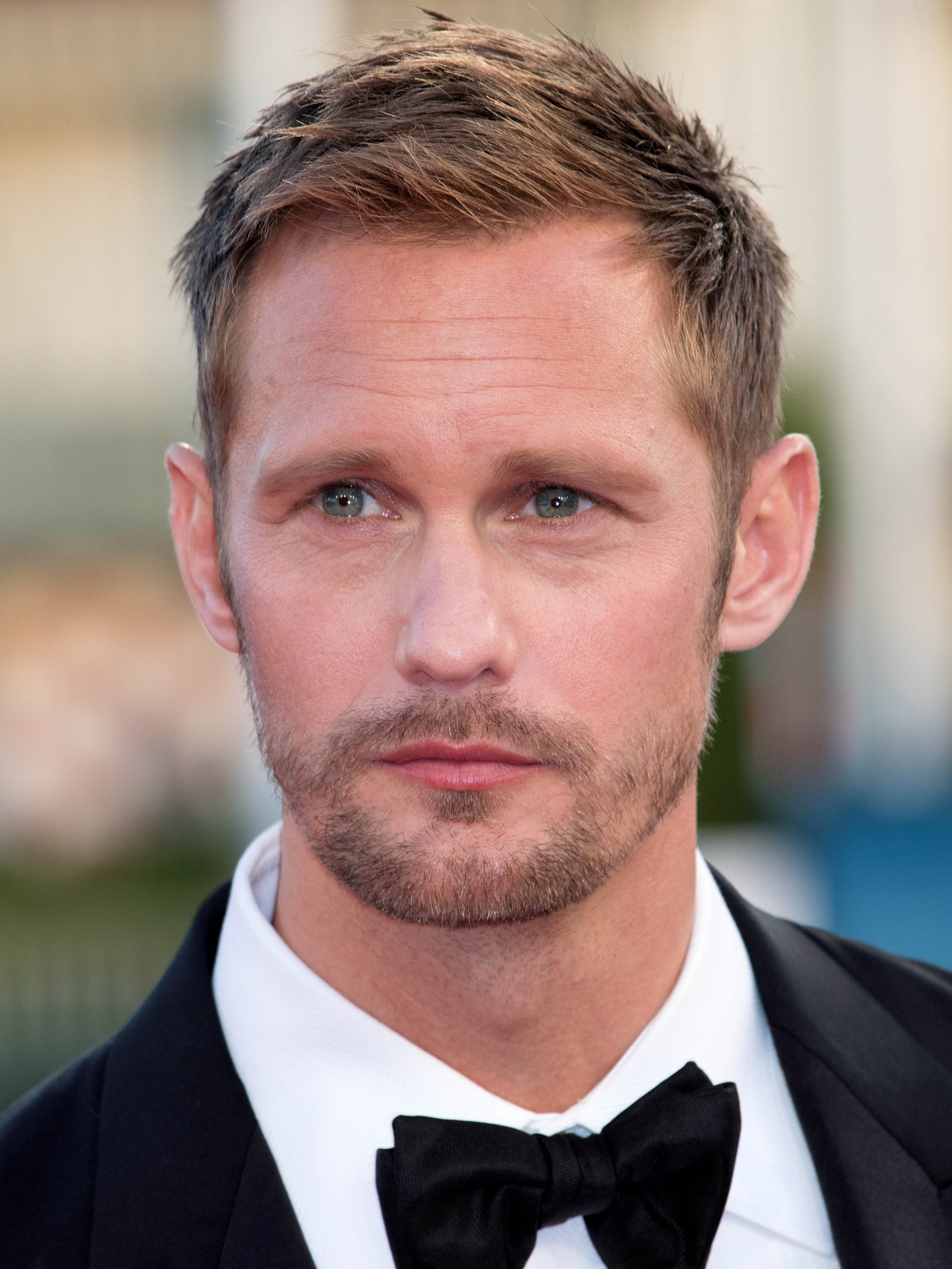
Alexander Skarsgård

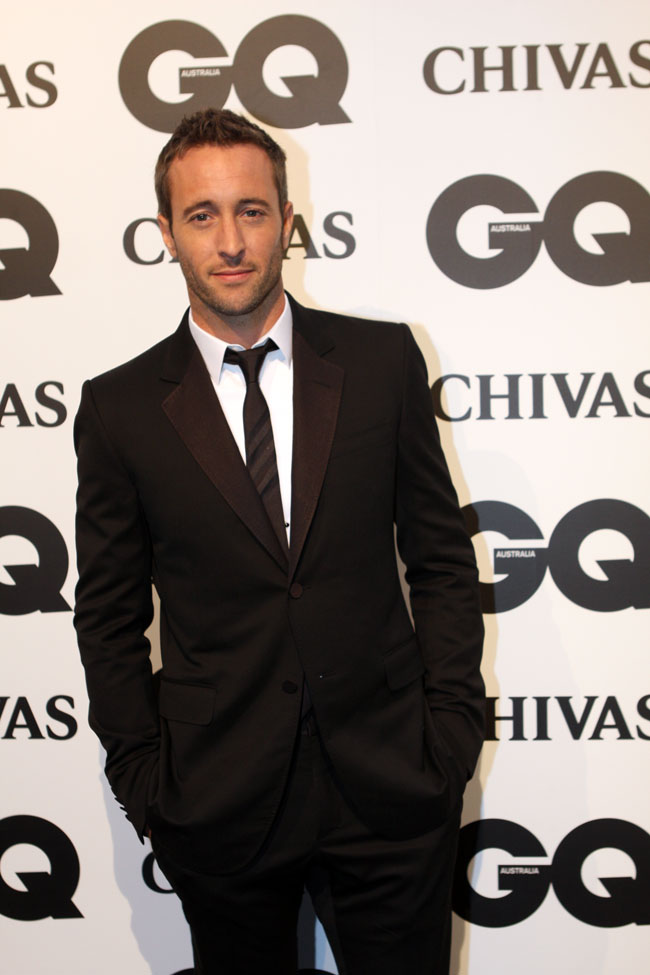
Alex O'Loughlin

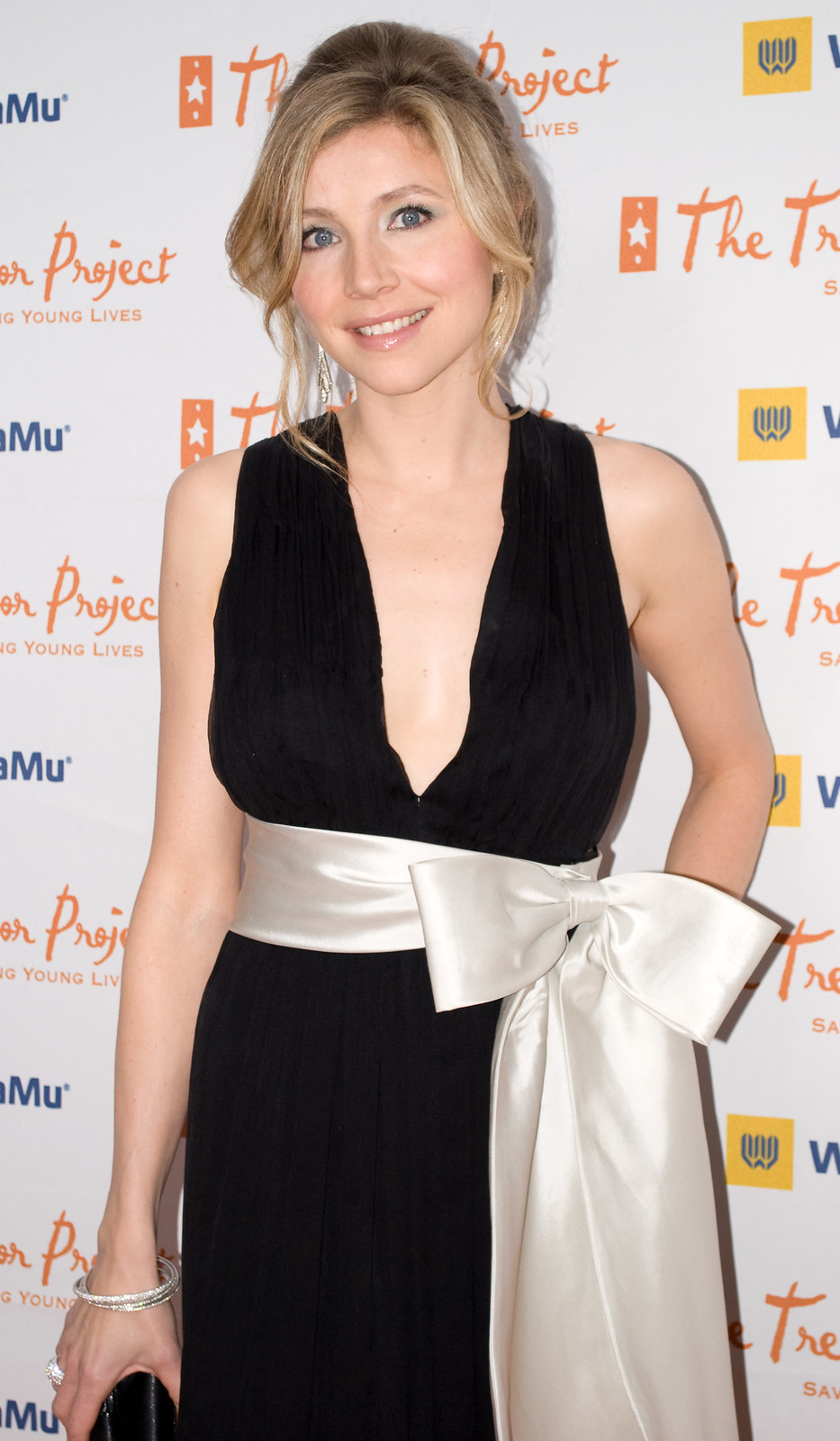
Sarah Chalke

- August 1
  - Iván Duque, Colombian politician, 33rd President of Colombia
  - Don Hertzfeldt, American animator
  - Nwankwo Kanu, Nigerian footballer
  - Hasan Şaş, Turkish football player and coach
  - Amar Upadhyay, Indian television actor and model
- August 2
  - Sam Worthington, English-Australian actor and producer
  - Kati Wilhelm, German biathlete
  - Pritam Singh, Singaporean lawyer and politician
- August 4
  - Paul Goldstein, American tennis player
- August 5 – Napoleon Beazley, juvenile offender (d. 2002)
- August 6
  - Andero Ermel, Estonian actor
  - Soleil Moon Frye, American actress, director and screenwriter
  - Melissa George, Australian actress
  - Travis Kalanick, American businessman and computer programmer; co-founder of Uber
- August 8 – JC Chasez, American singer ('N Sync)
- August 9
  - Jessica Capshaw, American actress
  - Audrey Tautou, French actress
- August 11
  - Iván Córdoba, Colombian football player and manager
  - Will Friedle, American actor, voice actor, writer and comedian
  - Jhong Hilario, Filipino actor, dancer, television host, and politician
- August 12
  - Mikko Lindström, Finnish rock guitarist
  - Lina Rafn, Danish singer
- August 14 – Maya Nasri, Lebanese actress and singer
- August 15
  - Abiy Ahmed, Ethiopian Prime Minister, recipient of the Nobel Peace Prize
  - Boudewijn Zenden, Dutch football player
- August 18
  - Lee Seung-yeop, South Korean baseball player
  - Bryan Volpenhein, American rower
- August 21 – Liezel Huber, South African born-American tennis player
- August 25 – Alexander Skarsgård, Swedish actor
- August 27
  - Sarah Chalke, Canadian actress
  - Carlos Moyá, Spanish tennis player
  - Mark Webber, Australian racing driver
- August 29
  - Luana Piovani, Brazilian actress and model
  - Jon Dahl Tomasson, Danish footballer
- August 30 – Cristian Gonzáles, Uruguayan-born Indonesian footballer
- August 31 – Roque Júnior, Brazilian footballer

=== September ===
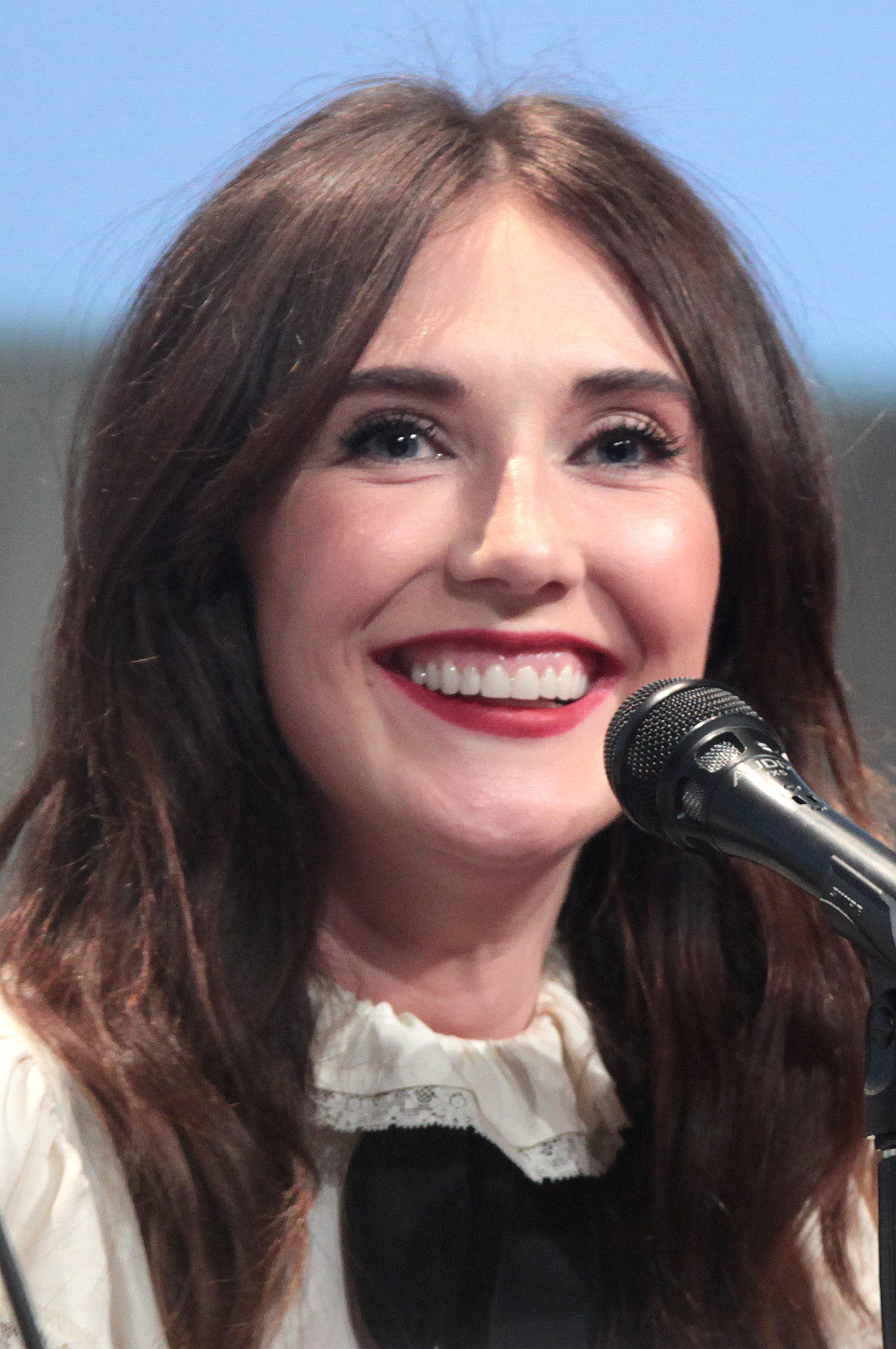
Carice van Houten

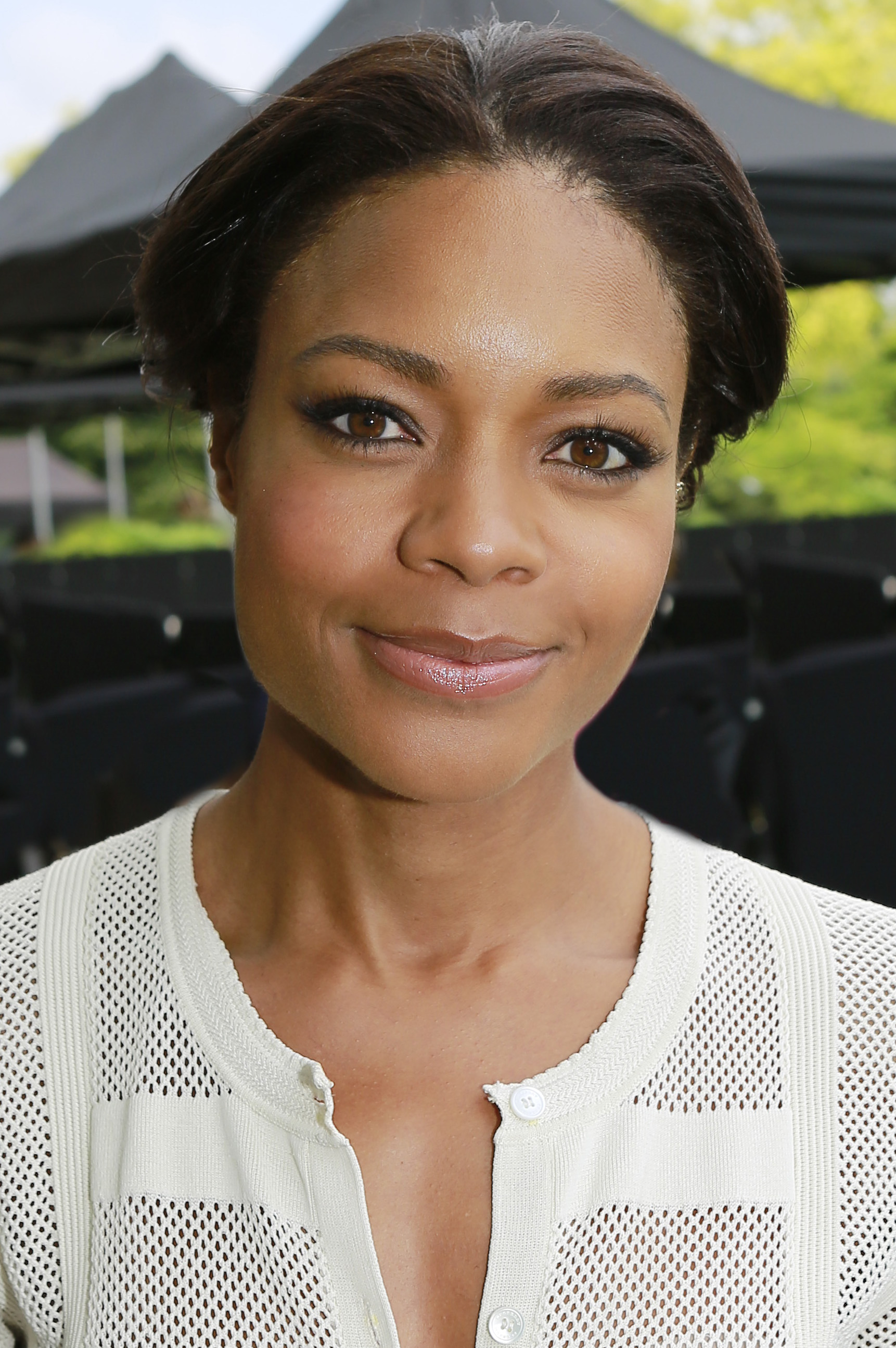
Naomie Harris

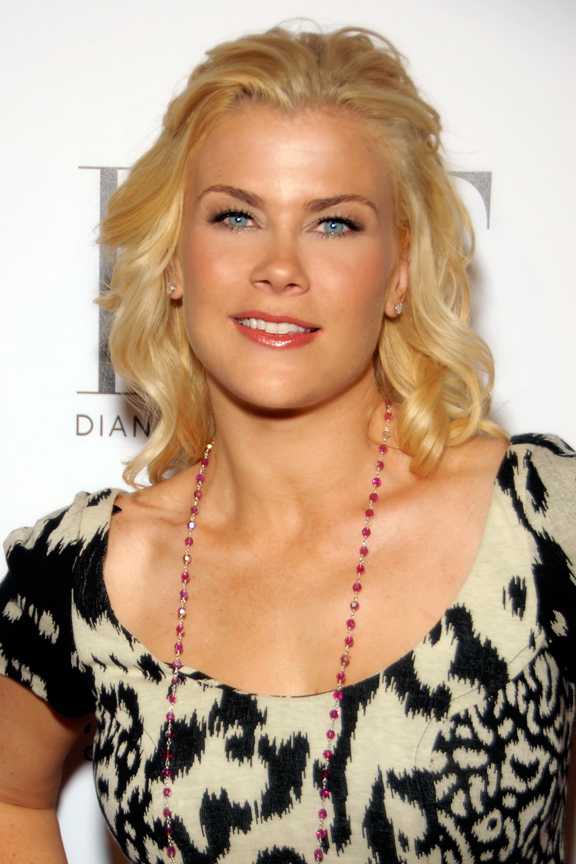
Alison Sweeney

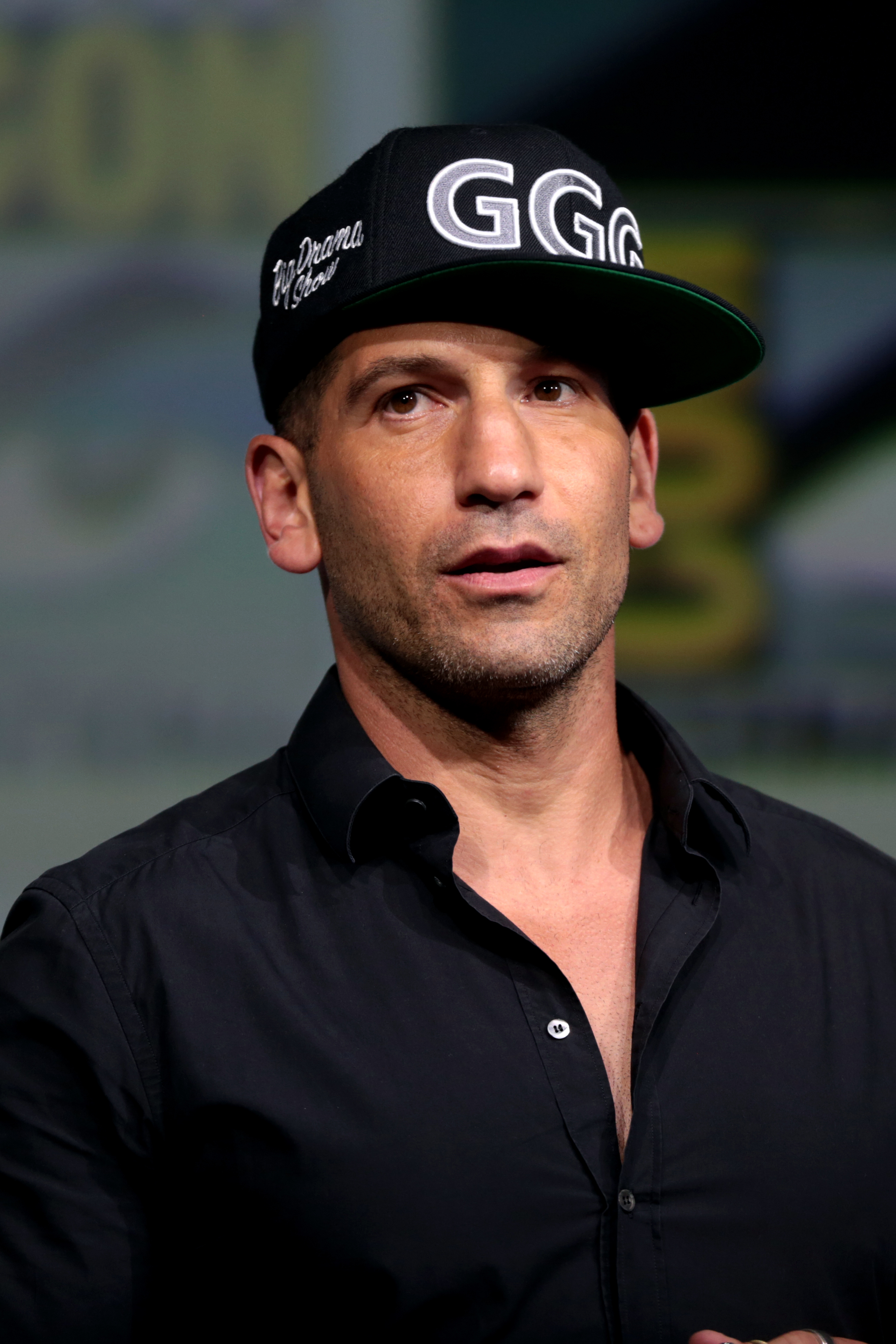
Jon Bernthal

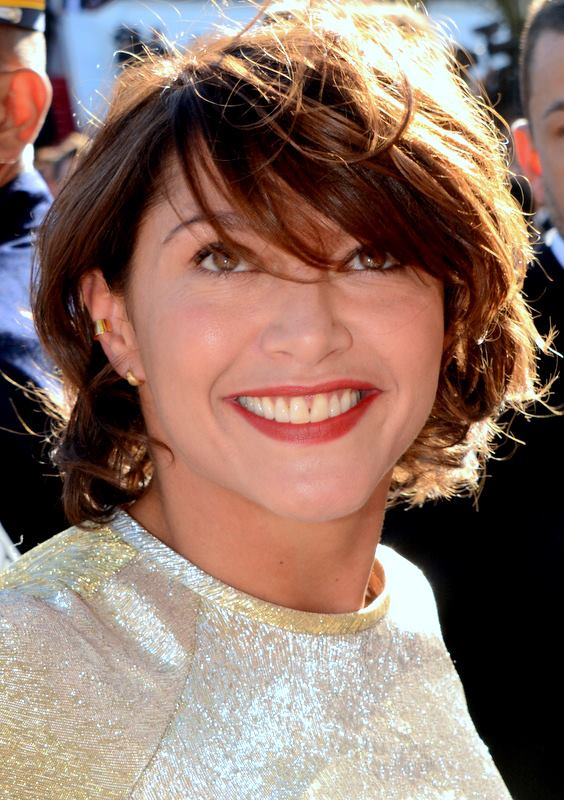
Emma de Caunes

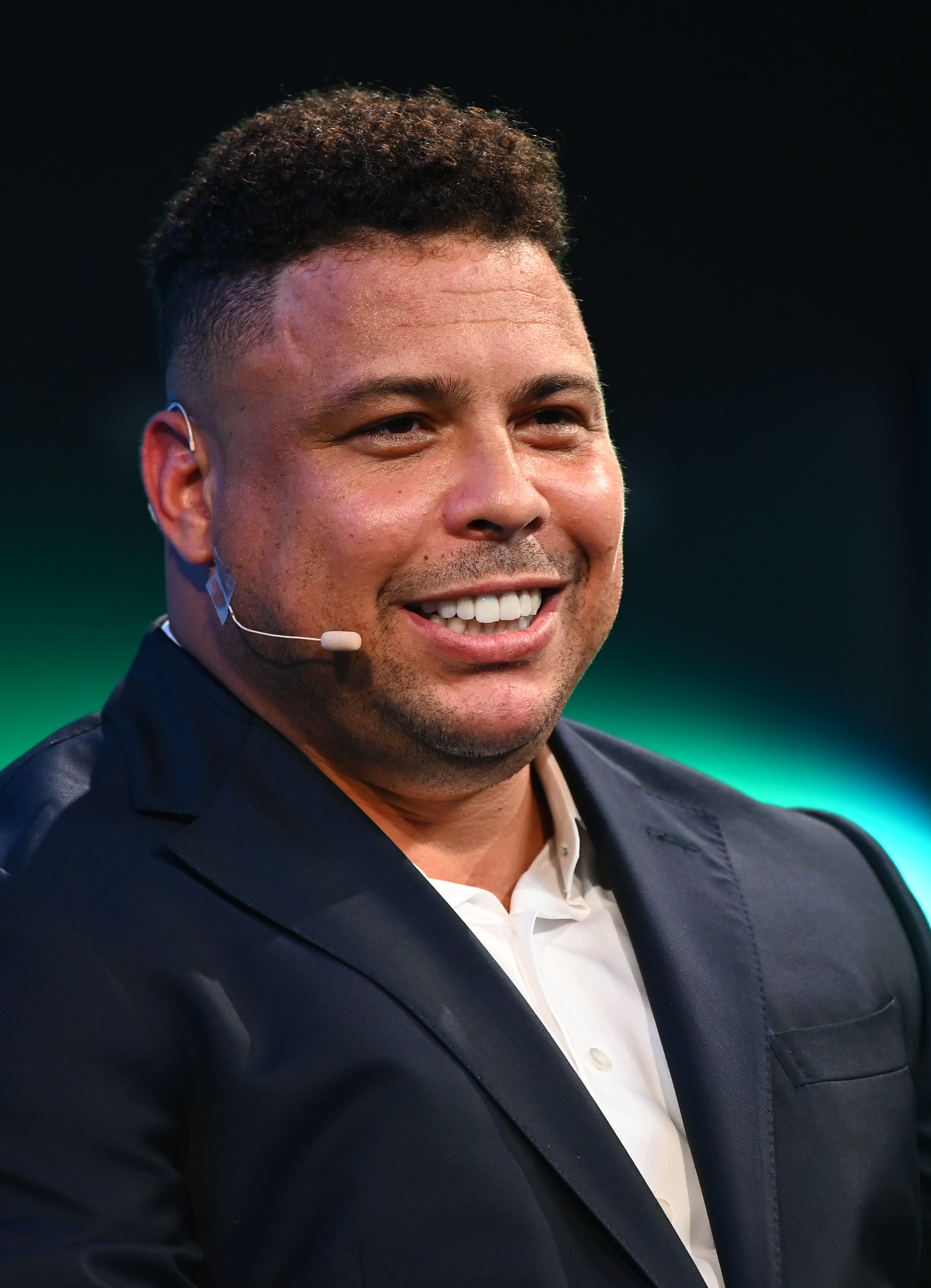
Ronaldo

- September 1
  - Marcos Ambrose, Australian racing driver
  - Ivano Brugnetti, Italian race walker
  - Sebastián Rozental, Chilean footballer
- September 3
  - Jevon Kearse, American football player
  - Samuel Kuffour, Ghanaian footballer
  - Vivek Oberoi, Indian actor
- September 4 – Brian Myrow, American baseball player
- September 5 – Carice van Houten, Dutch actress
- September 6
  - Naomie Harris, British actress
  - Mark Wilkerson, American musician
  - Robin Atkin Downes, English actor and voice actor
- September 7 – Stevie Case, American video game celebrity
- September 8 – Sjeng Schalken, Dutch tennis player
- September 9
  - Mick Blue, Austrian pornographic actor and director
  - Emma de Caunes, French actress
  - Lúcia Moniz, Portuguese singer and actress
- September 10 – Gustavo Kuerten, Brazilian tennis player
- September 11 – Marco Rose, German football player and coach
- September 12 – Maciej Żurawski, Polish footballer
- September 13 – Puma Swede, Swedish pornographic actress
- September 15 – Rob Wiethoff, American actor
- September 16 – Tina Barrett, English singer (S Club 7)
- September 17 – Nicole Reinhart, American track and road racing cyclist (d. 2000)
- September 18 – Ronaldo, Brazilian footballer
- September 19
  - Raja Bell, American basketball player
  - Isha Koppikar, Indian actress
  - Alison Sweeney, American actress
  - Sergey Tsinkevich, Belarusian footballer and referee
- September 20
  - Jon Bernthal, American actor
  - Yui Horie, Japanese voice actress
  - Enuka Okuma, Canadian actress
- September 23 – Rob James-Collier, British actor and model
- September 24 – Stephanie McMahon-Levesque, American professional wrestling promoter
- September 25
  - Chauncey Billups, American basketball player
  - Chiara Siracusa, Maltese singer, Eurovision Song Contest 2005 runner-up
- September 26
  - Michael Ballack, German footballer
  - Kersti Heinloo, Estonian actress
- September 27 – Francesco Totti, Italian footballer
- September 28 – Fedor Emelianenko, Russian mixed martial arts fighter
- September 29 – Andriy Shevchenko, Ukrainian footballer

=== October ===
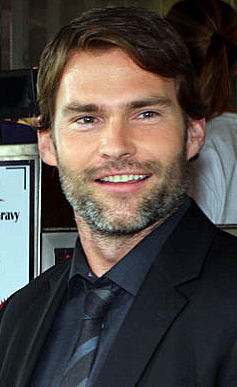
Seann William Scott

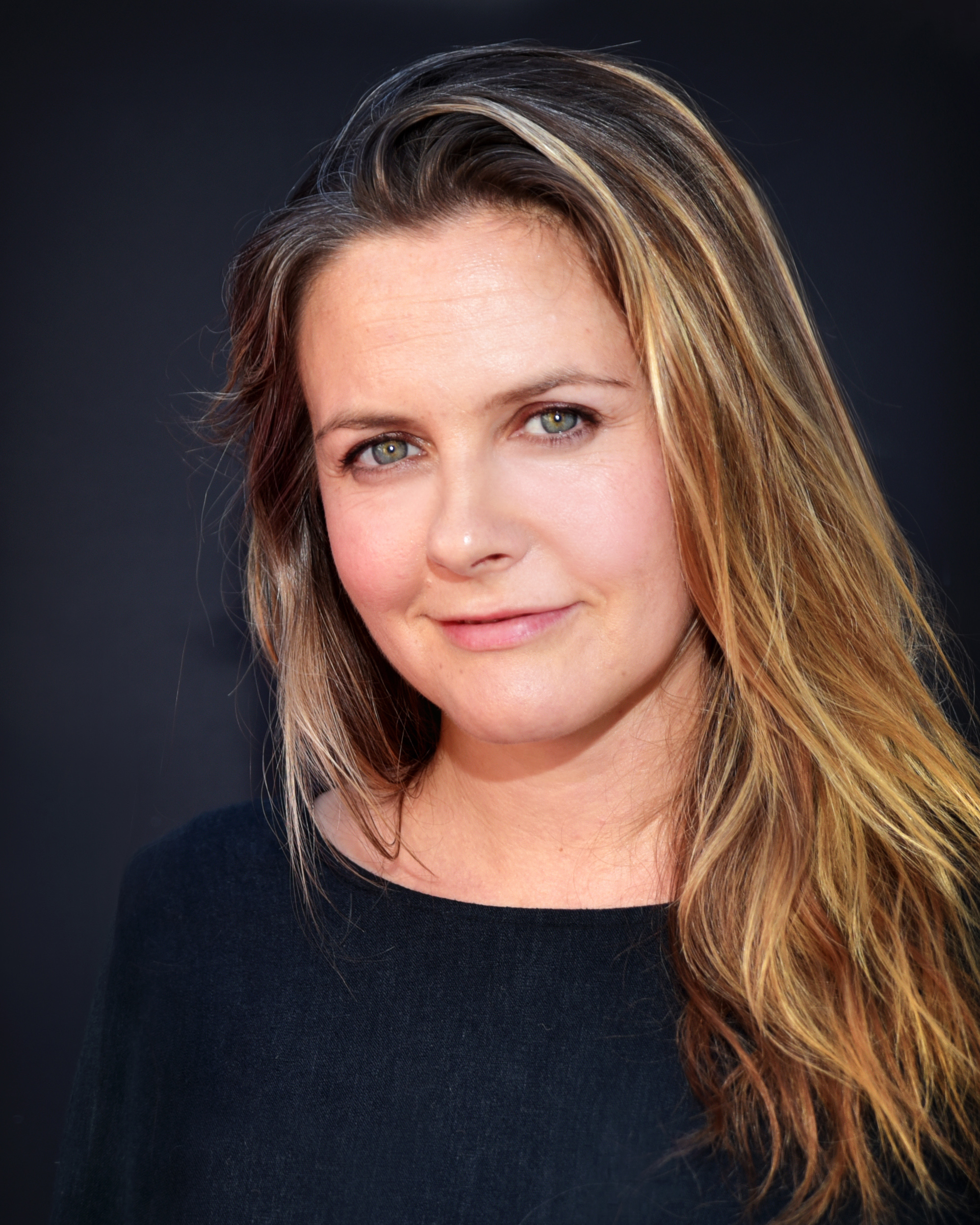
Alicia Silverstone

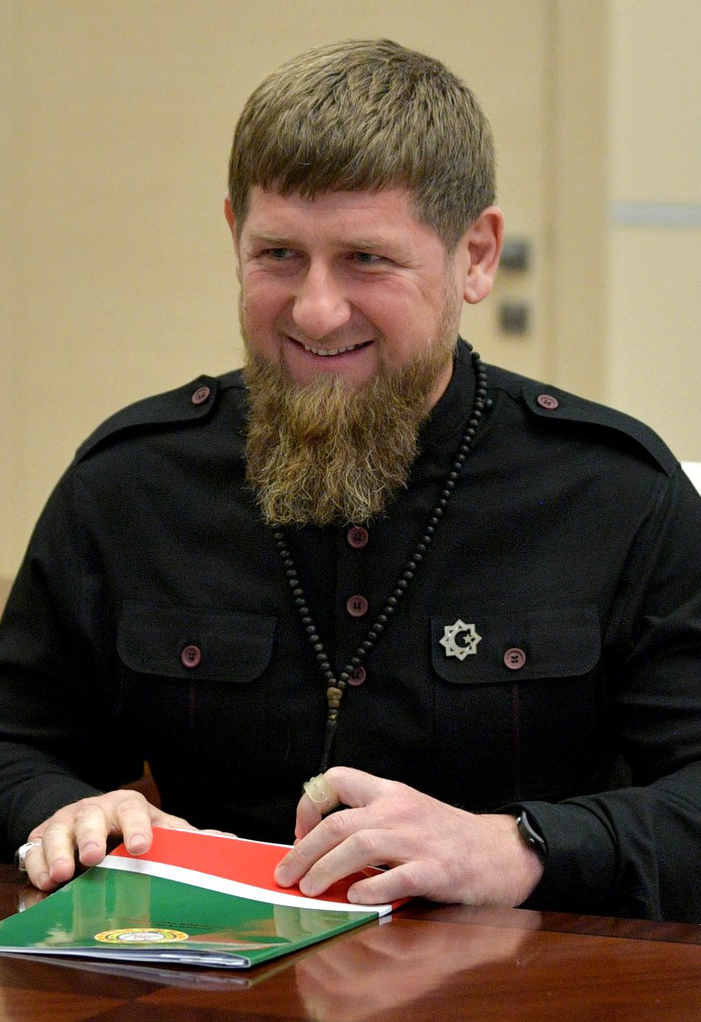
Ramzan Kadyrov

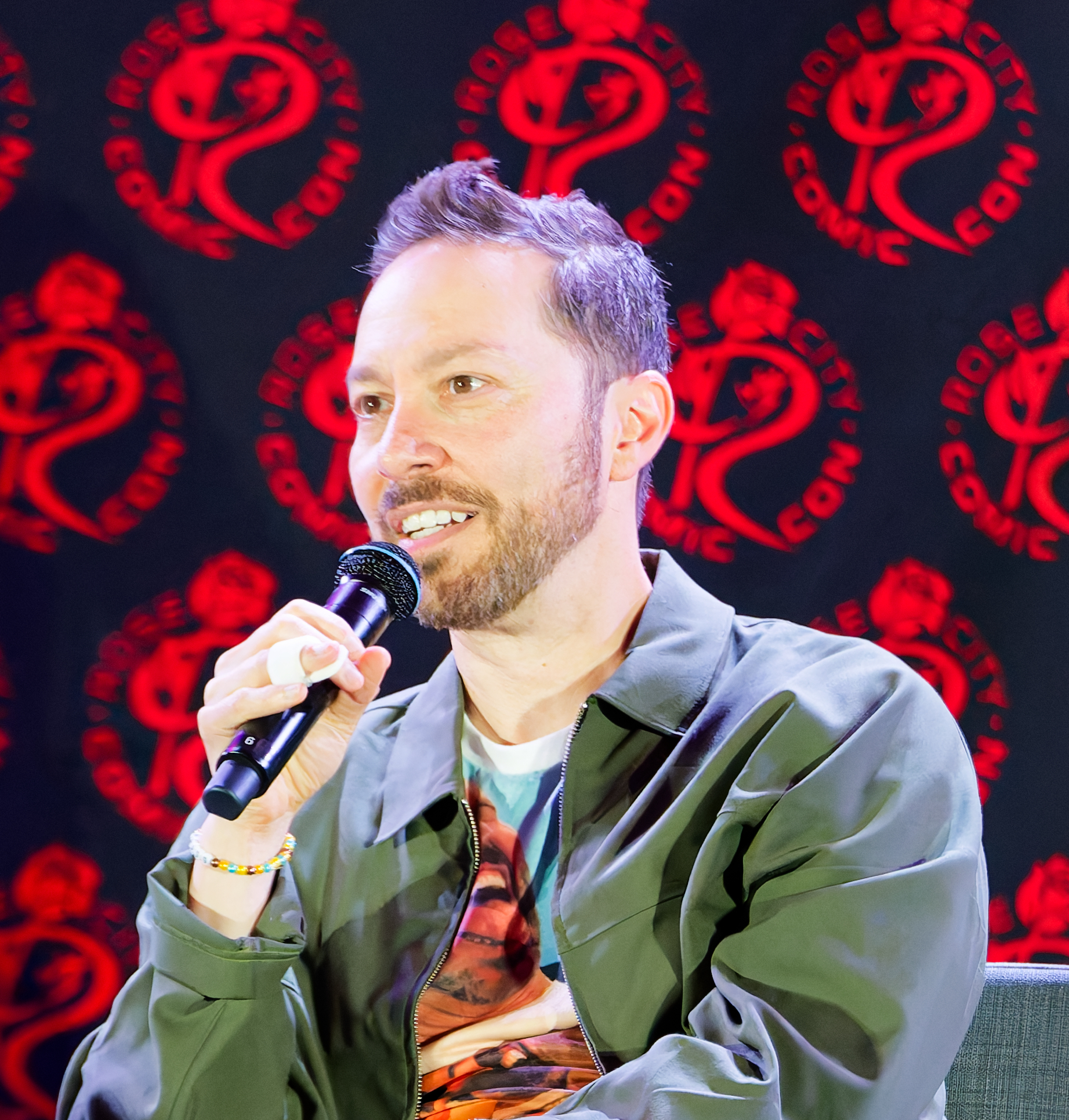
Sam Riegel

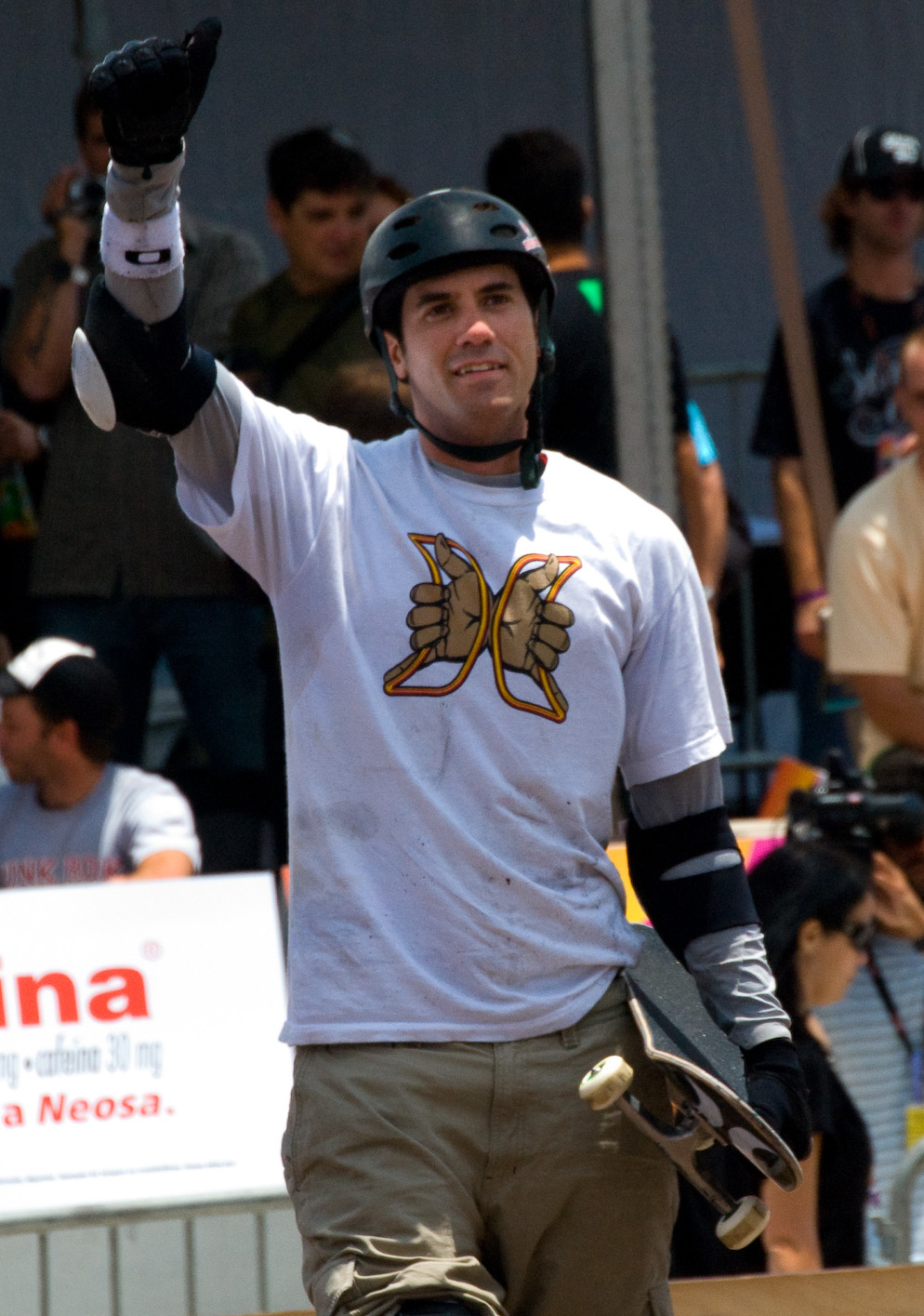
Bob Burnquist

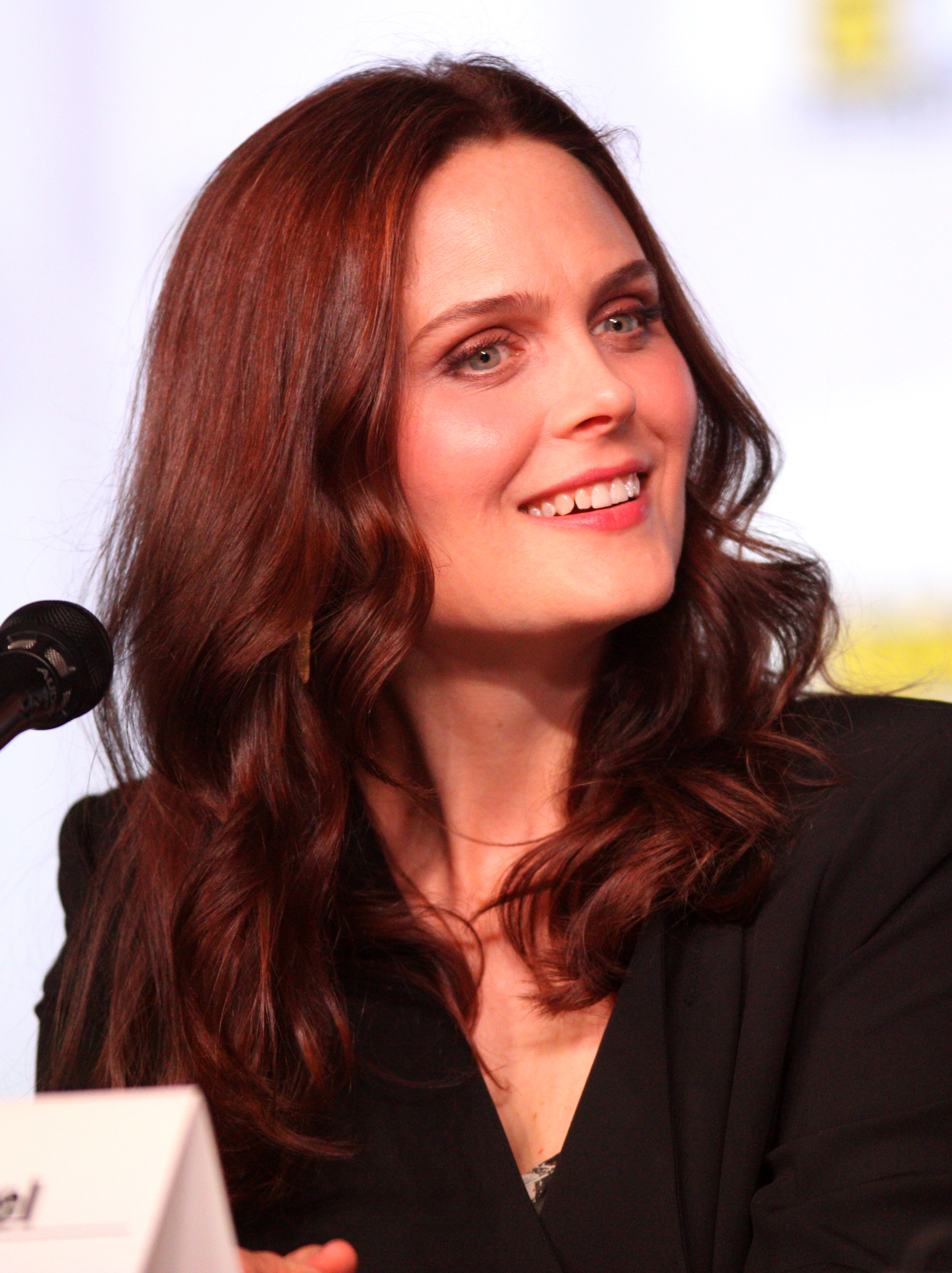
Emily Deschanel

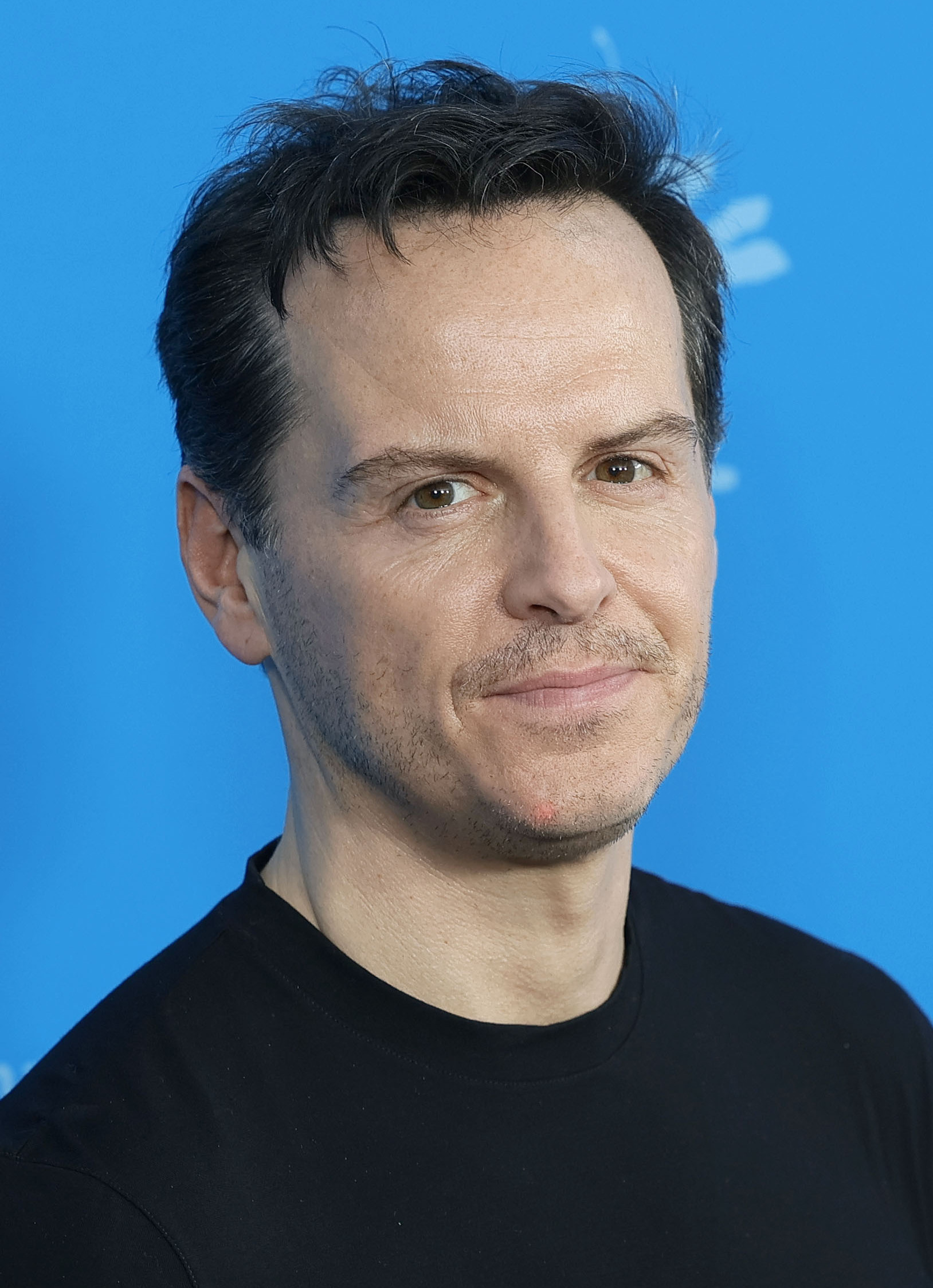
Andrew Scott

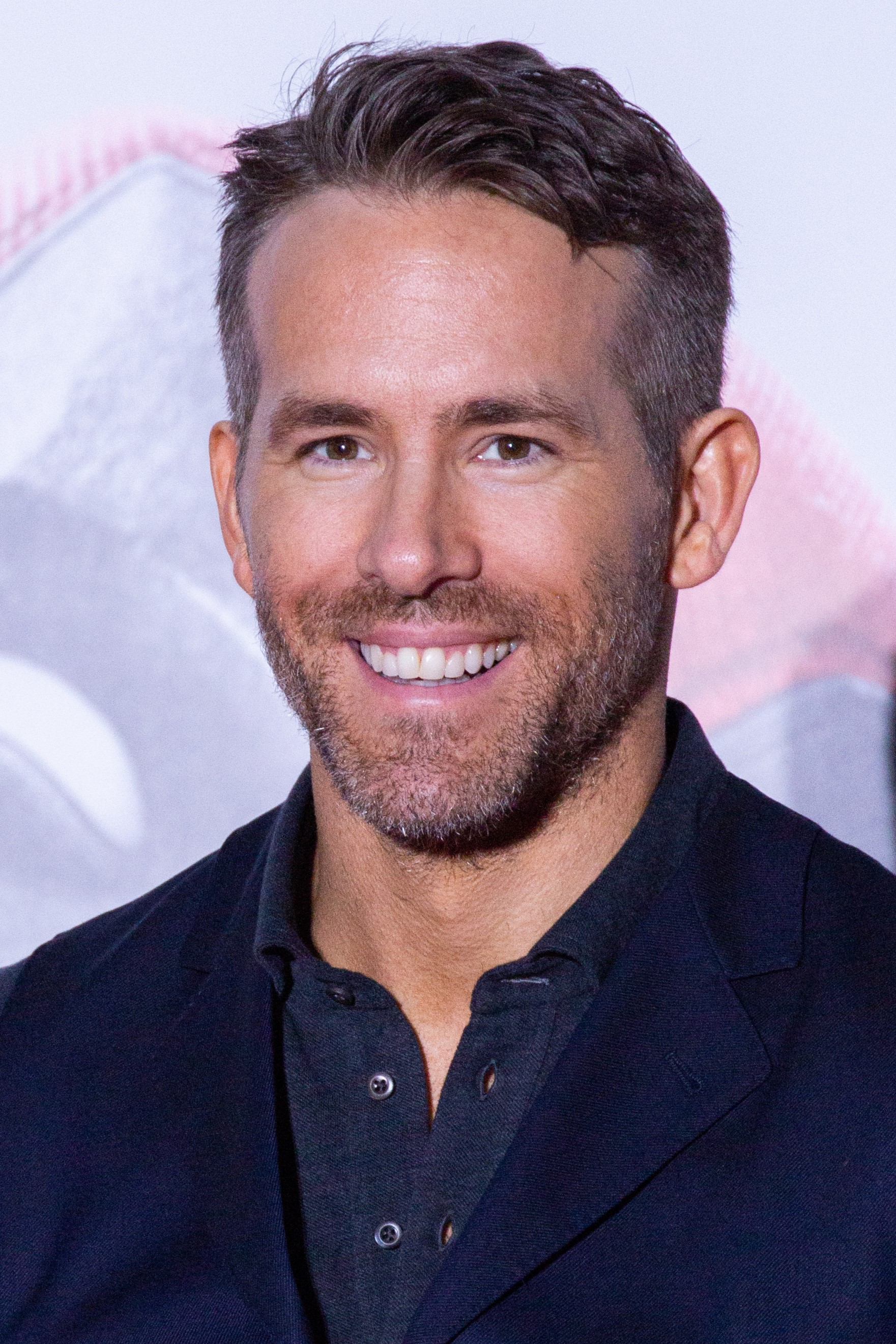
Ryan Reynolds

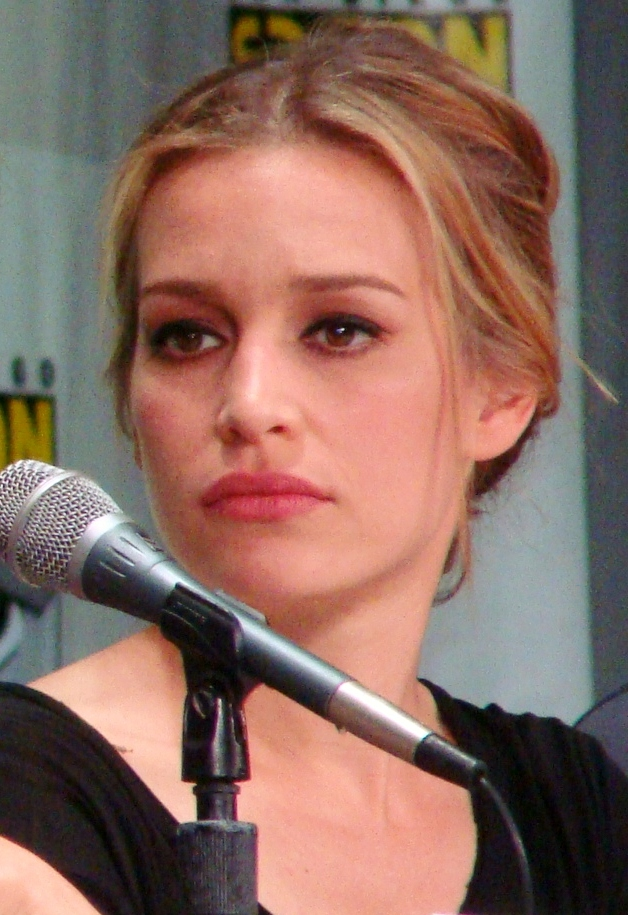
Piper Perabo

- October 1 – Danielle Bisutti, American actress and singer
- October 2
  - Anita Kulcsár, Hungarian handball player (d. 2005)
  - Mandisa, American singer (d. 2024)
- October 3 – Seann William Scott, American actor and producer
- October 4
  - Mauro Camoranesi, Argentine born-Italian footballer
  - Alicia Silverstone, American actress
  - Ueli Steck, Swiss mountaineer (d. 2017)
- October 5
  - Ramzan Kadyrov, Head of the Chechen Republic
  - Abu Ibrahim al-Hashimi al-Qurashi, Iraqi-born leader of the Islamic state (d. 2022)
- October 6
  - Freddy García, Venezuelan baseball player
  - Barbie Hsu, Taiwanese actress and singer (d. 2025)
- October 7
  - Taylor Hicks, American singer
  - Pekka Kuusisto, Finnish violinist
  - Gilberto Silva, Brazilian football player
  - Santiago Solari, Argentine football player and coach
- October 9
  - Sam Riegel, American voice actor and director
  - Nick Swardson, American actor, stand-up comedian and screenwriter
- October 10
  - Bob Burnquist, Brazilian skateboarder
  - Shane Doan, Canadian ice hockey player
- October 11 – Emily Deschanel, American actress
- October 12 – Kajsa Bergqvist, Swedish high jumper
- October 14 – Chang Chen, Taiwanese actor
- October 15 – Yoon Son-ha, South Korean actress
- October 18 – Galder, Norwegian musician
- October 19
  - Joe Duplantier, French musician
  - Dan Smith, Canadian ice-hockey player
  - Michael Young, American baseball player
  - Desmond Harrington, American actor
  - Omar Gooding, American actor
- October 20
  - Dan Fogler, American actor, comedian and writer
  - Plamen Goranov, Bulgarian photographer, mountain climber and a Varna-based local protest leader (d. 2013)
- October 21
  - Jeremy Miller, American actor
  - Andrew Scott, Irish actor
- October 23
  - Cat Deeley, British television presenter
  - Ryan Reynolds, Canadian actor
- October 25
  - Steve Jones, Northern Irish footballer
  - Anton Sikharulidze, Russian figure skater
- October 26
  - Miikka Kiprusoff, Finnish hockey player
  - Jeremy Wotherspoon, Canadian speed skater
  - Thurop Van Orman, American animator and voice actor
- October 29
  - Stephen Craigan, Northern Irish footballer
  - Mark Sheehan, Irish guitarist (The Script) (d. 2023)
- October 31
  - Guti, Spanish football player and coach
  - Piper Perabo, American actress

=== November ===
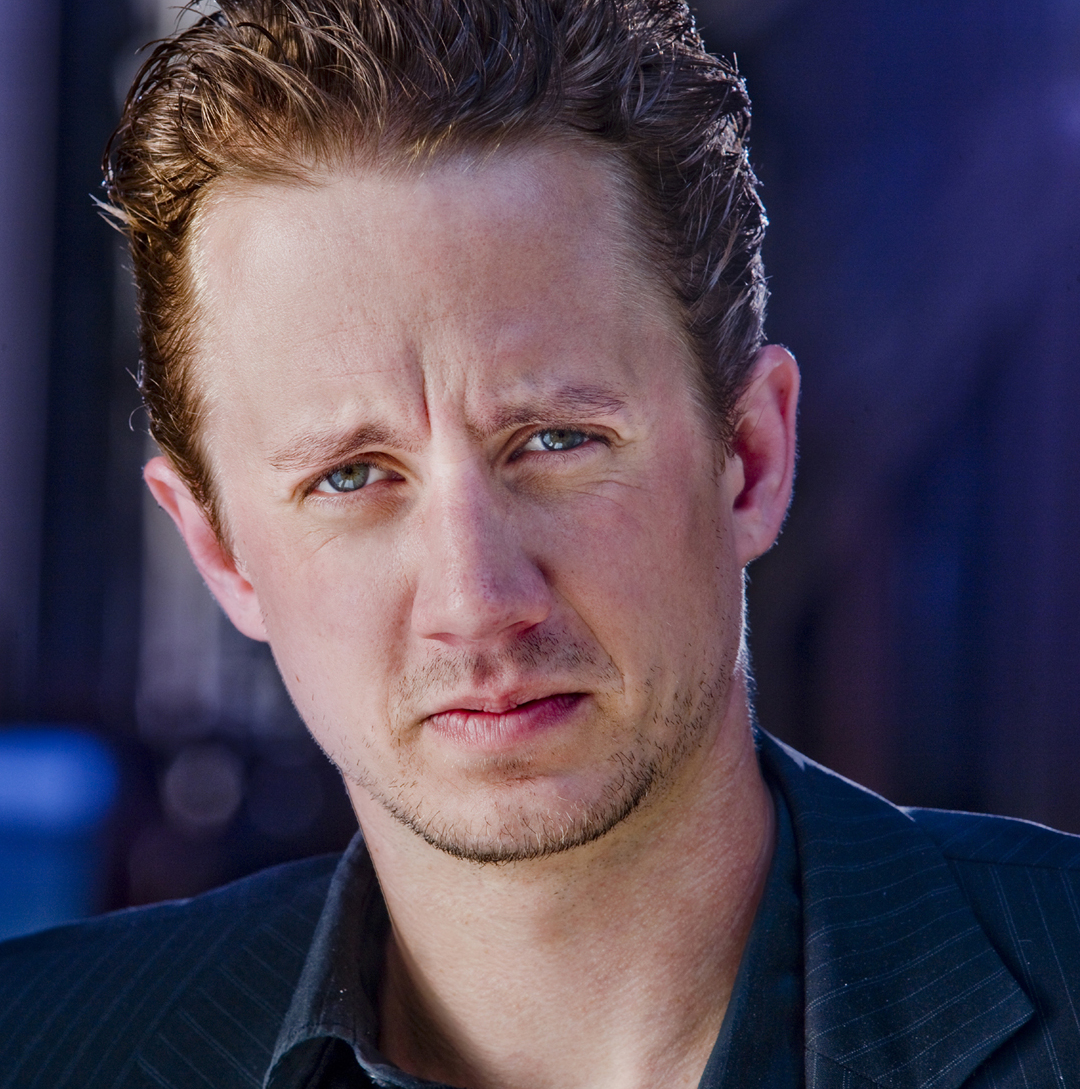
Chad Lindberg

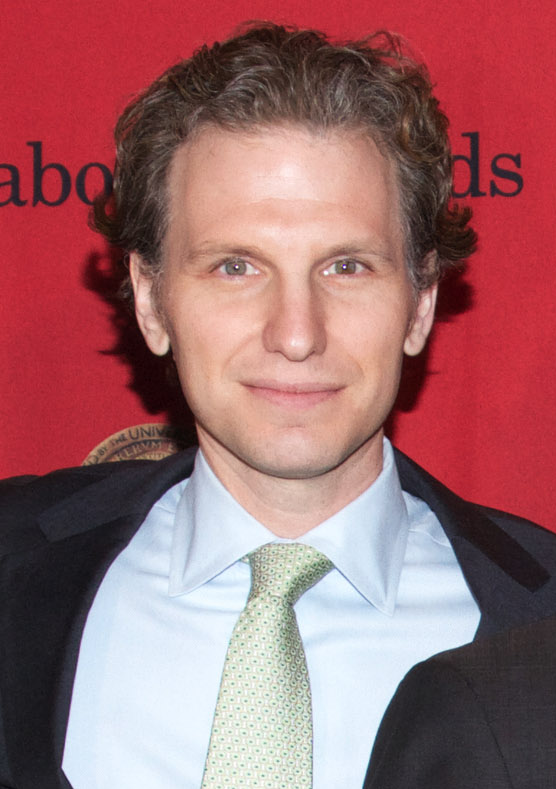
Sebastian Arcelus

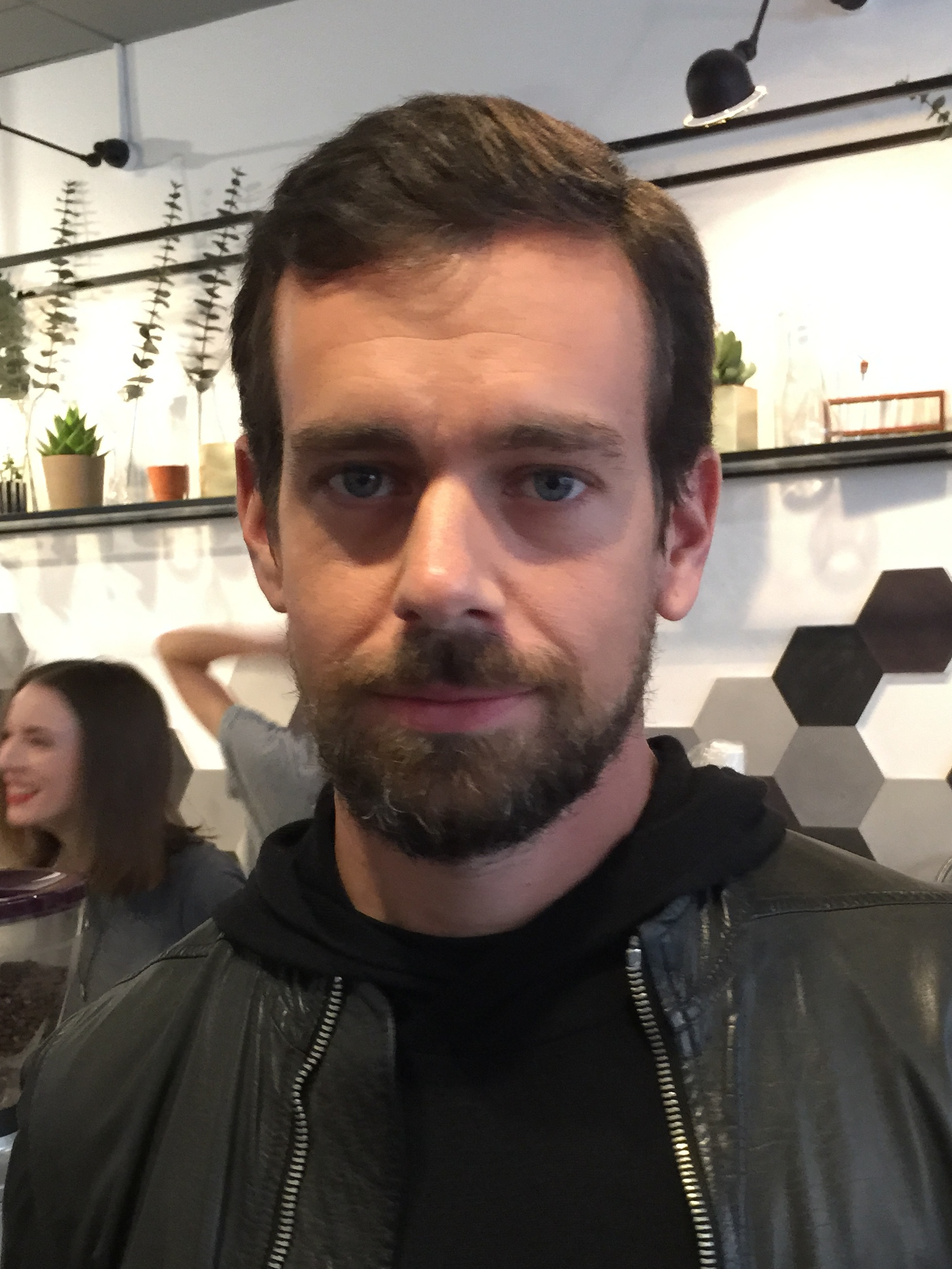
Jack Dorsey

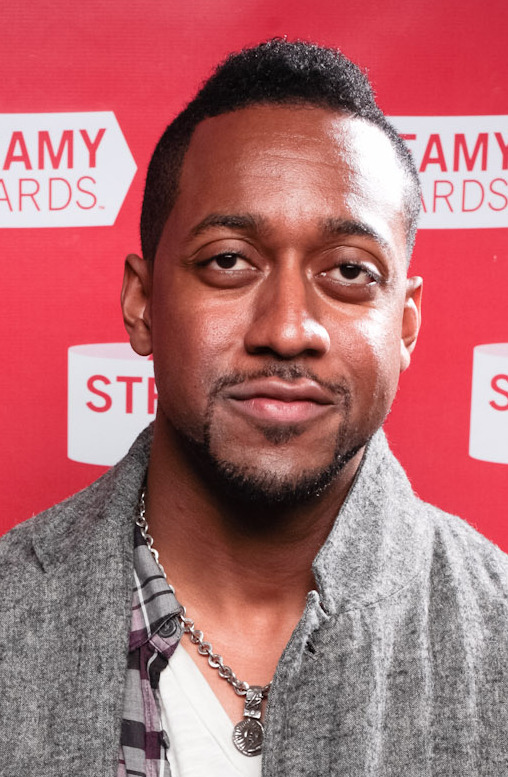
Jaleel White

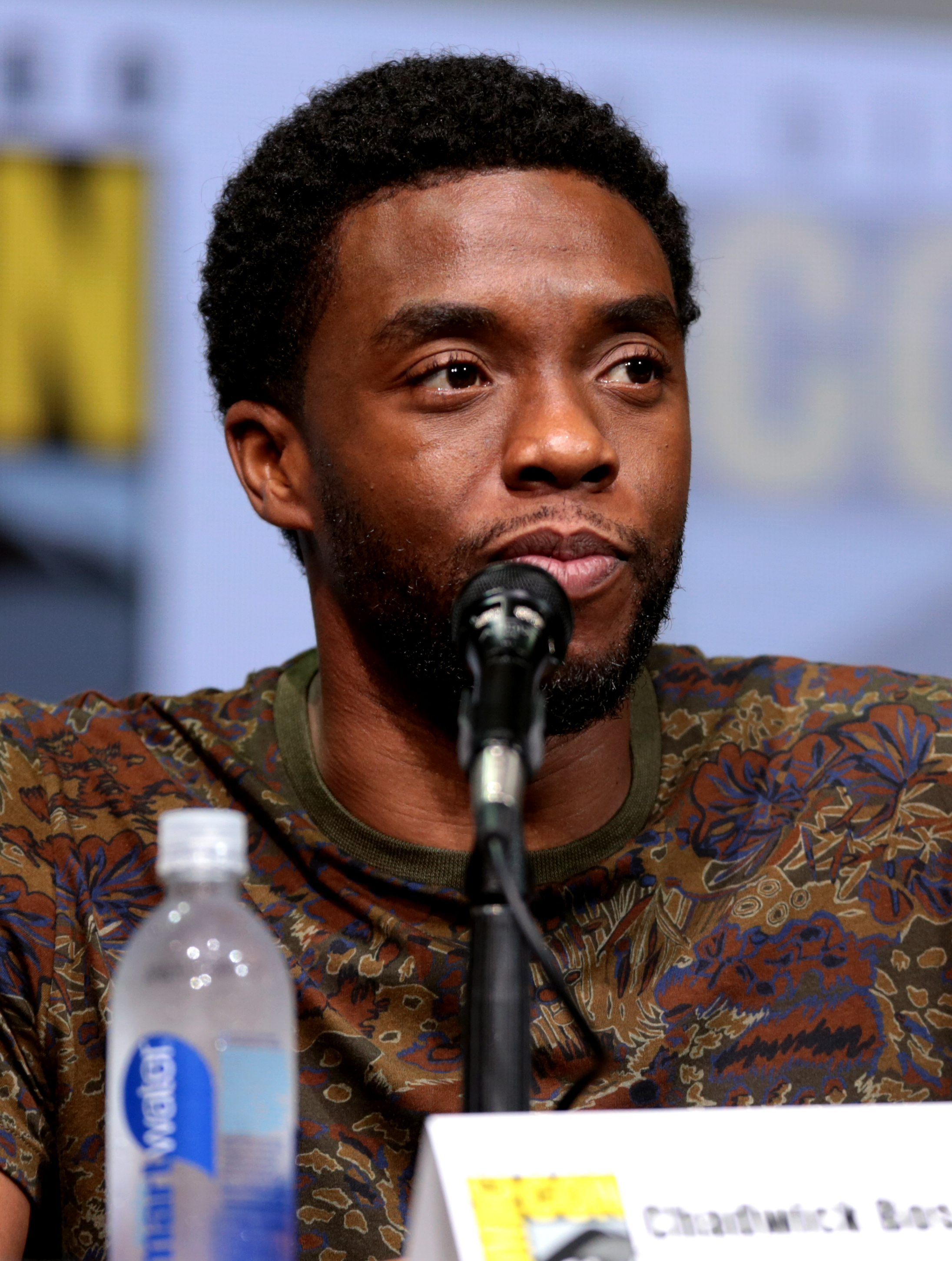
Chadwick Boseman

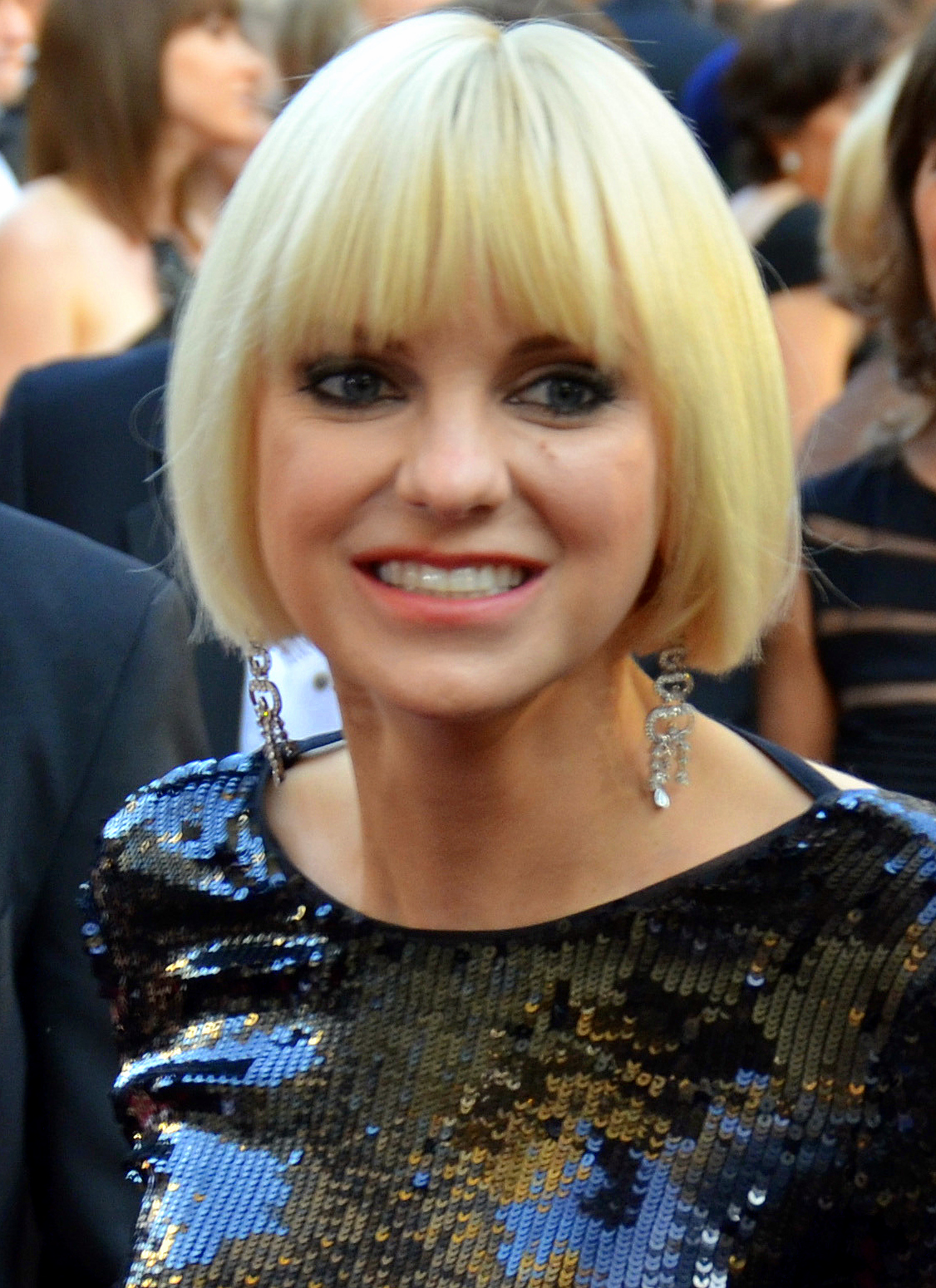
Anna Faris

- November 1
  - Chad Lindberg, American actor
  - Sam Presti, American basketball executive, general manager of the NBA's Oklahoma City Thunder since 2007
- November 2 – Thierry Omeyer, French handball goalkeeper
- November 5
  - Oleh Shelayev, Ukrainian footballer
  - Sean Brown, Canadian ice-hockey player
  - Sebastian Arcelus, American actor
- November 6
  - Pat Tillman, American football player, victim of friendly fire (d. 2004)
  - Troy Hambrick, American football player
  - Wiley Wiggins, American actor
- November 7 – Mark Philippoussis, Australian tennis player
- November 8 – Brett Lee, Australian cricketer
- November 9
  - Josh Kaufman, American singer-songwriter, winner of The Voice season 6
  - Federica De Bortoli, Italian voice actress
- November 11 – Mike Leon Grosch, German singer
- November 12
  - Tevin Campbell, American singer and actor
  - Mirosław Szymkowiak, Polish footballer
- November 13 – Janine Leal, Venezuelan nutritionist, television presenter and model.
- November 15 – Virginie Ledoyen, French actress
- November 17 – Diane Neal, American actress
- November 18 – Shagrath, Norwegian black metal musician (Dimmu Borgir)
- November 19
  - Jack Dorsey, American software architect, businessman, co-founder of Twitter
  - Benny Vansteelant, Belgian duathlete (d. 2007)
- November 20
  - Dominique Dawes, African-American Olympic gymnast
  - Ji Yun-nam, North Korean footballer
  - Laura Harris, Canadian actress
- November 22
  - Torsten Frings, German footballer
  - Ville Valo, Finnish rock singer (HIM)
- November 24
  - Chen Lu, Chinese figure skater
  - Christian Laflamme, Canadian ice-hockey player
- November 25
  - Donovan McNabb, American football player
  - Hienadz Shutau, Belarusian demonstrator (d. 2020)
- November 26 – Maia Campbell, American actress and singer
- November 27 – Jaleel White, African-American actor
- November 28 – Ryan Kwanten, Australian actor and comedian
- November 29
  - Chadwick Boseman, American actor and playwright (d. 2020)
  - Anna Faris, American actress
  - Ehren McGhehey, American stunt performer and actor

=== December ===
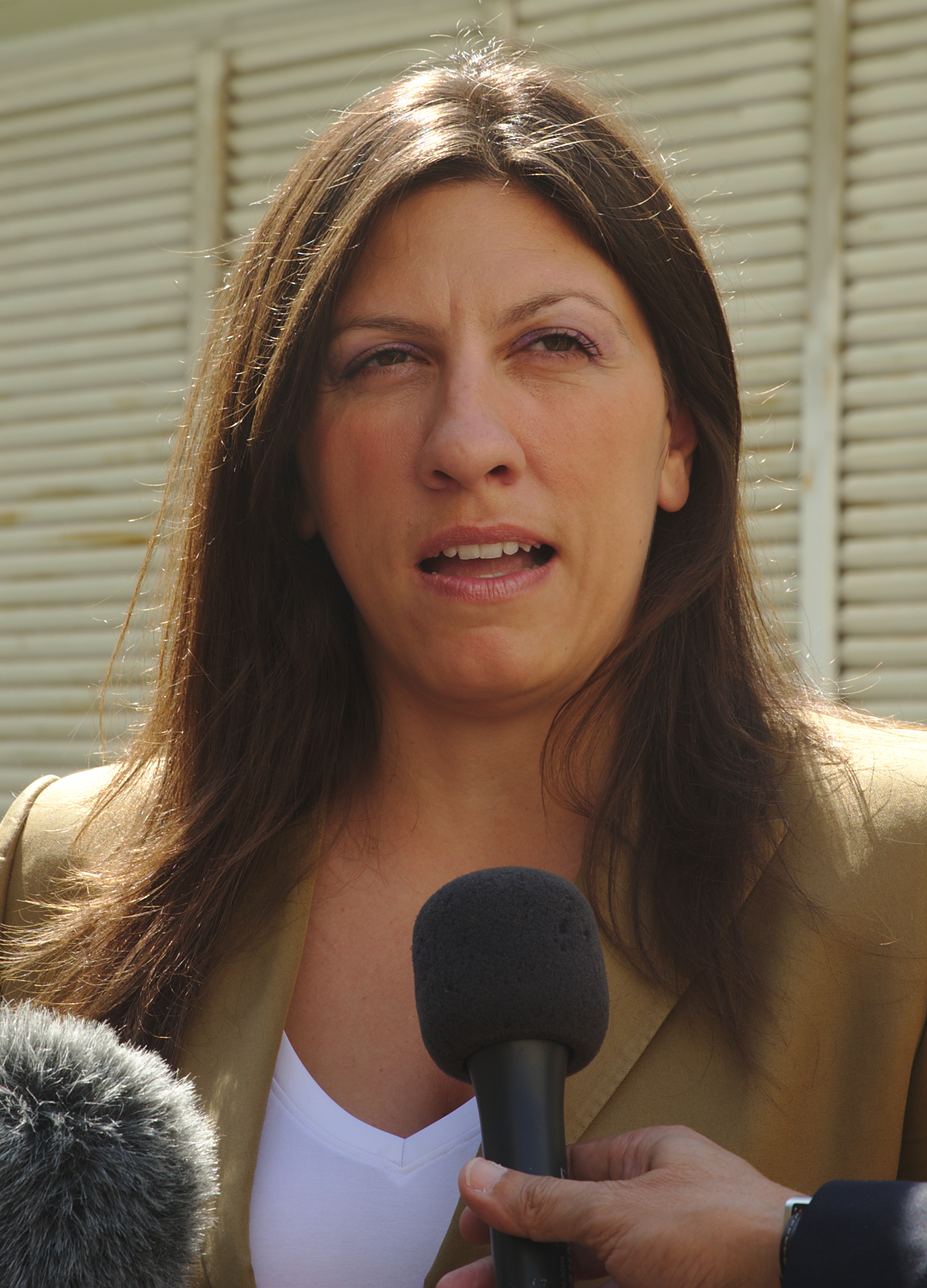
Zoe Konstantopoulou

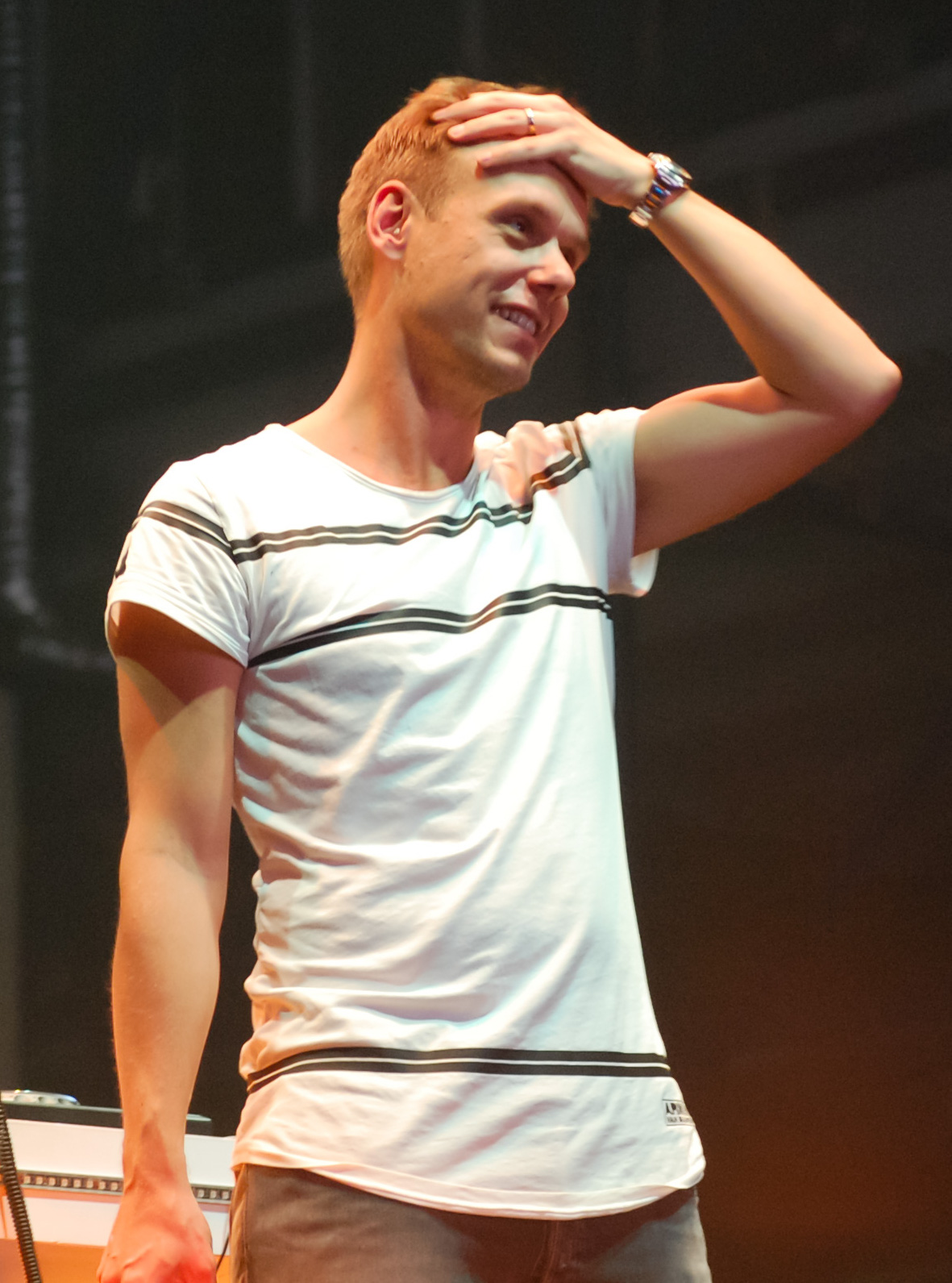
Armin van Buuren

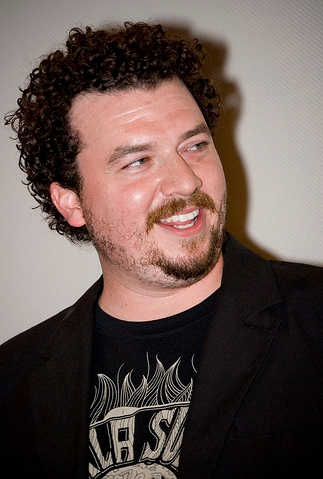
Danny McBride

- December 1
  - Matthew Shepard, American murder victim (d. 1998)
  - Laura Ling, American journalist imprisoned by North Korea in 2009
- December 3
  - Cornelius Griffin, American football player
  - Marcos Denner, Brazilian footballer
- December 4 – Amie Comeaux, American country music singer (d. 1997)
- December 5
  - Amy Acker, American actress
  - Rafaela Crespín Rubio, Spanish politician
  - Evonne Hsu, Taiwanese singer
- December 6 – Alicia Machado, Venezuelan beauty queen, Miss Universe 1996
- December 7
  - Mark Duplass, American actor, screenwriter and director
  - Georges Laraque, Canadian ice-hockey player
  - Derek Ramsay, Filipino actor and model
- December 8
  - Zoe Konstantopoulou, Greek lawyer and politician
  - Dominic Monaghan, English-German actor
- December 13
  - Mark Paston, New Zealand footballer
  - Radosław Sobolewski, Polish footballer
- December 14 – Leland Chapman, American bail bondsman
- December 16 – Osamu Sato, Japanese former professional boxer
- December 17
  - Takeo Spikes, American football player
  - Dan Hageman, American screenwriter and television producer
- December 18
  - Koyuki, Japanese actress
- December 21 – Mirela Maniani, Greek javelin thrower
- December 23
  - Jamie Noble, American professional wrestler
  - Amjad Sabri, Pakistani Qawwali singer (d. 2016)
  - Christopher Pizzey, English actor and comedian
- December 24 – Ángel Matos, Cuban taekwondo athlete
- December 25
  - Tuomas Holopainen, Finnish metal keyboardist (Nightwish)
  - Armin van Buuren, Dutch music producer and DJ
- December 26
  - Nadia Litz, Canadian actress and producer
  - Dmitri Tertyshny, Russian professional ice hockey (d. 1999)
- December 27 – Fernando Pisani, Canadian ice-hockey player
- December 28 – Joe Manganiello, American actor
- December 29 – Danny McBride, American actor, comedian and writer

=== Date unknown ===
- Pedro X. Molina, Nicaraguan caricaturist

== Nobel Prizes ==

- Physics – Burton Richter, Samuel Chao Chung Ting
- Chemistry – William Nunn Lipscomb Jr
- Physiology or Medicine – Baruch S. Blumberg, D Carleton Gajdusek
- Literature – Saul Bellow
- Peace – Betty Williams and Mairead Corrigan
- Economics – Milton Friedman

== See also ==
- 1976 in the environment
