= Battle of Amgala =

The Battle of Amgala may refer to:

- First Battle of Amgala (1976)
- Battle of Amgala (1989)
