= January 1976 =

Month of 1976

<<	January 1976					>>
Su	Mo	Tu	We	Th	Fr	Sa
				1	2	3
4	5	6	7	8	9	10
11	12	13	14	15	16	17
18	19	20	21	22	23	24
25	26	27	28	29	30	31

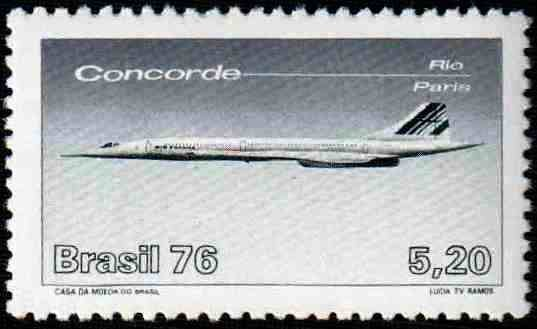
January 21, 1976: Air France begins commercial service of the supersonic Concorde with flight from Paris to Rio de Janeiro...

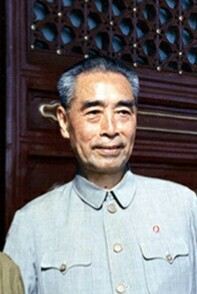
January 8, 1976: China's Premier, Zhou Enlai, died after 26 years in office

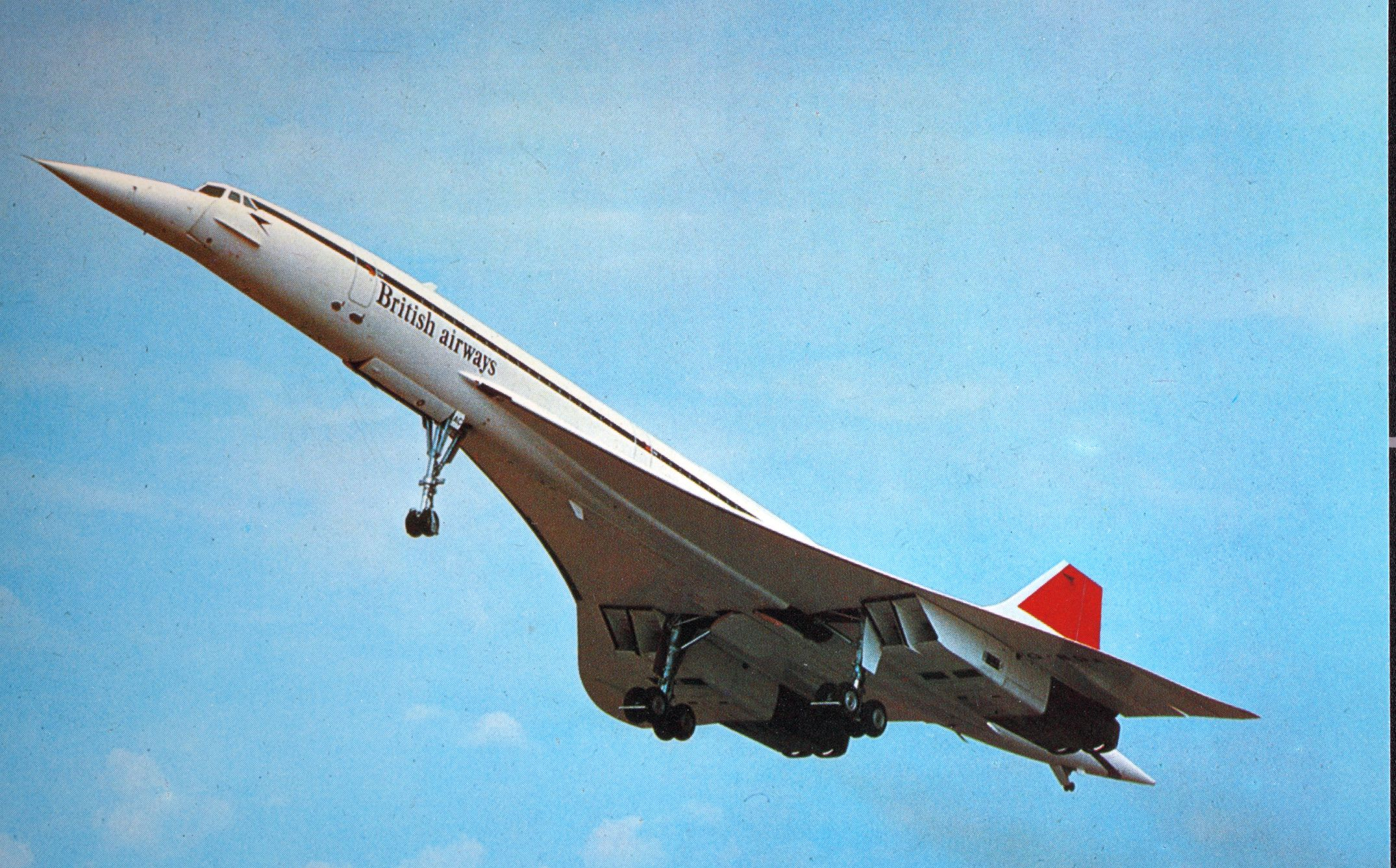
...British Airways Concorde takes off at the same time from London to fly to Dubai

The following events occurred in January 1976:

== January 1, 1976 (Thursday) ==
- A bomb exploded in the forward cargo compartment of Middle East Airlines Flight 438, a Boeing 720-023B airliner. The Lebanese jet was at an altitude of 37,000 feet (11,000 meters) over Saudi Arabia when the blast happened, and crashed northwest of Al Qaysumah, killing all 81 people on board. Nearly 50 years later, responsibility for the bombing has never been established.
- Venezuela took formal possession of its oil industry, nationalizing the operations of 30 foreign oil companies, including Exxon, Gulf and Mobil, as part of the state-owned oil company Petróleos de Venezuela, S.A. (PDVSA).
- The Australian Defence Force came into existence with the merger under a unified command of the Royal Australian Navy (RAN), the Australian Army and the Royal Australian Air Force (RAAF).
- Ontario became the first Canadian province (and one of the first sub-national governmental units in the world) to require the mandatory use of seat belts.
- The British colony Tuvalu, formerly the Ellice Islands, obtained its own government after having been established on October 1, 1975, when the Gilbert and Ellice Islands Colony was dissolved.
- A fire and subsequent panic killed 15 partygoers at the Six-Neuf Club in the Belgium city of La Louviere. After ringing in the year 1976, the crowd was celebrating when the electricity failed in the club. One of the people present used a cigarette lighter to see in the dark and accidentally set plastic holiday decorations on fire.
- The #1-ranked team in college football, the undefeated (11-0-0) Ohio State Buckeyes, was upset by the #11 UCLA Bruins, 23 to 10, in the Rose Bowl in the afternoon. The loss, coming more than a week after #2-ranked Texas A&M had lost its two final games of the season, placed the #3-ranked Oklahoma Sooners in position to win the unofficial NCAA championship if they could beat the #5 Michigan Wolverines in the Orange Bowl that evening. The Sooners won, 14 to 6, and were voted #1 by both the AP writers' poll and the UPI coaches' poll the next day.
- Shortly after the new year began, the Liberty Bell was moved to a new location after 223 years at Philadelphia's Independence Hall. The temporary relocation was made to a pavilion 100 yards (91 m) from the Hall, deemed too small to handle tourists who would come for the U.S. bicentennial celebration.
- Born: Tank (stage name for Durrell Babbs), American R&B and rap singer; in Milwaukee, Wisconsin

== January 2, 1976 (Friday) ==
- The Oklahoma Sooners were named as the unofficial college football national champions in the two "wire service" polls recognized by the NCAA. In the Associated Press poll of sportswriters, Oklahoma received 54½ of the 63 first-place voted the day after their 14 to 6 win in the Orange Bowl, and 21 of the 36 voted in the United Press International poll of coaches.
- The Overseas Citizens' Voting Rights Act was signed into law by U.S. President Gerald Ford after having been passed by Congress, primarily because of the lobbying of Andy Sundberg. Although the new law did not grant voting rights to citizens who were residents of U.S. territories (such as Puerto Rico), it did allow the citizens registered to vote in one of the 50 states of the United States to vote in federal elections while temporarily living overseas.
- The financially-ailing Denver Spurs of the World Hockey Association announced their mid-season relocation from the U.S. to Canada, hours before playing a road game against the Cincinnati Stingers. Although the team appeared in their Denver uniforms in their 2 to 1 loss, the scoreboard listed the 13-20-1 team under its new name, the Ottawa Civics. The WHA's Ottawa team would exist for only 13 days and play seven games before being disbanded by the league on January 17.
- Polskie Radio Program IV began broadcasting in Poland.
- The British Solomon Islands Protectorate was granted self-government and the office of High Commissioner for the Western Pacific was abolished.
- Sheffield Cablevision, one of five community cable television experiments authorised by the UK's Minister for Posts and Telecommunications in 1972, closed down because of lack of funds.
- Ted Marchibroda, who accomplished one of the most remarkable turnarounds in sports history by leading the Baltimore Colts to the Eastern Division title, was named United Press International American Football Conference coach of the year for 1975.

== January 3, 1976 (Saturday) ==
- All 61 people on Aeroflot Flight 2003 were killed, along with one person on the ground, when the airliner crashed shortly after takeoff from Moscow. Upon takeoff from Vnukovo Airport, the Tupolev Tu-124V entered thick clouds. At the same time, the airplane's artificial horizon instruments failed, and the crew lost its spatial orientation. Banking 95 degrees, the airliner entered a dive from an altitude of 820 feet (250 m) and impacted 7 kilometers (4.3 miles) west of the airport and crashed seconds later. In accordance with practices at the time, the Soviet Union's media did not mention the accident, and refused to confirm or deny that it had happened since only Soviet citizens were on the aircraft. The news reached the West on January 14 from "informed Soviet sources."
- Gale-force winds of up to 105 miles per hour (169 km/h) swept across Western Europe, killing 55 people including 26 in the UK, 12 in West Germany, and 17 in other nations.
- In the same storm, the East German coaster Capella sank off Schiermonnikoog, Netherlands, with its crew of 11, and the British ship Carnoustie went down with its 8-member crew.
- Born: Angelos Basinas, Greek soccer football midfielder on the national team; in Chalkida

== January 4, 1976 (Sunday) ==
- A team from the Soviet Union lost to a National Hockey League team for the first time in Super Series '76, with two Soviet teams and eight U.S. and Canadian NHL teams playing a total of eight games, as the Buffalo Sabres defeated the Wings of the Soviet Union team of Moscow, 12 to 6.
- A bus crash killed 19 people and injured 38 in South Africa. The bus ran off of the road and fell 22 feet (6.7 m) into the Umtawalumi River in the Natal province.
- Mark Edmondson defeated John Newcombe to win the Australian Open in tennis.
- The 1976 New Zealand Grand Prix was held at the Pukekohe Park Raceway and was won by Ken Smith.
- Born: August Diehl, German film actor; in West Berlin, West Germany

== January 5, 1976 (Monday) ==
- Television was introduced to South Africa for the first time in that nation's history, more than 25 years after it had been introduced in most of the industrial nations of the West, as the South African Broadcasting Corporation (SABC) began its first nationwide broadcasts. Prime Minister John Vorster, whose government had opposed TV broadcasting for years, came on the air to launch the inaugural night's offering on SATV, starting with the first part of the miniseries documentary The World at War, followed by an episode of The Bob Newhart Show. "I must confess that as a person I am not overenthusiastic about television. But I am pleasantly surprised so far with the quality of test transmission," Vorster told reporters earlier in the day. Initially, South African TV was limited to five hours in the evening from 7 p.m. to midnight, with half of the programming in English and half in Afrikaans.
- "No-fault divorce" went into effect in Australia as the Family Law Act 1975 took effect nationwide, eliminating the previous requirement that specific reasons for dissolution of the marriage had to be proven. On the first day, 200 applications for divorce were filed in the Melbourne registry office of the Family Court of Australia, and 80 were filed in Adelaide, while only 32 were filed in Sydney. The only requirement was that, after a 12-month separation, there was no reasonable prospect of reconciliation and that the marriage was irretrievably broken.
- The Pol Pot regime proclaimed a new constitution for Democratic Kampuchea, providing for a "Kampuchean People's Representative Assembly" ("KPRA") of 250 members "consisting of 150 farmers, 50 workers and 50 soldiers", and guaranteed employment for all people, with the state owning all means of production. Regarding human rights in the totalitarian regime, speech and religion were protected as long as they did not "contribute to the destruction of a democratic Kampuchea" in the opinion of the ruling government.
- In Northern Ireland, near Whitecross, terrorists massacred 10 Protestant textile workers who were being transported home on a bus at the end of the workday. Eleven people were ordered off of the bus, lined up against a wall, and shot with machine guns, in apparent retaliation for the earlier murder of five Roman Catholics by Protestants in Ulster. The South Armagh Republican Action Force took responsibility for the killing.
- The U.S. state of California assessed a $4,200,000 fine against the American Motors Corporation for violations of the state's anti-pollution laws regarding motor vehicle equipment.
- Died:
  - John A. Costello, 84, Prime Minister (Taoiseach) of the Republic of Ireland from 1948 to 1951
  - Malcolm "Mal" Evans, 40, English roadie who set up the concerts for The Beatles from 1963 until their breakup, was shot and killed by Los Angeles police after pointing an air rifle (BB gun) at them during a confrontation.
  - Károly Takács, 65, sports shooter who won two gold medals, despite a disability, at the 1948 and 1952 Olympic Games

== January 6, 1976 (Tuesday) ==
- The popular French television program 30 millions d'amis ("30 Million Friends"), a weekly children's show about pet care, made its debut on the TF1 Télévision française network. The show would run for 40 years before ending in 2016.
- In the U.S. state of Hawaii, a group of indigenous Hawaiian Islanders carried out "Operation Protect Kahoʻolawe ʻOhana" in order to stage a mock invasion to reclaim Kahoolawe, the smallest of the eight main islands that make up the state, and to retake it from the exclusive use of the United States Navy. After setting out from the island of Maui, a group of nine people, later called "The Kaho'olawe Nine", made a successful landing, while a larger group was stopped when their boat was intercepted by a Navy patrol boat. Three other members of PKO died when their boat overturned in severe weather.
- The Soviet satellite Kosmos 725 re-entered the Earth's atmosphere after eight months in orbit.
- Died: Louis F. Edelman, 75, American film and TV producer

== January 7, 1976 (Wednesday) ==
- Investigative reporter Seymour Hersh of The New York Times published a news story that brought down the government of Italy, after confirming through multiple sources that the Central Intelligence Agency (CIA) had made at least six million dollars in payments to individual anti-Communist politicians since December 8, with the approval of U.S. President Ford, in response to the gains of the Italian Communist Party in elections in June 1975. The Italian Socialist Party, whose 61 legislators had joined with 266 of Prime Minister Aldo Moro's Democrazia Cristiana (DC) party for a solid majority in the 630-member Chamber of Deputies, pulled out of the coalition after a 15-minute discussion, ending Italy's 37th government since the end of Fascism in 1943.
- American astronomer Eleanor Helin discovered asteroid 2062 Aten, the first of the "Aten asteroid" group, a type known for having a semimajor axis of less than one astronomical unit, closer to the Sun than the Earth's orbit at apogee.
- Police in France rescued Louis Hazan, the CEO of France's largest recording company, at a house in Tremblay-les-Villages in the département of Eure-et-Loir near Chartres, one week after a gang had kidnapped him during a Board of Directors meeting on December 31. The gang had demanded $3.4 million in ransom and was caught when one of the gang members was arrested and found to have written a telephone number on the cuff of his pants leg. The number itself was traced to the building where Hazan was being held hostage.
- In a confrontation between the naval forces of Iceland and the United Kingdom in the "Third Cod War", over fishing rights in the North Atlantic Ocean, the Icelandic gunboat ICGV Thor collided with the Royal Navy frigate HMS Andromeda (F57), causing damage to both vessels. Andromeda returned to the Royal Navy base in Devonport for repairs.
- Kenneth Moss, a former record company executive, was sentenced to 120 days in the Los Angeles County Jail and four years probation for involuntary manslaughter in the 1974 drug-induced death of Average White Band drummer Robbie McIntosh
- Born: Alfonso Soriano, Dominican Major League Baseball second baseman and 7-time All-Star; in San Pedro de Macorís
- Died: Sebastião Antônio de Oliveira, 60, Brazilian accused serial killer known as "The Monster of Bragança", was found hanged in his jail cell.

== January 8, 1976 (Thursday) ==
- Zhou Enlai (then romanized as "Chou En-lai"), the Premier of the People's Republic of China since its 1949 founding by the Chinese Communist Party, and the second most powerful official after Party Chairman Mao Zedong, died of cancer. The Xinhua News Agency released a statement from the Chinese Communist Party that announced "with extreme grief" that "Comrade Chou En-lai... died of cancer at 9:57 A.M. on January 8, 1976, in Peking at the age of 78," and closed with the eulogy "Eternal glory to Comrade Chou En-lai, great proletarian revolutionary of the Chinese people and outstanding Communist fighter!" The death of Zhou removed the prospect that he would be Mao's successor, and brought Vice-Premier Deng Xiaoping into power as the head of the Chinese government in "the most remarkable political comeback in modern Chinese history." Deng had been purged from the Communist Party in 1966 and disgraced until his rehabilitation in 1973.
- The comic strip Jon, written by 30-year-old cartoonist Jim Davis, made its debut as a local feature in the Pendleton Times, a weekly newspaper in the small town of Pendleton, Indiana, beginning what would become one of the most popular comic strips in the world. Initially, the comic focused on "Jon Arbuckle", a young man who has a pet cat named "Garfield". The strip would be accepted by United Feature Syndicate and, with a change of title and a shift in focus from the cat's owner to cat, debut as Garfield on June 19, 1978.

== January 9, 1976 (Friday) ==
- At least 18 ship construction workers were killed, and 20 seriously injured, in a shipyard in Hamburg, West Germany, when a boiler on the Maersk Line container ship Anders Maersk exploded during a routine engine test.
- The University of the Azores was founded on Portugal's Azores Islands, with campuses on Ponta Delgada, Angra and Horta.
- Baseball's San Francisco Giants were sold to a group headed by Labatt Breweries Ltd. of Canada for $13,250,000 with the expectation that the team would play as the Toronto Giants in the 1976 National League baseball season, pending approval by at least 9 of the other 11 National League teams. The Giants had moved from New York City to San Francisco in 1958. The move was called off after the American League granted an expansion franchise to the Labatt consortium (Metro Baseball Ltd.) in February, with the Toronto Blue Jays beginning play in the 1977 season.
- Mel Blount, Pittsburgh's premier pass interceptor in the Steelers' airtight defense, was named the National Football League's Defensive Player of the Year by the Associated Press. Curley Culp of the Houston Oilers and John Dutton of the Baltimore Colts were tied for second in the voting.
- Died: Sir Stanley Whitehead, 68, Speaker of the New Zealand House of Representatives, died of a heart attack less than a week after receiving his knighthood.

== January 10, 1976 (Saturday) ==
- A powerful explosion and the resulting fire killed 23 people and injured more than 80 at a six-story tall residential hotel in Fremont, Nebraska. The blast at the Pathfinder Hotel, used mostly as apartments for senior citizens, happened at 9:30 in the morning and was traced to a natural gas explosion.
- Soviet Foreign Minister Andrei Gromyko and Japan's Foreign Minister Kiichi Miyazawa met in Tokyo to seek an agreement on a treaty between the two nations, ending the state of war that had been in effect since August 1945. The Soviets rejected Japan's demand for the return of four northern islands—Etorofu, Kanashiri, Shikotan and Hobomai—that had been under Soviet control for more than 30 years, as well as the release of 400 Japanese prisoners still incarcerated in the USSR.
- Born: Eduardo Garza, Mexican voice actor; in Mexico City
- Died: Howlin' Wolf (stage name for Chester Arthur Burnett), 65, African-American Chicago blues singer and harmonica player ranked in Rolling Stone magazine in 2011 among the 100 greatest artists of all time. He died of complications from kidney surgery.

== January 11, 1976 (Sunday) ==
- Ecuador's President, General Guillermo Rodriguez Lara, resigned from office after five days of political violence in the South American nation, and was replaced by a three-man military junta. General Rodriguez, who had seized power in 1972 in a military coup, had been permitted to remain until the wedding of his daughter could take place on January 10, as scheduled, at the Presidential Palace. Hours later, he went on television and read a speech saying that he was stepping down "without there having been the slightest military pressure." The three-man junta was fronted by Ecuadorian Army General Guillermo Duran Arcentales, along with Navy Vice Admiral Alfredo Poveda and Air Force General Luis Leoro. The ouster of Rodriguez came two days after Public Works Minister Raul Puma was arrested and Education Minister Gustavo Vasconez was ordered to retire from the Ecuadorian Army.
- The National Hockey League's Philadelphia Flyers defeated the Soviet Red Army ice hockey team, 4 to 1, for the only loss for HC CSKA Moscow in the Super Series '76 exhibitions. The game was described, jokingly, in the North American press as the "Super Bowl of Hockey" between the NHL defending champion Philadelphia Flyers and the Soviet Red Army team (CSKA Moscow), defending champions of the Soviet Championship League.

== January 12, 1976 (Monday) ==
- The United Nations Security Council voted, 11 to 1, with 3 abstentions, to allow the Palestinian Liberation Organization to participate in its debate on Middle East peace and to be accorded the rights of a member nation for the limited purpose of the debate. The U.S. voted against, but did not veto, the resolution, while its allies in NATO, the UK, France and Italy, abstain.
- Thailand's Prime Minister Kukrit Pramoj and his coalition government resigned, and King Bhumibol Adulayadej called for new parliamentary elections to be held in April.
- British commercial diver John Howell drowned when he became distressed shortly after leaving the diving bell while working from the semi-submersible drill rig Western Pacesetter in the northern North Sea. Howell may have knocked off his supply of breathing gas before leaving the bell.
- Spanish forces withdraw their last contingents from Western Sahara, of the coastal city of Dakhla.

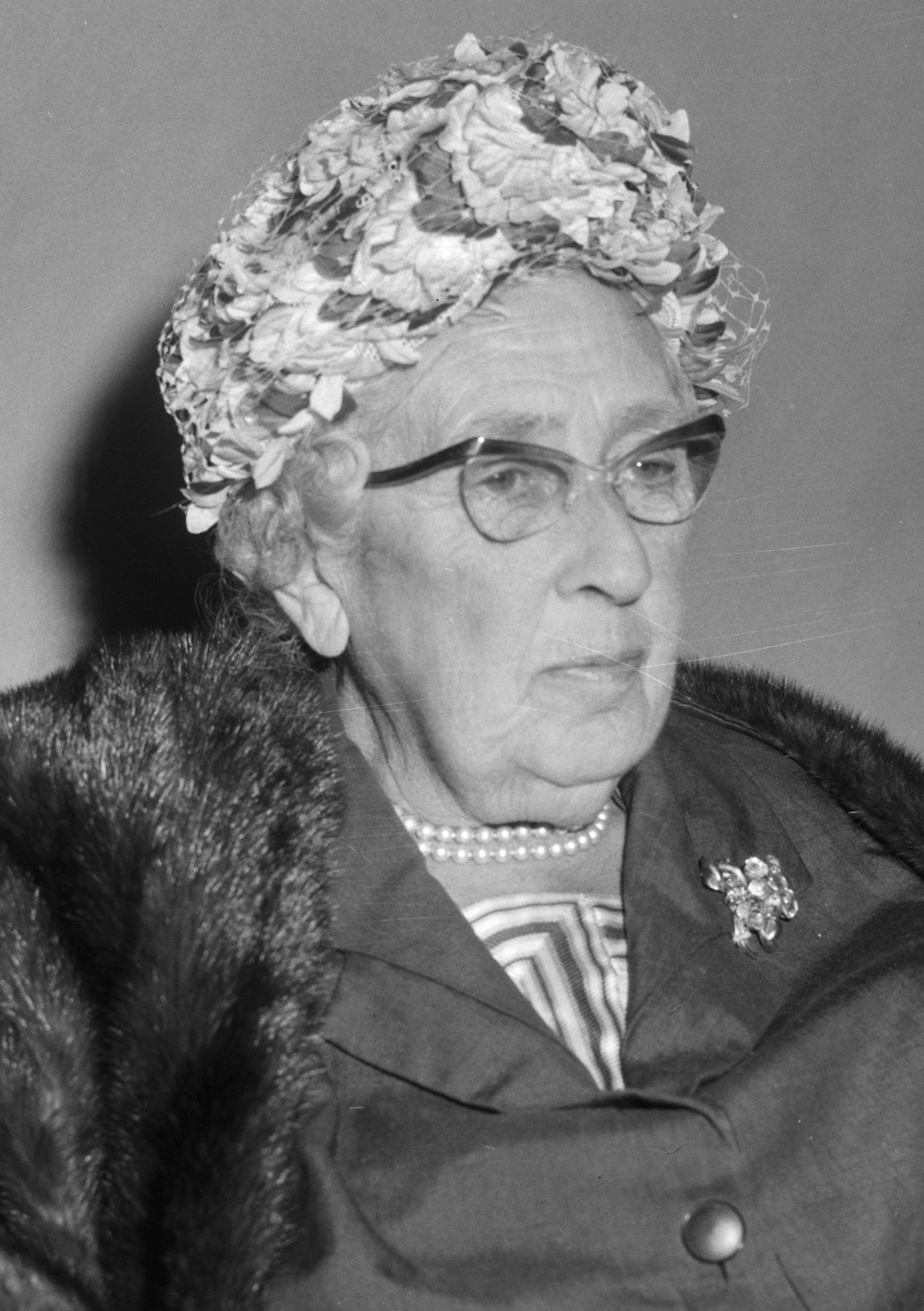
Dame Agatha Christie in 1964

- Died: Dame Agatha Christie, 85, British mystery author. Her writing career had started in 1920 when she published The Mysterious Affair at Styles, the first of 60 novels and numerous short story mysteries.

== January 13, 1976 (Tuesday) ==
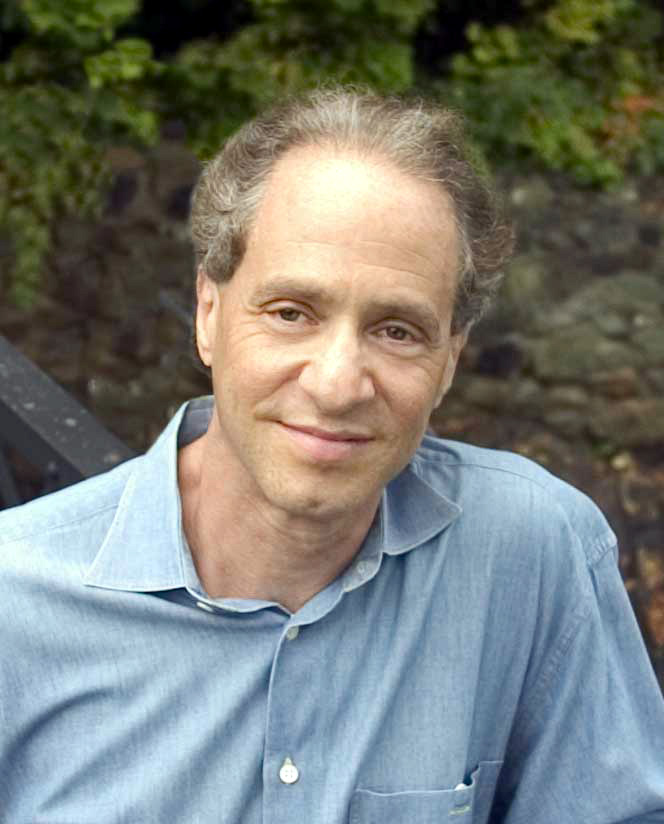
Ray Kurzweil

- The first computer programmed to recognize written text after scanning it with an optical character recognition system, and then to convert it to audio form as spoken words, was demonstrated by its inventor, Ray Kurzweil of Kurzweil Computer Products, at a press event in Cambridge, Massachusetts.
- The World Hockey Association played its All-Star game, departing from its Eastern Division vs. Western Division format for Canadian teams All-Stars against American teams All-Stars, with players representing their clubs regardless of their nationality. The Canada team won, 6 to 1.
- The government of East Germany reversed a decision to prohibit a 6-year-old boy from joining his parents, who had fled to West Berlin in 1975.
- Born:
  - Ross McCall, Scottish actor; in Port Glasgow
  - Michael Peña, American film actor; in Chicago
  - Bic Runga, New Zealand singer-songwriter, in Christchurch
  - Mario Yepes, Colombian soccer football defender known as "Super Mario" in the French league, member of the national team; in Cali
- Died: Margaret Leighton, 53, English stage, film and television actress, died from a cardiac arrest.

== January 14, 1976 (Wednesday) ==
- George and Kathy Lutz fled from their home, at 112 Ocean Avenue in Amityville, New York, after having moved in on December 18, 1975, claiming to have been terrorized by several unexplainable paranormal phenomena at the house. The Lutzes' claims would go on to inspire the story of The Amityville Horror, which would be the basis for several movies and books about the phenomenon.
- The first issue of Italian daily newspaper, la Repubblica, founded by Eugenio Scalfari, went on sale.
- In response to a strike by 4,000 postal workers in Madrid that had stopped delivery of mail since Monday, the government of Spain issued an order drafting all strikers into military service, subject to court martial for failing to report for duty.
- Bob R. Dorsey, the chairman of the Board of the Gulf Oil Corporation was fired, along with two other high executives, after the Board of Directors met to respond to reports that Dorsey and the other two, Vice President for Finance Fred Deering, and Division President William I. Henry, had used the company's money in an attempt to influence political campaigns for candidates who had pledged to support the company.
- Died:
  - Abdul Razak Hussein, 53, Prime Minister of Malaysia since 1970, died from leukemia while in hospital in London to undergo treatment.
  - Muhammad Sakizli, 73, Prime Minister of Libya for two months in 1954, and the last Prime Minister of the Emirate of Cyrenaica, from 1950 until its union with Tripolitania and Fezzan on December 24, 1951, to create the Kingdom of Libya.
  - Mahagama Sekara, 46, Sinhalese poet, teacher, lyricist, playwright, novelist, artist, translator and filmmaker, suffered a fatal cardiac arrest.

== January 15, 1976 (Thursday) ==
- All 13 people aboard a Taxi Aéreo El Venado flight were killed when the C-54A Skymaster airplane crashed into a cloud-covered mountain peak 30 kilometers (19 miles) east of Chipaque in Colombia. The airliner struck the mountain at an altitude of 11,600 feet (3,500 meters) and fell 2,600 feet (790 meters) into a canyon, killing all 13 people on board.
- The government of Spain announced that elections for both houses of the Spanish Parliament, the Cortes Generales, scheduled for March, would be postponed for a year so that a new electoral law could be drawn up setting the requirements for political parties, campaigning and democratic multiparty voting. The March 1976 voting had been scheduled before the death in October of Francisco Franco, who had limited voters to voting yes or no on a set of candidates chosen by Franco's party. The action was described as being made "to avoid the election in March of a new Parliament as unrepresentative as the present one".
- Sara Jane Moore, who had fired a pistol at U.S. President Gerald Ford in San Francisco the previous September 22, was sentenced to life imprisonment by federal judge Samuel Conti, who scolded her for having "no remorse". Judge Conti told her, "What really concerns me most about America was how calloused we have become to crime and violence. If you thought at that moment that you were going to press that trigger and fire that shot you would be subjected to capital punishment, you wouldn't be pulling the trigger." Mrs. Moore, 45 at the time of her appearance, said in a statement that her attempt "accomplished little except to throw away the rest of my life", but added that she was not sorry "because at the time it seemed a correct expression of my anger and, if successful, just might have triggered the kind of chaos that could have started the upheaval of change." Moore would spend 32 years in prison before her release at the age of 77 on December 31, 2007, one year and five days after Gerald Ford's passing away at the age of 93.

== January 16, 1976 (Friday) ==
- The trial of jailed members of the Red Army Faction (including Andreas Baader and Ulrike Meinhof) began in Stuttgart, West Germany. Their lawyers unsuccessfully requested that the terrorists be treated as prisoners of war.

== January 17, 1976 (Saturday) ==
- The Communications Technology Satellite, designated as "Hermes" by Canada's Department of Communications and placed into outer space by the U.S. space agency NASA, was launched from Cape Canaveral in Florida. Described as "a harbinger of 'direct broadcasting' from space to rooftop antennas on earth", the CTS was the most powerful communications satellite up to that time, with a 200 watt transmitter and the first to operate on the super-high frequency (SHF) band. The CTS was sent into its assigned geosynchronous position 22,300 miles (35,900 km) above the Equator on January 29.
- Wales defeated England 21–9 at Twickenham in the 1976 Five Nations Championship. The Welsh team would go on to win the Grand Slam for the seventh time in their history.
- The 18th and final episode of the ABC television variety show Saturday Night Live with Howard Cosell was broadcast, after which Cosell took a hiatus to prepare for the broadcast of the 1976 Winter Olympics and the show was canceled due to low ratings. Having premiered on September 20, 1975, three weeks before the live comedy show NBC's Saturday Night telecast its first episode, the ABC program featured some comedians who would later appear on the NBC program that would be renamed Saturday Night Live, including Bill Murray and Brian Doyle-Murray. Cosell's last guest stars were comedian Billy Crystal and the pop music group Bay City Rollers.
- On NBC's Saturday Night, comedian John Belushi made his second appearance as "the Samurai", after having debuted the character alongside Richard Pryor on December 13 in a sketch called "Samurai Hotel". At the request of host Buck Henry, Belushi's performances would become a recurring feature on the program, and Henry co-stars in the second sketch, "Samurai Delicatessen".
- The Ottawa Civics of the World Hockey Association, who had relocated from Canada in mid-season after starting the 1975–76 season as the Denver Spurs, disbanded after having played seven games (two in Ottawa), and two days after their 5 to 4 loss to the visiting Houston Aeros.
- American commercial diver Clay Don Ellis died, and British diver Derek A. Bannister was left paralyzed from the chest down, after the weight tray was ripped off of their diving bell in the central North Sea, causing it to make an uncontrolled ascent from a depth of 77 metres (253 ft). The accident occurred during a dive from the supply boat Smit Lloyd 112 to repair a leaking connection in an oil pipeline. Both divers suffered lung barotrauma, embolism and pneumothorax.

== January 18, 1976 (Sunday) ==
- The Karantina massacre of as many as 1,500 Lebanese Muslims took place in a Palestinian slum section of east Beirut, when Christian Phalangist militia of the Lebanese Forces, led by Bachir Gemayel, carried out an attack. In retaliation, the Damour massacre of Maronite Christians took place two days later. Gemayel himself would be assassinated on September 14, 1982, shortly after being elected President of Lebanon and before he could take office.
- In Super Bowl X, the Pittsburgh Steelers defeated the Dallas Cowboys, 21 to 17, in Miami. Steelers wide receiver Lynn Swann was named the Super Bowl's Most Valuable Player.
- The halftime show at the Super Bowl, staged by the group Up with People was "200 Years and Just a Baby: A Tribute to America's Bicentennial", with original songs written for the presentation. The performers assembled into a "Liberty Bell" and other formations, shown from cameras aboard the Goodyear Blimp, and closed with the release of hundreds of balloons from the crowd.
- The Scottish Labour Party was formed, by a group breaking away from the UK Labour Party because of dissatisfaction with the then Labour Government's failure to secure a devolved Scottish Assembly, as well as with its social and economic agenda.
- Died:
  - Gertrud Gabl, 27, Austrian Alpine skier, 1969 Alpine skiing women's World Cup champion, was killed in an avalanche while skiing on the northern slope of Mount Gamberg at the ski resort of St. Anton am Arlberg in Austria. Her two companions in the group survived being buried in the snow.
  - Dan Thornton, 64, American cattle rancher and Governor of Colorado from 1951 to 1955, died of a heart attack. The Denver suburb of Thornton, Colorado, had been named in his honor when it was incorporated in 1956.
  - Gurmukh Singh Musafir, 77, Indian short story writer and Chief Minister of the Punjab State in 1966 and 1967

== January 19, 1976 (Monday) ==
- Former Georgia Governor Jimmy Carter won the Iowa Democratic Caucus, the first event for selecting delegates to decide the Democratic nominee for U.S. president. Carter, relatively unknown in the U.S., won twice as many precincts as his closest challenger, U.S. Senator Birch Bayh of Indiana.
- The government of Iceland delivered an ultimatum, threatening to break all diplomatic relations with the United Kingdom if the U.K. did not withdraw all Royal Navy warships from Iceland's "fishing zone" within 200 miles (320 km) of the Icelandic coast. In order to avoid the break, British Prime Minister James Callaghan ordered the vessels to leave.
- The government of Spain, which had conscripted striking postal workers into mandatory military service earlier in the month, issued an order drafting 72,000 striking railway workers into the Spanish armed services, on penalty of a court martial if they refused to work.
- The U.S. Food and Drug Administration announced that it was issuing a ban on "Red Dye Number 2", one of the most common coloring dyes added to foods, drugs and cosmetics to enhance their appearance. FDA Commissioner Alexander M. Schmidt said that the ban was made because of a concern that the dye contains a weak carcinogen, but that the public should not be alarmed about a health hazard.
- The Communist governments of the Democratic Republic of Vietnam (North Vietnam) and of the Republic of Vietnam (South Vietnam) announced that voting would take place on April 25 for a joint national assembly as the first step of the legal unification of Vietnam.
- Born: Fakhar-e-Alam, Pakistani musician who pioneered the fusion of bhangra and rap music; in Islamabad
- Died: Hidetsugu Yagi, 89, Japanese electrical engineer who invented the Yagi–Uda antenna directional television antenna in use since the 1950s for receiving analog VHF and UHF signals before being superseded by cable and satellite transmissions

== January 20, 1976 (Tuesday) ==
- The Damour massacre took place in Lebanon, in an apparent retaliation for the Karantina massacre two days earlier, when Muslim militants with the Lebanese National Movement and the Palestine Liberation Organization attacked the Maronite Christian town of Damour. After the execution of 10 Phalangist Christian militia believed to have participated in the Karantina killings, the attackers killed at least 150 civilians in revenge. Some estimates place the death toll as high as 582.
- The crash of a TAME Ecuador killed 34 of the 48 people on board when the Hawker Siddeley HS 748 crashed into the side of a mountain at an altitude of 10,000 feet (3,048 m). The airplane lost altitude while flying from Loja to Guayaquil. There were eight survivors.
- The bells of Big Ben in London were silenced for the first time in more than 19 years after the chimes ring at 9:00 in the morning, and workmen began the process of maintenance and repairs. The stoppage, which lasted for 51 hours, was required because of painting in the room where the striking mechanisms and the weights for the clock swing out to ring the bells inside the clock tower. Otherwise, an engineer noted, "You would have to dodge them every 15 minutes to paint the walls." The chimes would ring once more at noon on Thursday the 22nd. During the silencing of Big Ben, the large hands on all four faces of the clock would continue to operate.
- U.S. Representative James F. Hastings, a Republican Congressman for New York since 1969, resigned to accept a private job as a lobbyist for Associated Industries. At the time, he was under investigation for corruption, and would be convicted of mail fraud at the end of the year and spend 14 months in prison.
- Born: Anastasia Volochkova, Russian prima ballerina; in Leningrad (now Saint Petersburg), Russian SFSR, Soviet Union
- Died: Lloyd W. Nordstrom, 65, executive of the Nordstrom chain of department stores and majority owner of the new Seattle Seahawks NFL franchise, eight months before the team played its first game in the National Football League. Nordstrom was playing tennis while on vacation in the Mexican resort of Cancun, and suffered a fatal heart attack.

== January 21, 1976 (Wednesday) ==
- The first commercial flights of the Concorde supersonic airliner took place, as two of the jets— a British Airways flight from London's Heathrow Airport and an Air France flight from Paris's Orly Airport— departed simultaneously at 11:40 in the morning. With 98 passengers (only 27 of them paying customers), and Norman Todd as the pilot, British Airways Flight 300 landed at Bahrain after a trip of 4 hours and 10 minutes. The price of a round trip (return fare) ticket was £676.20 (US$1,366 at the time, equivalent to $7,754 or £6,250 in 2025). The French Concorde, with 100 passengers (90 of whom bought tickets) landed in Senegal at Dakar for refueling before flying on to Brazil and landing in Rio de Janeiro.
- The crash in China of a CAAC airliner killed all 45 people aboard. The Antonov An-24 was on its approach to Changsha Huanghua International Airport in Changsha in the Hunan province after having departed from Canton. The accident was reported and the Foreign Ministry of Denmark was alerted.
- By a vote of only 120 for and 181 against, the British House of Commons rejected a bill, sponsored by Labour MP Dennis Canavan, that would have banned corporal punishment in schools.
- Major Otelo Saraiva de Carvalho, Portugal's former military security minister as director of COPCON, was arrested in Lisbon on charges of conspiracy to overthrow the government with an attempted leftist military coup. Carvalho was released on March 4 after posting a bond.
- The southern African nation of Angola formally established the People's Air Force of Angola.
- Born: Emma Bunton, English singer and actress known as "Baby Spice" for the Spice Girls; in Finchley, London

== January 22, 1976 (Thursday) ==
- President Suleiman Franjieh of Lebanon announced that a political and military agreement had been reached between warring Muslim and Christian communities for a ceasefire in the Lebanese Civil War that had started in April. The ceasefire, brokered by the government of Syria, went into effect at 8:00 in the evening, enforced by troops from the armies of Syria and Lebanon, and Palestinian militias, all acting under the authority of the Higher Military Committee.
- Died:
  - Hermann Jónasson, 79, Prime Minister of Iceland 1934 to 1942 and 1956 to 1958
  - Gujarmal Modi, 73, Indian industrialist and philanthropist

== January 23, 1976 (Friday) ==
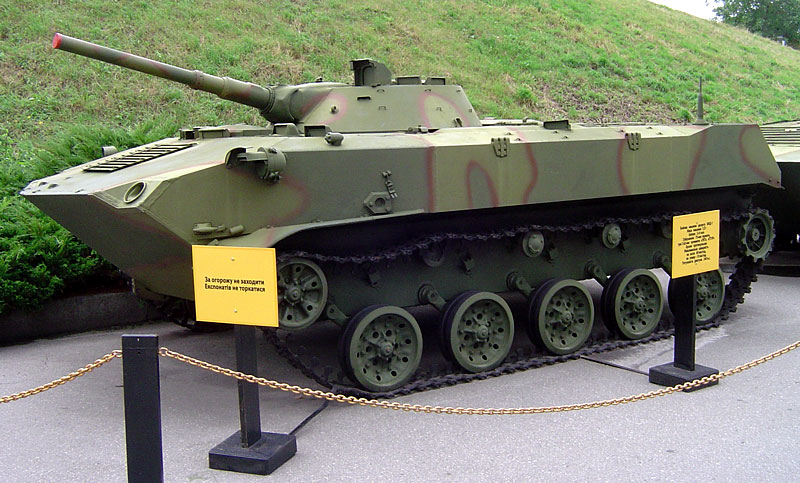
The first triphibious tank, the BMD-1

- The first manned test of a tank designed to be parachuted to the ground, the BMD-1, was carried out by Soviet Army Lieutenant Colonel Leonid Ivanovich Shcherbakov and Major Aleksandr Margelov, who remain inside the armored vehicle as it was dropped from an airplane and guided to the ground with a system of jets and parachutes to slow to a safe descent, and then driven successfully by Shcherbakov and Margelov. The tank name was an abbreviation for Boyevaya Mashina Desanta (Combat Machine, Airborne).
- A federal appeals court dismissed the indictment against Dr. Jeffrey R. MacDonald, a former U.S. Army captain, for charges of three counts of the February 17, 1970 murder of his wife and two daughters, after finding that Dr. MacDonald had been denied the right to a speedy trial guaranteed in the Sixth Amendment to the U.S. Constitution. Although it appeared at first that Dr. MacDonald would no longer be tried, the U.S. Supreme Court would unanimously reverse the decision of the 4th Circuit Court of Appeals on May 1, 1978, and MacDonald would be convicted on August 29, 1979, on three counts of murder.
- Born:
  - Anne Margrethe Hausken, Norwegian orienteering champion; in Karmøy Municipality
  - Angelica Lee (stage name for Li Xinije), Malaysian-born Taiwan film actress; in Alor Setar, Kedah State

Robeson

- Died: Paul Robeson, 77, African American athlete, singer, actor and civil rights activist blacklisted during the McCarthy era for being a Communist sympathizer

== January 24, 1976 (Saturday) ==
- At the 33rd Golden Globe Awards ceremony, One Flew Over the Cuckoo's Nest won all four major awards (Best Actor, Best Actress, Best Director and Best Film).
- The United States and Spain signed a five-year "Treaty of Friendship and Cooperation" in Madrid, with U.S. Secretary of State Henry Kissinger traveling to the Spanish Ministry of Foreign Affairs in Madrid, where he and Spain's Foreign Minister José María de Areilza agreed upon the first defense pact between the two nations.
- Kettering Town FC became the first British football club to play with a sponsor's name printed on the front of player jerseys, after signing a deal with Kettering Tyres.
- Died:
  - Emil Bodnăraș, 72, Vice President of the State Council of Romania since 1967 and Vice Premier since 1955
  - Pinhas Lavon, 71, Israeli politician, member of the Knesset

== January 25, 1976 (Sunday) ==
- An attempt by Italy's Premier Aldo Moro to form a new coalition government, after the Italian Socialist Party had withdrawn its support of Moro's Christian Democrats (DC), collapsed when Moro was unable to supplement DC's 266 legislators with enough from the Social Democrats and the Italian Republicans for the 316 majority.
- The 1976 Brazilian Grand Prix took place in São Paulo, and was won by Niki Lauda.
- A new railway station opens in Brighton, Adelaide, Australia, coinciding with the extension of the line to Christie Downs.
- Died:
  - Inez Brown Burns, 87, American activist and business leader who operated, from 1927 to 1946, an extensive set of hygienic (but illegal) abortion clinics before being convicted of illegal abortions and for tax evasion.
  - Lieutenant Colonel Mehdi Guliyev, 52, Soviet Azerbaijani military officer and World War II hero who received the title of Hero of the Soviet Union and later directed the Azerbaijani SSR branch of the Internal Troops (MVD).
  - Ralph Townsend, 75, American pacifist and war opponent who was arrested for sedition during World War II

== January 26, 1976 (Monday) ==
- For only the 13th time since the founding of the United Nations in 1945, the United States exercised its veto power in the UN Security Council resolution that would have place the UN on record for supporting the creation of an independent Palestinian state.
- Died: João Branco Núncio, 74, Portuguese cavaleiro tauromáquico (bullfighter) for 42 years, was gored by a bull during a bullfight at Golegã

== January 27, 1976 (Tuesday) ==
- The popular American situation comedy Laverne & Shirley premiered on the ABC television network. Though earning mixed reviews from critics the debut episode show was ranked #1 in the Nielsen ratings, only the second time for a TV series premiere, with a 35.1 rating and 49% of the television audience watching Starring Penny Marshall and Cindy Williams as the title characters, the show, a spin-off of Happy Days, would be the highest-rated show by its third season, and continue for eight seasons.
- The first "Slam Dunk Contest" in basketball was held, as a halftime promotion during the 1976 ABA All-Star Game between the host Denver Nuggets and the All-Stars from the other five teams of the financially-ailing American Basketball Association. Julius Erving, then of the New York Nets, was judged the winner of the contest, which included four other competitors. In 1984, the National Basketball Association revived the event, which became a regular feature of the NBA All-Star Game weekend.
- The First Battle of Amgala broke out around the oasis of Amgala, Western Sahara, as units of the Algerian Army were attacked by units from the Royal Moroccan Armed Forces. After 36 hours, the Algerians withdraw, with over 100 Algerians taken prisoner.
- The U.S. House of Representatives joined the U.S. Senate in approving a ban on U.S. military aid to private paramilitary groups operating in Angola, with a 323 to 99 vote to amend the Arms Export Control Act. The Senate had passed the bill, 54 to 22, on December 19. U.S. President Ford signed the bill into law on February 9.

== January 28, 1976 (Wednesday) ==
- Following the example of other nations, the United States Senate voted, 77 to 19, to create an exclusive fishing zone, off limits to all non-American fishing vessels, extending 200 miles (320 km) off of the shores of the United States, effective July 1, 1977.
- Born:
  - Yasmine Belmadi, French film and TV actor; in Aubervilliers (killed in motorbike accident, 2009)
  - Mark Madsen, U.S. basketball player, in Walnut Creek, California.
- Died: Gabriele Allegra 68, Italian-born friar of the Franciscans and Biblical translator, known for his accuracy in translating of the Holy Bible into the Chinese language in a 23-year long project

== January 29, 1976 (Thursday) ==
- India's Lok Sabha, the lower house of its Parliament, voted to make Government censorship of the nation's newspapers permanent, approving the "Prevention of Publication of Objectionable Matter Ordinance" by a vote of 146 to 27. Despite a boycott of the vote by more than half of its 521 members, with 348 not showing up, the Lok Sabha was ruled by its parliamentarian as having a quorum and the measure was sent to the upper house, the Rajya Sabha.
- The government of the Soviet Union publicly acknowledged, for the first time, the existence of the city of Leninsk in the Kazakh SSR near Tyuratam, the site housing the employees of the Soviet crewed space program. The mention came in a dispatch published in the republic's party newspaper, Kazakhstankaya Pravda, that Leninsk had been connected to the Central Asian power grid. A report noted that "It was not clear whether the mention of Leninsk in a Soviet press article represented a censor's oversight or a decision to make the name public."
- Twelve Irish Republican Army bombs were exploded at various sections in the West End of London.
- Died: Jesse Fuller, 79, American "one-man band" blues musician known for playing several instruments simultaneously.

== January 30, 1976 (Friday) ==
- George Bush, formerly the U.S. Ambassador to the United Nations and later the first American liaison to Communist China, became the new Director of Central Intelligence after being appointed by President Ford to restore the reputation of the Central Intelligence Agency (CIA). On January 27, the U.S. Senate had voted, 64 to 27, to confirm Bush's nomination. Bush would serve until the end of Ford's term, and later take office on January 20, 1989, as the 41st President of the United States.
- In its ruling in Buckley v. Valeo, the United States Supreme Court struck down most limits on political campaign spending as unconstitutional, opening the door for unprecedented amounts of donations to candidates for public office and the massive growth of campaign advertising. Among the results were that candidates for the U.S. Senate and the U.S. House of Representatives could now raise and spend unlimited amounts of funds, after previously having been limited to $70,000 for a primary election race and another $70,000 for the general election; individual donors were no longer limited to $1,000 per candidate; and presidential candidates were no longer limited to ten million dollars spending.
- Live from Lincoln Center was broadcast for the first time, on the American PBS television network
- Born: Andy Milonakis, American actor, comedian, rapper and streamer, in Katonah, New York
- Died: James Edmondson, 65, American comedian known to television audiences as "Professor Backwards", was murdered the day after being kidnapped from his home in College Park, Georgia.

== January 31, 1976 (Saturday) ==
- In a large art theft at an exhibition in France of the works of Pablo Picasso, 118 paintings, drawings and other works by Picasso were stolen from an exhibition at the Palais des Papes in Avignon. The stolen Picasso works remained missing until October 6, when they were discovered in a truck that the thieves parked in front of an art gallery in Marseille, and six people were arrested.
- President's Rule was imposed for the first time in the Indian state of Tamil Nadu under article 356 of the Constitution of India. The move, forced by Prime Minister Indira Gandhi, was viewed by political observers as a means of ousting Tamil Nadu Chief Minister Muthuvel Karunanidhi, one of the most vocal opponents of the Emergency Rule that she had proclaimed on June 26.
- General Jorge Fernández Maldonado was installed as the new Prime Minister of Peru and the South American nation's War Minister, replacing General Óscar Vargas Prieto.
- The Falkland Islands general election, due to be held on this day, was postponed until the end of February.
- The company Polferries was established, as the Polish Baltic Shipping Company.
- The Eagles, the first United States national rugby union team ever, made their international debut, playing against Australia's national team, "the Wallabies" at a stadium in Anaheim, California. Australia won, 24 to 12.
- Died: Ernesto Miranda, 34, American laborer whose conviction for crimes, without being advised of his right to remain silent, was reversed on appeal to the U.S. Supreme Court in Miranda v. Arizona. The necessary advising of a suspect's constitutional right against self-incrimination, including the right to remain silent and to have an attorney present for questioning would become known as the "Miranda warning". Miranda was stabbed to death during a fight in a bar in Phoenix, Arizona. A "Miranda warning" card was found in his pocket.
