= December 1975 =

Month of 1975

<<	December 1975					>>
Su	Mo	Tu	We	Th	Fr	Sa
	1	2	3	4	5	6
7	8	9	10	11	12	13
14	15	16	17	18	19	20
21	22	23	24	25	26	27
28	29	30	31

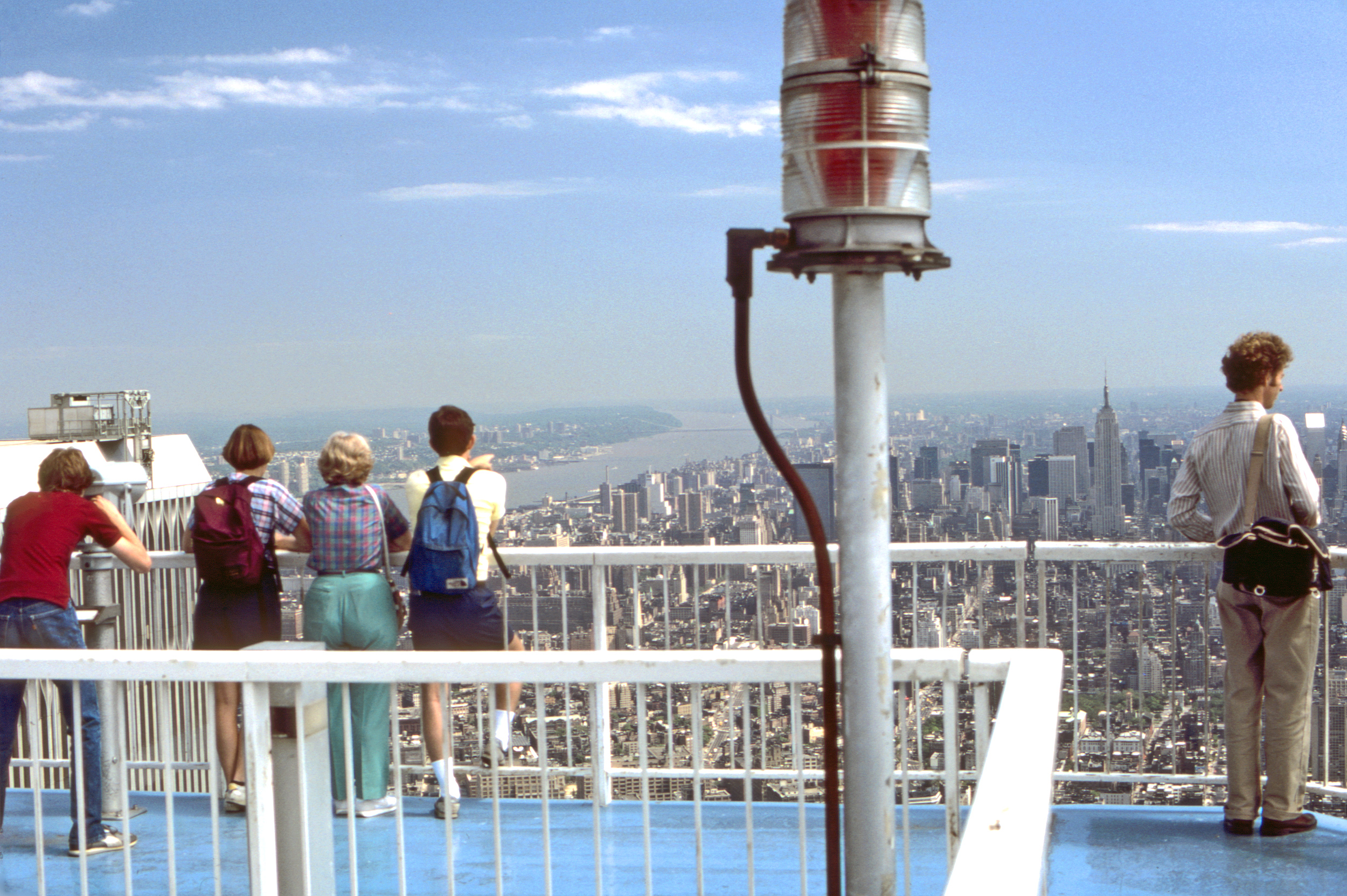
December 14, 1975: World Trade Center observation deck begins operation (pictured in 1984)

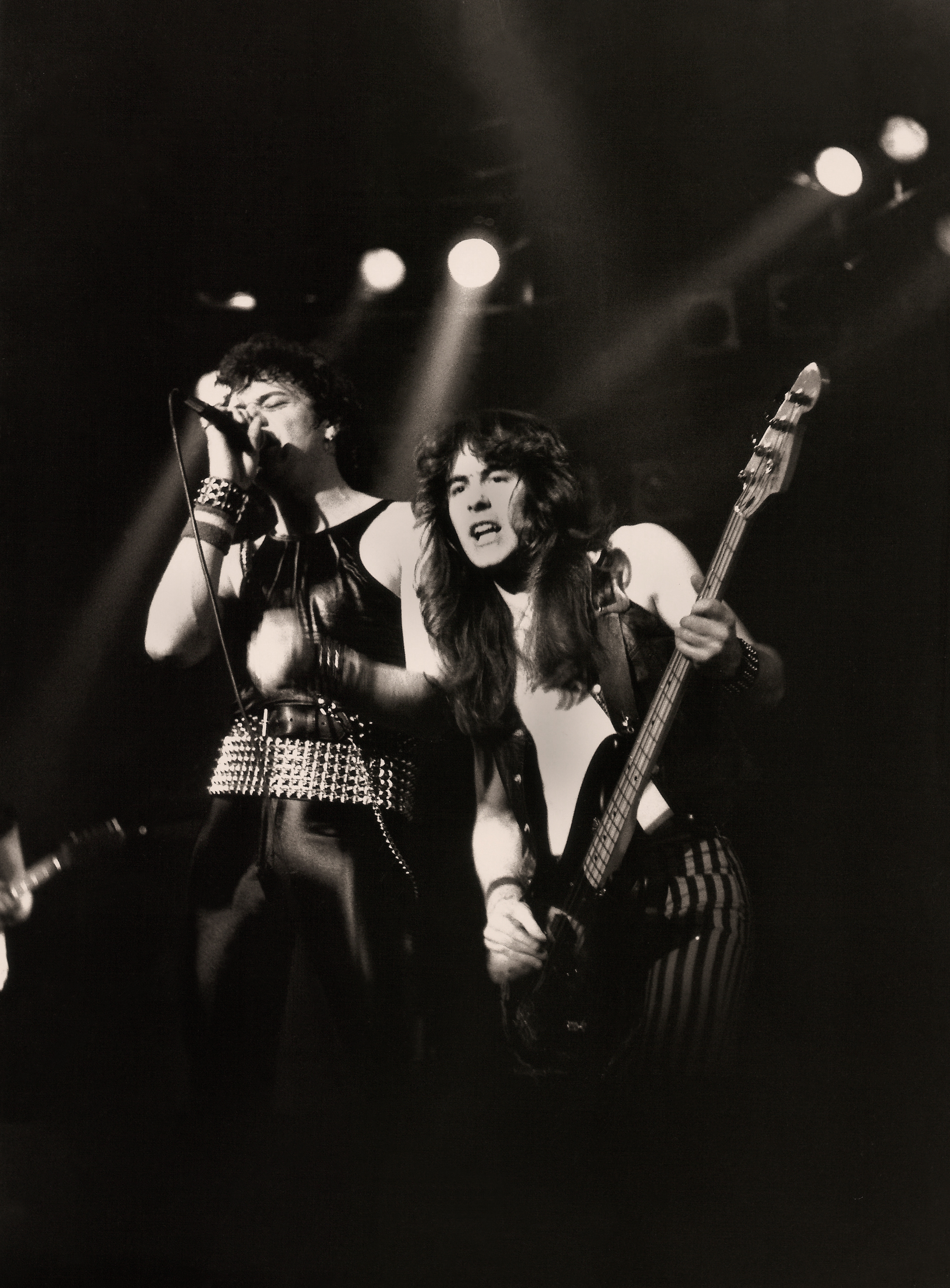
December 25, 1975: Iron Maiden is formed

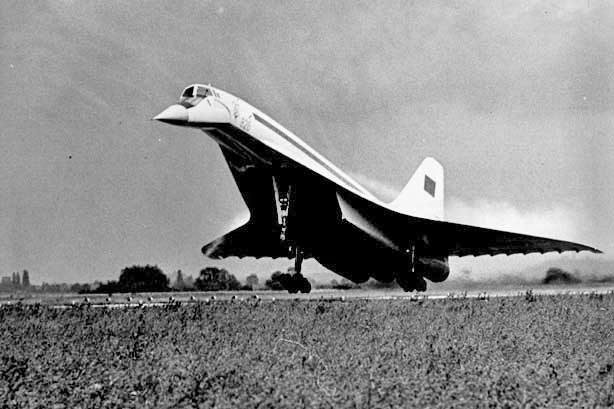
December 26, 1975: Tu-144, "the Soviet Concorde" begins service

The following events occurred in December 1975:

== December 1, 1975 (Monday) ==
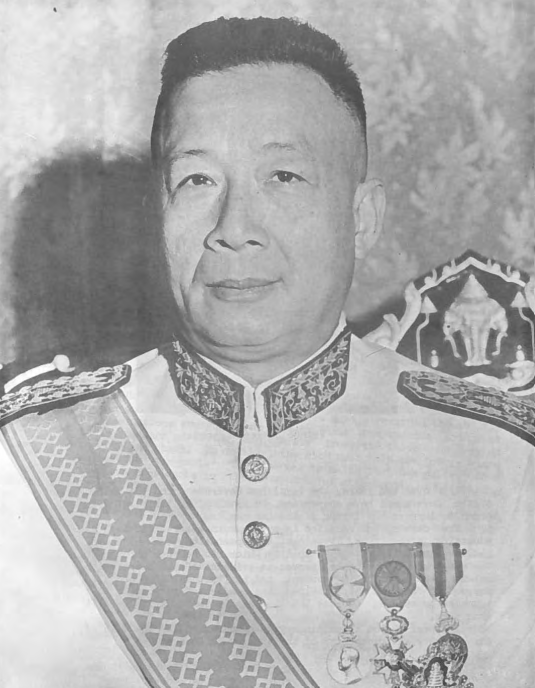
The last King of Laos

- Sisavang Vatthana abdicated his throne as King of Laos. Crown Prince Vong Savang was never crowned, as the monarchy was abolished the next day. Although the Communist government initially designated the former King as "Supreme Adviser to the President", and allowed him draw his monthly salary and to remain in his palace, Sisavang Vatthana would be evicted in April and moved to the former royal residence at Hong Xieng Thong. In March 1977, the former King and Queen, the Crown Prince and Prince Sisavang would all be arrested and deported to a prison camp in Houaphanh Province, and would die three years later.

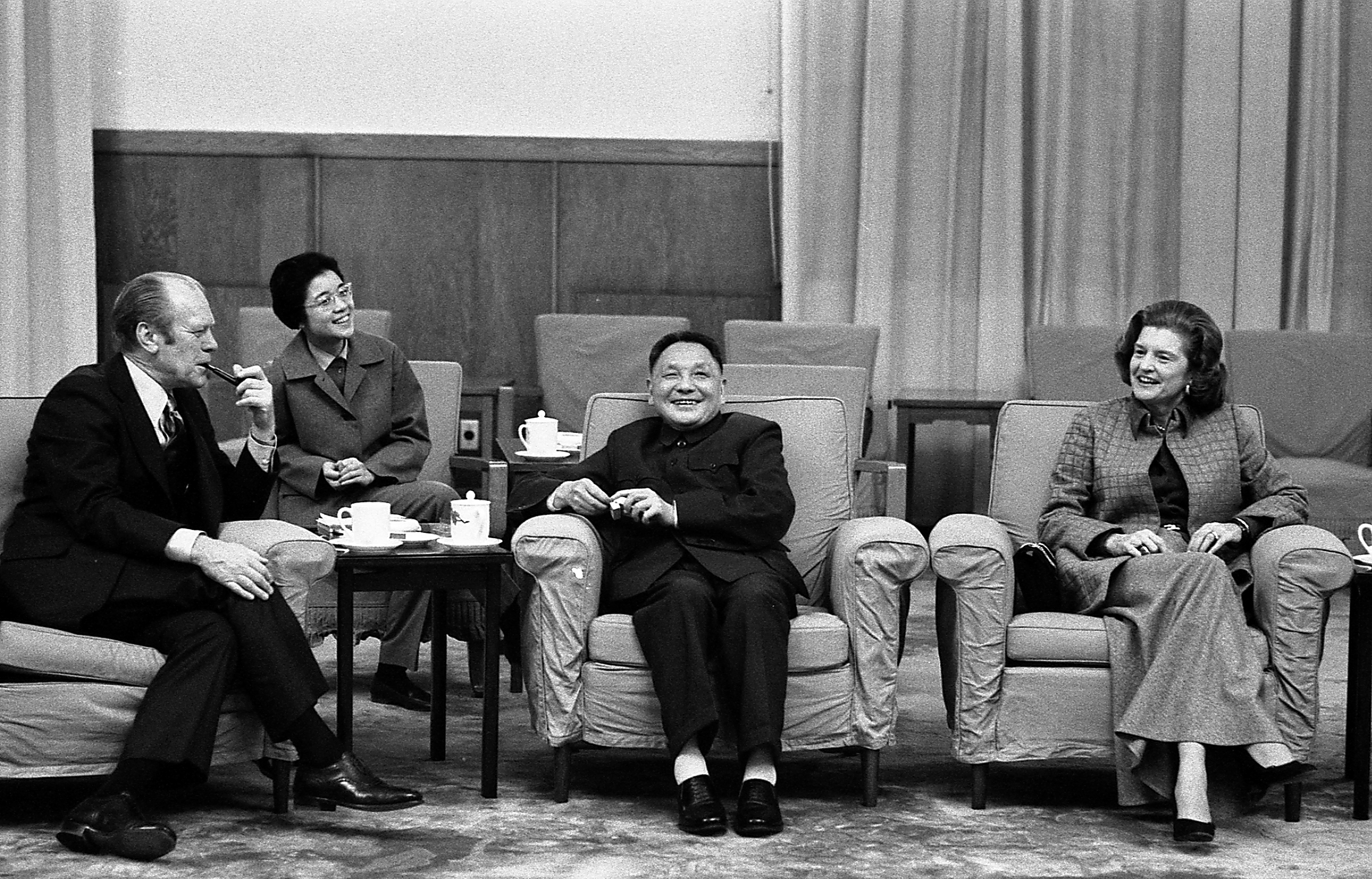
Ford meeting with Deng

- Gerald R. Ford became the second U.S. president to travel to the People's Republic of China, where he met with Vice-Premier Deng Xiaoping.
- Died:
  - Nellie Fox, 47, American baseball player
  - Anna Roosevelt Halsted, 69, American radio personality

== December 2, 1975 (Tuesday) ==
- The People's Republic of China became only the third nation to successfully conduct photographic reconnaissance from space, recovering the Fanhui Shi Weixing series spy satellite China 4, which had been launched on November 26 to take photographs.
- The U.S. House of Representatives voted 213–203 to rescue New York City from bankruptcy, narrowly approving a plan for $6.9 billion of short-term loans over a three-year period. Three days later, the U.S. Senate approved the measure 57–30.
- Laos came under full communist control, when Vientiane fell to the Pathet Lao leader, Prince Souphanouvong, as the first President of the People's Democratic Republic of Laos.
- Seven terrorists from a group seeking independence for the South Moluccan Islands from Indonesia, seized control of a passenger train at Beilen in the Netherlands, killing an engineer and a civilian, and holding 50 other people hostage. The action came as a Dutch court was preparing to render a verdict on 17 other terrorists on trial for plotting to kidnap Queen Juliana. The hijackers would release their remaining 23 hostages on December 14 and surrender to police, after being visited by Johannes Manusama, the unofficial leader of Holland's South Moluccan community.

== December 3, 1975 (Wednesday) ==
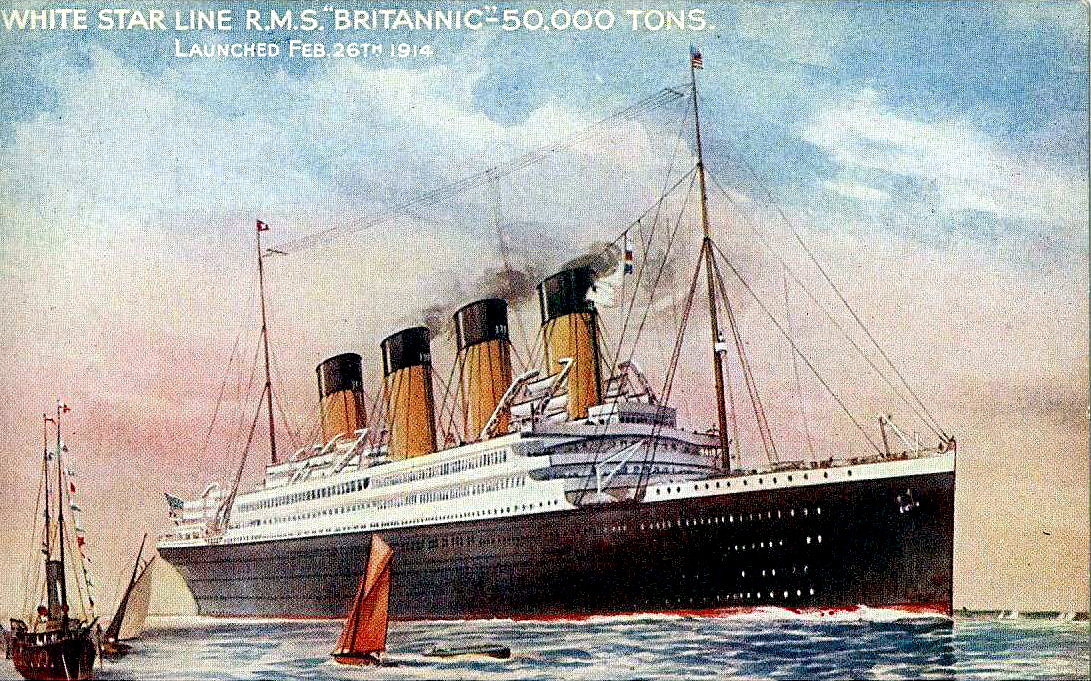
HMS Britannic

- The wreck of the British hospital ship HMHS Britannic was found by Jacques Cousteau, 59 years after it was sunk off of the coast of Greece by a German submarine on November 21, 1916. She had been the sister ship to the Titanic, then refitted to be a hospital, and the largest ship lost in World War One, when 30 people on board were killed and 1,036 were rescued.
- Gunmen seized control of the Credit Lyonnaise Bank in Paris and, the next day, received a $2.2 million ransom and a getaway car. As they drove away with their two hostages, they ran into heavy traffic and crashed into a taxi. The hostages were rescued, and the robbers quickly captured.

== December 4, 1975 (Thursday) ==
- Six South Moluccan terrorists seized the Indonesian consulate in Amsterdam, taking 37 hostages, including 17 children. The gunmen would release their remaining 25 hostages on December 19 after Dutch authorities assured that they would discuss their grievances.
- Died: Hannah Arendt, 69, German political theorist, while entertaining guests at her New York City apartment.

== December 5, 1975 (Friday) ==
- The British policy of "preventive detention" without trial was ended. Beginning on August 9, 1971, any person in Northern Ireland who was suspected of terrorism could be arrested and kept in prison indefinitely. During the more than four years of detention, 1,874 of the 1,981 detainees were Roman Catholic, and only 107 were Protestant.

== December 6, 1975 (Saturday) ==
- Before ending a state visit to Jakarta, U.S. President Gerald R. Ford and U.S. Secretary of State Henry Kissinger assured Indonesia's President Suharto that the United States would not interfere with his plans to invade East Timor, although both would later express surprise at the invasion and deny that Suharto had raised the subject at all. A State Department telegram, declassified 26 years later, would show that Suharto told the two that "We want your understanding if we deem it necessary to take rapid or drastic action" in East Timor, and that Ford responded "We will understand, and will not press you on the issue", and Kissinger added, "If you have made plans, we will do our best to keep everyone quiet until the President returns home."
- On "Black Saturday" during the Lebanese Civil War, the murder of four Lebanese Christians provoked the massacre of 200 Lebanese Muslims by Phalangist gunmen.
- Born: Mia Love, American political commentator and politician who served in the United States House of Representatives from 2015 to 2019 in Utah, the first and to date only black woman elected to congress as a Republican.

== December 7, 1975 (Sunday) ==
- Nine days after East Timor was declared independent of Portugal, Indonesian ships brought in an invasion force for a forcible annexation of the territory. The invasion had been delayed by the visit of U.S. President Ford to Indonesia, and took place hours after Ford departed from Jakarta. At 5:00 am local time, "Operasi Seroja" began. Indonesian planes flew over the Timorese capital at Dili and began dropping paratroopers, with 10,000 Indonesian troops arriving as conquerors. Those Timorese residents who didn't flee to nearby Remexio were soon the victims of "savage and indiscriminate murder, rape, torture and pillage" with hundreds killed in the first day of the attack. At the same time, Indonesian warships shelled the city and while airplanes bombed the interior, according to Martinho da Costa Lopes, the Roman Catholic bishop in Dili.
- Died:
  - Thornton Wilder, 78, American novelist (The Bridge of San Luis Rey) and playwright (Our Town)
  - John S. Knight III, 30, American newspaper publishing heir and an editor of the Philadelphia Daily News, was stabbed to death by three burglars in a home invasion. One of the suspects murdered his accomplice the next day, and would receive two life sentences after being convicted of both crimes, while the third suspect would plead guilty to aiding the murder, and would receive a life sentence.

== December 8, 1975 (Monday) ==
- In the Lebanese Civil War, rival Christian and Muslim militias seized control of luxury hotels and other skyscrapers in Beirut, using the resorts as high ground for cannons, rockets and sniper fire. The Christian Phalangists captured the recently opened Holiday Inn and the Muslims took the 40-story Mour tower. The lower-priced Hotel Urabi was burned down, killing 37 of its guests. Within a week, a truce ended the "battle of the hotels", leaving the buildings in ruins, 600 people killed and 900 injured and armed groups then moved on to looting stores in the Beirut shopping district.
- The last Portuguese colonial authorities left East Timor, departing from the island of Atauro the day after the invasion by Indonesia.
- Pope Paul VI issued the apostolic exhortation Evangelii nuntiandi ("On Evangelization in the Modern World"), exactly ten years after the December 8, 1965 close of the Second Vatican Council.
- The original store, in The Byte Shop, the first chain of personal computer sellers, was opened by Paul Terrell at 1063 West El Camino Real in Mountain View, California. Terrell made the first deal for the new Apple Computer, ordering fifty of the machines from Steve Jobs for a total of $50,000.
- Born: Kevin Harvick, American NASCAR driver and Daytona 500 winner 2007; in Bakersfield, California
- Died: Roger East, 51, Australian journalist who had gone to East Timor to investigate the disappearance of the "Balibo Five". The last Western journalist remaining when Indonesia invaded, East was captured and then executed by soldiers.

== December 9, 1975 (Tuesday) ==
- The United Nations General Assembly voted to approve the Declaration on the Rights of Disabled Persons and the Declaration on the Protection of All Persons from Being Subjected to Torture and Other Cruel, Inhuman or Degrading Treatment or Punishment.
- Nationally syndicated newspaper columnist and radio commentator Jeffrey St. John said in a debate, on the TV show Good Morning America, that he had confirmed, with "one close, personal friend" of U.S. President Ford, "some very disturbing rumors... that the President has a drinking problem". Deputy White House Press Secretary William Greener responded later in the day that St. John's claims were something that he "would not even dignify with a comment".
- Italian luger Luigi Craffonara, a 20-year-old member of the Polizia di Stato, was fatally injured in a crash while training in Berchtesgaden, Austria, for the 1976 Winter Olympics. He died early the following morning at a hospital in Salzburg.
- Died: William A. Wellman, 79, American film director

== December 10, 1975 (Wednesday) ==
- Weeks after Morocco took the northern half of the Western Sahara and Mauritania occupied the southern half, the Western Saharan independence group, the Polisario guerillas, began their first attack, striking against Mauritanian troops.
- Died: Andrew "Boy" Charlton, 68, Australian Olympic swimmer, 1924 gold medalist

== December 11, 1975 (Thursday) ==
- Dave Kopay, former running back for six different NFL teams, became the first pro football player to admit that he was gay. Kopay called Washington Star reporter Lynn Rosellini the day that her report, "Homosexuals in Sports/Why Gay Athletes Have Everything to Lose", came out in the Tuesday newspaper.
- Died: Lee Wiley, 67, American jazz singer

== December 12, 1975 (Friday) ==
- Satcom-1, only the third domestic communications satellite (after Anik 1 and Westar 1), was placed into orbit by the RCA Corporation. The launch was delayed for nine minutes after helicopter patrols saw that a sailboat had come into the area over which the Delta rocket and its cargo were scheduled to travel, and went up at 8:56 in the evening, five minutes before the 14-minute launch window would have been canceled. The initial price of using one of the 24 transponders— $35,000 per month— inspired the creation of new cable television networks, such as ESPN, and the transformation of local TV stations into nationwide "superstations", including Atlanta's WTGC becoming the Turner Broadcasting System.
- The National Association of Black Journalists (NABJ) was formed by 44 African-American news professionals at a meeting in Washington, D.C.
- Sara Jane Moore pleaded guilty to trying to kill U.S. President Gerald Ford on September 22. She would serve for 32 years in prison and be released on December 31, 2007, after Ford's death in 2006.
- Rob Muldoon was sworn in as the 31st Prime Minister of New Zealand.
- In the first opinion poll taken since former California Governor Ronald Reagan had announced that he would run against President Ford for the Republican Party nomination, Gallup Poll respondents favored Reagan, 40% to 32%. In the survey taken in October, before Reagan's entry into the race, Ford had had a 48% to 25% lead.
- Born: Mayim Bialik, American actress known for Blossom and The Big Bang Theory; in San Diego

== December 13, 1975 (Saturday) ==
- Elections were held in Australia following the "double dissolution" of Parliament (dismissal and calling of new elections for both the House of Representatives and the Senate) by Governor-General John Kerr under Section 57 of the constitution. The Liberal Party of Australia, led by new Prime Minister Malcolm Fraser won 68 seats in the 127 member House, while Gough Whitlam's Australian Labor Party (ALP) dropped from 66 to 36 seats. In the Senate, the ALP and the Liberals each had 27 seats.
- The first post-Franco ministry was formed in Spain, with Prime Minister Carlos Arias Navarro joined by a cabinet that included reform-minded ministers.
- The 1961 Convention on the Reduction of Statelessness took effect, having taken fourteen years to be ratified by at least six nations.
- Born: Tom DeLonge, American musician (blink-182), author, and UFOlogist, in Poway, California
- Died: Mary Locke Petermann, 67, American biochemist who had discovered animal ribosomes.
- Born: Mark Arnold, German insurance fachmann, funhead, and archery athlete, 3D archer, in Lahr im Schwarzwald, Germany

== December 14, 1975 (Sunday) ==
- The observation deck at 2 World Trade Center opened, giving visitors a chance to see New York City from the 111th floor of the nation's tallest building. The tourist attraction would host its last visitors on September 10, 2001, and would be 45 minutes away from its 9:30 am opening when the attack on the Twin Towers began on 9/11.
- Pope Paul VI offered an unprecedented and symbolic reconciliation between his own Roman Catholic Church and the Eastern Orthodox Church, kneeling and then kissing the foot of the Greek Orthodox Metropolitan of Chalcedon, Meiliton Hadjis. At the same time, Patriarch Demetrios I of Constantinople honored a representative of the Vatican in Istanbul. The East–West Schism between the churches in Rome and Byzantium had taken place more than 900 years earlier, in 1054.
- Four people were killed and 80 injured when a storage tank exploded outside the Hooker Chemical Company in Niagara Falls, New York, sending a cloud of chlorine gas across a wide area. All of the dead were company employees; many of the injured were bystanders who had been walking or driving by the factory.
- Died: Arthur Treacher, 81, English character actor famous for portraying the proper English butler. At the time of his death, Treacher was the lender of his name to the Arthur Treacher's Fish & Chips restaurant chain, which had more than 800 franchises at the height of its popularity.

== December 15, 1975 (Monday) ==
- A. Q. Khan, a Pakistani scientist who had been working on uranium enrichment for the FDO (Fysisch Dynamisch Onderzoekslaboratorium or Physical Dynamic Research Laboratory) in the Netherlands, left his job suddenly and returned home. Khan took with him copies of blueprints for centrifuges and company information about suppliers of components, then set about to accelerate the Pakistani nuclear program. Pakistan would successfully detonate its first atomic bomb on May 28, 1998.
- Three days after taking office, New Zealand Prime Minister Robert Muldoon announced the immediate halt of further mandatory contributions from employers and employees into the New Zealand Superannuation Scheme created earlier in the year, and that the money that had been paid into the national pension fund would be refunded in 1976. More than 30 years later, an investment strategist would describe the Muldoon government's action as "our worst economic decision over the past 40 years" that "transformed New Zealand from the potential Switzerland of the Southern Hemisphere into a low-ranking OECD economy".
- The People's Republic of China handed over the remains of two U.S. Navy airmen who had been shot down over Chinese territory in the 1960s. At the border between China and Hong Kong, the American Red Cross received urns containing the ashes of Lt. Comm. James L. Buckley of Sioux City, Iowa, and Parachute Rigger Kenneth W. Hugh of Lancaster, California.

== December 16, 1975 (Tuesday) ==
- Sara Jane Moore, who had fired a bullet at U.S. President Ford on September 22, pleaded guilty to charges of attempted assassination, despite protests from her court-appointed public defender, James Hewitt. She would be sentenced to life in prison, but would be paroled after 32 years, on December 31, 2007, a little more than a year after Gerald Ford's passing at the age of 92.
- The U.S. television sitcom One Day at a Time, developed by Norman Lear and starring Bonnie Franklin, Mackenzie Phillips, Valerie Bertinelli and Pat Harrington Jr., premiered on CBS. One critic commented that "This new sit-com has all the elements that have made Lear's TV comedies so successful— crisp, funny dialogue, brilliant casting, honest situations and mutual misunderstanding," while another opined that the comedy "has a mechanical, assembly-line quality to it, which is very surprising for a Norman Lear production," and added, "Lear has created a rather ordinary series." The series would last for nine seasons and 209 episodes.

== December 17, 1975 (Wednesday) ==
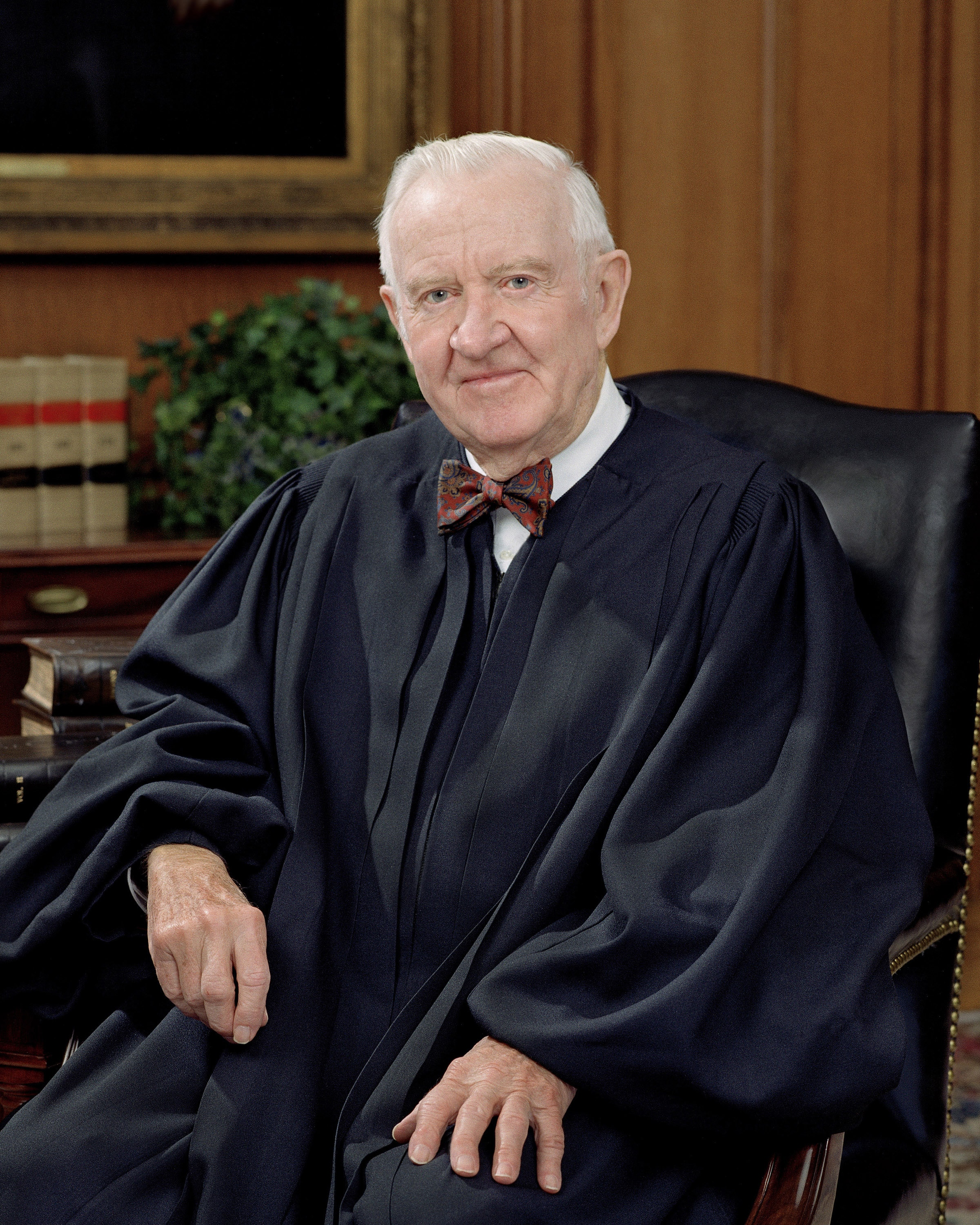
Justice Stevens

- The World Heritage Convention, passed on November 16, 1972 by UNESCO, took effect three months after it was ratified by 20 nations.
- John Paul Stevens was confirmed as a new justice of the United States Supreme Court, in a 98–0 vote by the U.S. Senate, only 16 days after he had been nominated. He would retire on June 29, 2010.
- Lynette "Squeaky" Fromme was sentenced to life in prison for her attempt to assassinate U.S. President Gerald Ford on the September 5, 1975 while he had been in Sacramento, California. Federal prosecutor Dwayne Keyes was struck on the right side of his head by an apple thrown by Fromme, after he told Judge MacBride that her punishment should be “severe” because she had shown herself to be full of “hate and violence.”
- Dissident Soviet poet Natalya Gorbanevskaya was allowed by the government to emigrate. She and her children left on December 21 and moved to Vienna, then to Paris.
- Died:
  - Noble Sissle, 86, American jazz composer best known for "I'm Just Wild About Harry"
  - Hound Dog Taylor (Theodore Roosevelt Taylor), 60, American blues guitarist

== December 18, 1975 (Thursday) ==
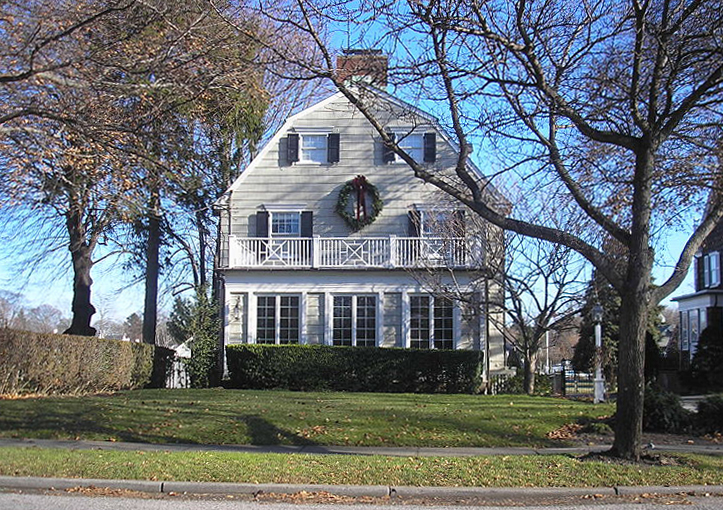
122 Ocean Avenue

- George and Kathleen Lutz moved into a new house at 112 Ocean Avenue in Amityville, New York, along with their three children. Four weeks later, they would flee the house, claiming that it was haunted. They would tell their story to Jay Anson, who wrote it up as the bestselling book The Amityville Horror, which was would later be made into two films.
- The Algerian Government ordered the mass deportation of all 350,000 Moroccans from Algeria.
- Died: Theodosius Dobzhansky, 75, Ukrainian-American biologist and geneticist

== December 19, 1975 (Friday) ==
- American plans for $28,000,000 in military aid, to combat the Marxist government of Angola, were rejected, 54–22, by the U.S. Senate, and 323–99 in the House of Representatives.
- Choi Kyu-hah became the new Prime Minister of South Korea, replacing Kim Jong-pil, who had held the office since 1971.
- At a meeting with Argentine President Isabel Perón at her official residence, the Casa Rosada in Buenos Aires, the commanders of the three branches of Argentina's armed forces told her that if she did not resign, she would be ousted. Lt. General Jorge Videla, commander of the Army of Argentina, made the announcement after the Air Force had mutinied.

== December 20, 1975 (Saturday) ==
- Nicholas Shadrin, formerly Soviet Navy Lt. Commander Nikolai Artamonov, disappeared in Austria after leaving his Vienna hotel to meet with Soviet KGB agents. In 1959, as Artamonov, he had defected to Sweden and then to the United States, where he provided intelligence information to the CIA and been given the new identity of Shadrin, and in 1966, he became a double agent, passing disinformation to the Soviet KGB while spying for the United States. The KGB learned in 1972 about Shadrin's control by the CIA, and set up a plan to kidnap him and take him back to the USSR via Czechoslovakia. Shadrin/Artamanov died from either a heart attack or from an excessive dose of sedatives during the kidnapping.
- Died: William Lundigan, 61, American actor

== December 21, 1975 (Sunday) ==
- The Energy Ministers for eleven of the 13 OPEC nations were taken hostage at the Vienna headquarters of the Organization of Petroleum Exporting Countries. A six-member team of Palestinian commandos, believed to include Carlos (the Jackal), killed three people while fighting their way into the building. The terrorists were provided a jet and free passage from Vienna. After flying to Algiers, the gunmen released the ministers of Ecuador, Gabon, Indonesia, Nigeria and Venezuela, while still keeping those of Algeria, Iran, Iraq, Kuwait, Libya and Saudi Arabia. Representatives from Qatar and the United Arab Emirates had missed the summit. The remaining hostages were freed on December 23, reportedly after the King of Saudi Arabia and the Shah of Iran paid a combined fifty million dollars.
- The Ramsar Convention (Convention on Wetlands of International Importance, especially as Waterfowl Habitat), signed in the Iranian city of Ramsar on February 2, 1971, went into effect.

== December 22, 1975 (Monday) ==
- U.S. President Gerald Ford signed the Energy Policy and Conservation Act into law, authorizing the creation of the Strategic Petroleum Reserve, an emergency stockpile of 714 million barrels (113,500,000 cubic meters) of crude oil to be stored in tanks in underground at four salt domes in the U.S. states of Louisiana and Texas. The bill had passed the House, 300-103 and the Senate, 58-40, for emergency use in the event of a shortage of oil.
- In one of the most eagerly anticipated events of the 1975-76 U.S. television season, Joey Stivic was born on All in the Family, which finished No. 1 in the Nielsen ratings that week with the episode, which attracted 60 percent share of the Monday night viewing audience.
- Born: Marvin Andrews, Trinidadian footballer with 101 caps for the Trinidad and Tobago national team; in San Juan, Trinidad and Tobago

== December 23, 1975 (Tuesday) ==
- The standard "reserve clause" in Major League Baseball contracts was voided in a decision rendered in arbitration proceedings for two players from different teams. Andy Messersmith of the Los Angeles Dodgers and Dave McNally of the Montreal Expos had been prevented from signing with other teams because of the clause that allowed their employers to keep renewing their contracts for one more year. Peter Seitz, who would say later, "I'm not a new Abraham Lincoln freeing the slaves," had been the deciding vote in a 2-1 decision, with union executive director Marvin Miller voting in favor, and the owners' agent, John Gaherin, voting against. Challenges of the ruling would be upheld in court action, and the precedent would allow players in all professional sports to sell their services to the highest bidder after completing their initial contracts.
- A bolt of lightning killed 21 people, who were inside a hut, seeking shelter from a storm in eastern Rhodesia (now Zimbabwe). The incident remains the record for number of people electrocuted by one bolt.
- The U.S. Metric Conversion Act of 1975 was signed into law by President Ford, to guide the gradual replacement of the English system of measurements with the metric system. "To say this legislation is historic is an understatement", Ford told reporters. However, the metric system has never caught on in the United States.
- Richard S. Welch, a 46-year-old attaché at the United States Embassy in Athens, was murdered outside his suburban home in Psychiko after returning with his family from a Christmas party. On November 25, Welch had been identified as an American CIA agent by the English-language daily paper The Athens News. Credit for the killing was taken by the Greek Revolutionary Organization 17 November (Epanastatiki Organosi dekaefta Noemvri).

== December 24, 1975 (Wednesday) ==
- A year after the passage in the United States of the Safe Drinking Water Act, the Environmental Protection Agency (EPA) issued federal regulations setting limits for six synthetic organic chemicals, ten inorganic chemicals, five radionuclides, coliform bacteria, and turbidity. The National Interim Primary Drinking Water Regulations were to take effect on June 24, 1977. The U.S. Public Health Service had first set standards in 1914.
- Born: Maria Zakharova, Russian politician, and controversial Russian Foreign Affairs Ministry spokesperson since 2015; in Moscow, Russian Federation (then Russian SFSR, Soviet Union)
- Died: Bernard Herrmann, 64, American film score composer

== December 25, 1975 (Thursday) ==
- The British band Iron Maiden was formed by bass guitarist Steve Harris in Leyton, East London, who teamed up with vocalist Paul Mario Day, drummer Ron Matthews, and guitarists Terry Rance and Dave Sullivan.
- Born: Marcus Trescothick, English cricketer, in Keynsham

== December 26, 1975 (Friday) ==
- The Soviet Union's supersonic transport jet airplane, the Tupolev Tu-144, began regular service a month before the British and French Concorde began scheduled flights. On the initial flight between Moscow and Alma Ata, the Tu-144 carried no passengers and was used instead to transport freight and mail at Mach 2.35; the Tu-144 would begin flying Aeroflot customers on November 1, 1977, the stop seven months later.
- Born: Marcelo Ríos, Chilean professional tennis player, ranked No. 1 on two occasions in 1998; in Santiago

== December 27, 1975 (Saturday) ==
- A cave-in killed 372 coal miners at the Chasnala Colliery of IISCO, the Indian Iron and Steel Company, in the worst mining disaster in the history of India. After an explosion, millions of gallons of floodwater roared into the coal pits near Dhanbad in the Jharkhand state.
- The "rally towel" made its debut for sports fans, as football's Pittsburgh Steelers distributed 30,000 of the gold and black items, which would later be called the "Terrible Towel", at the team's playoff game against the Baltimore Colts. The Steelers won, 14–0. The towel was the creation of Myron Cope, who announced the team's games on the radio, and the sale of the towels (which inspired similar gimmicks for other sports teams) now goes to charity. Prior to his death in 2008, Cope would comment, "A piece of terrycloth will be the monument to my career."
- Died: Pierre Turquet, 62, English psychiatrist and Olympic fencer, in an auto accident

== December 28, 1975 (Sunday) ==
- Roberto Quieto, the third-in-command for the Argentine Montoneros guerrillas, was captured by soldiers in Martinez during a raid on a warehouse. Within a few weeks, the location of Montoneros bases throughout Argentina was discovered by the Army, apparently because Quieto had betrayed the group while under torture. He was never seen again.
- In the first confrontation between the naval forces of the UK and Iceland in the Third Cod War over fishing rights in the North Atlantic Ocean, the Icelandic Coast Guard vessel ICGV Týr rammed the Royal Navy frigate HMS Andromeda while Andromeda was escorting two British fishing trawlers in what Iceland claimed as its territorial waters. Other authors claim that Andromeda deliberately rammed the Tyr

== December 29, 1975 (Monday) ==
- Eleven travelers were killed and 74 others injured by a terrorist bomb placed in a luggage locker at New York's LaGuardia Airport. The time bomb had been placed inside the coin-operated locker inside the baggage claims section used by both TWA and Delta, and at 6:33 pm, the explosive, equivalent to 25 sticks of dynamite, detonated. Nobody claimed responsibility for the attack and the crime remains unsolved.
- The Norwegian oil supertanker MV Berge Istra, carrying iron ore and a crew of 32, vanished in the Pacific Ocean while sailing from Brazil to Japan with a cargo of iron ore. Although a search for traces of the ship found nothing, two members of the crew had survived and would be found, drifting on a raft, on January 18, after the search had been called off.
- A commission, chaired by Belgium's Prime Minister Leo Tindemans, and requested by the Common Market nations, outlined proposals for creating what would become the European Community. A commentator would write later, "Widely dismissed at the time as timid, the report was in fact a shrewd assessment of the limits to integration in Western Europe and an intelligent guide to the direction that further measures of integration would have to take."

== December 30, 1975 (Tuesday) ==
- After the French pornographic film Emmanuelle became the most popular film in the nation, and the hardcore Jean-François Davy film Exhibition became a hit, France passed a law increasing the taxes on the production and showing of porn films. The peak of French X-rated films would be in 1978, when 167 were released to theaters. By 1987, the production had shifted to home video.
- Born: Tiger Woods, professional golfer, PGA Player of the Year 1997, 1999–2003, 2005–07, 2009, winner of 14 major championships; as Eldrick Tont Woods in Cypress, California

== December 31, 1975 (Wednesday) ==
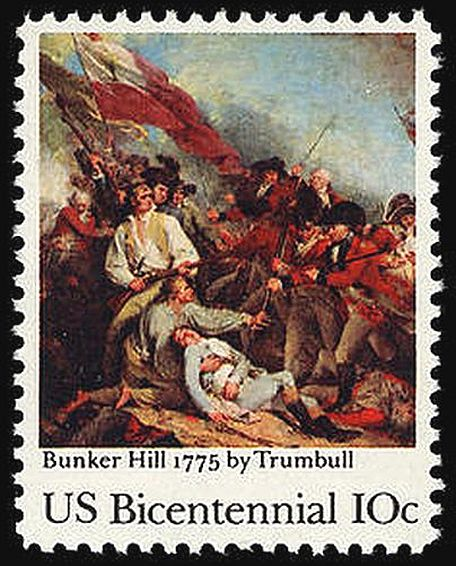
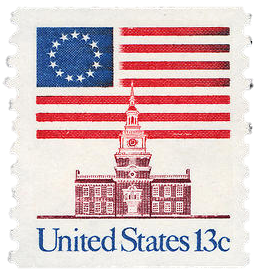
30% increase in price
- The Parliament of France voted to approve independence for three of the four islands of its colony of the Comoros. Grand-Comore (now Ngazidja), Anjouan (Nzwani) and Moheli (Mwali), which had proclaimed a nation in July without French interference, were recognized as an independent nation, but the Parliament set a referendum for the island of Mayotte, which had elected to remain part of France.
- The U.S. Postal Service increased the price of a postage stamp by 30 percent, from 10 cents to 13 cents.
- The NHL's Montreal Canadiens hosted the defending Soviet ice hockey champion, HC CSKA Moscow, and played to a 3–3 tie.
