= Second Battle of Amgala =

1976 Western Sahara War battle

- Part of the Western Sahara War
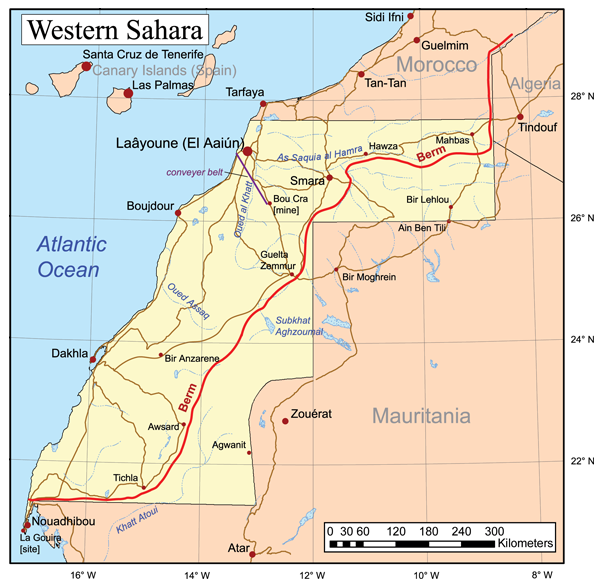
Date	14–15 February 1976
Location	Amgala, Western Sahara 26°26′48″N 11°30′53″W
Result	Algerian-Polisario Front victory

Belligerents
Algeria (Sahrawi Arab Democratic Republic) Polisario Front	Morocco

Commanders and leaders
(Algeria) Houari Boumédiène (Sahrawi Arab Democratic Republic) El-Ouali Mustapha Sayed (Sahrawi Arab Democratic Republic) Brahim Ghali	(Morocco) King Hassan II

Casualties and losses
Unknown	Dozens killed
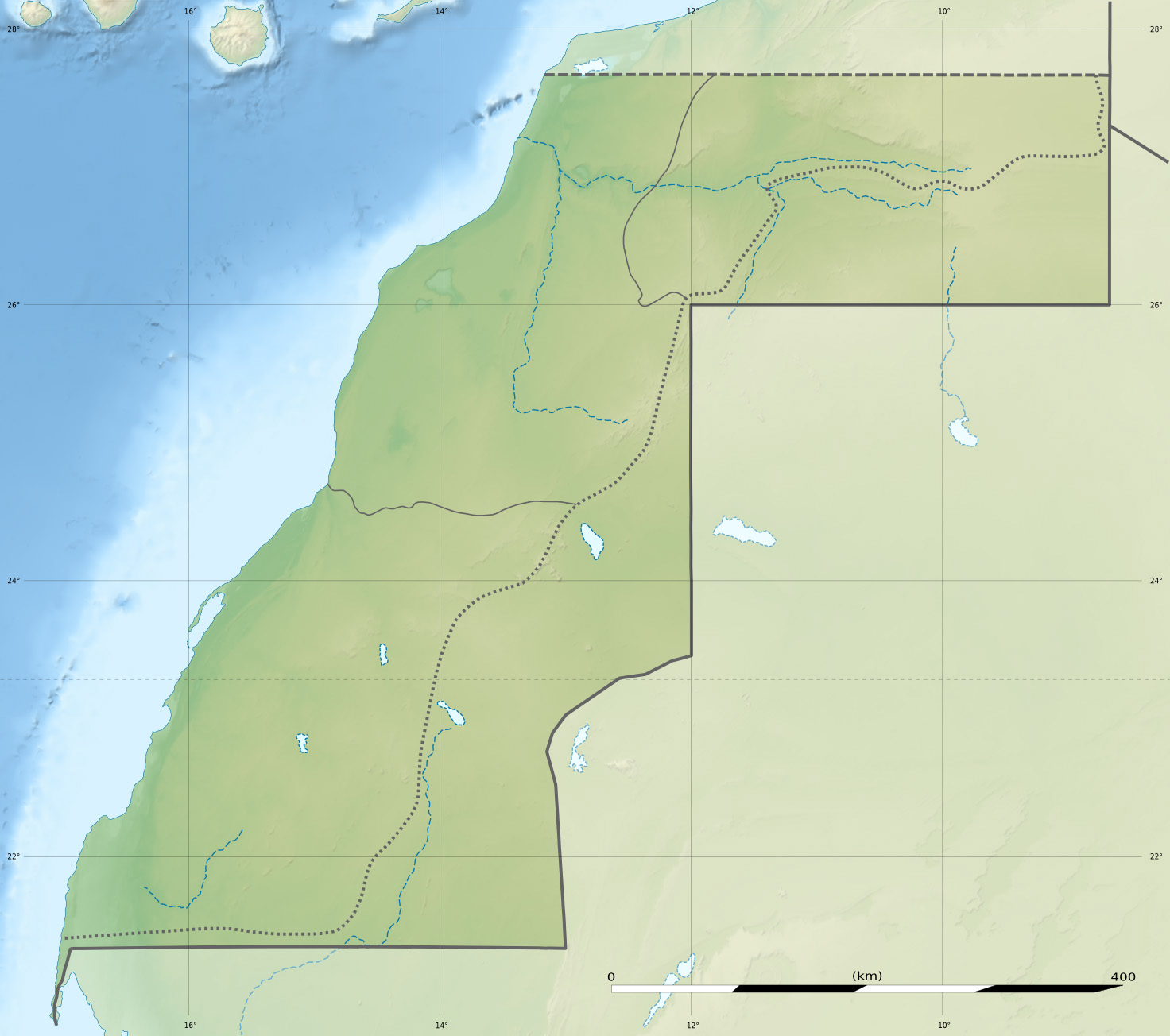
- Location within Western Sahara

The Second Battle of Amgala, also called Amgala II or Amgala 2, took place on 14 February 1976 in the Amgala Oasis in Western Sahara. It pitted the Moroccan troops, who lost Amgala, to the forces of the Sahrawi People's Liberation Army, the armed wing of the Polisario Front, supported by the Algerian army. According to Maurice Barbier, the Moroccan garrison in the city was entirely decimated.

== Background ==
This battle followed the first battle of Amgala, which pitted the Moroccan army against the Algerian army for the first time from 27 to 29 January 1976.

== Battle ==
According to Maurice Barbier and Ahmed Baba Miské, the fighting took place during the night of February 14 to 15, 1976, with strong units attacking the Moroccan troops in the city after its recovery. Shortly after the start of the attack, Moroccan reinforcements left the town of Smara but were unable to counter-attack.

According to the writer Ahmed Baba Miské, the Moroccan garrison was totally destroyed.

== Controversy over the presence of Algerian troops ==
According to the statements of King Hassan II, Algerian troops participated directly in the second battle of Amgala. But at the time, “P.M.D.", a Journalist at Le Monde, and the French political scientist Maurice Barbier considers "plausible" the Algerian version of an attack carried out only by the Polisario without the participation of Algerian soldiers. However, sources within the Algerian army claim that Algerian soldiers donned Polisario military uniforms and captured the town alone.

The two battles of Amgala raised fears of a confrontation between Morocco and Algeria, a prospect that gradually faded in April 1976.
