= 1999 Constitution National Convention =

- 2000 presidential election

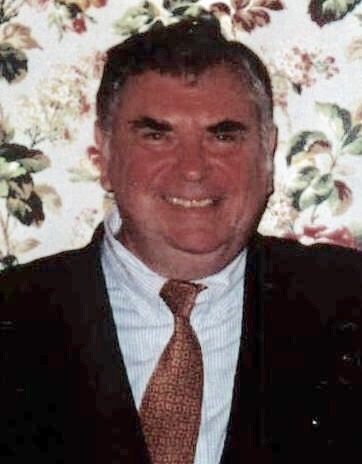
- Presidential nominee (Phillips)

Convention
- Date(s): September 1–6, 1999
- City: St. Louis, Missouri
- Venue: Regal Riverfront Hotel

Candidates
- Presidential nominee: Howard Phillips of Virginia
- Vice-presidential nominee: Joseph Sobran
- Ballots: 1

The 1999 Constitution National Convention was held September 1–6, 1999, at the Regal Riverfront Hotel in St. Louis, Missouri. It saw Howard Phillips nominated by the Constitution Party for president for a third consecutive election.

== Logistics ==
The 1999 convention was held September 1–6, 1999, at the Regal Riverfront Hotel in St. Louis, Missouri. It was here that the party changed its name from the U.S. Taxpayers Party to the Constitution Party.

== Nominations ==
1999 Constitution Party National Convention presidential vote
Candidate	Votes	Percentage
Howard Phillips	500	85.03%
Herbert Titus	88	14.97%
Totals	588	100.00%

Joseph Sobran was nominated unanimously for vice president. Sobran later withdrew in April 2000, citing scheduling conflicts with his journalistic commitments. Curtis Frazier, a surgeon from Missouri, was later selected by the Party Committee to be his replacement on the ticket.
