= First Battle of Amgala =

1976 battle of the Western Sahara War

- Part of the Western Sahara War
Date	27–29 January 1976
Location	Amgala, Western Sahara 26°26′48″N 11°30′53″W
Result	Moroccan victory

Belligerents
Morocco	Algeria (Sahrawi Arab Democratic Republic) Polisario Front (alleged by Morocco)

Commanders and leaders
(Morocco) King Hassan II (Morocco) Mohamed Ben Othman	(Algeria) Pres. Houari Boumediene (Algeria) Lounès Arib

Strength
2 battalions of 600 men	1 battalion of 400 men

Casualties and losses
400 killed (Algerian claim); 2 Killed, 16 wounded (Moroccan claim); 1 Moroccan F-5 aircraft shot down	200 killed 106–118 captured (Moroccan claim)
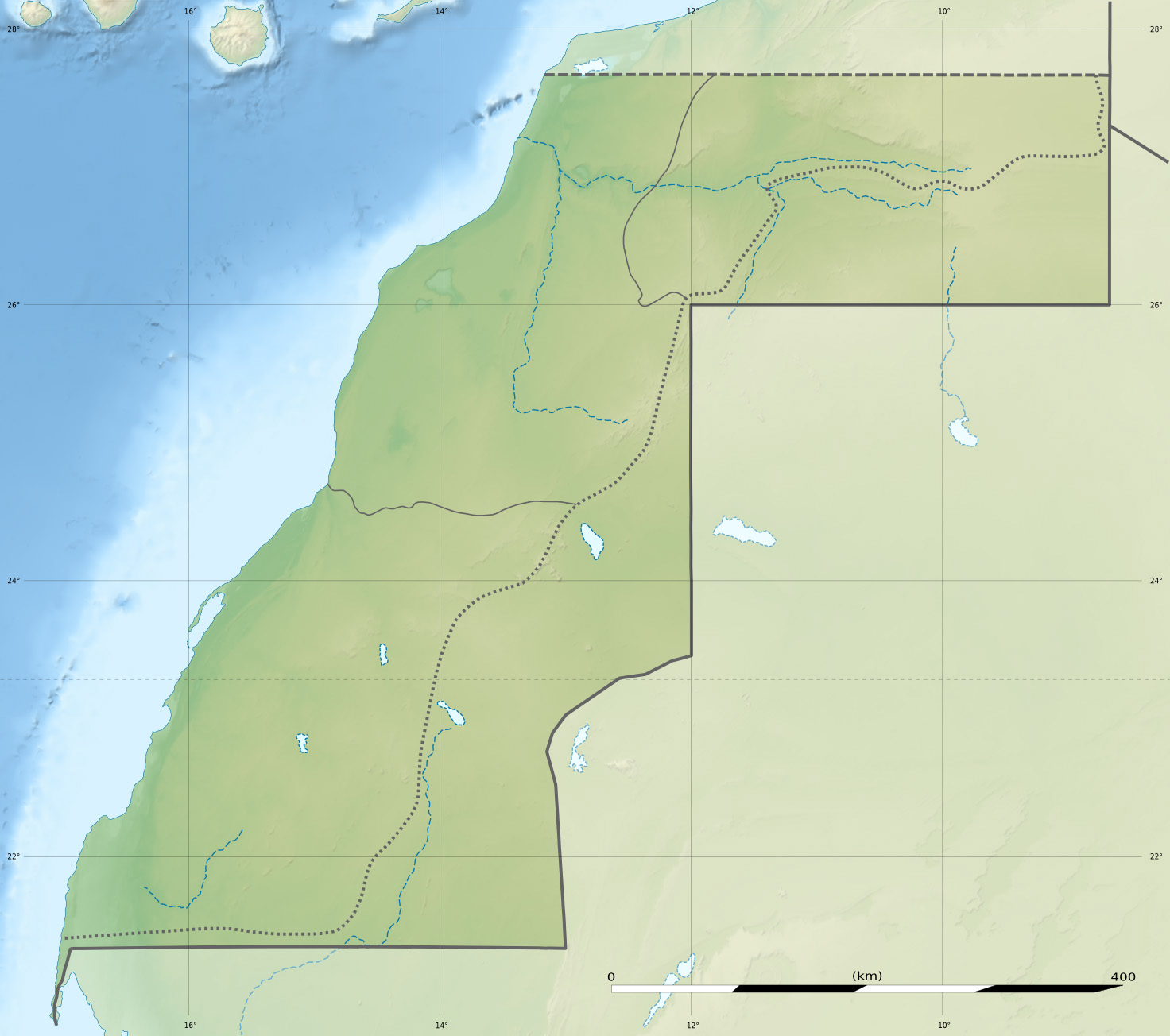
- Location within Western Sahara

The First Battle of Amgala was fought between 27 and 29 January 1976 around the oasis of Amgala, Western Sahara, (Note: The term "Western Sahara" is used here in the geographical sense. In theory, Western Sahara was under Spanish administration until 27 February 1976. Moroccan forces occupied Smara on 27 November 1975, and they and the Mauritanians progressively took over the rest of the Western Saharan settlements in the weeks that followed. The last Spanish troops left from Villa Cisneros on 12 January 1976. After that, control of the region was (and still is) disputed.) about 260 kilometres (160 mi) west of the border with Algeria. Units from the Algerian Army were attacked by units from the Royal Moroccan Armed Forces on the night of 27 January. The Algerians withdrew after fighting for 36 hours. However, the retaliation came fairly soon, between 13 and 15 February 1976 Polisario units defeated Moroccan troops in the second Battle of Amgala.

Spanish Sahara was one of the last colonial possessions in Africa. Morocco had been fighting Spain for the liberation of this territory since 1957 after the Ifni war while Polisario Front, an organization of the local Sahrawi people, had been fighting for independence since its foundation on 1973. The United Nations had long called for a plebiscite on the future status of the colony, but in November 1975 Spain signed an agreement under which it was split between Morocco and Mauritania with no prior referendum. By January 1976 Morocco controlled most towns in their assigned sector. Thousands of Sahrawi nomads were fleeing east to Algeria.

Algeria said their troops were providing food and medical supplies to refugees at Amgala, while Morocco said the Algerian troops were heavily armed and were aiding Polisario. The Moroccan attack went in during the night of 27 January, and on 29 January the Algerians withdrew.The number of deaths on either side is disputed, but over 100 Algerians were taken prisoner. The two countries seemed close to war, but after intense diplomacy there were no further engagements between Algerian and Moroccan troops.

== Background ==
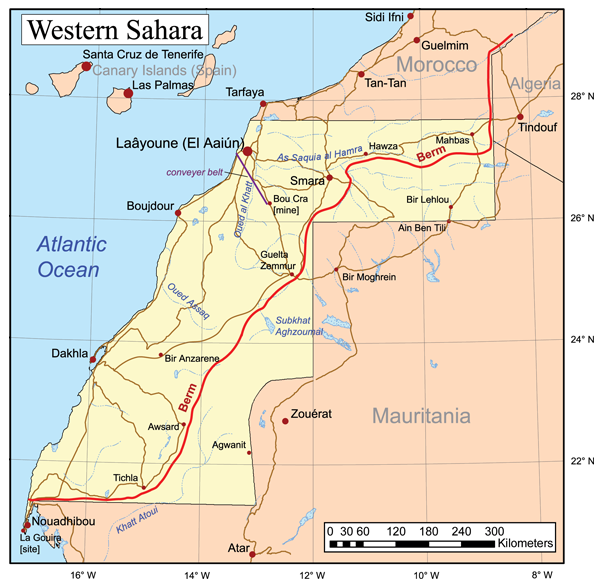
Road map of Western Sahara.

The sparsely populated region of Western Sahara was formerly the Spanish colonial possession of Spanish Sahara. It was mainly inhabited by the Zenaga Berbers and Sahrawi people, a nomadic people of mixed Arab and Berber origin who practice Sunni Islam. In 1966 the United Nations General Assembly called on Spain to hold a plebiscite on self-determination for the territory. The United Nations reaffirmed this demand several times in the following years, the last time on 10 December 1975. In May 1973 the Polisario Front was formed to fight for independence. Algeria provided a haven for Polisario and for Sahrawi refugees in the Tindouf area. Over the following years, Polisario gained control over large parts of the interior. Polisario's numbers were increased by deserters from the Spanish-led Tropas Nómadas and territorial police.

Under the Madrid Accords of 14 November 1975, Spain agreed to divide the region between Morocco and Mauritania without holding a referendum. Details of the agreement were secret, but seem to have included economic concessions to Spain. The Moroccan army entered Dakhla (formerly Villa Cisneros) on 9 January 1976, and on 12 January was joined by Mauritanian troops. On that day the last Spanish Legion troops left the Western Sahara. Algeria, which had not been consulted in the Madrid Accords, had launched a campaign in support of Western Sahara self-determination. In December 1975 large numbers of Moroccans were expelled from Algeria, and Algeria began to infiltrate troops into Western Sahara. By the end of 1975 there were 20,000 Algerian soldiers in the Spanish Sahara or in the neighboring Tindouf zone. According to the Red Cross, about 40,000 refugees were fleeing eastward to escape the advancing Moroccan forces.

== Battle ==
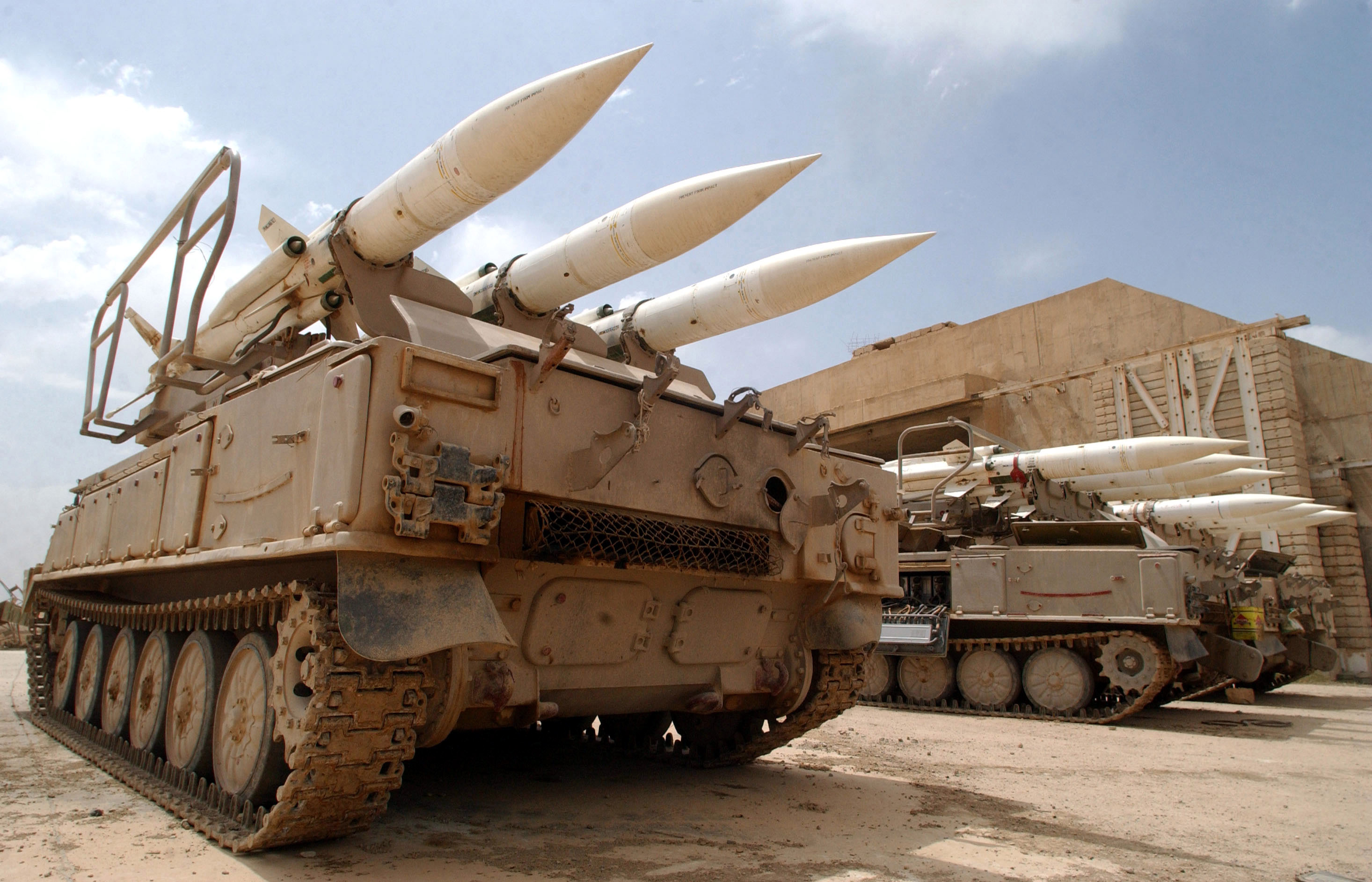
Soviet-manufactured 2K12 Kvadrat (SA-6B Gainful) missile batteries in Baghdad. Reporters were shown missiles with Algerian army markings at Amgala after the battle.

In January 1976, the Amgala waterhole was being used as a staging point for refugees being evacuated to Algeria, assisted by Algerian troops. According to the Algerians, their troops were supplying refugees with food and medical supplies. The Moroccans said that the Algerians were heavily armed with field guns, mortars, anti-aircraft guns and missiles. Some sources say Polisario fighters were present at Amgala, and Algeria had supplied an SA-6 antiaircraft battery with trained Algerian operators so Polisario could fend off Moroccan aircraft that were using napalm bombs. The Moroccans showed reporters Soviet-made missiles with Algerian army markings at the site a few days after the battle.

On the night of 27 January, Moroccan troops surprised the Algerian troops at Amgala. The subsequent engagement lasted for 36 hours. According to Moroccan sources, about 1,200 men were involved in the battle including Algerian soldiers and Sahrawi militia men. The Algerians withdrew on 29 January.

A Polisario spokesman said 440 Moroccans were killed. A Moroccan spokesman said only two of the attackers died and fourteen were wounded, while about 200 Algerians were killed and 109 captured. The Moroccans said they also captured twelve Sahrawis from the Polisario Front. The Algerian newspaper El Moudjahid claimed 400 Moroccan deaths, and went on to say Algeria would have chosen more effective weapons and a more strategic location than the Western Sahara if the intent had been to attack Morocco. International Red Cross officials confirmed the number of Algerian prisoners when they visited them in their place of detention near Rabat.

== Aftermath ==
The day after the attack, on 28 January Algerian President Houari Boumediene sent messages to heads of state around the world. To leaders of the non-aligned countries he said that Algeria was concerned only with the right to self-determination of their brothers and neighbors in Western Sahara, who were facing what amounted to genocide. To the socialists he talked of the Moroccan imperialist strategy in the region. To the western leaders he talked of the right to a free and fair referendum to determine the future of the country. Algeria also presented their position to the United Nations and its Security Council, and held a series of meetings with Arab leaders. Egypt took the most active role in the follow-up diplomacy, calling for an immediate cease-fire and a meeting between the heads of state of Morocco, Algeria and Egypt to resolve the issue, but this was not accepted. Algeria started to provide arms and training to Polisario forces.

On 3 February 1976 Morocco declared that it was willing to submit its dispute with Algeria to arbitration by the Arab League, the Organization of Arab Unity or the United Nations. The U.N. Secretary General appointed Olof Rydbeck, the Swedish ambassador to the U.N. as a mediator. Rydbeck's appointment was welcomed by Algeria, but treated with reserve by Morocco. He visited Western Sahara between 7 and 11 February, visiting El Aaiún, Dakhla and Smara. Although he talked to some local people, he was not able to meet Polisario representatives.

While this diplomacy was continuing, Morocco and Mauritania were completing their occupation of the territory. On 12 February 1976 the Moroccan army occupied Al Mahbes, a community 50 kilometres (31 mi) from the Algerian border that commanded the route to Tindouf. Polisario could not hope to defeat the Moroccan army in open battle, so adopted a guerilla policy of raids and withdrawals to create a zone of insecurity. Renewed fighting flared up at Amgala in February 1976. In an engagement on the night of 14–15 February a force attacked the garrison that Morocco had left at Amgala, causing several dozen deaths (see Second Battle of Amgala). The Moroccan garrison was almost wiped out. Hassan II of Morocco immediately accused Algeria of involvement in the attack, saying the Algerians had used heavy weapons "in numbers conceived for annihilation." Algeria denied that they had participated, and said only Polisario forces had been involved.

These two engagements at Amgala are the only two cases where Algerian and Moroccan troops came into conflict during the Western Sahara War. There were many stories of later Algerian involvement, but there was no proof since no Algerian prisoners were taken after Amgala. In Addis Ababa later that month, Algeria worked for recognition of the Polisario Front by the Organisation of African Unity. Spain officially withdrew from the territory on 27 February 1976, and that day Polisario formally proclaimed the Sahrawi Arab Democratic Republic (SADR). Algeria recognized SADR on 6 March 1976. The next day Morocco broke off diplomatic relations with Algeria. Later in the spring of 1976, Polisario regained Amgala. Morocco took the position once again in May 1977.

Ten years later, with a thawing of relations between Algeria and Morocco, on 25 May 1987 one hundred and fifty Moroccan prisoners of war were exchanged for 102 Algerian soldiers captured during the Battle of Amgala in 1976. Further serious fighting occurred at the oasis in the second Battle of Amgala, when Polisario fighters attacked and temporarily defeated a relatively small number of Moroccan troops before retreating, only to lose the territory to Moroccans again.

== Civilian casualties and military abuses ==
In April 2013, specialists from the University of the Basque Country and the Aranzadi Science Society were contacted by Saharawi families of victims to investigate the discovery of human remains in the Fadret area near Amgala. DNA tests and a forensic investigation are being carried out by this team, which is also investigating the circumstances of their deaths. The team concluded in September 2013 that 8 Sahrawi civilians, including 2 children, had been arrested in February 1976 by a Moroccan military patrol and executed by gunfire, before being buried on the spot.

Dr. Carlos Martin Beristain then concluded: "The fact of finding their remains on the spot is symptomatic of extrajudicial executions".

However, the Equity and Reconciliation Commission (IER), launched by the Moroccan authorities in 2004 to investigate enforced disappearances and other violations, had given no information on the fate of the eight people. The Consultative Council on Human Rights (CCDH), a national body for the protection and promotion of human rights, which had carried out an investigation into four of the eight persons who had been reported missing, had concluded that the four persons had been arrested by Moroccan soldiers near Amgala in February, June and July 1976. The CCDH claims that the four were taken to the military barracks in Smara where they later died.

A former Moroccan soldier, M'barek Daoudi, who served more than 33 years in the Moroccan army and retired in 2008, said in an interview that he witnessed the execution of two Sahrawi women in the Amgala area on 12 February 1976.
