= Joseph Sobran =

American political commentator (1946–2010)

- Born: Michael Joseph Sobran Jr. February 23, 1946; Ypsilanti, Michigan, U.S.
- Died: September 30, 2010 (aged 64); Fairfax, Virginia, U.S.
- Education: Eastern Michigan University (BA, MA)
- Employers: National Review (1972–1993); The Wanderer (1988–2007)
- Political party: Constitution (2000–2010)
- Children: 4

Michael Joseph Sobran Jr. (/ˈsoʊbræn/; February 23, 1946 – September 30, 2010), also known as M. J. Sobran, was an American journalist and syndicated columnist. He wrote for the National Review magazine from 1972 to 1993.

In his columns, Sobran was paleoconservative, opposed to big government, and an isolationist critic of U.S. foreign policy. When he fired Sobran from his longtime job at National Review in 1993, publisher William F. Buckley Jr. termed some of Sobran's writings "contextually anti-semitic". In the early 2000s, Sobran was a speaker for the Holocaust denial group Institute for Historical Review.

== Biography ==
=== Early life ===
Michael Joseph Sobran Jr. was born in Ypsilanti, Michigan, on February 23, 1946, to Doris (née Prevost, 1924–1997), a department store clerk, and Michael Joseph Sobran (1916–1994), an autoworker. His paternal grandparents were from Austria-Hungary, and his mother was of English, French-Canadian and Irish ancestry. Sobran was raised in a Roman Catholic family.

Sobran graduated from Eastern Michigan University in 1969 with a Bachelor of Arts in English. He studied for a Master of English degree with a concentration on Shakespearean studies. In the late 1960s, Sobran lectured on Shakespeare and English on a fellowship with Eastern Michigan.

=== Columnist ===
In 1972, while at Eastern Michigan, Sobran published rebuttals of criticisms from other faculty of an upcoming campus visit by William F. Buckley Jr., publisher of the National Review and a prominent conservative. After reading Sobran's comments, Buckley hired him as a columnist at the National Review. After three years, Buckley promoted Sobran to senior editor. They had a long friendship.

Aside from his work at National Review, Sobran spent 21 years as a commentator on the CBS Radio Spectrum program series. He was a syndicated columnist, first with the Los Angeles Times and later with the Universal Press Syndicate. From 1988 to 2007, he wrote the column "Washington Watch" for the traditionalist lay Catholic weekly The Wanderer. He also wrote a monthly column for the traditionalist Catholic Family News (a publication considered antisemitic by the Southern Poverty Law Center) and the "Bare Bodkin" column for Chronicles magazine. He was a media fellow of the Mises Institute. Asked to summarize his views, Sobran said once, "I won't be satisfied until the Church resumes burning for heresy"—a remark that Buchanan's biographer Timothy Stanley described as "funny, offensive and honest".

=== Firing from National Review ===
In 1993, in a column in The Wanderer, Sobran attacked Buckley for his support of the 1991 Gulf War. Already unhappy with Sobran's columns on Israel and antisemitism, Buckley was reportedly angered that Sobran had used information from their private conversations and decided to fire him as senior editor. Buckley said he considered some of Sobran's columns to be "contextually anti-Semitic. By this I mean that if he had been talking, let us say, about the lobbying interests of the Arabs or of the Chinese, he would not have raised eyebrows as an anti-Arab or an anti-Chinese". In response to his firing, Sobran claimed that Buckley told him to "stop antagonizing the Zionist crowd" and accused him of libel and moral incapacitation. In his own assessment, columnist Norman Podhoretz wrote that Sobran's columns were "anti-Semitic in themselves, and not merely 'contextually'".

In 1994, he founded Sobran's: The Real News of the Month, a newsletter that published until 2007. Sobran was named the Constitution Party's vice presidential nominee in 2000, but withdrew later that year due to scheduling conflicts.

=== Institute for Historical Review ===
In 2001, Pat Buchanan offered Sobran a column in Buchanan's new magazine The American Conservative. (After Sobran's death, Buchanan called him "perhaps the finest columnist of our generation".) However, the magazine's editor, Scott McConnell, withdrew the offer when Sobran refused to cancel his appearance before the Institute for Historical Review, a leading Holocaust-denying group.

In 2001 and 2003, Sobran spoke at conferences organized by David Irving and shared the podium with Paul Fromm, Charles D. Provan, and Mark Weber, director of the Institute for Historical Review. In 2002, he spoke at the Institute for Historical Review's annual conference. Referring to Sobran's appearance at the conferences, historian Deborah Lipstadt wrote: "Mr. Sobran may not have been an unequivocal [Holocaust] denier, but he gave support and comfort to the worst of them". Writing in National Review, Matthew Scully said: "His appearance before that sorry outfit a few years ago [...] remains impossible to explain, at least if you're trying to absolve him".

In the 2008 presidential election, Sobran endorsed Constitution Party candidate Chuck Baldwin.

=== Death and legacy ===
Sobran was twice married and divorced. He had four children. Sobran died in a nursing home in Fairfax, Virginia, on September 30, 2010, of kidney failure due to diabetes.

== Views ==
=== Philosophy ===
Throughout much of his career, Sobran identified as a paleoconservative like his colleagues Samuel T. Francis, Pat Buchanan, and Peter Gemma. He claimed to support a strict interpretation of the United States Constitution. He asserted that the Tenth Amendment meant that almost every federal government act since the Civil War had been illegal. In 2002, Sobran announced his philosophical and political shift to libertarianism (paleolibertarian anarcho-capitalism), citing inspiration by theorists Murray Rothbard and Hans-Hermann Hoppe. He referred to himself as a "theo-anarchist".

Sobran asserted in the neo-Confederate Southern Partisan magazine that Martin Luther King Jr.'s dream had become an "American nightmare" because civil rights had encouraged, in Sobran's words, "black thugs".

=== Jews and Israel ===
Sobran frequently used his columns to criticize Israel, the Holocaust and Zionism. In one column, Sobran wrote that The New York Times "really ought to change its name to Holocaust Update". In a 1992 column, he complained of "a more or less official national obsession with a tiny, faraway socialist ethnocracy", meaning Israel. Sobran argued that the 9/11 attacks were a result of the United States government's policies in the Middle East. He claimed those policies are formed by the Jewish lobby.

In 2002, Sobran wrote, "My chief offense, it appears, has been to insist that the state of Israel has been a costly and treacherous ‘ally’ to the United States. As of last September 11, I should think that is undeniable. But I have yet to receive a single apology for having been correct." Sobran said he lacked the "scholarly competence" to be a Holocaust denier. Regarding his speech at the IHR convention, he wrote, "Even positing that I was speaking to a disreputable audience, I expect to be judged by what I say, not whom I say it to". He said his attitude was not anti-Semitism but "more like counter-Semitism".

== Published works ==
=== Books ===
- Single Issues: Essays on the Crucial Social Questions (1983, Arlington House)
- Pensées: Notes for the reactionary of tomorrow (1985, Arlington House)
- Alias Shakespeare: Solving the Greatest Literary Mystery of All Time (1997, Free Press) Sobran espoused the Oxfordian theory that Edward de Vere, 17th Earl of Oxford, wrote the plays attributed to William Shakespeare .
- Hustler: The Clinton Legacy (2000, Griffin Communications)
- Sobran's: The Real News of the Month (monthly newsletter)
- Joseph Sobran: The National Review Years (selections of his work during his time at National Review, edited by Fran Griffin, 2012, Griffin Communications)

At the time of his death, Sobran was working on two books, one concerning Abraham Lincoln's presidency and the United States Constitution and another about de Vere's poetry.

=== Articles and speeches ===
His essays appeared in The Human Life Review, Celebrate Life! and The Free Market.

- The Church Today: Less Catholic Than the Pope? – National Committee of Catholic Laymen – 1979
- How Tyranny Came to America, Sobran's, n.d.
- Pensees: Notes for the reactionary of tomorrow, National Review, December 31, 1985. (extended essay)
- Power and Betrayal – Griffin Communications – 1998
- Anything Called a Program is Unconstitutional – Griffin Communications – 2001

Party political offices
Preceded by Herb Titus	Constitution nominee for Vice President of the United States; Withdrew; 2000	Succeeded by Curtis Frazier
