= Mark Arnold =

Mark Arnold may refer to:

- Mark Arnold (actor) (born 1957), American actor
- Mark Arnold (volleyball) (born 1964), American volleyball player
- Mark Arnold (musician) (born 1966), American punk rock singer
- Mark Arnold (historian) (born 1966), American writer and commentator

== See also ==
- Mark Arnold-Forster (1920–1981), writer and journalist
- Marc Arnold (born 1970), South African footballer
