= 1976 Taxi Aereo el Venado Douglas DC-4 accident =

1976 Aviation Accident Over Colombia

Taxi Aereo el Venado Douglas DC-4 accident
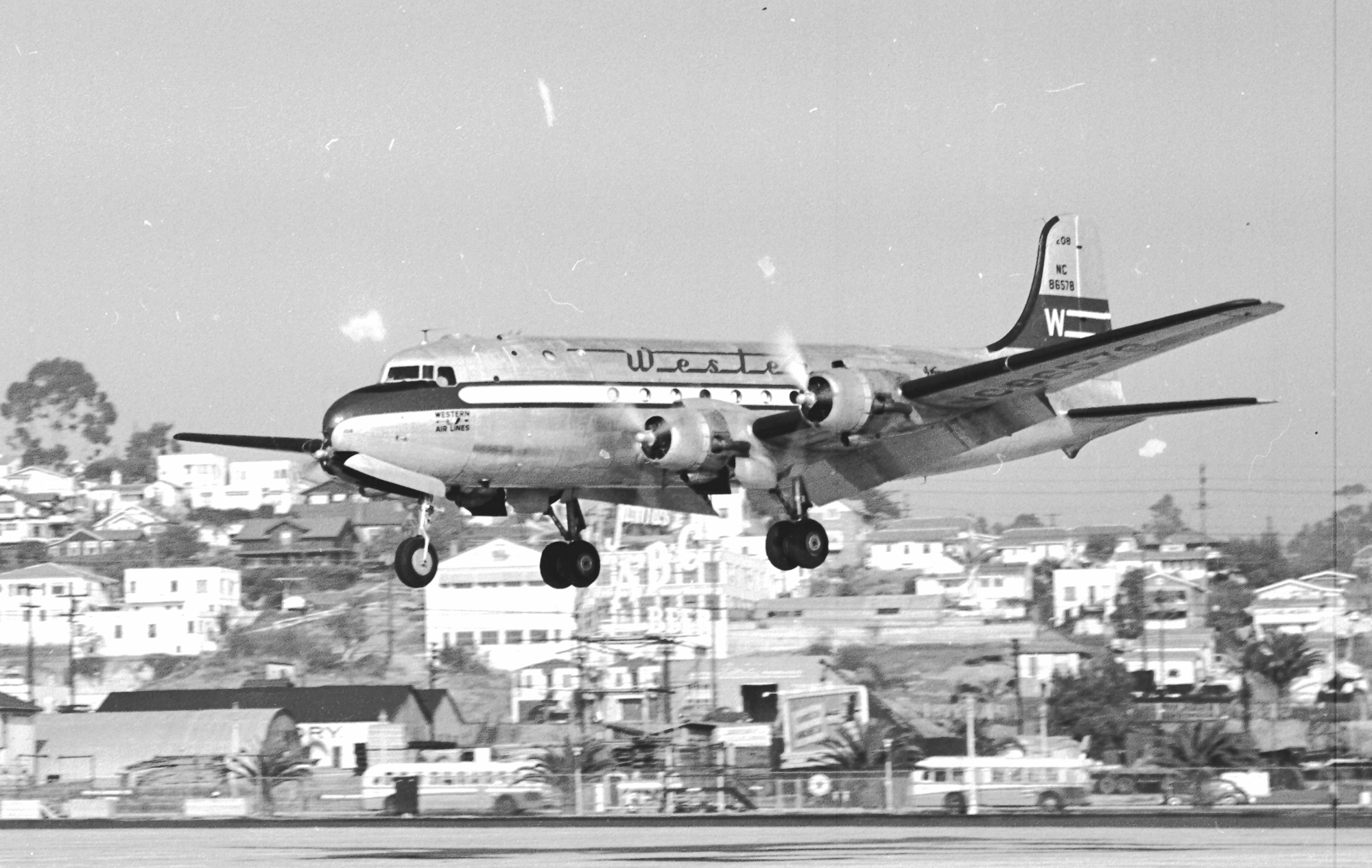
- A DC-4 similar to the accident aircraft

Accident
- Date: 15 January 1976
- Summary: Controlled flight into terrain
- Site: Western Cordilera, near Chipaque, Colombia; 4.4°N 73.8255°W

Aircraft
- Aircraft type: Douglas DC-4
- Operator: Taxi Aereo el Venado
- Registration: HK-127
- Flight origin: Bogotá-El Dorado Airport
- Destination: La Macarena Airport
- Occupants: 13
- Passengers: 10
- Crew: 3
- Fatalities: 13
- Survivors: 0

On 15 January 1976, a Taxi Aereo el Venado DC-4 crashed into a mountain 50 km (31 mi; 27 nmi) from Bogotá killing all the thirteen people on board.

== Accident ==
The aircraft was on a domestic charter flight from Bogotá-El Dorado Airport to La Macarena Airport, with three crew and ten passengers. The aircraft took off at 11:37, and the pilot reported his departure and said he would call at the next reporting point over El Boqueron. Nothing else was heard from the aircraft despite attempts by Air Traffic Control to contact them. Three hours later, the local authorities in Chipaque reported that an aircraft had hit one of the peaks of the Western Cordillera at a height of 3,540 m (11,610 ft). The mountain had been hidden by clouds.

== Aircraft ==
The four-engined Douglas DC-4, former military Douglas C-54E, registered HK-127, was built in the United States by Douglas in Chicago. It was delivered to the United States Army Air Force (USAAF) on 26 January 1944 and was sold after the war to Pan Am, later Avianca, until sold in 1972 to Taxi Aereo el Venado.
