= Spectrum (radio program) =

Radio program from CBS Radio

Spectrum was a daily broadcast series on CBS Radio, c. 1970–1992, featuring a varied range of opinions on political and social issues.

== History ==
At first its five-minute segments ran three times a day, and rotated commentary from six print journalists: M. Stanton Evans, Jeffrey St. John, Stewart Alsop, Jon K. Jessup, Nicholas Von Hoffman and Murray Kempton.

Other personalities were soon added to the lineup, including conservative writer Phyllis Schlafly, newspaper editor James Jackson Kilpatrick, political analyst Nick Thimmesch, lifestyle columnist Ellen Goodman, magazine writer Shana Alexander, National Review editor Joseph Sobran, Wall Street Journal editor Vermont Royster, African-American journalist Ethel L. Payne, and teenage autobiographer Joyce Maynard (age 19 in 1973).

Spectrum was noted for its introductory taglines (e.g., "Nine distinct viewpoints!" or "Ten opposing points of view!") and the querulous, often breathless delivery of some commentators as they squeezed their heated opinions into the short time-slot. CBS News found a television use for this argumentativeness when it adapted the Spectrum format as a two-person segment, in its 60 Minutes news program. Called "Point-Counter-Point," it initially faced off James J. Kilpatrick (one of Spectrum's "conservatives") against Nicholas von Hoffman (perhaps Spectrum's most strident "liberal"). After von Hoffman was fired for an on-air comment, he was replaced by Spectrum newcomer Shana Alexander.
