= Battle of Amgala (1989) =

Military operation in the Western Sahara War

- Part of Western Sahara War
Date	8 November 1989
Location	Amgala, Western Sahara

Belligerents
Morocco	Sahrawi Arab Democratic Republic; Polisario Front

Strength
Unknown	Unknown

Casualties and losses
45 killed (Morocco claim); 250 killed 350 wounded (POLISARIO claim); 28 captured	87 killed (Morocco claim)

The 1989 Battle of Amgala took place on 8 November 1989, when two POLISARIO mechanized columns launched a massive attack against Moroccan troops in the Amgala region, managing to cross the Moroccan Wall and advance 20 kilometres (12 mi) in direction to Smara, to finally retreat before Moroccan retaliation to their positions in the Free Zone (region).

It was the last military operation of the Western Sahara War until Operation Rattle in 1991.

== See also ==
- Sahrawi refugees
