= Amgala =

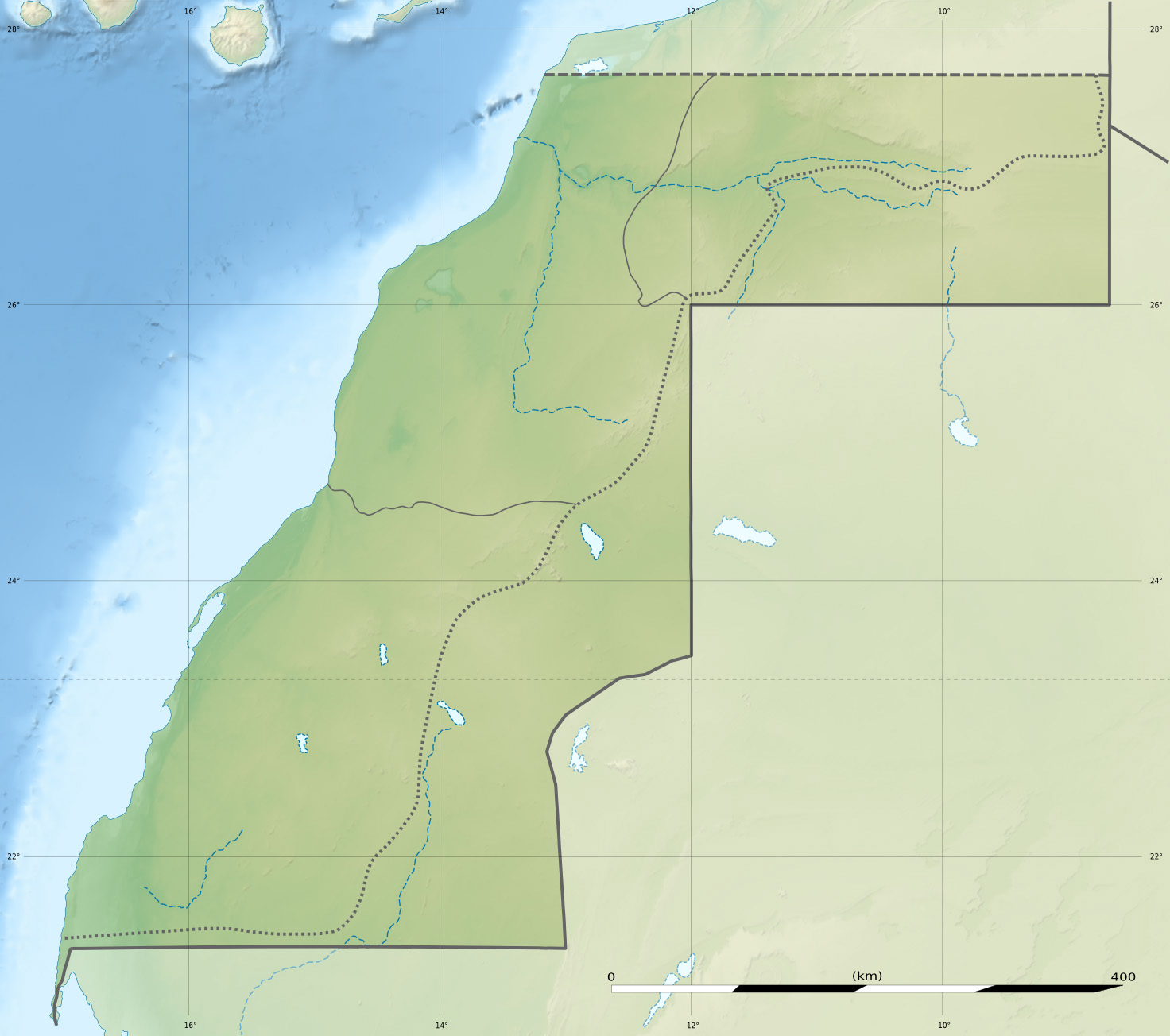
- Location in Western Sahara Amgala (Africa)
- Coordinates: 26°16′45″N 11°7′59″W
- Territory: Western Sahara
- Claimed by: Kingdom of Morocco, Sahrawi Arab Democratic Republic
- Controlled by: Sahrawi Arab Democratic Republic
- Time zone: UTC+0 (GMT)

Amgala (Arabic: أمگالة) is an oasis in Western Sahara. It is located between Tifariti and Smara, outside the Moroccan Wall in the area controlled by the Polisario.

== Western Sahara War ==
Amgala was the scene of several SPLA-RMA battles. In January 1976 and again in February 1976, clashes took place in Amgala between units of the Royal Moroccan Armed Forces (RMA) and Polisario Front forces (SPLA), supported by units of the Algerian Army.

Because of its ample supply of water, Amgala was an important place in the Saguia el-Hamra Valley and Algerian troops set up a Polisario base here where refugees could be given food and medical assistance and transported onward to Algeria. The unexpected attack by the Moroccans caused much anger as well as heavy damage, and ninety-nine Algerian soldiers were captured. An all-out war between the two countries was only avoided because of decisive action by President Houari Boumediene of Algeria. After that, Algeria withdrew its troops from the area but increased its support for the rebels. Algeria said that their forces were only in the area to render humanitarian assistance to Sahrawi refugees fleeing from Moroccan occupation and heading for the Sahrawi refugee camps at Tindouf, in western Algeria. Morocco said the conflict was a direct military intervention by Algeria on the side of Polisario.

A second battle took place at Amgala between the 13 and 15 February 1976. On this occasion, Polisario troops defeated the small Moroccan garrison which suffered heavy casualties and were nearly wiped out. Morocco complained that the Algerians had been involved in this attack, but the latter denied the claim.

Another Battle of Amgala took place on 8 November 1989.
