= March 1976 =

Month of 1976

<<	March 1976					>>
Su	Mo	Tu	We	Th	Fr	Sa
	1	2	3	4	5	6
7	8	9	10	11	12	13
14	15	16	17	18	19	20
21	22	23	24	25	26	27
28	29	30	31

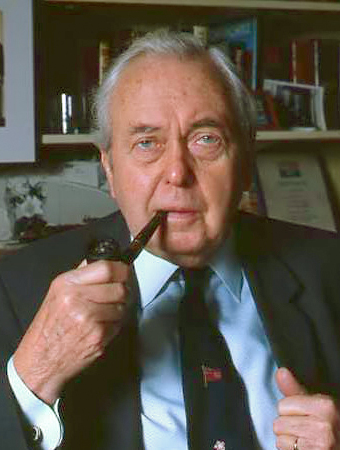
March 16, 1976: British Prime Minister Harold Wilson resigns five days after surviving vote of confidence in Commons

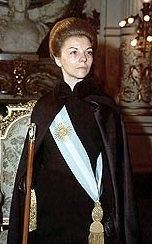
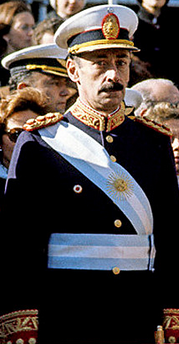
March 24, 1976: Argentina's President Isabel Peron is overthrown in a coup d'etat and replaced by General Jorge Rafael Videla.

March 15, 1976: First "carpool lanes" in the United States are inaugurated

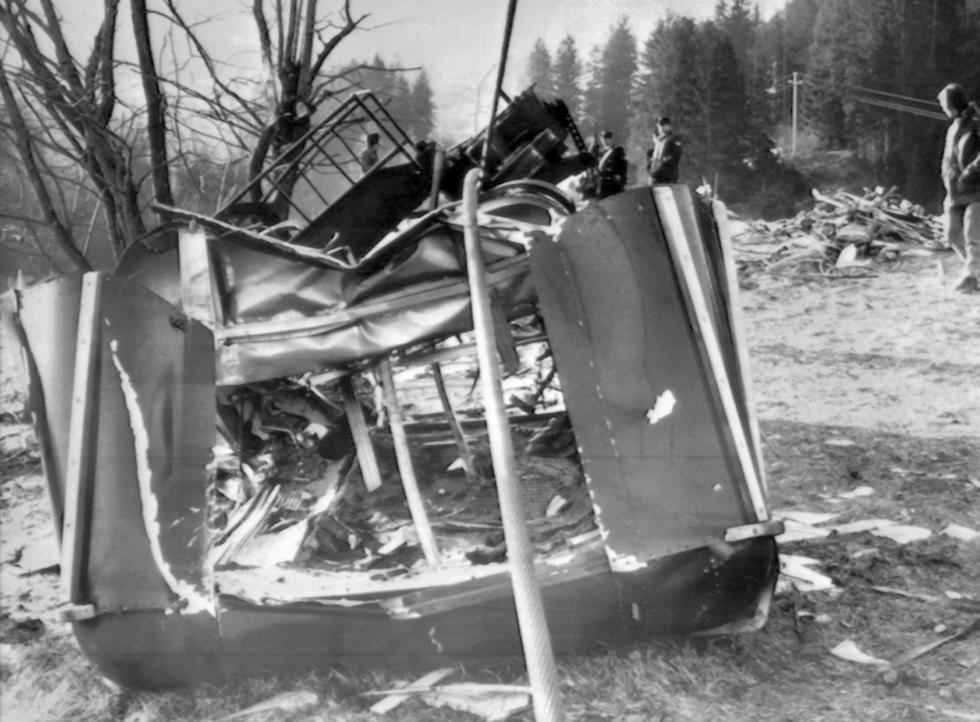
March 9, 1976: Forty-three skiers killed in Italy when aerial cable car falls 200 feet

The following events occurred in March 1976:

== March 1, 1976 (Monday) ==
- The House of Commons of the United Kingdom voted, 249 to 139, to make the wearing of seat belts mandatory in the UK for drivers and passengers in the front seat of a motor vehicle.
- In the United Kingdom, Home Secretary Merlyn Rees announced that Special Category Status for those sentenced for scheduled terrorist crimes relating to the civil violence in Northern Ireland, introduced in 1972, would be phased out, in accordance with the recommendations of the Gardner Committee.
- The Norwegian drilling rig Deep Sea Driller ran aground off Bergen, breaking off a leg and killing six crew members. It would later be repaired and returned to service.
- The Association of Tennis Professionals began issuing its rankings of individual men who were the best in doubles play, after having ranked singles play for men beginning on August 23, 1973. Bob Hewitt of South Africa became the first player named as #1 in doubles. At the time, Jimmy Connors of the U.S. continued to be listed by the ATP as the #1 ranked male player in the world. The Women's Tennis Association, which had Chris Evert ranked as the #1 individual, would not make doubles player rankings until 1984.

== March 2, 1976 (Tuesday) ==
- A TAM – Transporte Aéreo Militar IAI Arava 201 (registration TAM-76) on a military flight crashed in the Bolivian jungle, killing 19 of the 22 people on board. The plane's wreckage was found two days later.
- Steam locomotive train service ended permanently in Japan after more than a century, as the last two steam engines in non-heritage service, Japanese National Railways Class 9600s numbered 39679 and 79602 are retired from switching duties in Hokkaido.
- Former Georgia Governor Jimmy Carter temporarily lost his front-runner status in the race for the 1976 Democratic Party nomination for the U.S. presidential election, as U.S. Senator Henry M. Jackson of Washington won the Massachusetts Primary, finishing ahead of Alabama Governor George C. Wallace of Alabama and Congressman Morris K. Udall of Arizona. Carter finished in fourth place. In the Republican primary, U.S. President Ford won uncontested, although one-sixth of the voters cast a write-in ballot for former California Governor Ronald Reagan.

== March 3, 1976 (Wednesday) ==
- Police in Spain fired into a crowd of Basque demonstrators in Vitoria-Gasteiz, the capital of the Basque region, killing five and wounding 150. The National Police Corps used tear gas against striking workers, before it began firing.
- Carlsbad Skatepark, the first facility in the U.S. state of California to be designed for skateboarding, opened in the San Diego suburb of Carlsbad, California.
- Born: Natalia Kukulska, Polish pop music singer; in Warsaw

== March 4, 1976 (Thursday) ==
- The Maguire Seven, members of a family resident in West Kilburn, London, UK, were found guilty of possessing explosives used in IRA terrorist activity; their sentences would eventually be reversed in 1991.
- Winegrowers in the French village of Arquettes-en-Val rioted over the importation of "cheap Italian and Spanish wines" by France, and fought a gun battle with police that killed one civilian and one policeman; 29 people were injured, most of them police. The funeral for Emile Pouytes, a 52-year old winemaker who was killed in the gunfight, was attended by 10,000 people. The policeman killed was Captain Joel Ligoff.
- The United States Senate narrowly voted, 47 to 46, to reject a resolution that would have declared the 1974 U.S. Senate race for Oklahoma in doubt, clearing the way for Henry Bellmon, a Republican, to begin a second term, after nine Democrats join the Senate's 37 Republican Senators. Oklahoma had had only one U.S. Senator since January 1975 because of doubts over whether Bellmon or Democrat Ed Edmondson had won the race.
- In the first criminal indictment of an airline on charges relating to an accident, a federal grand jury in New York brought charges against Pan American World Airways and four other companies for the November 3, 1973 crash of a Boeing 707 cargo plane, in which the three-man crew was killed.
- The United Nations Statistics Division announced that the number of people on Earth would reach a population of almost eight billion by the year 2010 if the present 1.9% annual growth rate continued, more than double the population of 3,890,000,000 reported for 1974. In the 35 years that followed, the growth rate would be slowed somewhat by increased education on and availability of contraception, and the United Nations Population Fund would record the world's population at 6.9 billion people in 2010, with recognition of reaching 7,000,000,000 people as of October 31, 2011 and a forecast of 2027 as the year to top eight billion people.
- The Medal of Honor was presented to three American officers who had been prisoners of war during the Vietnam War, U.S. Navy Vice Admiral James Stockdale, U.S. Air Force Captain George "Bud" Day, and, posthumously, to U.S. Air Force 2nd Lieutenant Lance Sijan.
- Born: Mohsen Namjoo, Iranian film score composer; in Torbat-e Jam, Razavi Khorasan Province
- Died: Walter H. Schottky, 89, German physicist

== March 5, 1976 (Friday) ==
- For the first time in history, the value of the British pound sterling was worth less than two United States dollars. At 2:39 in the afternoon, the milestone was crossed on the London Stock Exchange and as of closing, the worth of £1.00 was $1.975.
- On the final day of the 25th Congress of the Communist Party of the Soviet Union, the composition of the ruling Communist Party Politburo was changed by vote of the Central Committee. The most notable alteration was the removal of the Soviet Minister of Agriculture, Dmitry Polyansky, from the 15 full members of the Politburo, apparently because of the failure of the 1975 grain harvest. New full members, both promoted from candidate member status, were General Dmitry Ustinov and 53-year-old Leningrad Party Secretary Grigory Romanov, raising the number of Politburo members to 16.
- Mohamed Lamine Ahmed was named as the first head of government for the Saharan Arab Democratic Republic, declared in February by Polisario Front guerrillas who were fighting for independence of the area, recently annexed by Morocco after the withdraw of Spanish colonial forces.
- With the inflation rate in Argentina now equivalent to 240% per annum, the government of the South American republic announced a new devaluation of the Argentine peso. Formally valued at 76 pesos to a dollar, the new rate was 250 pesos.
- Toni Innauer of Austria set a world record for the longest ski jump, at 571 feet (174 m) in West Germany at Oberstdorf. Two days later, he broke his own world record with a jump of 577 feet (176 m).

== March 6, 1976 (Saturday) ==
- All 111 people on board Aeroflot Flight 909 were killed when the airplane crashed while flying from Moscow to the Armenian SSR capital at Yerevan. The Ilyushin Il-18 jet crashed at night near Verkhnyaya Khava in the Soviet Union after an electrical fault caused the failure of several major instruments, including the compass, the main gyroscopes and the autopilot, causing the crew to lose control.

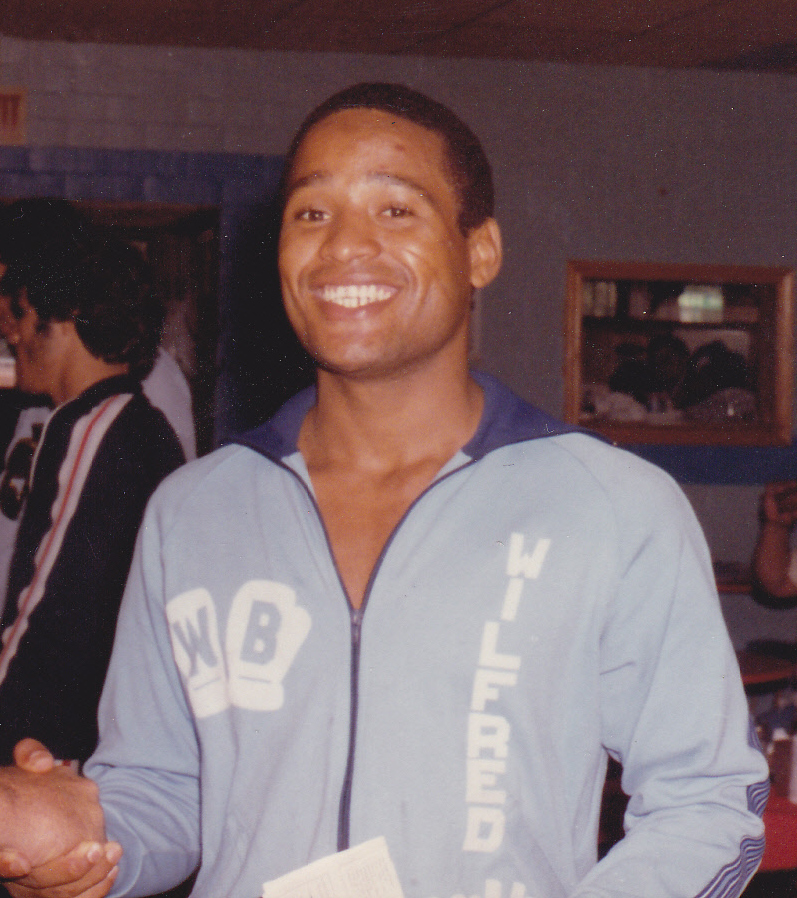
Benitez

- Wilfred Benitez, a 17-year-old American high school student, won the World Boxing Association light welterweight championship when he defeated Antonio Cervantes in a bout in San Juan, Puerto Rico, becoming the youngest professional boxing world champion in history.
- Nigerian Army Lieutenant Colonel B. S. Dimka, was arrested after a three week-long manhunt and charged with treason for the February 13 assassination of President Murtala Muhammed and the attempted overthrow of the government. He would be executed on May 15.
- The South African Grand Prix took place at the Kyalami circuit near Johannesburg, and was won by Niki Lauda.
- Died: Maxie Rosenbloom, 68, American light heavyweight boxing champion 1930 to 1934, later a TV actor

== March 7, 1976 (Sunday) ==
- India's government released opposition leader Charan Singh, who had been under house arrest for more than eight months since Prime Minister Indira Gandhi had declared a state of emergency. Singh would later become the Prime Minister of India for a brief period in 1979 and 1980.
- Eight high school students from Minster, Ohio, were killed and four injured when a car plowed into them while they were walking on a road in Mercer County. The dead and injured had been among 50 students from Minster High School who had been traveling together in several cars to go to a dance.
- The nucleus of Comet West, which had made its closest approach to the Sun on February 25, split into two fragments while being observed from the Earth by astronomers, apparently having been affected by the Sun's gravitational field.
- Born:
  - Brittany Daniel and Cynthia Daniel, American TV and film actresses known as the stars of the Fox and UPN television series Sweet Valley High; in Gainesville, Florida
  - Roman Sakin, Russian sculptor; in Kursk, Russian SFSR, Soviet Union
- Died:
  - Wright Patman, 82, the oldest member of the U.S. House of Representatives and Congressman for Texas since 1929.
  - General Nam Il, 60, Vice Premier of North Korea and former Minister of Foreign Affairs, in a car accident
  - Jacques Duboin, 97, French economist who pioneered the theory of "distributive economy"
  - Ivan Borkovský, 78, Ukrainian-born Czech archaeologist

== March 8, 1976 (Monday) ==
- A meteor shower of over 100 extraterrestrial objects took place over China with large meteorites falling over an area of 193 square miles (500 km^{2}) in the Jilin province in Manchuria, with one weighing 3,894 pounds (1,766 kg), the largest ever to have been observed during its descent.
- Researchers at Mount Sinai Hospital in New York City announced that asbestos fibers been discovered in nine of 19 brands of baby powder and body powder made from talc. According to the research team, ZBT Baby Powder and four body powders concentration of asbestos fibers ranging from 8% to 20%, and one powder taken off the market, Bauer & Black Baby Talc, had a 15% concentration.
- South Korea's President Park Chung-hee ordered the arrest of two of his most vocal critics, Kim Dae-jung (who had run against Park in the 1971 South Korean presidential election) and former Foreign Minister Jeong Il-hyeong, after both had signed a declaration a week earlier calling on President Park to restore democracy, free political prisoners, and then to resign. In a statement, the government declared that "By publicly agitating for the subversion of the Government, they have infringed upon the basic constitutional order."
- Several hundred thousand workers in Spain's Basque provinces walked off of their jobs in the largest protest in Spain since the Spanish Civil War ended in 1939. One Spanish news agency estimated that 325,000 laborers walked off of their jobs in the provinces of Álava, Guipuzcoa, Vizcaya and Navarre.
- Three construction workers were killed while preparing for the 1976 Summer Olympics in Montreal while working on the Olympic Stadium, when a concrete slab broke from its supporting cables and caused them to fall 100 feet (30 m) to their deaths. A construction accident the year before had killed another construction worker.
- Born: Freddie Prinze Jr., American film actor, in Los Angeles
- Died:
  - Pauline de Rothschild, 66, American fashion designer
  - Alfonso Gatto, 66, Italian poet and author
  - Romer Zane Grey, 66, American film animator and author

== March 9, 1976 (Tuesday) ==
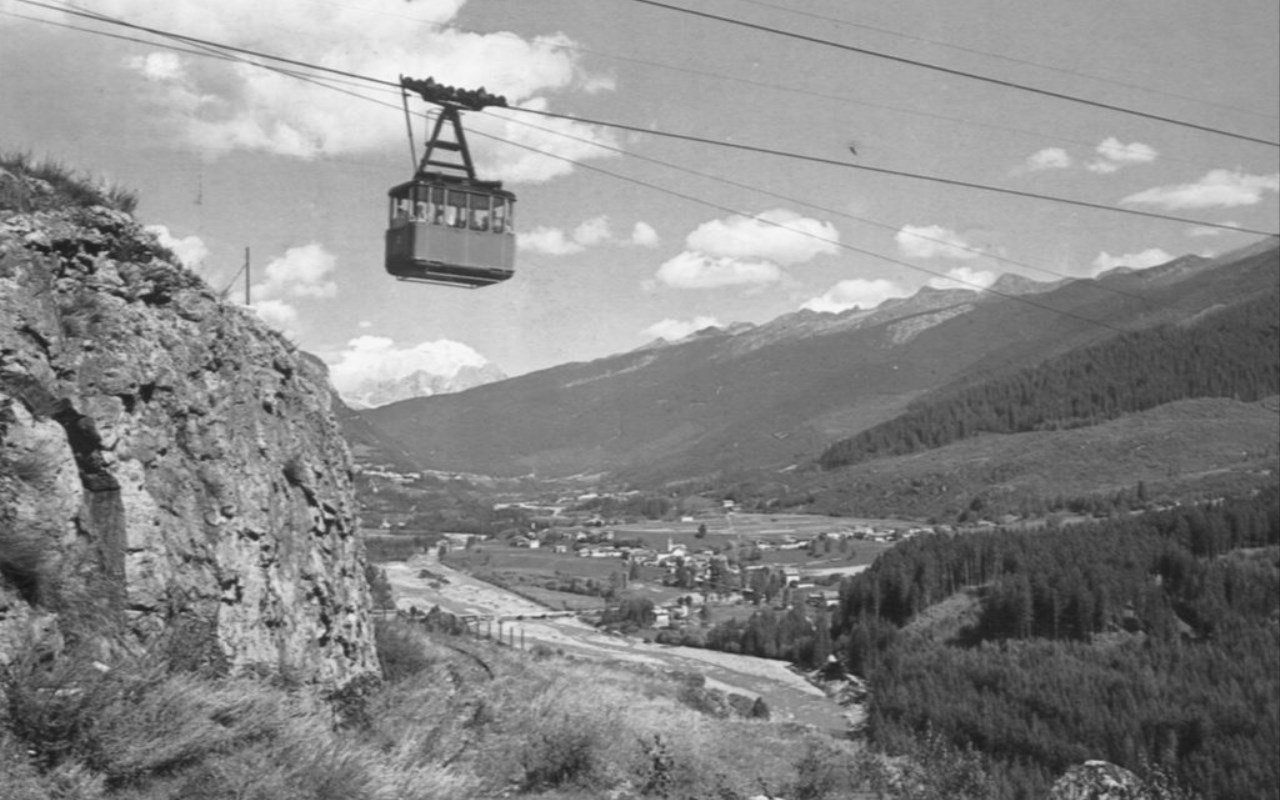
The aerial cable car before the disaster

- Forty-three people were killed at an Italian ski resort in Cavalese in the worst aerial cable tramway disaster in recorded history, after one of the supporting cables broke, causing the vehicle to fall from a height of 660 feet (200 m). A 14-year-old girl, Alessandra Piovesana, one of 16 children on board, survived the fall.
- The Northern Ireland Constitutional Convention was officially dissolved, and direct rule of Northern Ireland from London resumed.
- In Letcher County, Kentucky in the United States, an explosion in the Scotia mine killed 15 coal miners. Almost 150 miners were underground when the explosion happened at 1:15 in the afternoon five miles inside the mine, and all but the 15 got out. The bodies of the miners were left inside pending the clearing of methane gas.
- Born: Isabel Granada, Filipino film and TV actress; in Manila (d. 2017)

== March 10, 1976 (Wednesday) ==
- New Mexico's popular scuba diving location, the Blue Hole, was closed permanently to tourists after two student divers became separated from the rest of the group while in the underwater caverns. Both were later found dead, having run out of oxygen while deep inside the cave system.
- British Prime Minister Harold Wilson's proposed budget, which featured a cut in public spending of three-billion pounds ($6 billion USD), failed to pass the House of Commons, with a vote of 256 for and 284 against, after 37 left-wing members of Wilson's Labour Party abstained from voting and two others joined Conservative Party members of parliament to vote against the measure. When the result was announced, Conservative Party leader Margaret Thatcher called upon Wilson to resign and was joined by fellow MPs who chanted "Out! Out!" as Wilson walked out of the chamber.
- Died:
  - Haddon Sundblom, 76, Swedish-American artist
  - Sammy Smyth, 45, Northern Ireland loyalist and co-founder of the Ulster Defence Association, was shot and killed by the Provisional Irish Republican Army

== March 11, 1976 (Thursday) ==
- British Prime Minister Harold Wilson survived a vote of confidence, 297 to 280, after 37 left-wing members of his Labour Party abstained from the vote. The night before, Wilson's economic program had been rejected by a margin of 28 votes, leading to the second vote on whether the House of Commons still had confidence in his government.
- The government of Israel published its eminent domain plan for government annexation of lands in territories captured from Jordan in 1967 in the Six-Day War.
- Lebanese Army Brigadier General Abdel Aziz al-Ahdab attempted a military coup, appeared on national television, and proclaimed himself to be the "Military Governor of Lebanon", demanding the resignations of both the Christian President and the Muslim Prime Minister within 24 hours. President Suleiman Franjieh refused to step down, and Genearal Ahdab made no effort to overthrow him.
- A second explosion at the Scotia mine in Letcher County, Kentucky, killed a further 11 workers. The second group killed had volunteered to enter the coal mine to remove the bodies of 15 miners who had been killed two days earlier. For more than eight months, the bodies of the last 11 victims of the Scotia mine explosion would remain entombed until November 19, when the remains were brought to the surface.
- Oil was discovered in the Philippines after undersea drilling off of the coast of Palawan Island
- The State University of Surakarta (Universitas Negeri Surakarta or UNS), was founded in the city of Surakarta in Indonesia. Forty years later, it would have an enrollment of 34,000 students. It would later be referred to as "Sebelas Maret" (literally "Eleven March") University.
- In the aftermath of the February 13 assassination of Nigeria's President, General Murtala Muhammed, 31 Nigerian military officers were convicted of conspiracy and executed by firing squad, including the former Defense Minister, Major General Illiya Bisalla.
- Died: Samuel R. Quiñones, 72, Puerto Rican politician, former Speaker of the House of Representatives of Puerto Rico and former President of the Senate of Puerto Rico

== March 12, 1976 (Friday) ==
- The government of India took control of the state of Gujarat, placing it under President's Rule and suppressing the last or India's 22 states that had had a government opposed to Prime Minister Indira Gandhi. The takeover followed a no confidence vote against Gujarat's Chief Minister, Babubhai Patel.
- King Carl XVI Gustaf of Sweden, a 29-year old bachelor, announced his engagement to a commoner from West Germany, Silvia Renate Sommerlath.
- Born: Zhao Wei, Chinese singer and actress; in Wuhu, Anhui province

== March 13, 1976 (Saturday) ==
- In Lebanon, members of the Chamber of Deputies voted, 66 to 0, to remove President Suleiman Franjieh from office, with the other 33 members not present. At the presidential palace, Franjieh told a seven-man delegation from the parliament that "I will leave only if they carry me out dead." Franjieh would remain in power until the expiration of his six-year term on September 22.
- A magnitude 5.4 earthquake killed four people and injured 50 in Guatemala, five weeks after a deadlier quake.
- Born: Danny Masterson, American actor and convicted rapist; in Long Island, New York
- Died: Ole Haugsrud, 76, American professional sports executive who had been the owner of the Duluth Eskimos in the National Football League in the 1920s, and later became a co-founder of the NFL's Minnesota Vikings and 10% owner in 1961.

== March 14, 1976 (Sunday) ==
- Arlene Hiss became the first woman to drive in a major auto race, the day after qualifying for the first event of the 1976 United States Auto Club, the Jimmy Bryan 150 at the Phoenix International Raceway in Avondale, Arizona. Hiss finished in 14th place out of 22 drivers, in a race won by Indianapolis 500 winner Bobby Unser.
- Egypt's President Anwar Sadat announced in a televised address that the 1971 treaty of friendship between Egypt and the Soviet Union would be abrogated, marking the first break between his nation and the Communist nations. Sadat, who had signed the 15-year pact on May 27, 1971, denounced the Soviets for refusing to provide new weapons or replacement parts for military equipment. On April 4, he confirmed that he had canceled the rights of the Soviet Navy to use Egypt's Mediterranean ports at Port Said, Alexandria and Mersa Matruh.
- In the second round of France's regional council elections, the Socialist Party won 194 seats for a total of 475 of the 1,863 races being decided.
- Born: S. Suresh Babu, Indian atmospheric scientist and expert on atmospheric particulate matter and aerosols; in Kerala state
- Died: Busby Berkeley (Berkeley William Enos), 80, American film director and choreographer

== March 15, 1976 (Monday) ==
- Beginning at 6:00 in the morning local time, the city of Los Angeles became the first in the U.S. to designate a high-occupancy vehicle lane (commonly called a "car-pool lane" or the "diamond lane") during the "rush hour" periods (6 am to 10 am and 3 pm to 7 pm), beginning with the Santa Monica Freeway, where the "fast lane" of the east and west freeways were off limits to vehicles that were occupied only by a driver. The objective of the program, which was soon followed on other multi-lane highways, was to encourage people to use public transportation or go to and from work with fellow employees as part of a private carpool.
- An attempt to overthrow the government of the West African nation of Niger failed as Sanoussi Jackou led a coup attempt against President, General Seyni Kountché. Jackou was arrested on May 20 and imprisoned for 11 years until after the death of President Kountché in 1987.
- In Argentina, the Montoneros terrorist group detonated a bomb at Army headquarters, killing one person and injuring a further 29.
- The hard rock band Kiss released their hit album Destroyer, their fourth and their best-selling album up to that time, selling half a million copies within one month (and being certified "gold" by the RIAA on April 22). The album included the band's heavy metal classic "Detroit Rock City" and its biggest commercial hit song, the ballad "Beth".
- Born: Lee Min-woo, South Korean television actor; in Seoul

== March 16, 1976 (Tuesday) ==
- UK Prime Minister Harold Wilson unexpectedly resigned at the age of 60, claiming mental and physical exhaustion; in later years, there would be speculation that Wilson had been aware of having early symptoms of Alzheimer's disease.
- Born:
  - Zhu Chen, Chinese chess grandmaster; in Wenzhou
  - Kōsuke Tamura, Japanese shogi grandmaster; in Uozu, Toyama
  - Iryna Gurevych, Soviet-born German computer scientist; in Vinnytsia, Ukrainian SSR, USSR
  - Jason Rezaian, U.S. journalist for The Washington Post who was temporarily incarcerated in Iran after being accused and convicted of espionage; in San Rafael, California

== March 17, 1976 (Wednesday) ==
- A second trial was ordered by the New Jersey Supreme Court for boxer Rubin Carter and his associate John Artis, who were originally convicted of murder in 1967.
- For the first time since 1947, when the Italian Communist Party had been ousted from a coalition government, the Prime Minister of Italy consulted with an Italian Communist leader, as Aldo Moro met with PCI General Secretary Enrico Berlinguer as part of an emergency meeting with the leaders of all of Italy's political parties on saving the Italian lira and averting a collapse of the nation's economy. Eventually, an alliance between Moro's Democrazia Cristiana (DC) party and the Partito Comunista Italiano (PCI) would become known as the Il Compromesso storico (the "Historic Compromise").
- Four civilians were killed in Northern Ireland, and almost 50 others injured, by the explosion of a terrorist car bomb placed by the Ulster Volunteer Force (UVF) outside the Hillcrest Bar in Dungannon. The bombing was timed for 8:20 p.m. to coincide with Saint Patrick's Day celebrations taking place inside the pub. Two 13-year old boys, James McCaughey and Patrick Barnard, who had been preparing to cross the street were killed.
- Born: Stephen Gately, Irish pop singer and children's author known for The Tree of Seasons, member of Boyzone; in Dublin (d. from cardiopulmonary edema, 2009)
- Died: Luchino Visconti, 69, Italian theatre, opera and film director, from a stroke

== March 18, 1976 (Thursday) ==
- After an emergency meeting between Prime Minister Aldo Moro and leaders of Italy's other political parties, the Italian government announced increased taxes and restrictions on money lending as part of a program of austerity measures in order to fight a 12% annual inflation rate and a 25% decline in the Italian lira in the first two months of 1976.
- After two attempts by the Irish Republican Army to explode bombs in London's Underground, Scotland Yard assigned 1,000 police to patrol the train cars and the stations of the Underground. The move came days after nine people were injured and a train engineer shot dead in an attack at the West Ham railway station in East London.
- For the first time in the history of the United States Naval Academy at Annapolis, Maryland, women were appointed to the formerly all-male institution. The Academy announced the names of seven females as the first 247 students to be admitted for the 1976-1977 term, to begin on July 6. The U.S. Secretary of the Navy has authorized appointment of 80 women to be among the expected 1,250 plebes for the class of 1980. In alphabetical order, the women named were Elizabeth Belzer, Donna J. Bueter, Peggy S. Derry, Maureen P. Foley, Bonnie J. Schaefer, Patricia A. Thudium and Barbara A. Webb.
- The U.S. state of Kentucky ratifies the Thirteenth Amendment to the United States Constitution, more than 110 years after the amendment, abolishing slavery, had become effective in all states. The resolution (which also gives Kentucky's ratification to the 14th and 15th Amendments), sponsored by state representative Mae Street Kidd, one of three African-American members of the state legislature, passed 77 to 0 in the state house and by voice vote in the state senate, before being signed by Governor Julian Carroll. Mrs. Kidd had filed the resolution during debate over whether to rescind the state's ratification of the proposed Equal Rights Amendment, after discovering that Kentucky had never approved the three constitutional amendments. With the ratification by Kentucky, Mississippi was left as the only U.S. state not to have ratified the 13th, 14th and 15th amendments.
- Born:
  - Dávid Kovács, right-wing Hungarian politician and founder of the "Jobbik" (Hungarian language for "Better" in an abbreviation for Movement for a Better Hungary) political party; in Budapest
  - FanFan (stage name for Christine Fan), Taiwanese-American Mandarin Chinese-language singer and songwriter; in Columbus, Ohio
- Died:
  - Emmanuel Lacaba, 27, Filipino poet and dissident, was killed along with three other dissidents by the Integrated Civilian Home Defense Forces paramilitary group near the city of Asuncion, Davao del Norte

== March 19, 1976 (Friday) ==
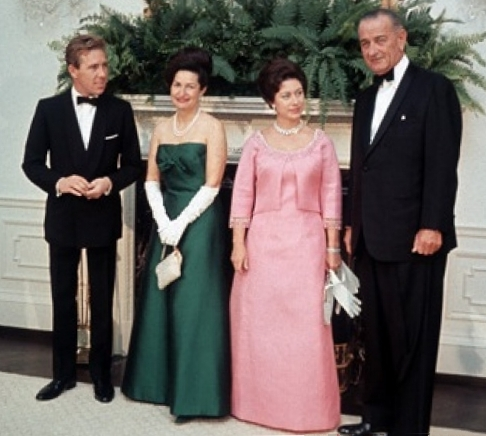
Princess Margaret and Lord Snowdon with the U.S. President and Mrs. Johnson in 1965

- After a long period of speculation, it was announced from Kensington Palace that Princess Margaret, sister of Queen Elizabeth II of the United Kingdom, was separating from her husband Lord Snowdon, after 16 years of marriage. Kensington Palace spokespersons state that the couple "have mutually agreed to live apart. The Princess will carry out her public duties and functions unaccompanied by Lord Snowdon. There are no plans for divorce proceedings."
- Two of the largest American labor unions in clothing manufacture, the Amalgamated Clothing Workers of America (ACWA) and the Textile Workers Union of America (TWUA), agreed to merge to form the Amalgamated Clothing and Textile Workers Union (ACTWU), with 500,000 members. The new organization was the largest clothing workers union in the U.S., surpassing the International Ladies Garment Workers Union (ILGWU), with which it would merge in 1995.
- An assassination attempt was made on Lebanon's Prime Minister Rashid Karami and other high-ranking officials of Lebanon and Syria, after the Syrian Air Force Yak-40 airplane transporting them was hit by gunfire while preparing to take off from the Beirut airport to fly to Damascus. Others on board the jet were former prime minister Saeb Salam, Syrian Military Police director Ali al-Madani, and a member of the Syrian-backed Palestinian guerrilla organization As Saiqa. The group escaped the burning plane, which had been hit by incendiary bullets or a rocket-propelled grenade fired from the adjacent village of Ouzai.
- The 67th Milan–San Remo cycle race was won by Eddy Merckx.
- Born:
  - Rusty Varenkamp, American gospel music singer and producer; in San Jose, California
  - Derek Chauvin, Minneapolis, Minnesota city policeman convicted of the 2020 murder of George Floyd; in Oakdale, Minnesota
- Died: Paul Kossoff, 25, English rock guitarist, from a drug-related pulmonary embolism sustained while on an airplane flight from Los Angeles to New York. Afterwards, Kossoff's father David Kossoff would work for charity in memory of his son.

== March 20, 1976 (Saturday) ==
- Kidnap victim Patty Hearst was convicted of armed robbery and received a 35-year prison sentence. On April 15, 1974, slightly more than two months after being kidnapped from her apartment by the Symbionese Liberation Army terrorist group, Hearst had joined her captors in robbing a branch of the Hibernia Bank in San Francisco. Another judge later reduced the sentence to seven years. U.S. President Jimmy Carter would commute the federal criminal sentence on February 1, 1979 and she would be freed after 22 months.
- The first, and last parliamentary election in the totalitarian nation of Democratic Kampuchea was held as voters were allowed to choose from 515 National United Front candidates for the 250 seats of the Kampuchean People's Representative Assembly. Of the seats, the government reserved 150 for peasants, 50 for factory workers and 50 from the Kampuchean Revolutionary Army. The Assembly then convenes on April 11, 1976.
- The Japanese freighter Senyo Maru sank in rough seas in the Bashi Channel off the coast of Taiwan, killing six of its 24 crew.
- Alice Cooper married choreographer Sheryl Goddard in Acapulco, Mexico.
- The 1976 E3 Harelbeke cycle race was held in Harelbeke, Belgium, and was won by Walter Planckaert.
- Born: Chester Bennington, American rock musician and actor, frontman of Linkin Park; in Phoenix, Arizona (d. 2017)
- Died: Louis Arpels, 89, Dutch-born French jewelry entrepreneur of the Van Cleef & Arpels company of custom made luxury products for celebrities

== March 21, 1976 (Sunday) ==
- In elections for the Sejm, the 460-seat lower house of Poland's parliament, the approved slate of 460 candidates of the Front of National Unity (the 261 from the Communist Polish United Workers' Party (PUWP)), the 113 candidates of the United People's Party (ZSL) and the 37 of the Democratic Alliance (SD), along with 49 non-affiliated candidates, were approved by voters. The official turnout was 98.27% of registered voters.
- The ABC Sunday Night Movie featured the 2-hour pilot for Charlie's Angels, and drew sufficiently high ratings that a one-hour TV series would premiere on September 22 and run for five seasons. TV critics recognized the made-for-TV film as a potential fall series, with comments about the three actresses (Kate Jackson, Farrah Fawcett-Majors and Jaclyn Smith), including, and "The heroines were as distinguishable from each other as railroad ties, and had as much personality."
- Died:
  - Vladimir Peter "Spider" Sabich, 31, American alpine ski-racer and member of the 1968 U.S. Olympic skiing team, was shot and killed in his Aspen, Colorado home by his girlfriend, actress Claudine Longet. Longet, who had formerly been the wife of singer Andy Williams, would be convicted in 1977 of negligent homicide and set free after having spent more than 30 days in jail prior to her trial.
  - Joe Fulks, 54, American professional basketball player and posthumous enshrinee in the Naismith Memorial Basketball Hall of Fame, was shot and killed by Greg Bannister, the son of his girlfriend during an argument. Fulks, an employee of the Kentucky State Penitentiary, was killed at Bannister's home in Eddyville, Kentucky
  - Walter J. Kohler Jr., 72, U.S. politician and former Governor of Wisconsin

== March 22, 1976 (Monday) ==
- Filming of the original Star Wars film began, in the desert of the North African nation of Tunisia, in the area around the Chott el Djerid lake as the film setting for the planet "Tatooine:.
- General Duilio Fanali, the former Chief of Staff of the Italian Air Force, was arrested by police in Rome after an indictment on accusations of accepting a $1.6 million bribe from the Lockheed Aircraft Corporation in return for using his influence to have the 14 C-130 Hercules airplanes purchased by the Italian government.
- In Tokyo, a murder attempt was made against Japanese ultra-right activist Yoshio Kodama, implicated in the Lockheed bribery scandals, when actor Mitsuyasu Maeno crashed an airplane into Kodama's house. Kodama escaped, but Maeno was killed instantly.
- American bank robber Anthony Michael Juliano was arrested only one week after being placed on the FBI's Ten Most Wanted list.
- Born: Reese Witherspoon (Laura Jeanne Reese Witherspoon), American film actress; in New Orleans

== March 23, 1976 (Tuesday) ==
- The International Covenant on Civil and Political Rights entered into force after 35 nations ratified it, and more than nine years after it had been adopted by the United Nations General Assembly on December 19, 1966.
- Norman Bethune Square was inaugurated in Montreal, Canada, commemorating the noted surgeon.
- The Indian Navy Hunt-class destroyer INS Godavari ran aground in the Maldives and was irreparably damaged.
- Former California governor Ronald Reagan won a presidential primary for the first time, winning the Republican primary in North Carolina after incumbent U.S. President Gerald Ford had won the vote in the first five states for the Republican Party nomination for President.
- Born:
  - Sir Chris Hoy, Scottish track cyclist, six titles in Olympic Games, eleven titles in UCI Track Cycling World Championship; in Edinburgh, Scotland, United Kingdom.
  - Keri Russell, American TV and film actress and Golden Globe award winner; in Fountain Valley, California
- Died: General Stanisław Kopański, 80, Polish military officer who had created the Polish Carpathian Brigade in World War II after the fall of Poland to German and Soviet invaders in 1939. The Communist government of Poland had revoked his citizenship in 1946 and he died in exile in London.

== March 24, 1976 (Wednesday) ==
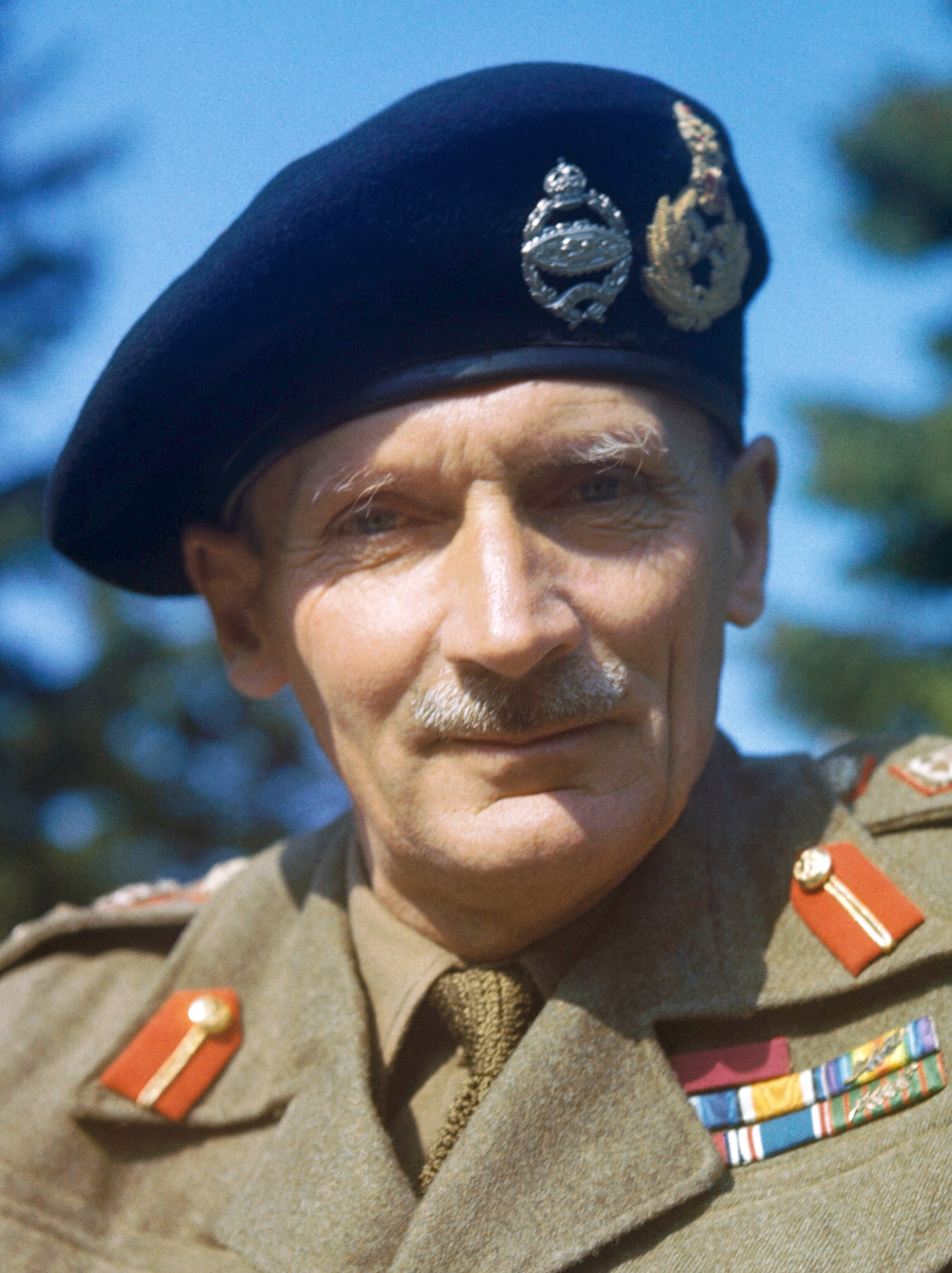
Field Marshal Montgomery

- Isabel Perón, President of Argentina, was deposed in a military coup d'état, after she was detained at an Air Force base in Buenos Aires at the Jorge Newbery International Airport. Mrs. Peron had departed by helicopter from the Casa Rosada, Argentina's government office, to make a trip to a presidential retreat in the Buenos Aires suburb of Olivos. A three-member military junta, led by Argentine Army Lieutenant General Jorge Rafael Videla and supplemented by Admiral Emilio Massera and Air Force Brigadier General Orlando Agosti, assumed control of the South American nation 10 hours later.
- A general strike took place in the People's Republic of the Congo, resulting in the formation of the political movement M 24.
- Died: Field Marshal Bernard Montgomery, 88, British Army commander in World War II.

== March 25, 1976 (Thursday) ==
- The government of South Africa announced that it would be withdrawing its military forces from neighboring Angola over the next two days. Defense Minister P. W. Botha said in a statement that the Angolan government had guaranteed protection of resources on the border between Angola and Namibia (still referred to at the time as South-West Africa and under South African administration. At least 3,000 South African troops had been in Ruacana in Angola guarding the Cunene River hydroelectric and irrigation project.
- In a new development in the Lebanese Civil War between the Middle Eastern nation's Christians and Muslims, the Baabda Palace, the official residence of President Suleiman Franjieh, came under heavy artillery fired from Muslim military forces. President Franjieh and his staff flee to a Christian stronghold 13 miles (21 km) north of Beirut, while another Lebanese Christian leader, Pierre Gemayel, called on men and women to join a militia "so you may save our homeland before it is too late." Kamal Jumblatt, leader of Lebanon's Druze Muslims had joined with dissident Lieutenant Ahmed al-Khatib in beginning the attack to force Franjieh's resignation. Franjieh soon returned and would finish out his six-year term of office in September.
- In the first round of voting among Labour Party members of the House of Commons to elect a successor to outgoing Prime Minister Wilson, none of the six candidates for leadership of Labour attained a majority, but three government ministers— Roy Jenkins, Anthony Wedgwood Benn. and Anthony Crossland dropped out after receiving no more than 56 votes. Employment Secretary Michael Foot had 90 votes, Foreign Secretary James Callaghan 84 and Chancellor the Exchequer Denis Healey would be the three candidates when the second ballot was taken on March 30.
- More than two months after his death, the late Chinese Prime Minister Zhou Enlai was the subject of an attempt to discredit his reputation, as the Shanghai newspaper Wenhui Bao linked him to former Vice Premier Deng Xiaoping. In the article, orchestrated by Jiang Qing, the wife of Chinese Communist Party Chairman Mao Zedong, Zhou was described as "the capitalist roader inside the Party" who had helped rehabilitate Deng (described as an "unrepentant capitalist roader") after the Cultural Revolution. Far from ruining Zhou's reputation, the article and subsequent attacks would reinforce public sympathy for Zhou.
- Born:
  - Wladimir Klitschko, Ukrainian boxer; in Semey
  - Gigi Leung (stage name for Leung Wing-kei), Hong Kong singer and actress; in Sai Ying Pun, British Hong Kong
- Died: Josef Albers, 88, German-born American artist

== March 26, 1976 (Friday) ==
- At least 45 guests at a wedding in India were killed at Pune in the Maharashtra state when a tractor-drawn wagon ran off the road and plunged into a deep canal.
- Queen Elizabeth II of the United Kingdom became the first world leader to send an email from a head of state, after being invited to click upon the command to transmit a message while she and Prince Philip were dedicating the new Royal Signals and Radar Establishment at Malvern in Worcestershire. The email, sent via ARPANET (Advanced Research Projects Agency Network), the predecessor to the Internet was composed by RSRE director Peter T. Kirstein for the occasion, read "This message to all ARPANET users announces the availability on ARPANET of the Coral 66 compiler provided by the GEC 4080 computer at the Royal Signals and Radar Establishment, Malvern, England, ... Coral 66 is the standard real-time high level language adopted by the Ministry of Defence."
- The Toronto Blue Jays baseball team was founded when the American League awarded a franchise to a group consisting of Labatt's Breweries, Imperial Trust, Ltd., and the Canadian Imperial Bank of Commerce. In January, Labatt's had entered into a contract to purchase the San Francisco Giants of the National League to be moved to Toronto. The addition of the Blue Jays, along with new Seattle Mariners expansion franchise, brought the American League to 14 teams for the 1977 season.
- The first store of The Body Shop, a chain of British stores selling cosmetics, skin care and perfume for women, opened in Brighton. More than 40 years later, the company would have 3,000 stores in 65 nations worldwide.
- Nineteen days after 43 skiers were killed in the fall of an aerial cable car in Italy, three people are killed and nine injured at a U.S. ski resort in Vail, Colorado when two gondola cars come off of the overhead cable and fall 100 feet (30 m).
- Died: Lin Yutang, 80, Chinese scholar and philosopher who introduced classic Chinese philosophical texts to the Western nations.

== March 27, 1976 (Saturday) ==
- The Washington Metro, the first underground subway in the U.S. capital, began operation as a 4.6 mi (7.4 km) section opened between Farragut North and Rhode Island Avenue stations.
- The Kingdome opened in Seattle as a multipurpose sports stadium for two new teams that would debut in the next 12 months, the NFL Seattle Seahawks and the MLB Seattle Mariners.
- The explosion of a terrorist bomb injured 85 people in London (one fatally) after having been hidden by the Irish Republican Army inside a trash bin at the Olympia Exhibition Center, where 15,000 people were attending the Ideal Home show.
- Elections were held among the members of India's 15 state legislatures for 82 (one more than one-third) of the seats in the 244-member Rajya Sabha, the upper house of the Parliament of India. The ruling Congress Party of Indira Gandhi gains 18 additional seats, giving it 164 or one more than the 163 needed for a two-thirds majority in the Rajya Sabha, sufficient to amend the Constitution of India.
- With Operation Savannah at an end, the South African Defence Force formally withdrew from Angola.
- The new military junta in Argentina ordered the recall and dismissal of 30 of its ambassadors, including those to Canada, the United Kingdom and the Common Market. Adolfo Vasquez, the Argentine Ambassador to United States, was not removed by the government.
- In the U.S., the women's basketball team from Delta State College of Cleveland, Mississippi, won the championship of the Association for Intercollegiate Athletics for Women (AIAW), as the Lady Statesmen defeated the Mighty Macs of Immaculata College of Philadelphia, 69 to 64, at the Penn State University arena. Lusia Harris of Delta State was the MVP of the tournament, with 27 points and 18 rebounds.
- The University of Minnesota won the NCAA ice hockey championship at Denver, defeating Michigan Tech, 6 to 4.
- The Tampa Bay Rowdies, champions of the North American Soccer League, won the 1976 NASL Indoor tournament in St. Petersburg, Florida, defeating the Rochester Lancers, 6 to 4. In all, 12 of the 20 NASL teams competed in the tournament, the second in the U.S. professional soccer football league's history.
- A 14-year-old gymnast from Romania, Nadia Comaneci, achieved the first perfect 10 rating ever in the U.S. from judges, finishing first in the qualifying round of the American Cup international competition. Relatively unknown outside of Eastern Europe, she won the women's vault event at Madison Square Garden in New York.
- Born: Brandon Johnson, American politician and educator, 57th Mayor of Chicago (since 2023); in Elgin, Illinois
- Died: Mukaghali Makatayev, 45, Soviet Kazakh poet and author

== March 28, 1976 (Sunday) ==
- The Delta State University Lady Statesmen of Cleveland, Mississippi won their second consecutive U.S. women's college basketball championship in a rematch against the three-time AIAW champion (and 1975 runner-up) Immaculata University Mighty Macs of West Chester, Pennsylvania, winning the AIAW women's basketball tournament 69 to 64. The competition was hosted at Penn State University.
- Polish naval engineer Krystyna Chojnowska-Liskiewicz began her quest to become the first woman to sail by herself around the world, departing the Canary Islands in her yacht, the Conrad 32 sloop Mazurek. Chojnowska-Liskiewicz would complete her circumnavigation of the world on April 21, 1978, after having sailed for 401 of 754 days, returning to the Canary Islands after a voyage of 35,865 miles (57,719 km).
- The 1976 United States Grand Prix West, the first ever, was held in Long Beach, California, and was won by Clay Regazzoni. The Formula 1 race was conducted on a 2.02 mile circuit through the streets of Long Beach.

== March 29, 1976 (Monday) ==
- The Hoosiers of Indiana University completed an unbeaten season (31 wins and no losses) and won the NCAA basketball championship with an 86 to 68 defeat of a fellow Big Ten Conference team, the Wolverines of the University of Michigan, in the title game at Philadelphia.
- The Academy Awards were presented at ceremonies in Hollywood. Actor Jack Nicholson, on his fifth Oscar nomination, won for the first time for Best Actor for his role in One Flew Over the Cuckoo's Nest, which also won the award for Best Picture; Nicholson's co-star and antagonist in the film, Louise Fletcher, won Best Actress. George Burns, 78, received the award for Best Supporting Actor (for The Sunshine Boys) and 82-year-old Mary Pickford was presented a special award for service to the film industry as an actress.

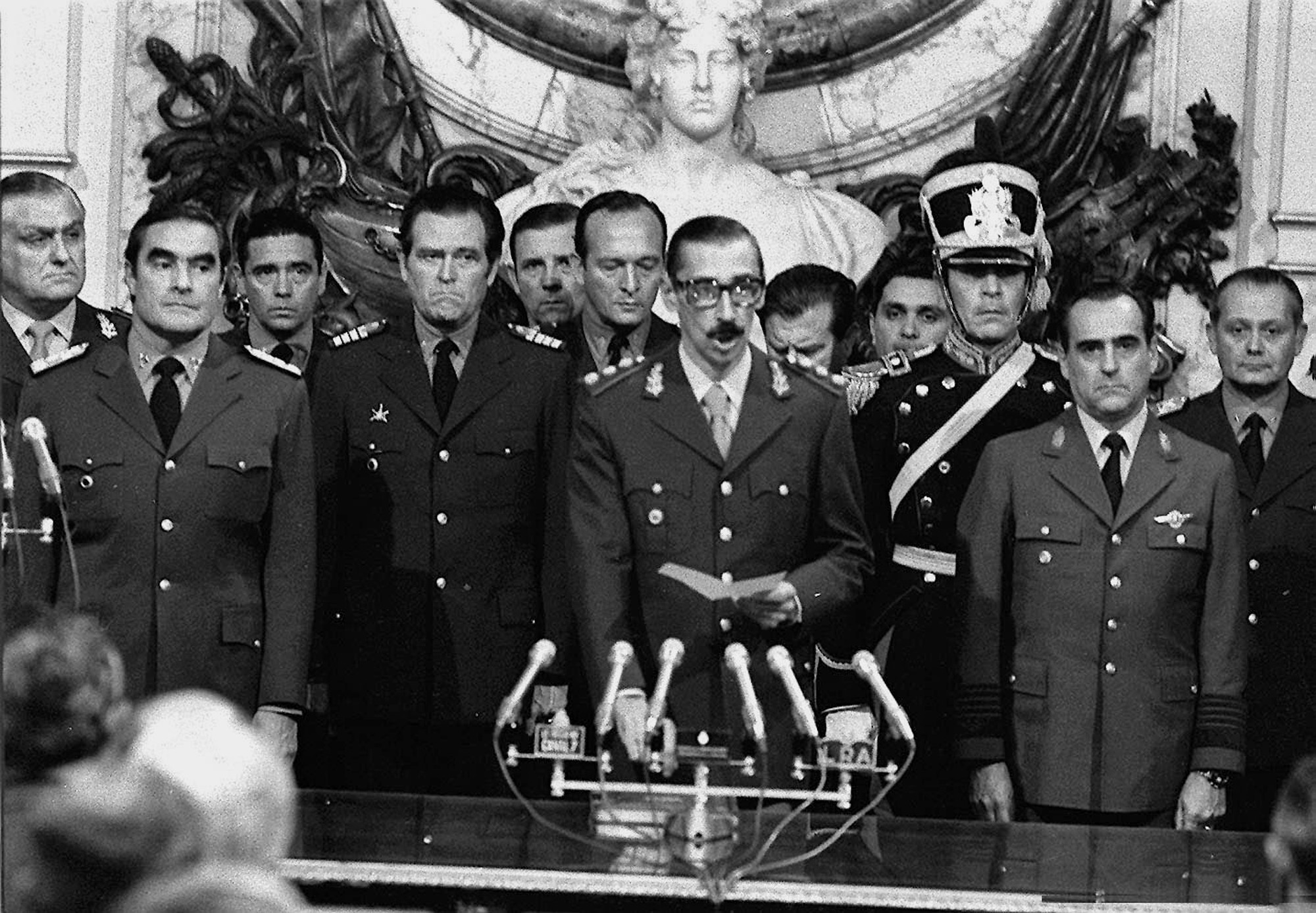
Jorge Rafael Videla swearing the Oath as President of Argentina

- Lieutenant General Jorge Rafael Videla, the chief of staff of the Argentine Army, was sworn into office as the 39th President of Argentina, followed by a cabinet of six military officers and two civilians. One of the civilians, Jose Martinez de Hoz, a corporate business officer, became the Minister of the Economy and named a nine-man team of economic assistants to attempt to solve the problems of Argentina's large foreign debt and runaway inflation.
- Australian farmer Alec Brackstone declared his four hectare (9.9 acre) property in the state of South Australia to be the "Province of Bumbunga", a micronation seeking to be a British colony, with himself as its "Governor-General", then made a living by printing and selling Bumbungan postage stamps until Australian law caused him to abandon the business in 1987.
- Born:
  - Jennifer Capriati, American professional tennis player ranked number one in the world by the Women's Tennis Association on four occasions in 2001 and 2002, winner of the Australian Open (2001 and 2002) and the French Open (2001) women's singles titles; in Wesley Chapel, Florida
  - Kjell-Ole Haune, Norwegian composer of musicals; in Oslo
- Died: Joelito Filártiga, 17, after being kidnapped and tortured in Paraguay by police under the command of by Américo Norberto Peña-Irala. The landmark federal court decision in Filártiga v. Peña-Irala (1980) set a precedent for allowing civil lawsuits to be filed in the U.S. for crimes committed in a foreign nation, if the defendant has taken up residence in the U.S.

== March 30, 1976 (Tuesday) ==
- The events which inspired the annual Land Day demonstration took place in Israel. In confrontations with police in towns in the West Bank, six unarmed Arab citizens of Israel were killed and almost 100 other people wounded. A seventh Israeli Arab had been killed the day before.
- In the second round of balloting in the UK by the 312 Labour Party MPs over the successor to outgoing Prime Minister Harold Wilson, James Callaghan received 141 votes and Michael Foot 133, not enough by either candidate for the necessary majority of 157. The third candidate, Denis Healey, finished with 38 votes and was automatically ineligible for the third round of voting, which would take place on April 5.
- The West End Gang, a group of five armed robbers in Montreal, overpowered the guards of a Brink's armored car outside of the headquarters of the Royal Bank of Canada and escaped with $2.8 million in Canadian dollars ($2.76 million U.S. dollars).
- The Sony corporation of Japan introduced its new product to the U.S., the home videocassette recorder (VCR), with the first advertisements for its Betamax recording system, running a display ad in The New York Times with the headline "Announcing: a new TV recording star!" In the ad copy, Sony told homeowners, "even if you're not there, it records TV programs you don't want to miss, builds a priceless videotape library in no time, $1300." The $1,300 cost of the VCR was equivalent to $6,400 forty-five years later.
- In the U.S., the National Football League began its annual expansion draft, delayed on this occasion because of a lawsuit brought by the owners of the Seattle Seahawks and Tampa Bay Buccaneers against the players' union.

== March 31, 1976 (Wednesday) ==
- The New Jersey Supreme Court ruled that Karen Ann Quinlan, suffering from irreversible brain damage, could be disconnected from the ventilator that had been keeping her alive since April 15, 1975, when she was found unresponsive after a combination of a drug and alcohol overdose. After being disconnected, Quinlan was able to breathe on her own and would live an additional nine years without ever regaining consciousness.
- The United Nations Security Council voted for a resolution that "the act of aggression committed by South Africa against the People's Republic of Angola" required South Africa to pay compensation for war damages.
- The slam dunk, outlawed in college and high school basketball since March 28, 1967, was restored as a legal shot starting with the 1976-77 season.
- The Sallins Train Robbery took place in County Kildare in the Republic of Ireland as five members of the Irish Republican Socialist Party, led by Nicky Kelly, stole approximately IR£200,000 from a train carrying mail between Cork and Dublin.
- The 23-year old British passenger carrier Northeast Airlines (known as BKS Air Transport until 1970) made its last flights before being merged into British Airways
- Died: Paul Strand, 85, pioneering still photo and motion picture photographer
