= February 1976 =

Month of 1976

<<	February 1976					>>
Su	Mo	Tu	We	Th	Fr	Sa
1	2	3	4	5	6	7
8	9	10	11	12	13	14
15	16	17	18	19	20	21
22	23	24	25	26	27	28
29

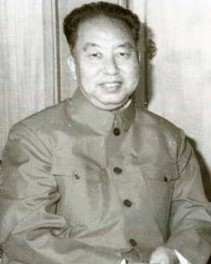
February 7, 1976: Communist China makes surprise choice of Hua Guofeng as new Premier

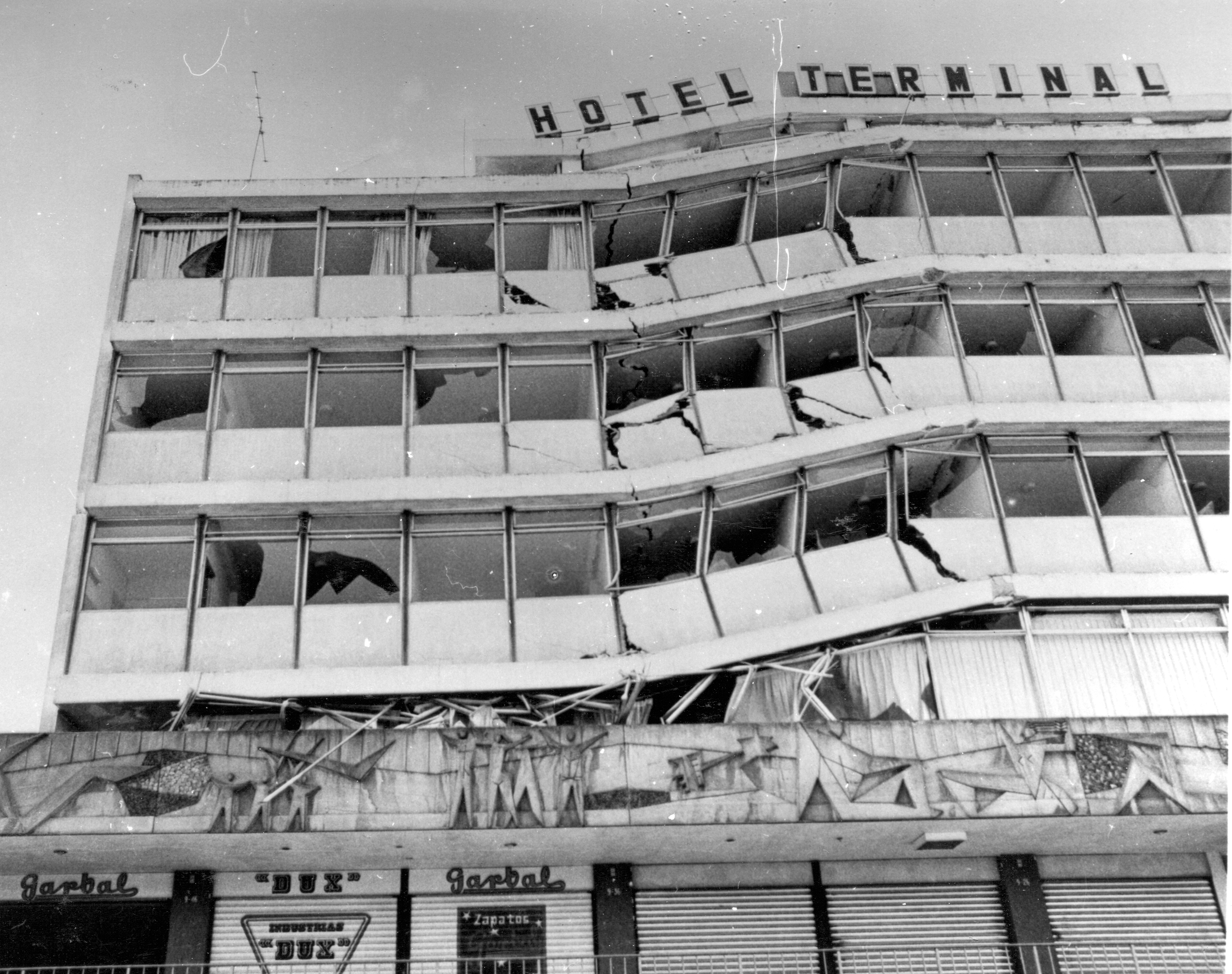
February 4, 1976: 7.5 earthquake kills more than 22,000 in Guatemala

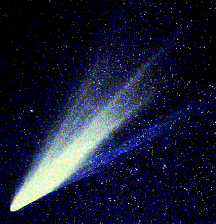
February 25, 1976: Underrated "Comet West" observable in daylight as it approaches the Sun

The following events occurred in February 1976:

== February 1, 1976 (Sunday) ==
- A group of 12 British mercenary soldiers, recruited by "Colonel Tony Callan" (Costas Georgiou) to fight in the Angolan Civil War as part of a group 100 Britons that arrived on January 27, were executed by their fellow Britons on Callan's orders. UK Prime Minister Harold Wilson told the House of Commons on February 9 about the incident after being briefed by MI-5.
- Samachar was formed as the news agency of India by the consolidation of four competing agencies— the Press Trust of India, United News of India, Samachar Bharati and Hindustan Samachar. Operations of the consolidated national news agency began on April 2.
- The government of India, having placed the state of Tamil Nadu under President's rule, arrested hundreds of members of the Dravida Munnetra Kazhagam (DMK) (Dravidian Progress Federation), a political party that was opposed to the rule of Prime Minister Indira Gandhi. Deposed Chief Minister Muthuvel Karunanidhi and his aides transferred government records to incoming appointed government, and they were not arrested.
- Five people were killed when a Rossair chartered airplane collided with a private plane as it approached the airport in Parafield, South Australia north of Adelaide.
- The 24 Hours of Daytona auto endurance race in Daytona Beach, Florida, was halted at 10:10, after nine of the 72 entrants began running into engine trouble from gasoline contaminated by water. After almost three hours, after the tainted fuel was drained and the vehicles refueled, the president of the International Motor Sports Association ruled that the race would be restarted, with all competitors credited as having the number of laps they had completed as of 9:00 in the morning. The team of Peter Gregg and Brian Redman, who had been 16 laps ahead at that hour and were among the cars that had been halted by the tainted fuel, went on to win what one writer described as "one of the most controversial automobile races in history."
- Died:
  - Werner Heisenberg, 74, German nuclear physicist and 1932 Nobel Prize laureate;
  - George Whipple, 97, U.S. physician, co-recipient of the 1934 Nobel Prize in Physiology or Medicine for his finding that pernicious anemia, though incurable, could be controlled by a diet of liver.

== February 2, 1976 (Monday) ==
- Daniel Patrick Moynihan abruptly resigned from his job as the U.S. Ambassador to the United Nations. While initially citing his wish to return to his job as a professor at Harvard University, Moynihan soon showed his real reason for resigning and announced that he would be a candidate for the upcoming Democratic nomination for U.S. Senate for New York.
- David Bowie's Isolar – 1976 Tour, commonly called the "Thin White Duke Tour", opened in Canada at the Pacific Coliseum in Vancouver.
- The SZD-42 Jantar 2 glider made its first flight.
- Died: Barbara Euphan Todd, 86, English children's author known for creating "Worzel Gummidge"

== February 3, 1976 (Tuesday) ==
- Nigeria's head of state, General Murtala Muhammed, announced the reorganization of the western African republic, with the division of five of the existing 12 states to create a total of 19, "to bring government nearer to the people", and said that a new federal capital would be built to house the government located in Lagos. Divided were the Western State (split into Ogun, Ondo and Oyo); the North-Western State (Niger and Sokoto); the North-Eastern State (Bauchi, Borno and Gongola); the East Central State (Anambra and Imo); and the state of Benue-Plateau (Benue and Plateau). The capital was relocated to the Lagos suburb of Ikeja. Because of events 10 days later, General Murtala did not live to see the construction of the new planned city, Abuja, for the federal capital.
- Four gunmen, seeking independence for the French Territory of the Afars and Issas (now the Republic of Djibouti), seized a school bus in the African city of Djibouti and took the driver, a chaperone and 29 French children as hostages. The group was then transported by the guerrillas to the town of Loyada, on the border with Somalia. French Army sharpshooters rescued 28 of the children the next day, killing the six guerrillas holding the hostages, but not before one of the dying assailants fires an automatic weapon, killing a schoolgirl and wounding two adults and four children. Before the rescue, the kidnappers had taken one of the children across the border into Somalia and held him for ransom. The child, 7-year-old Frank Rutkowski, was released, unharmed, by the guerrillas to the Somali government. On February 7 in Mogadishu, Somalia's Foreign Minister Omar Arteh Ghalib handed Frank over to the French Ambassador.
- The government of Mozambique, led by President Samora Machel, announced the nationalization of all rental housing in the southeast African nation and a ban against the construction of additional buildings for the purpose of rental. Private ownership of houses was still allowed, but charging a fee for the right of usage of the property was forbidden. On the same day, Machel ordered the name of the Mozambican capital to be changed from its Portuguese designation of Lourenço Marques. Machel announced at a rally, "At 9:35 today, Lourenço Marques died; our capital was called Maputo."
- A settlement was made in the antitrust lawsuit Robertson v. National Basketball Association, almost six years after the suit had been filed by Oscar Robertson and 13 other NBA players against the league and its teams. The settlement cleared the way for a merger with the rival American Basketball Association (ABA). Merger discussions had been enjoined by order of the U.S. District Court for the Southern District of New York pending a determination of whether a merged league would constitute a monopoly on the sport of professional basketball.
- The Daily Mail, a London tabloid, made public the "Thorpe affair" that ultimately forced the resignation of Liberal Party leader Jeremy Thorpe. The Daily Mail interview with Peter Bessell, a former member or the House of Commons and colleague of Thorpe, brought evidence that Thorpe had had a homosexual affair with Norman Scott and that Thorpe then conspired to have Scott killed.
- Born:
  - Isla Fisher, Australian actress; in Muscat.
  - Tim Heidecker, American comedian and film actor, known for the comedy duo Tim & Eric; in Allentown, Pennsylvania.

== February 4, 1976 (Wednesday) ==
- In Guatemala, a 7.5 magnitude earthquake killed at least 22,000 people. With an epicenter between the towns of Siquinalá and Escuintla, the quake struck at 3:01 in the morning local time and caused its highest death toll in slum areas of Guatemala City.

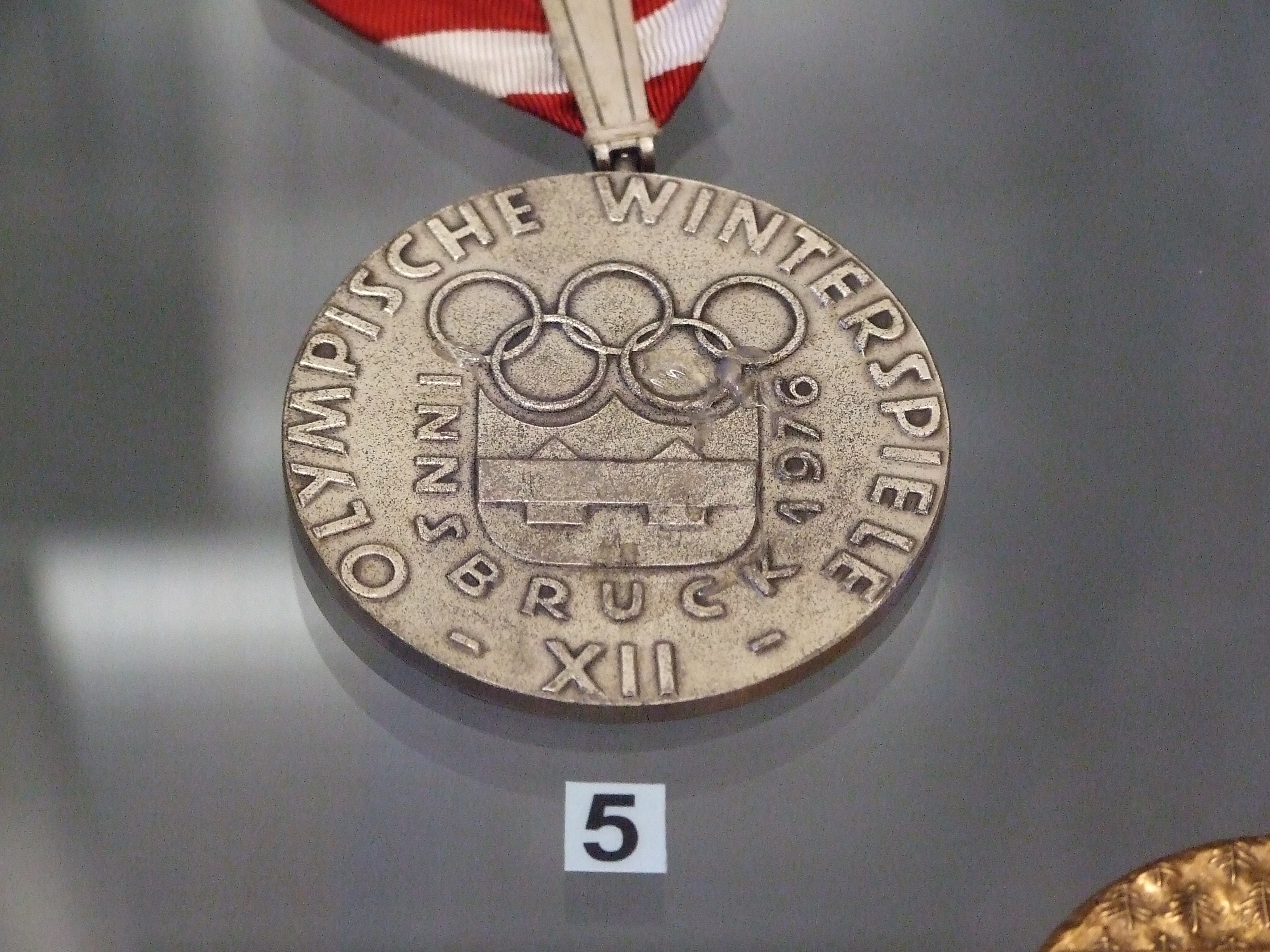
A silver medal from the 1976 Winter Olympics

- The opening ceremonies for the 1976 Winter Olympics were held in Innsbruck in Austria. Austrians Christl Haas and Josef Feistmantl, both gold medalists in the 1964 Winter Olympics at Innsbruck, jointly lit the Olympic torch.
- Reversing a previous ban against allowing the Concorde supersonic airliner to fly to the United States, U.S. Secretary of Transportation William T. Coleman announced that the UK and France could operate Concorde flights to and from John F. Kennedy International Airport in New York City, and Dulles International Airport in Washington, D.C., on a 16-month trial basis.
- The Lok Sabha, India's lower house of parliament, voted to postpone nationwide elections that had been scheduled to start on March 18, as Prime Minister Indira Gandhi's "emergency rule" continued.
- The Communist government of "Democratic Kampuchea" announced a date of March 20 for elections for the new "Cambodian People's Representative Assembly", with all 250 candidates to be selected by the Khmer Rouge government.
- Japan attempted to launch its first x-ray astronomy satellite, CORSA-a (Cosmic Radiation Satellite), but the rocket carrying the payload failed shortly after its liftoff from the Kagoshima Space Center. On February 21, 1979, the replacement (CORSA-b, called "Hakucho"), would be put into orbit.
- South Korea's Construction Minister Kim Jae-gyu was appointed by President Park Chung-hee to be the new director of the Korean Central Intelligence Agency (KCIA). The choice by President Park was ultimately fatal; Lieutenant General Kim would shoot and kill President Park on October 26, 1979.
- The Supreme Court of Nova Scotia ruled that individual provinces could not censor movies, overturning the regulation of film by the provincial government. The decision would later be affirmed by the Supreme Court of Canada.
- The Rolladen-Schneider LS3 made its maiden flight.
- Died: Kuzgun Acar, 47, Turkish modern sculptor, died from an intracerebral hemorrhage sustained after falling from a ladder while working on a relief mural

== February 5, 1976 (Thursday) ==
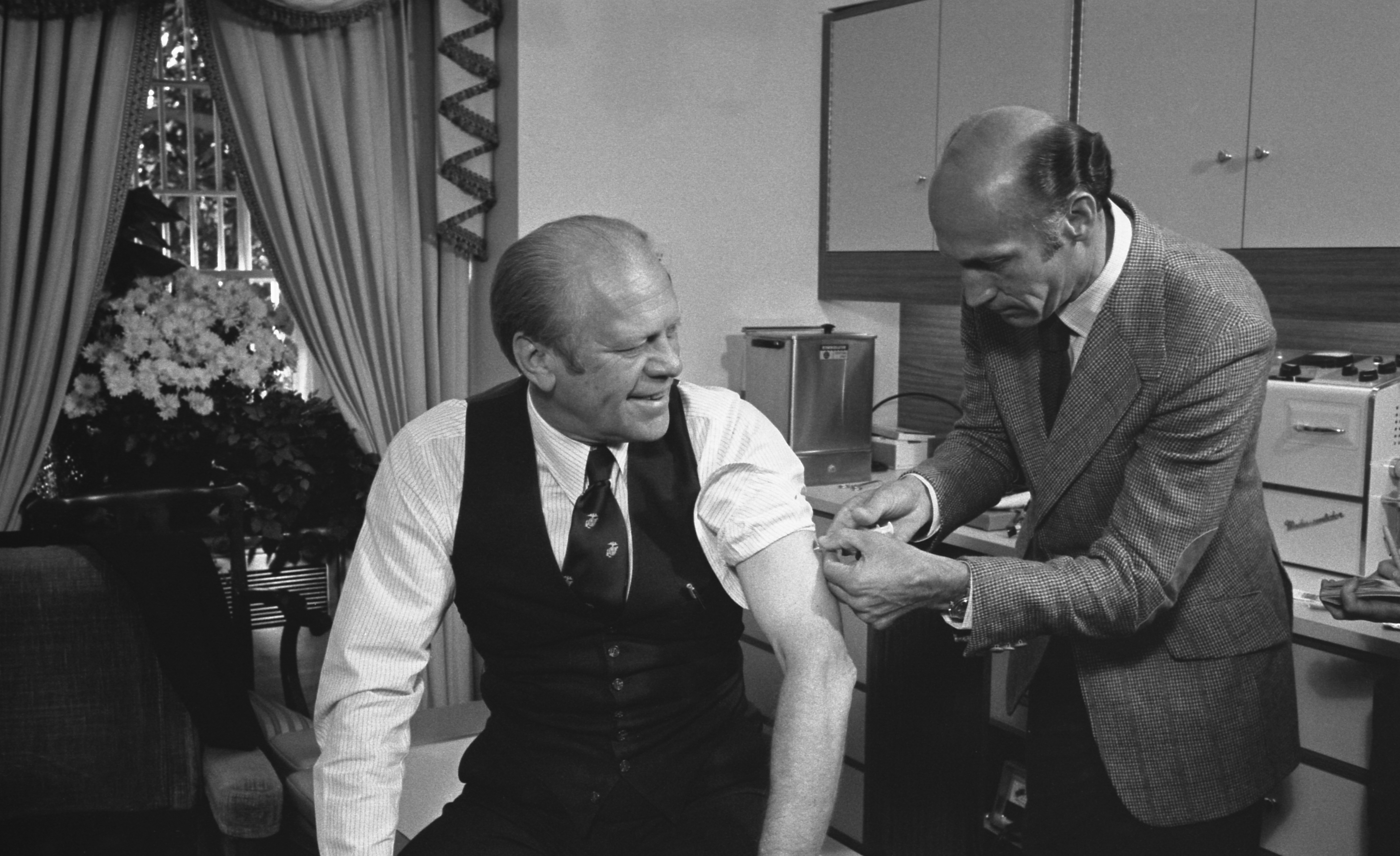
U.S. President Ford being vaccinated against the Swine Flu, October 14, 1976

- A United States Army recruit at Fort Dix died in mysterious circumstances, and four fellow soldiers were hospitalized for a new strain of influenza, H1N1, referred to in the press as "swine flu". A spokesman for the Center for Disease Control (CDC) announced that a new strain of the influenza virus, "swine flu", was the cause. Soon after, public health officials in President Ford's administration urged that every person in the United States be vaccinated.
- U.S. President Ford signed the Railroad Revitalization and Regulatory Reform Act into law to create the Consolidated Rail Corporation to operate freight trains in the northeastern United States, purchasing the railway lines of seven bankrupt companies: Penn Central, Ann Arbor Railroad, Erie Lackawanna Railway, Lehigh Valley Railroad, Reading Company, Central Railroad of New Jersey and Lehigh and Hudson River Railway.
- Nearly 2,000 students became involved in a racially charged riot at Escambia High School in Pensacola, Florida; 30 students were injured in the 4-hour fray, including four who were hit by gunfire. The fighting began after a peaceful protest over whether the formerly all-white school's athletic teams should be called the "Raiders", or revert to their previous name of "Rebels".
- The UK's Hinkley Point B nuclear power station in Bridgwater, Somerset, UK, began operation as the first commercial Advanced Gas-cooled Reactor (AGR), generating electricity for the Central Electricity Generating Board (CEGB). The Windscale AGRs had begun operation in 1962 for the British government.

== February 6, 1976 (Friday) ==
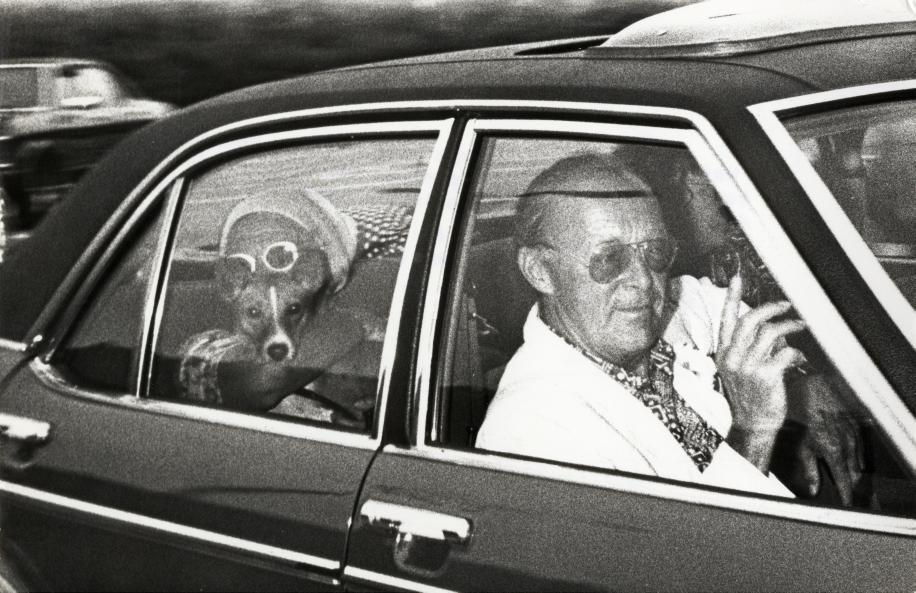
Prince Bernhard

- Prince Bernhard of the Netherlands, the husband of Queen Juliana and the inspector general of the Netherlands Armed Forces, was implicated in a bribery scandal in testimony by an official of the Lockheed Corporation, an American manufacturer of military and civilian aircraft. A. C. Kotchian, the corporation's president, testified that Lockheed paid $1.1 million to "a high official of the Netherlands", soon revealed to be Prince Bernhard, as well as two million to government officials in Japan in an effort to obtain contracts for the sale of its warplanes.
- In the same hearing, the vice chairman of Lockheed testified that the company paid $1,800,000 in bribes in 1972 to then Japanese Prime Minister Kakuei Tanaka, leading to Tanaka's arrest on July 27.
- Victor Garland resigned from Australian prime minister Malcolm Fraser's government, after being accused of electoral offences. He was replaced as Minister for Post and Telecommunications by Eric Robinson.
- Rhodesian prime minister Ian Smith declared that "a new terrorist offensive has begun and that, to defeat it, Rhodesians would have to face heavier military commitments." Security force reports indicated that around 1,000 insurgent fighters were active within Rhodesia, with a further 15,000 encamped in various states of readiness in Mozambique.
- Leonard Peltier, American Indian activist and one of the FBI's Ten Most Wanted criminals, was arrested in Canada after being located hiding in a cabin in Hinton, Alberta. He was charged with having killed two FBI agents on June 26, 1975, on the Pine Ridge Indian Reservation
- Born: Kim Zmeskal, American gymnast, 1991 all-around women's champion; in Houston
- Died:
  - Vince Guaraldi, 47, American jazz pianist known for composing much of the music on the Peanuts television specials, including the "Linus and Lucy" instrumental, died from a massive heart attack.
  - Black Jack, 19, American quarter horse for the U.S. Army's 3rd Infantry Caisson Platoon as the "riderless horse" in over 1,000 military funerals, including that of U.S. President John F. Kennedy

== February 7, 1976 (Saturday) ==
- Hua Guofeng, the Minister of Public Security and a relatively obscure Deputy Premier in China, was appointed by the Chinese Communist Party as the Acting Prime Minister of the People's Republic of China, to fill the vacancy left by the death of Zhou Enlai on January 6. Western observers had expected that the senior Deputy Premier, Deng Xiaoping, would be appointed to the position. At the same time that he was passed over by Chairman Mao Zedong to become the new Premier, Deng became the subject of a campaign against him in the form of 45 big-character posters, reminiscent of the Cultural Revolution in which Deng had once been disgraced, posted on walls at Beijing University. The accusations against him include that he was an "old capitalist roader who formed cliques around himself." It would later develop that the hate campaign against Deng was the idea of Chairman Mao's wife, Jiang Qing, in conjunction with three other leaders later tried in court as the "Gang of Four".
- Portugal changed the status of its overseas province of Macau, three islands located in the South China Sea off of the coast of the Guangdong Province of China, as "Chinese territory under Portuguese administration", providing limited autonomy with eventual transfer to the Chinese control. On December 20, 1999, Macau would become a special administrative region (SAR) of the People's Republic of China.
- In the U.S., a Baltimore & Ohio freight train struck a camper truck at an unprotected railroad crossing in Beckemeyer, Illinois, at about 6:50 in the evening. Eleven children and the driver were killed. Three others survived.
- Darryl Sittler of the Toronto Maple Leafs set a National Hockey League record that would still be unbroken 50 years later, scoring six goals and having four assists in an 11 to 4 win over the Boston Bruins, for a total of 10 points credited to him. In addition to setting the record for points in a game, Sittler also became the last player in the 20th century (and as of the 2025–26 season) to score six goals.
- Unbeknownst to people on Earth, the asteroid 3752 Camillo came within 0.0780 AU (11,670,000 km; 7,250,000 mi) of Earth. Camillo would not be discovered by an astronomer until August 15, 1985.
- Died: Cornelia Vanderbilt Goodsir, 75, American heiress and socialite who had received fifty million dollars on her 25th birthday as well as ownership of the largest privately owned mansion in the U.S., the Biltmore Estate

== February 8, 1976 (Sunday) ==
- A referendum on whether to join the Comoros, or remain a French overseas territory, was held on the island of Mayotte. The proposal was rejected by 99.42% of the 18,061 voters.
- The Angola national football team, the newly independent African nation's first venture into international soccer football, played its first game. Angola lost, 3 to 2, to the Republic of Congo. In 2006, Angola would become one of the 32 teams to qualify for the World Cup.

== February 9, 1976 (Monday) ==
- The world's largest cyclotron, Canada's TRIUMF (Tri-University Meson Facility) particle accelerator, was inaugurated at the University of British Columbia physics department building in Vancouver by Prime Minister Pierre Trudeau. Speaking to about 700 people "sitting on and around the giant cyclotron", Trudeau said "I'm not sure I could understand it if you spent some time explaining it to me, but I am excited that Canada has one of these things."
- Aeroflot Flight 3739, a Tupolev Tu-104A (registration СССР-42327), banked hard to the right on takeoff from Irkutsk Airport in Irkutsk in the Soviet Union's Russian Soviet Federated Socialist Republic and crashed, killing 24 of the 115 people on board.
- The Australian Defence Force was formed by unification of the Australian Army, the Royal Australian Navy and the Royal Australian Air Force.
- Charles, Prince of Wales, a lieutenant in Britain's Royal Navy, assumed command of a ship for the last 10 months of his naval career. The Prince was placed in charge of the coastal minehunter HMS Bronington and its 39-member crew. Although other members of British royalty had served as Royal Navy officers in the past, and Alfred the Great had captained vessels in battle, Charles became the first heir to the throne in modern times to be assigned to the command of a warship; he was officially titled "Lieutenant, the Prince of Wales" when he boarded HMS Bronington at Rosyth in Scotland. The wood-hulled Bronington itself has "a reputation for rolling on even the mildest of waves" and "a peculiar habit of slipping sideways in high winds, making it difficult to control in tight maneuvers".
- Rupert Hamer, Premier of the Australian state of Victoria, announced a March 20 election date, saying that it was the most convenient date because of the Premiers’ Conferences due to be held in Canberra in late April and June.
- In Spain, the People's Alliance electoral coalition was founded by Manuel Fraga and other former Francoist ministers.
- Born: Charlie Day, American actor, writer, producer and comedian, in New York City
- Died: Percy Faith, 67, Canadian orchestra and bandleader, composer and conductor

== February 10, 1976 (Tuesday) ==
- Ronald Webster was appointed Chief Minister of Anguilla. On February 7, 1969, Webster had led a rebellion against British colonial authorities and declared the island independent as the Republic of Anguilla with himself as president, before being forced to flee 40 days later when British troops carried out "Operation Sheepskin" and retook the island peacefully.
- Forty-five British citizens, who had signed contracts with a recruiting agency to fight in the Angolan Civil War, flew home after two weeks of fighting as hired mercenary soldiers. The men reported that they had agreed to risk their lives for six months in the southwest African nation, at a pay of $300 per week.
- Born:
  - Lance Berkman, American baseball player who was the 2002 RBI leader and the 2011 Comeback Player of the Year in the National League; in Waco, Texas
  - Vanessa da Mata, Brazilian MPB pop music singer and songwriter; in Alto Garças, Mato Grosso state

== February 11, 1976 (Wednesday) ==
- The "Democratic People's Republic of Angola", ruled jointly by FNLA leader Holden Roberto and UNITA leader Jonas Savimbi as "co-presidents", was dissolved after the Angolan Army, consisting of former MPLA guerrillas, captured the Republic's capital at Huambo.
- The first of the Soviet Union's Delta III-class submarine vessels, K-424, in launched from Severodvinsk. The ballistic missile submarine was designed to carry 16 R-29 Vysota nuclear missiles.
- Died:
  - Lee J. Cobb, 64, American stage and film actor known for portraying Willy Loman in the Broadway play Death of a Salesman
  - Alexander Lippisch, 81, German aerodynamicist who designed the first Messerschmitt and Dornier warplanes, including the first operating rocket-powered fighter plane, the Messerschmitt ME 163 B.
  - Dorothy Maud Wrinch, 81, American mathematician and biochemical theorist
  - Joseph Barboza Baron, 43, American mobster, hitman and FBI informant who had taken on the new name of "Joseph Donati" as part of the witness protection program, after being shot to death in San Francisco while walking to his car. Attorney F. Lee Bailey, who said that Baron claimed to have killed 26 people, commented, "With all due respect to my former client, I don't think society has suffered a great loss."

== February 12, 1976 (Thursday) ==
- The World Journal (Shìjiè Rìbào 北美世界日報|世界日報), the highest circulation Chinese language daily newspaper in the United States, published its first issue, initially for the New York City area.
- Died:
  - Sal Mineo, 37, U.S. film actor, was stabbed to death by a mugger after parking his car outside of his apartment in West Hollywood, California. Mineo was the second of the three stars of the classic 1955 film Rebel Without a Cause to die violently, more than 20 years after James Dean was killed in an auto accident, and five years before Natalie Wood's death by drowning. Lionel Ray Williams, a pizza deliveryman with a long criminal record, was later arrested and convicted of Mineo's murder, and sentenced to 51 years in prison.
  - Frank Stagg, 34, Irish Republican Army member imprisoned for conspiracy to commit criminal damage, died after a 62-day hunger strike that had started on December 13.

== February 13, 1976 (Friday) ==
- Brigadier General Murtala Rufai Mohammed, the head of state of Nigeria, was assassinated in a military coup d'état. According to witnesses, Murtala, who overthrew the government of President Yakubu Gowon the previous July, was being driven to military headquarters from his residence at the Dodan Barracks at the Ikoyi suburb of Lagos, and was cut off in traffic by his assassins, who fired automatic weapons at his car. Minutes later, a man who identified himself as Lieutenant Colonel S. S. Dimka seized the Radio Lagos station and announced that "The government has been overthrown by the young revolutionaries. Any attempt to foil this change from any quarter will be met with death. It is all over the 19 states." After six hours, the Nigerian Army retook the station and announced that the coup had been crushed.
- The two top officials of the Lockheed Corporation, chairman of the board and CEO Daniel J. Houghton, and chief operating officer A. Carl Kotchman, announced their resignations.
- The African Parliamentary Union (APU) was established by an agreement signed in Abidjan, capital of the Ivory Coast, as a means of communication between parliaments and legislatures of the various member nations in Africa, as well as to promote democracy and vote upon common goals on the continent. Originally called the Union of African Parliaments, the APU has 40 member nations more than forty years after its founding.
- Born:
  - Feist (stage name for Leslie Feist), Canadian singer-songwriter known for the double platinum selling album The Reminder and winner of multiple Juno awards; in Amherst, Nova Scotia
  - Jack Wong (Huang Zhang), Chinese electronics entrepreneur and billionaire who founded the smartphone manufacturer Meizu; in Meizhou City, Guangdong Province, People's Republic of China
- Died: Lily Pons, 74, American soprano with New York's Metropolitan Opera

== February 14, 1976 (Saturday) ==
- In the Second Battle of Amgala, Polisario Front fighters, funded by Algeria and seeking the independence of the Sahrawi Arab Democratic Republic defeat troops of Morocco and recapture the desert town. A month earlier, Moroccan troops had defeated an Algerian Army battalion.

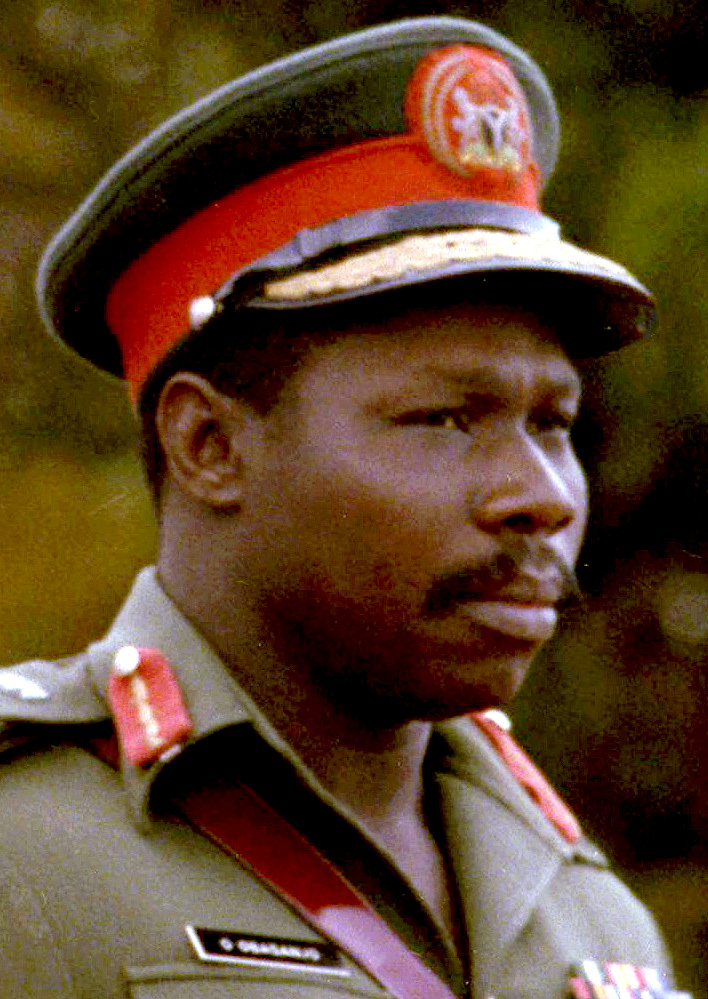
Obasanjo

- Lieutenant General Olusegun Obasanjo took office as the new Head of State of Nigeria as the government confirmed that General Murtala Muhammed was assassinated the day before.
- The Fondation Vasarely museum was established in Aix-en-Provence, France.
- Born: Kiku Sharda, Indian comedian and TV actor; in Jodhpur, Rajasthan state
- Died: George Bacon, 29, American CIA agent and former U.S. Army Green Beret, was killed while fighting as a mercenary in the Angolan Civil War

== February 15, 1976 (Sunday) ==
- The new Constitution of Cuba was adopted by an overwhelming (almost 98 percent in favor) vote in a national referendum.
- Six Japanese whaling companies (Nihon Suisan, Taiyo Gyogyo, Kyokuyo, Nitto Hogei, Nihon Hogei and Hokuyo Hogei) merged into a single corporation, Nihon Hyodo Hogei Company. Nihon Hyodo Hogei later changed its name to Kyodo Senpaku Company.
- The 1976 Winter Olympics closed at Innsbruck.
- A 12-year-old boy in Ferndale, Michigan became the first victim of the Oakland County Child Killer when he was kidnapped while walking home from an event at the local American Legion Hall. The body of Mark Stebbins was found four days later in a parking lot in Southfield. Over the next 13 months, three other children, aged 10, 11 and 12, were kidnapped and murdered at various locations in Oakland County, Michigan near Detroit.
- Bette Midler bailed seven members of her entourage out of jail after they were arrested on charges of possession of cocaine and marijuana at a motel in Buffalo, New York. The seven were released in time for her evening concert.

== February 16, 1976 (Monday) ==
- Meeting in Barcelona in Spain, representatives of 16 nations (in southern Europe, the Middle East and North Africa) that border the Mediterranean Sea finished a two-week conference on stopping pollution in the waters shared by all of them, with 12 signing the Barcelona Convention, officially the Convention for Protection of the Mediterranean Sea against Pollution.
- Malaysian armed robber Botak Chin was arrested at a sawmill after having been the Asian nation's most wanted fugitive. Despite six wounds sustained in a gun battle with Malaysian police, Chin survived. Despite being suspected of multiple murders, he was convicted of illegal possession of firearms, a capital offense in Malaysia, and would be hanged on June 11, 1981.
- The worst motor vehicle accident in Sweden occurred outside Axamo, Jönköping, when overheated tires caused a bus fire, killing 15 people and injuring 28.
- The unmanned Soviet spacecraft Soyuz 20 completed its 90-day mission to the Salyut 4 space station, with its biological payload of various organisms returning intact after three months in weightlessness. The ship had been launched on November 17, 1975, and was controlled entirely from the Baikonur ground control.
- American journalist and editor Liz Smith began publishing a gossip column for New York City's most popular daily newspaper, the Daily News tabloid. The column was soon syndicated to newspapers across North America and Smith would later become, for a while, the highest-paid print journalist in the U.S., with reports in newspapers and on television.
- Died: Lyudmila Keldysh, 71, Soviet Russian mathematician and specialist in geometric topology and set theory

== February 17, 1976 (Tuesday) ==
- The American Bar Association (ABA) voted for the first time to amend its rules of ethics to allow lawyers to advertise their services. Initially, the ABA approved letting attorneys buy display ads in telephone directories (specifically, the "Yellow Pages" for business phone numbers), with limitations on what could be allowed in the ad.
- Abuna Theophilos, Patriarch of the Ethiopian Orthodox Church, was removed from office by Ethiopia's military rulers, who had deposed the Emperor Haile Selassie in 1974. The Patriarch was arrested at his residence and imprisoned in the National Palace in Addis Ababa, formerly the Ethiopian imperial palace.
- The inspiration for creation of the advanced trauma life support (ATLS) program came after surgeon James K. Styner, his wife and his four children were injured in the crash of Dr. Styner's private airplane in Thayer County, Nebraska near Hebron. The tragedy, in which his wife was killed and the children received treatment from a team with no experience in serious trauma, led to Styner working with other surgeons to create ATLS in 1978.
- The BBC television series One Man and His Dog was broadcast for the first time in the UK. After being cancelled in 1999, it would return as an occasional series.
- The Clark National Forest and the Mark Twain National Forest, both created by the U.S. Forest Service in the state of Missouri on September 11, 1939, as a set of nine non-contiguous areas, were merged into a single group encompassing 1,491,840 acres or 2,331 square miles (6,040 km^{2}) under the name Mark Twain National Forest.
- Born:
  - Taim Hasan, Syrian television and film actor; in Tartus
  - Denis Maidanov, Russian singer-songwriter; in Balakovo, Russian SFSR, Soviet Union
- Died: Jean Servais, 65, Belgian-born French film actor and comedian

== February 18, 1976 (Wednesday) ==
- A general election was held in Antigua and Barbuda. Although the Progressive Labour Movement of Prime Minister George Walter, with a platform calling for immediate independence from the United Kingdom, received the most votes, but the opposition Antigua Labour Party won more than double the number of seats. ALP leader Vere Bird became Premier of Antigua.

== February 19, 1976 (Thursday) ==
- Iceland severed diplomatic relations with the United Kingdom as a result of the dispute over British fishing within 200 miles (320 km) of Iceland, marking the first time in the history of the North Atlantic Treaty Organization of a formal breach between two members of the alliance.
- Marisat 1, the first maritime communications satellite, was launched into orbit by the U.S. from Cape Canaveral in Florida at 5:32 in the afternoon. It was placed into its permanent geosynchronous orbit on February 21.
- U.S. President Gerald Ford signed a proclamation formally rescinding President Franklin D. Roosevelt's Executive Order 9066 of February 19, 1942, which had authorized the arrest and internment of U.S. citizens of Japanese ancestry during World War II. In issuing Presidential Proclamation 4417, President Ford apologized on behalf of the U.S. government and said "I call upon the American people to affirm with me... that we have learned from the tragedy of that long ago experience -- forever to treasure liberty and justice for each individual American and resolve that this kind of error shall never be made again."
- The Sanremo Music Festival 1976 opened at the Sanremo Casino, presented by Giancarlo Guardabassi.

== February 20, 1976 (Friday) ==
- The government of Argentina scheduled new presidential elections for December 12. The notice came one day after President Isabel Perón, who was completing the term of her husband, the late Juan Peron, announced that she would not run for another term of office.
- The Panamanian-registered coaster Marie Elizabeth (formerly the Clary) was destroyed by fire while moored at Barcelona.
- World heavyweight boxing champion Muhammad Ali, in his first bout since October's "Thrilla in Manila", defended his title before a relatively unknown boxer from Belgium, Jean-Pierre Coopman, who weighs 20 pounds (9.1 kg) less than Ali. Although the fight was judged almost even in the first four rounds, Coopman was knocked out with 14 seconds left in the fifth round.
- Born: Anastasia Volochkova, Russian ballerina, in Saint Petersburg
- Died:
  - René Cassin, 88, French judge, recipient of the Nobel Peace Prize
  - Kathryn Kuhlman, 70, American television evangelist and faith healer known for syndicated program I Believe in Miracles; while recovering from heart surgery

== February 21, 1976 (Saturday) ==
- Former U.S. President Richard M. Nixon arrived in Beijing after being invited for a visit to a meeting with government leaders of the People's Republic of China. On his arrival, the ex-president and his wife, Pat Nixon, were greeted by Acting Prime Minister Hua Guofeng and Foreign Minister Huang Hua, exactly four years after then President Nixon's historic first visit to China.
- The first Winter Paralympics, officially the "Winter Olympic Games for the Disabled", opened at a ski resort in Örnsköldsvik in Sweden. Sixteen nations took part with 196 athletes who had various disabilities, including blindness or amputation of limbs. The events were limited to two categories of skiing, Alpine and Cross-country.
- Twelve senior detectives working for the London Metropolitan police (colloquially referred to as Scotland Yard) were arrested in a raid on their London homes after being indicted on charges of accepting bribes from pornography distributors in Westminster's Soho district between 1960 and 1974.

== February 22, 1976 (Sunday) ==
- Joe Clark was elected leader of the Progressive Conservative Party of Canada, replacing Robert Stanfield. Clark, "a little-known, 36-year old Member of Parliament from Alberta" defeated the other candidate, MP Claude Wagner in an 1,187 to 1,122 vote by the delegates on the third ballot.
- The Communist government of Vietnam turned over the remains of Charles McMahon and Darwin Judge, the last two U.S. servicemen to have been killed in the Vietnam War, allowing a group from the office of the United Nations High Commissioner for Refugees to land a chartered Air France jet at the Tan Son Nhut Air Base at Ho Chi Minh City (formerly Saigon). Private McMahon and Lance Corporal Judge, both of the United States Marines, had been killed by a rocket attack on the base on April 29, 1975, while helping passengers board the final evacuation flights prior to the city's surrender to the Viet Cong and the North Vietnamese Army.
- Israel turned over to Egypt the remaining section of the Sinai Peninsula that had been agreed upon in the Sinai Interim Agreement signed between the two nations on September 4. The last portion from which Israeli troops withdrew was 89 square miles (230 km^{2}) on a line parallel to, and 10 miles east of, the Suez Canal.
- Portugal, which granted independence to Angola in 1975, joined with other Western nations in giving diplomatic recognition to the Popular Movement for the Liberation of Angola (MPLA) as the southwestern African nation's government, under the official name of the People's Republic of Angola. Rejected were claims to recognition made by the rival National Union for the Total Independence of Angola (UNITA, led by Jonas Savimbi) and by the National Liberation Front of Angola (FNLA, led by Holden Roberto) to create the Democratic People's Republic of Angola.
- In a challenge to prohibitions against lawyer advertising that would eventually lead to the landmark 1978 U.S. Supreme Court decision of Bates v. State Bar of Arizona, attorneys John Bates and Van O'Steen of Phoenix, Arizona, published a display ad in the Sunday edition of The Arizona Republic to provide information of their prices for various legal services. As expected by Bates and O'Steen, the state bar association initiated disciplinary proceedings against the two attorneys. The association recommended their suspension from the practice of law for six months; the U.S. Supreme Court agreed later in the year to review the Arizona Supreme Court decision.
- The Indian cricket team completed its tour of New Zealand, losing at Basin Reserve, Wellington, to draw the series 1-1.
- Died: Florence Ballard, 32, U.S. singer, a founding member of The Supremes, died from a coronary thrombosis.

== February 23, 1976 (Monday) ==
- In her trial for bank robbery, kidnap victim turned terrorist Patty Hearst followed the advice of her attorney, F. Lee Bailey, and invoked the Fifth Amendment right against self-incrimination, refusing 42 times to answer questions posed by the prosecution while a jury watches.
- CBS Evening News investigative reporter Daniel Schorr was taken off of the air and relieved of all duties by the network after being implicated in the leak, to the newspaper The Village Voice, of a confidential report of a U.S. House of Representatives subcommittee investigating illegal activities of the U.S. Central Intelligence Agency. Schorr had most recently appeared on the air on February 18. The award-winning TV journalist was allowed to retain an office at the CBS Washington bureau and to stay on the payroll, but resigned in September after refusing to reveal his source for the leaked report.
- Died: L. S. Lowry, 88, British artist

== February 24, 1976 (Tuesday) ==
- The 25th Congress of the Communist Party of the Soviet Union (CPSU) opened in Moscow in order for policies and plans for the Soviet Union to be endorsed, along with the approval of changes in the membership of the CPSU's Central Committee and Politburo. The Congress, the first since 1971, was attended by 4,998 delegates selected by local Communist Party chapters from the 15 constituent republics of the U.S.S.R. It would last for 11 full days, closing on March 6.
- In the first primary election in the 1976 United States presidential election, former Georgia Governor Jimmy Carter won the New Hampshire Democratic primary, considered at the time as the primary election that would determine the front runner and eventual nominee for president. Carter, who won the plurality (30%) of the votes cast, received 15 of the state's 17 convention delegates and the runner-up, U.S. Congressman Morris "Mo" Udall of Arizona (24%), won the other two.
- In the Republican primary, incumbent U.S. President Gerald Ford narrowly defeated former California Governor Ronald Reagan by a margin of 1,587 votes (55,156 to 53,569) and received 18 of the 21 delegates.
- Cuba's new constitution took effect.

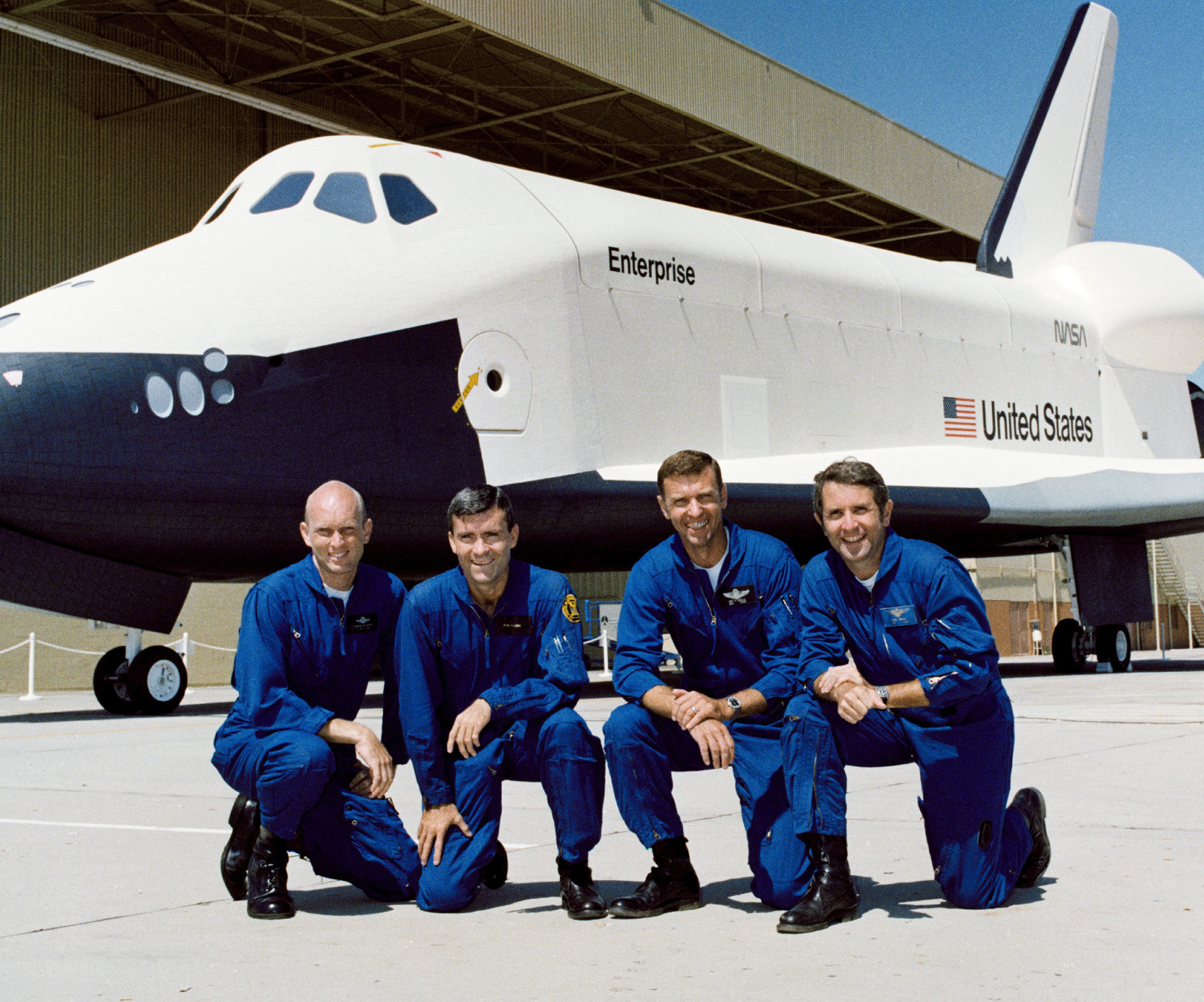
Fullerton, Haise, Engle and Truly

- NASA announced missions for the first four astronauts for the Approach and Landing Tests of the space shuttle Enterprise, with Apollo 13 veteran Fred Haise as commander and C. Gordon Fullerton as pilot for the first test. The crew for the second series of practice landings was designated as Richard H. Truly and pilot Joe Engle, who would later be assigned to the second space shuttle mission, STS-2
- A week after its release, the Eagles' Their Greatest Hits (1971–1975) compilation became the first album in history to be certified platinum by the RIAA. The new platinum certification represented sales of at least 1 million copies for albums and 2 million copies for singles.
- The body of Anna Mae Aquash, a Canadian-born Mi'kmaq activist for the American Indian Movement was located in South Dakota beside a highway passing through the Pine Ridge Indian Reservation, two months after she had last been seen in public.

== February 25, 1976 (Wednesday) ==
- A vote on whether to impeach Argentina's president, Isabel Perón, failed in the Argentine Chamber of Deputies, 70 to 120, after the Popular Federalist Party had proposed the resolution in a special session.
- On the same day, one of many activists opposed to President Peron, Héctor Aldo Fagetti Gallego, was arrested in Buenos Aires, and never seen again after March 10, becoming one of the first of the many of thousands of Desaparecidos who would vanish after an extension of the government's aniquilar la subversion (annihilate the subversion) order of October 6, 1975; Peron would be arrested in Spain 40 years later for the murder of Fagetti and another dissident, Jorge Valentin Beron but charges would be dismissed as having been filed too late
- Comet West, discovered by astronomer Richard M. West on August 10, 1975, made its closest approach to the Sun, and was observable in broad daylight with an apparent magnitude of -3.00, similar to the maximum brightness of Mars in the night sky. On March 7, 1976, the nucleus of Comet West was observed to split into two fragments.
- The song "Save Your Kisses for Me", performed by Brotherhood of Man, was selected as the UK entry in the Eurovision Song Contest 1976; it went on to win the contest.

== February 26, 1976 (Thursday) ==
- Leaders of Portugal's armed forces and of that nation's five main political parties signed an agreement in Belém to end military rule and to establish a democratic, multi-party system. General Francisco da Costa Gomes, Portugal's president, signed on behalf of the Army and Mário Soares signed as leader of the Partido Socialista. Costa Gomes confirmed that parliamentary elections would be held on April 25.
- The Spanish Armed Forces announced their withdrawal from Western Sahara. On November 6, Spain, Morocco and Mauritania had agreed to jointly administer the former Spanish Sahara until February 28, and Spain decided to relinquish control two days ahead of schedule.

== February 27, 1976 (Friday) ==
Area under the control of the Sahara republic (in green)

- The Polisario Front, Western Sahara's national liberation movement, declared independence of the territory as the "Sahara Arab Democratic Republic", and began a guerrilla war against Morocco and Mauritania. At the same time, an assembly of 65 of the 102 tribal chiefs in the Western Sahara voted to approve plans by Morocco and Mauritania to annex the former Spanish territory and to provide some autonomy for the inhabitants.

Nunavut Territory (in red)

- Creation of what would eventually become the Canadian territory of Nunavut was first proposed, as leaders of the 15,000-member Inuit of Canada (colloquially referred to at the time as "Eskimos") made a presentation to Prime Minister Pierre Trudeau and his Cabinet. Written by James Arvaluk, president of the Inuit Taprisat, the 61-page proposal called upon immediate recognition of 250,000 square miles (650,000 km^{2}) of the Northwest Territories (N.W.T.) as Nunavut, the property of the Canadian Inuit, and for the granting of special rights in an additional 500,000 square miles (1,300,000 km^{2}) of land in the N.W.T. and 800,000 square miles (2,100,000 km^{2}) of the Arctic Ocean. The Nunavut Land Claims Agreement would be signed on May 25, 1993, and Nunavut would become a separate territory on April 1, 1999.
- U.S. businessman William F. Niehous, the general manager of the Owens-Illinois Venezuela glass manufacturing factory in the South American nation, was kidnapped from his home near Caracas by masked guerrillas of the Argimiro Gabaldon Revolutionary Command. He would be held captive for more than three years, before being rescued by police in the city of Ciudad Bolivar on June 30, 1979.
- Born: Manoj Muntashir, Indian Hindi songwriter and translator; as Manoj Shukla in Gauriganj, Uttar Pradesh
- Died: Sir Edward Asafu-Adjaye, 72, Ghanaian diplomat who served as the African nation's first ambassador to the United Kingdom and to France.

== February 28, 1976 (Saturday) ==
- The first major "sting operation" resulted in the arrest of 60 criminal suspects who had been invited to a "thank you party" hosted by FBI officials who had been posing as mobsters, bringing a close to a five-month-long investigation into the sale of stolen property. Code named "Operation Sting", the operation had started from an investigation of the theft of typewriters, and had involved 20,000 purchased at a rented warehouse of stolen property. In all, 225 individuals sold property to detectives who had used pseudonyms like "Angelo Lasagna" and "Pasquale Larocca" while tape recording conversations, then invited them to a formal party as a show of gratitude.

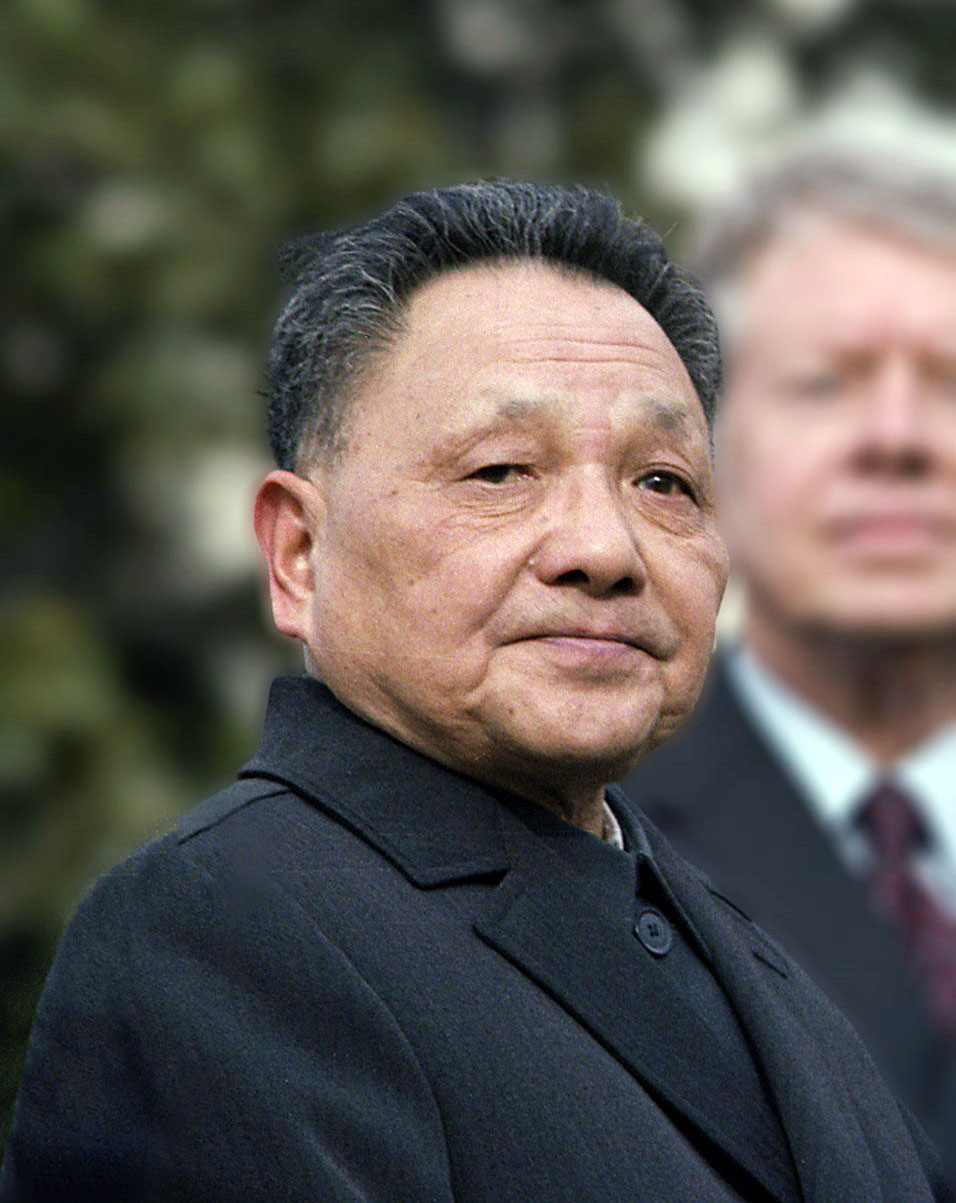
Deng

- For the first time since the campaign against China's Vice Premier Deng Xiaoping began, the ruling Chinese Communist Party joined the condemnation with an editorial in its official newspaper, the People's Daily, although indirectly, referring to "that unrepentant capitalist roader in the Party" as one of the targets for party leaders to address in order to "bring into full play the Party organization's role as a fighting bastion in the great struggle to criticize the revisionist program." The move came two days after the "big-character posters" on the walls of Beijing University began mentioning Deng by name. The slogans included "Deng Xiaoping was Evil Minded" and "Deng Xiaoping was Crafty as a Fox".
- Before a crowd of 100,000 at England's Wembley Stadium, Manchester City won, 2 to 1, over Newcastle United to capture the Football League Cup in the final game of the 92-team knockout competition for English professional soccer football. At the end of regular season play, City had finished in 8th place
- Madagascar became the first country to recognise the Sahrawi Arab Democratic Republic.
- Died: Boonsanong Punyodyana, Thai politician and Secretary General of the Socialist Party of Thailand, was shot and killed outside a hotel in Bangkok.

== February 29, 1976 (Sunday) ==
- The 1965 hit film The Sound of Music, at one time the highest-grossing movie in history by amount of ticket sales, was broadcast on television in the United States for the first time, after the ABC television network paid a record $15,000,000 to show it a single time.
- Catherine Ferry was selected to represent France in the Eurovision Song Contest 1976, with the song "Un, deux, trois".
- Died:
  - Norman J. Rees (Nuncio Ruisi), 69, Italian-born American double agent who had spied for the Soviet KGB and for the U.S. FBI, killed himself after the Dallas Times-Herald published its investigative report exposing his activities. Rees had called the Times-Herald the day before, notifying them that he would commit suicide if the newspaper published the report.
  - Nadim al-Pachachi, 61, Iraqi-born Libyan economic adviser and Secretary-General of OPEC who proposed using the price of oil as a means of influencing world politics concerning Israel, was killed in a skiing accident while on vacation in Switzerland.
