= Duboin =

Duboin is a surname. Notable people with the surname include:

- Giorgio Duboin (born 1959), Italian bridge player
- Jacques Duboin (1878–1976), French economist
