= M24 =

M24, M.24 or M-24 may refer to:

== Military ==
- HMS M24, a Royal Navy M15 class monitor
- HMS M24, Royal Swedish Navy ship, (see List of mine warfare vessels of the Royal Swedish Navy)
- M24 Chaffee, an American light tank
- Miles M.24, a proposed Second World War British fighter aircraft
- Macchi M.24, an 1924 Italian flying boat, originally a bomber, later also employed in civilian use
- M24 mine, an American landmine
  - M24 series, a line of Mauser battle rifles used by the Yugoslavian military
  - FN Model 24, a Belgian version of design
- M24 Sniper Weapon System, a sniper rifle
- M24 trailer, a World War II US Army ammunition trailer
- M-24, a Japanese midget submarine that participated in the attack on Sydney Harbour in the World War II
- M-24 20mm aircraft cannon, American variant of the Hispano-Suiza HS.404

== Aviation ==
- Grigorovich M-24, a Soviet flying boat
- Magni M-24 Orion, an Italian autogyro
- Messerschmitt M 24, a German passenger aircraft
- MSrE M-24, a 1938 Hungarian sport aircraft
- PZL M-24 Dromader Super, a Polish agricultural aircraft

== Other ==
- M 24, a political movement in the People's Republic of Congo.
- The Mathieu group M24 in the mathematical field of group theory
- M-24 (Michigan highway), a state highway in Michigan
- Messier 24 (M24), a cloud of stars also referred to as the Small Sagittarius Star Cloud
- Olivetti M24, a computer
- M24 (Cape Town), a Metropolitan Route in Cape Town, South Africa
- M24 (Pretoria), a Metropolitan Route in Pretoria, South Africa
- M-24 Alpha, a fictional trinary star system in the original Star Trek episode "The Gamesters of Triskelion"
- M24 (rapper), British rapper
- McLaren M24, an Indycar chassis
