= Ángel Robledo =

Argentine politician

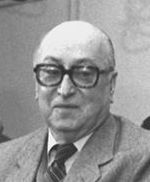
Ángel Federico Robledo

Ángel Federico Robledo (18 July 1917 – 14 November 2004) was an Argentine politician, who occupied several posts during the presidencies of Juan Perón, Héctor José Cámpora, and Isabel Perón, such as Minister of Defense, Minister of Foreign Relationships, and Minister of Interior. He also served as Argentine Ambassador to Ecuador, Mexico and Brazil in different periods.

He was born in Bustinza, Santa Fe province and studied law at National University of the Littoral.
