= Miriam Lewin =

Argentine journalist and writer

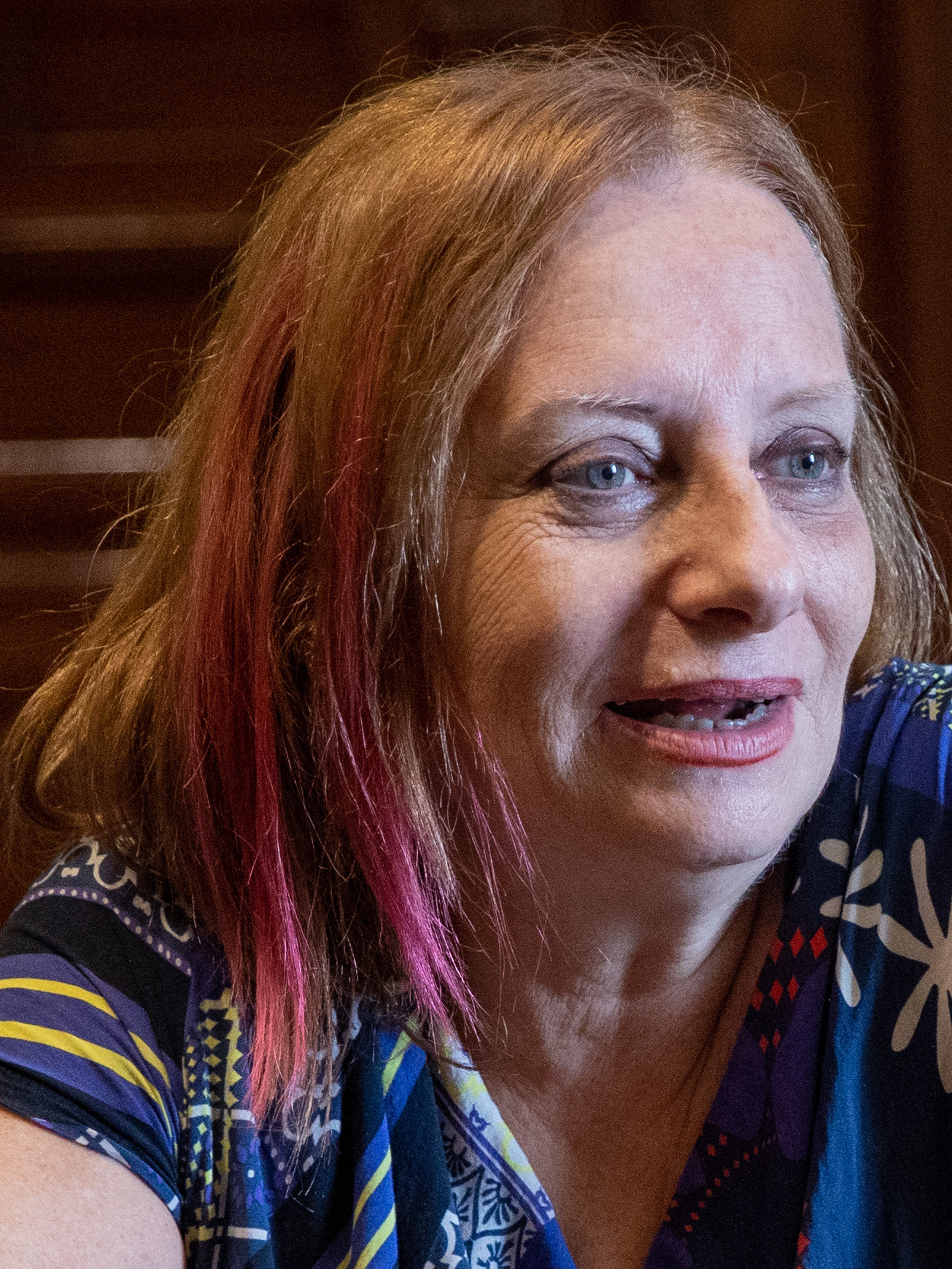
Lewin in 2022

Miriam Lewin (born 27 November 1957) is an Argentine journalist and writer. Lewin was a political activist during the National Reorganization Process and was kidnapped and disappeared by the junta. In 1985, she testified at the Trial of the Juntas.

== Early life ==
Lewin was born in 1957. She grew up in Buenos Aires and became politically active as a teenager.

Lewin studied at the Colegio Nacional de Buenos Aires from 1970 to 1974, obtaining her bachelor's degree there along with a certificate from a workshop in theater. She studied journalism in 1975 under Eduardo Suárez, a member of the Montoneros, at the Escuela de Periodismo del Instituto Grafotécnico, where the phrase "objective journalism is a fantasy" stuck out to her as relevant to the state of Argentina at the time.

== Disappearance ==
Lewin was abducted by the junta at age 19. She was held in a clandestine detention center. After a year, she was brought to the Navy Mechanical School, a torture site where over 5,000 people were held before their deaths.

== Post-incarceration ==
Lewin obtained a Master's degree in investigative journalism from the Universidad del Salvador in 2007.

In a 2018 interview, Lewin put forth concerns over the lack of journalism about use of agrochemicals in Argentina, the state of mining in the country, and the use of social media information by Argentine Intelligence Services.

A committee of the Argentine Bicameral de Promoción y Seguimiento Audiovisual, las Tecnologías de las Telecomunicaciones y la Digitalización appointed Lewin as Public Defender of Audiovisual Communication Services in May 2020. Several members of the committee abstained from voting, questioning the methodology by which Lewin was elected for the position. As Public Defender, Lewin promoted projects that encourage responsible journalism, including the anti-disinformation project Nodio.

Beginning in 2003, Lewin worked to track down the planes used for death flights by the junta.

== Writing career ==
Lewin is the author of several books. Her first publication, Ese infierno: Conversaciones de cinco mujeres sobrevivientes de la ESMA, was written in 2001, co-authored with Munu Actis, Elisa Tokar, Cristina Aldini and Liliana Gardella, four other survivors of ESMA. Five cases from her 2010 radio fiction show Secretos Argentinos were published in a book of the same name in 2011, which was co-authored with Marcelo Camaño. Alongside Olga Wornat, she wrote Putas y Guerrilleras in 2014, a work on the sexual abuse faced by those in concentration camps under the military dictatorship; it was republished in 2020 with a prologue by Rita Laura Segato.

Lewin's book with Horacio Lutzky Iosi, el espía arrepentido, published in 2015, follows a Federal Police intelligence agent over 15 years as he infiltrates the Jewish community. It was adapted into a television series for Amazon Prime Video as Yosi, the Regretful Spy in 2022.

== Bibliography ==
=== Books ===
- Ese infierno: Conversaciones de cinco mujeres sobrevivientes de la ESMA (2001) Editorial Sudamericana. Coauthored by Múnu Actis, Elisa Tokar, Cristina Aldini and Liliana Gardella. ISBN 978-950-07-2087-8
- Manuscrito de Dinamarca (2001) Ediciones Colihue. ISBN 978-950-581-225-7
- Secretos Argentinos: la intimidad de los crímenes que conmovieron al país (2011) Buenos Aires Aguilar; Altea; Taurus; Alfaguara. En colaboración con Marcelo Camaño. ISBN 978-987-04-2120-7
- Huellas teóricas en la práctica pedagógica: el dinamismo lingüístico en el aula intercultural (2013) Universidad Nacional de La Plata. With Barros Michelle, D´Agostino Mariana Andrea, Fernández Guillermo, García Novello Susana, Speranza Adriana, Toledo Claudia, and Martínez Angelita. ISBN 978-950-34-0997-8
- Putas y guerrilleras: Crímenes sexuales en los centros clandestinos de detención (2014) Editorial Planeta. Coauthored by Olga Wornat. ISBN 978-950-49-3934-4
- Iosi, el espía arrepentido (2015) Editorial Sudamericana. Coauthored by Horacio Lutzky. ISBN 978-950-07-5439-2
- Skyvan: aviones, pilotos y archivos secretos (2017) Editorial Sudamericana. ISBN 978-950-07-5947-2
- Silencios y violencias de género (2020) Universidad Nacional de General Sarmiento. In collaboration with Ana Longoni, Fabricio Andrés Laino Sanchís, Gerardo Yoel, Lizel Tornay, Lucía Rud, María Sonderéguer, Tununa Mercado, and Victoria Álvarez. ISBN 978-987-630-467-2
- Las comunicaciones públicas en tiempos de pandemia: nuevos saberes y desafíos profesionales (2022) Nueva Editorial Universitaria - U.N.S.L. Compilation with Martín Mónica, Longo Verónica, Viñals Soria Luz, Hidalgo, Ana Laura. ISBN 978-987-733-299-5
- (Re)Hacer los medios (2022) Universidad Nacional de La Plata. ISBN 978-987-8475-68-4
- Dina y Natan (2025) Editorial Sudamericana. Collabortation with Horacio Lutzky. ISBN 978-950-07-7126-9
