= Lorenzo Miguel =

Argentine labor leader

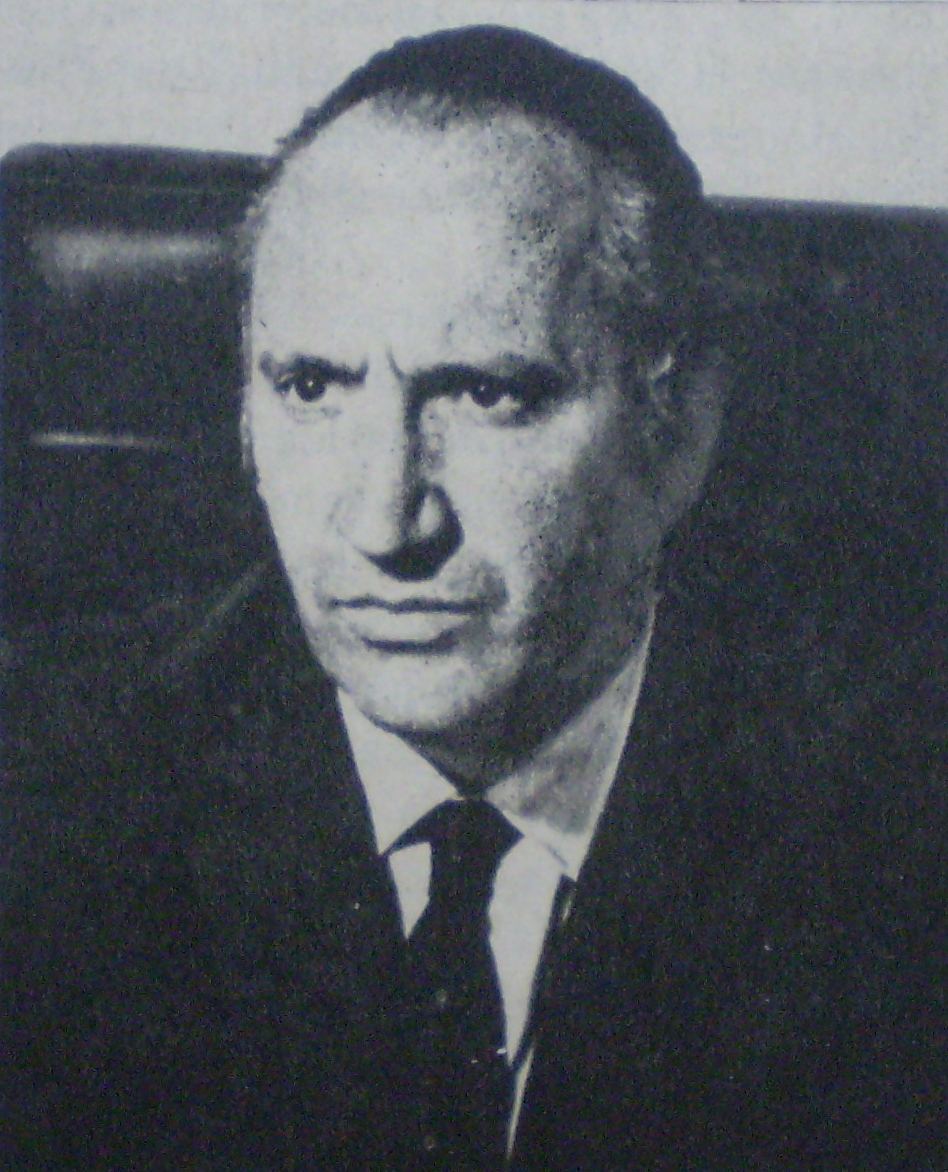
- Born: March 27, 1927; Villa Lugano, Buenos Aires
- Died: December 29, 2002 (aged 75); Buenos Aires
- Occupation: labor leader

Lorenzo Miguel (March 27, 1927 - December 29, 2002) was a prominent Argentine labor leader closely associated with the steelworkers' union.

== Life and times ==
=== Early life and his rise in the UOM ===
Lorenzo Marcelo Miguel was born and raised in the working-class borough of Villa Lugano in Buenos Aires. Entering the labor force in 1945 as a peon in his neighborhood's CAMEA steel mill, Miguel took up amateur boxing as a pastime, winning 13 of the 19 matches he fought in; a knockout defeat at Buenos Aires' famed Luna Park led him to abandon the pursuit, however. His election as shop steward by his coworkers at CAMEA in 1952 first brought him to the attention of the leadership at the Union of Metallurgy Workers (UOM), a growing body within the CGT and its 62 unions. Miguel married a CAMEA coworker, Elena Ramos, with whom he has two children, in 1958, though the violent 1955 overthrow of the populist President Juan Perón led to official harassment of many in the labor movement, including Miguel (who spent much of the 1959-62 period in jail). Following President Arturo Frondizi's restoration of the CGT's right to political activity, the UOM elected the conciliatory Augusto Vandor as their leader in early 1962 and with him, the frugal Lorenzo Miguel as treasurer.

President Frondizi was forced to resign following his overtures to the CGT and Peronists, leading the exiled Perón to oppose further dialogue with the Argentine government. This was opposed by Vandor, however, who began calling for a "Peronism without Perón" until a 1966 coup d'état that installed the anti-labor President Juan Carlos Onganía forced organized labor to rally around their exiled benefactor. Reconciled with Perón and the leader of a UOM with over 400,000 members (a fifth of the CGT), Vandor was Argentina's most powerful labor leader when he was assassinated in a brutal June 1969 assault on his bureau at the UOM, who, following an acrimonious power struggle, elected Miguel as Secretary General in March 1970. He leveraged this victory to advance a rival within the UOM, José Ignacio Rucci, as the new Secretary General of the CGT, then the largest labor union in South America. The pragmatic Miguel thus turned a rival into an ally, while impeding the more combative Light and Power workers' leader, Agustín Tosco, from rising to the powerful post.

=== The Peronist revival ===
This opposition to leftists within the labor movement intensified following Peronists' return to power in a March 1973 electoral landslide. Finding common cause with Perón's influential private assistant, José López Rega, Miguel helped him finance El Caudillo ("The Strongman"), a fascist periodical that served as the public relations arm of López Rega's newly organized death squad, the Triple A. Miguel's ties to the group were first exposed after June 20, 1973, when UOM heavies reportedly helped the Triple A ignite a riot at a massive gathering in honor of Perón's return to Argentina. The UOM's presumptive role, though minor, forced Miguel attend a summit with his archenemies, the violently leftist Montoneros, in which he denied complicity and arrived at a mutual understanding. This cordiality was shattered, however, by the September 25 assassination of CGT head José Ignacio Rucci, an act for which the Montoneros took credit and which turned Miguel into their implacable enemy. The UOM then took part in a February 1974 police coup that led to the violent exit of leftist Córdoba Province Governor Ricardo Obregón Cano, elected in 1973 as a Peronist (FREJULI) candidate, and Miguel helped persuade the aging Perón to promote a right-wing Admiral and personal friend, Emilio Massera, as Head of the Navy, as well as to break with leftist Peronists shortly before his July 1974 passing.

UOM's Buenos Aires headquarters then became a base of operations for the Triple A, one of whose operatives, Alejandro Giovenco, died when a bomb intended for the leftist Peronist Youth detonated in his possession, instead. The unwanted attention this brought on Miguel was compounded by the discovery of the murder of Hugo Dubchek - Miguel's bodyguard - reportedly during a large movement of arms through the building, in whose furnace his remains were found. The November 1974 election of leftist shop steward Alberto Piccinini at ACINDAR's important Villa Constitución steel mill prompted Miguel to help the company lobby President Isabel Perón (the leader's widow) for an armed intervention, which took place in a March 1975 police assault on the facility. The resulting arrests led to the "disappearances" of over 100 of some of the first victims of the later infamous Dirty War.

Miguel's allegiance with López Rega was strained when, in May, the mercurial death squad leader prevailed on Mrs. Perón to install a protégé as head of the critical Economy Ministry, Celestino Rodrigo. Rodrigo quickly unveiled an austerity package which, attempting to deal with the country's yawning trade gap, shocked markets with a sudden halving of the peso's value, which paralyzed new construction and industrial spending and threw the CGT (particularly steelworkers) against the plan. This forced Miguel to lead the reluctant CGT leadership into a general strike in July, the first ever against a Peronist administration. Mrs. Péron yielded by dismissing Rodrigo and López Rega, who was exiled to Spain; but the crisis led most public figures to call for her resignation, raising the possibility of a military coup d'état. Advising her to advance elections five months, Miguel became the leading voice among the few who still supported seeing the President complete her term in office. His call for loyalty, a stance he described as "verticalist", lost its little support following a new, sharp devaluation of the shredded peso in February 1976 and a violent March 24 coup resulted in Miguel's arrest, along with the President and thousands of others.

=== Persecution, return and twilight ===
Miguel counted on his former alliance with Acindar CEO José Alfredo Martínez de Hoz (appointed Minister of the Economy by the new regime) and on his friendship with Admiral Massera who, as Head of the Navy became the second-highest ranking public official in Argentina. These connections protected him from torture; but Miguel's accounts were frozen and he remained in prison for three years and spent another year in house arrest, leading him to sever his ties to the disloyal Massera. Emerging from his reclusion in 1980, and participated in the reconstitution of 25 of the more active unions into the CGT-Brasil (named after their Brasil Street address), supporting the replacement of Raúl Baldassini with the more confrontational Saúl Ubaldini. Miguel also retook the reins of an UOM hobbled by the massive industrial layoffs brought about by Martínez de Hoz's policies.

These developments turned him into a vocal opponent of the dictatorship. Following the worst economic crisis since the great depression and the tragic invasion of the Falklands, the dictatorship called for elections in 1983. Facing a divided Justicialist Party (Peronists), Miguel's support of former Senate leader Ítalo Lúder (an ally during his mid 1970s attacks on the left) was instrumental to the party's securing a nominee, albeit two months late. The rival centrist UCR pointed to this move as evidence that Lúder was supported by the violent right and was, by extension, likely to grant the anxious outgoing military leadership blanket pardons for their "Dirty War." The argument resonated among voters, giving UCR nominee Raúl Alfonsín an ample victory (the UCR's first against a Peronist candidate).

Following promises to the contrary, Alfonsín turned to increasingly conservative policies in the face of an inherited financial crisis and massive inflation (the world's highest, at the time). Miguel, who led a decimated UOM with a membership (150,000) less than half of its 1970s level, became increasingly marginal to the national discourse; by 1990, he was relegated to helping mediate conflicts between Ubaldini and Alfonsín's successor, President Carlos Menem. Menem, a lifelong Peronist who had been nominated partly with Miguel's last-minute support, quickly took to privatizing Argentina's array of State enterprises, a surprise move opposed by the CGT for the many layoffs it caused. The now compliant Miguel was compelled to call off a strike even after Menem's 1991 sell-off of SOMISA, then Argentina's largest steelmaker, and to support Menem's 1995 reelection bid. Following a decade of Argentina's first (and only) anti-labor Peronist administration, an ally of Miguel's, Buenos Aires Province Governor Eduardo Duhalde was soundly defeated in the 1999 presidential election.

Suffering from a worsening kidney ailment, Miguel considered giving his support to San Luis Governor Adolfo Rodríguez Saá's (unsuccessful) candidacy for president; but he died in a Buenos Aires clinic at the end of 2002. Miguel was 75.
