= Héctor Aldo Fagetti Gallego =

Argentine activist

Héctor Aldo Fagetti Gallego was an Argentine activist who disappeared in 1975 during the presidency of Isabel Perón, who was President of Argentina from July 1, 1974, to March 24, 1976. In January 2007 an Argentine federal judge, Raúl Costa, ordered the arrest of former President Isabel Perón over Gallego's disappearance. Isabel Perón was placed under house arrest in Spain and shortly after it was determined by Spanish courts that she would not be extradited to Argentina to stand trial.

== General references ==
- BBC: "An Argentine judge has ordered the arrest of former President Isabel Peron over the disappearance of a leftist activist in the 1970s."
- LA Times: "Isabel Peron's arrest signals shift in Argentina"
- The Guardian article on Isabel Perón's arrest
