= Jacques Duboin =

French economist

Jacques Duboin (17 September 1878 – 17 March 1976) was a French economist.

== Biography ==
He was born in Saint-Julien-en-Genevois on 17 September 1878 and died at Versailles on 17 March 1976. He was a banker, industrialist and politician.

His ideas included:

- a distributive currency, a money of consumption being in accordance to the economical activity and that doesn't allow any speculation;
- a minimal universal income
- a sharing of workload, linked to the signing of a "social contract";
- a local and participative democracy
- the "property of usage" or "usage property" (propriété d'usage in French)

== Distributive economy ==
Jacques Duboin invented the concept of distributive economy (fr: Économie distributive), an idea he defended in approximately thirty books and conferences, and also in his revue La Grande Relève. His daughter, Marie-Louise Duboin, who took over the revue, keeps on defending and developing his ideas. In 1984, she published Les Affranchis de l'an 2000, which present the society and how it would be if the distributive economy was applied all of that under the form of a novel. In 2007, she published Mais où va l'argen, the main object of which is the criticism of the monetary creation, and how it is done today, and which also introduces some distributive economy proposals.

From 2009 to 2011, seven series of Colibri Solidaire et Distributif have been published, which illustrated the distributive economy through experienced that are close to it.

== Distributive currency ==
The distributive currency is a currency of consumption, which means that it destroy through use (as a tube ticket for example), it matches with the economic activity and doesn't allow financial speculation. It's the Government (or State) that creates the distributive currency. It creates the amount of money matching the production, and distributes it in a democratic decided fashion amongst all. Each month, the governing body (State, Government etc.) count the goods and services made which are sold to the final consumer, it calculates its represented value and fabricates the money that matches.

This currency is destroyed gradually as the goods and services are bought. The monetary mass is always equivalent to the goods and services available. This way, in contrast to Stalinist countries where people had money but where the shops were often empty, in contrast to capitalist countries where the shops are full but where many people don't have enough money, in a "rich" Distributive Economy wise country, the shops would be full and people would have the corresponding money.

In regards to the purchases and sales between companies, two options are possible, to choose from:

- they are not made with money but in "material accountability" (as it is made inside the companies nowadays), it doesn't lead to the creation/destruction of money
- we include in the monetary mass, the value of all the products that companies buy to one another, the companies are then allocated a budget based on their production schedules. The monetary mass is then considerably more important and its allocation calculation amongst the individuals and companies are more tedious.

== Propriety of usage ==
As distributive currency is destroyed as it is being used, it is not possible to accumulate to buy one important goods such as houses, private property is not possible. The idea is to work in one distributive economy with a propriety of usage (French: propriété d'usage). This way, everyone is master in his own home, not evictable (when he can live elsewhere, he chooses a new home amongst those that are available and abandon all rights regarding the old home which is then available to others). This allows a great tranquility (in comparison with the capitalist system, in which many people are not assured of success in being able to pay their rent or house loan payments, each and everyone being assured to earn their universal allowance.

Also, the land is owned by those who labour it. And the companies to those who work in it (those are cooperatives).

== Bibliography ==
- Duboin, Jacques (1946). Économie distributive de l'abondance, Mesures transitoires, réponses aux objections (in French). Paris: OCIA. OCLC 83769108.
- Duboin, Jacques; Lambert, Jean-Paul (1998). Le socialisme distributiste : Jacques Duboin, 1878-1976 (in French). Paris: L'Harmattan. ISBN 2-7384-6470-X. OCLC 301587676.
