= M 24 =

M 24 was a political movement in the People's Republic of Congo. The grouping emerged from a strike organized on March 24, 1976. The March 24 strike had demanded the rehabilitation of the Central Committee of the Congolese Party of Labour (PCT). The leaders of the strike were arrested. The name 'M 24' was accorded by the Congolese Students Association (AEC) in France in reference to the coalition who backed the March 24 strike.

Leading figures of the M 24 network include Pierre Nzé (former no. 2 of PCT), Jean-Jules Okabando (former leader of the Congolese Socialist Youth Union), Anatole Khondo and Nicodème Ekamba-Elombé (trade unionists).

When a new PCT Central Committee was elected in 1979, two members of the M 24 network (Nzé and Okabando) were included. The M 24 network was weakened in the mid-1980s as Denis Sassou Nguesso strengthened his influence, and Nzé was excluded from the government. In 1987 Nzé left the PCT Politburo. He was not included in the PCT Central Committee elected in 1989.
