= Elections in the Sahrawi Arab Democratic Republic =

Elections in the Sahrawi Arab Democratic Republic are regularly held by the government-in-exile at a national, regional and local level. Elections are considered to be held under a non-partisan participatory democratic regime, as the Sahrawi Arab Democratic Republic (SADR) and the Polisario Front (the sole legally recognised political movement in the SADR, which leads to a de-facto one-party state) structures are parallel.

The SADR claims the Western Sahara, a territory largely occupied by Morocco since Spain abandoned it in 1975. The sovereignty over Western Sahara is unresolved: the territory is contested by Morocco and the Polisario Front (Popular Front for the Liberation of the Saguia el Hamra and Río de Oro), a national liberation movement which formally proclaimed a government-in-exile in 27 February 1976. The United Nations, which considers Western Sahara to be a non-self-governing territory, has attempted to hold a referendum on the issue through the United Nations Mission for the Referendum in Western Sahara (MINURSO), which administered a ceasefire in place between September 1991 and November 2020.

The Constitution of the SADR, proclaimed in 1976 and amended several times, stipulates that the current political system is an emergency mechanism, with the intention to establish a multi-party system as soon as the SADR manages to establish its authority in all of Western Sahara. The Polisario would then either be dissolved or transformed into an ordinary political party based on an extraordinary Congress.

== History ==
The Polisario Front organised several refugee camps (located in Tindouf, Algeria, the only neighbouring country friendly with Polisario) to accommodate the Sahrawi refugees fleeing the Western Sahara War. After the proclamation of the Sahrawi Arab Democratic Republic on 27 February 1976, the camps were administered as part of the newly created Sahrawi nation-state, the Sahrawi Arab Democratic Republic.

The political system established has been described as a participatory democracy, where the main space of political participation was open discussion meetings organised for all citizens to attend voluntarily, and in which they are free to express their opinions and put questions to the government representatives running the meeting, who are responsible to pass on the views and suggestions of the local population. The open discussion meetings, known as political meetings, (Note: Arabic: الندوات السياسية, romanised: al-nadawat al-siyāsīya) are held before elections and congresses of organisations (women, trade union, youth...).

Direct elections were held to the newly formed Sahrawi National Council and to the heads of the districts (Note: Arabic: دوائر, romanised: dawāʾir, lit. 'circles') and municipalities (Note: Arabic: بلديات, romanised: baladiyāt, de facto neighbourhoods in the refugee camps) of the Sahrawi refugee camps, with the heads of regions (Note: Arabic: ولايات, romanised: wilāyāt) being appointed by the President of the Sahrawi Arab Democratic Republic. Municipalities have been established in the Liberated Territories, but elections haven't been held there.

== Presidential election ==
The President of the Sahrawi Arab Democratic Republic is elected by the Congress of the Polisario Front, together with the National Secretariat, which is the most important decision-making organism inside the Polisario Front when Congresses are not held. The President of the SADR is also the General Secretary of the Polisario Front.

To be elected General-Secretary of the Polisario Front and thus President of the SADR the following requirements have to be met:

Requirements
- Being a Sahrawi national.
- Having a militant experience of at least twenty years and have held positions in the national leadership for at least ten years.
- Having military experience during the war.
- Being at least 40 years old.
- Having a clean criminal record.

The candidates are proposed by the Election Commission, and voted on by the Congress. The vote is done by ballot directly and secretly, with a supermajority of at least two-thirds of the vote required to win the first round and an absolute majority for the second round.

== Legislative election ==
Legislative elections are held for the Sahrawi National Council, legally considered the successor of the colonial Yema'a. The election system has varied several times.

To be elected to the Sahrawi National Council the following requirements (as set in Article 82 of the 2023 Constitution) have to be met:

Requirements
- Being a Sahrawi national.
- Having a clean criminal record.
- Being at least 25 years old.
- Being a political supervisor performing their duties in the institution they supervise when submitting their candidacy file.
- Having a university degree or a two-year specialised certificate, in addition to five years of work or a professional experience of no less than five years in one or more of the following jobs:
  - Member of the Sahrawi National Council for one or more terms;
  - Regional staff in the army and above;
  - Ambassador, representative or a head of a diplomatic mission at a country level;
  - Member of a regional council or above;
  - Basic branch secretary or mayor or above;
  - Member of the executive office of a mass organisation for at least a full term;
  - Former secretary of a mass organisation.

Elections are held on the basis of direct and universal suffrage using the single non-transferable vote election system with a gender quota reserving seats to women. Members can be re-elected but cannot assume any other public office while serving as Members of the National Council. Members come from constituencies based either on the districts of the refugee camps or the military regions of the SADR; while mass organisations and the Consultative Council get seats reserved. The President of the National Council is elected from outside of the members from candidates proposed by the National Secretariat of the Polisario Front.

- 2023 Sahrawi legislative election
- 2020 Sahrawi legislative election
- 2016 Sahrawi legislative election
- 2012 Sahrawi legislative election
- 2008 Sahrawi legislative election

== See also ==
- Politics of the Sahrawi Arab Democratic Republic
- Sahrawi National Council
