= List of members of the Sahrawi National Council, 2020–2023 =

This is a list of members of the Sahrawi National Council after the 2020 Sahrawi legislative election.

== Members ==
=== Military regions ===
Constituency	Member	Party	Gender	Term
1st military region	Brahim Maulud (Note: Arabic: إبراهيم مولود)	POLISARIO	M	17 March 2020–present
2nd military region	Abdallah Lamn El Murji (Note: Arabic: عبد الله لمن المرخي)	POLISARIO	M	17 March 2020–present
3rd military region	Huari El Tayeb (Note: Arabic: هواري الطيب)	POLISARIO	M	17 March 2020–present
4th military region	Yarbi Mohamed El Husein (Note: Arabic: يربى محمد الحسين)	POLISARIO	M	17 March 2020–present
5th military region	El Bandir Omar Joli (Note: Arabic: البندير عمار جولي)	POLISARIO	M	17 March 2020–present
6th military region	Sidi El Mahdi Abderrahman (Note: Arabic: سيدي المهدي عبد الرحمن)	POLISARIO	M	17 March 2020–present
7th military region	Sidiya El Rahel (Note: Arabic: سيديا الراحل)	POLISARIO	M	17 March 2020–present
Military at-large	El Heiba Ezueida El Aymar (Note: Arabic: الهيبة ازويدة العيمار)	POLISARIO	M	17 March 2020–present
Military at-large	Salek Mohamed El Mahdi (Baba) (Note: Arabic: السالك محمد المهدي (بابا))	POLISARIO	M	17 March 2020–present
Military at-large	Yehdih Cheij Embarek (Note: Arabic: يحظيه الشيخ أمبارك)	POLISARIO	M	17 March 2020–present

=== Wilayas ===
Constituency	Member	Party	Gender	Term
Bojador	Embarca Brahim Bujem'a (Note: Arabic: أمباركة إبراهيم بوجمعة)	POLISARIO	F	17 March 2020–present
Bojador	Rabab Did El Bujari (Note: Arabic: الرباب الديد البخاري)	POLISARIO	F	17 March 2020–present
Bojador	Salem Mohamed Ahmed (Note: Arabic: سالم محمد احمد)	POLISARIO	M	17 March 2020–present
Dajla	Mohamed Salem Aali Mohamed Saleh (Asueilum) (Note: Arabic: محمد سالم اعلي محمد صالح (اسيلوم))	POLISARIO	M	17 March 2020–present
Dajla	Najem Cheij Efnidu (Note: Arabic: الناجم الشيخ افنيدو)	POLISARIO	M	17 March 2020–present
Dajla	Aalia Wadha Mohamed Vadel (Note: Arabic: العالية ودهة محمد فاضل)	POLISARIO	F	17 March 2020–present
Dajla	Brahim Salem Mohamed Lemin (Note: Arabic: إبراهيم السالم محمد لمين)	POLISARIO	M	17 March 2020–present
Dajla	Koria Abdallah Ahmed (Note: Arabic: الكورية عبدالله احمد)	POLISARIO	F	17 March 2020–present
Dajla	Enueiniha Mohamed Salem Mohamed (Note: Arabic: انوينيهة محمد سالم محمد)	POLISARIO	F	17 March 2020–present
Dajla	Monina Sid'Ahmed Baba (Hayat) (Note: Arabic: منينة سيداحمد بابا (حياة))	POLISARIO	F	17 March 2020–present
Auserd	Zein Brahim El Saleh (Note: Arabic: الزين ابراهيم الصالح)	POLISARIO	M	17 March 2020–present
Auserd	Ahmed Buzid Baba Hammu (Note: Arabic: أحمد بزيد بابا حمو)	POLISARIO	M	17 March 2020–present
Auserd	Akka Haddi Mohamed Salem (Note: Arabic: أكة حدي محمد سالم)	POLISARIO	F	17 March 2020–present
Auserd	Bechir Halla Ismail (Note: Arabic: البشير حلة اسماعيل)	POLISARIO	M	17 March 2020–present
Auserd	Aicha Cheij Embarek Sidi Baba (Note: Arabic: عيشة الشيخ أمبارك سيدي بابا)	POLISARIO	F	17 March 2020–present
Auserd	Jadiyetu Mahmud Mennu (Note: Arabic: خديجتو محمود منو)	POLISARIO	F	17 March 2020–present
Smara	Brahim Salem Mohamed Abdallah (Note: Arabic: إبراهيم السالم محمد عبدالله)	POLISARIO	M	17 March 2020–present
Smara	Nagia Bida Ezubir (Note: Arabic: النگية بيدة ازوبير)	POLISARIO	F	17 March 2020–present
Smara	Rouba Mohamed Said (Note: Arabic: رعبة محمد سعيد)	POLISARIO	F	17 March 2020–present
Smara	Salma Mamuni Hala (Note: Arabic: السالمة ماموني هلة)	POLISARIO	F	17 March 2020–present
Smara	Ahmed Badi Mohamed Salem (Note: Arabic: أحمد بادي محمد سالم)	POLISARIO	M	17 March 2020–present
Smara	Mahfud El Buhali (Note: Arabic: المحفوظ البوهالي)	POLISARIO	M	17 March 2020–present
Smara	Fatimetu Ebah Ahmed (Note: Arabic: فاطمتو اباه محمد)	POLISARIO	F	17 March 2020–present
Political and Administrative Unit "Martyr Hafed Bujam'a"	Mohamed Mohamed Ismail (Note: Arabic: محمد محمد اسماعيل)	POLISARIO	M	17 March 2020–present
Political and Administrative Unit "Martyr Hafed Bujam'a"	Cheija Lulad (Note: Arabic: شيخة لولاد)	POLISARIO	M	17 March 2020–present
Political and Administrative Unit "Martyr Hafed Bujam'a"	Abeida Hadhiya Aali (Note: Arabic: اعبيدة حظية اعلي)	POLISARIO	F	17 March 2020–present
Political and Administrative Unit "Martyr Hafed Bujam'a"	Bella Mohamed Salem Ameilid (Note: Arabic: بلة محمد سالم اميليد)	POLISARIO	M	17 March 2020–present
El Aaiún	Enehbuha Mahmud Aaliwa (Note: Arabic: انحبوها محمود أعليوة)	POLISARIO	F	17 March 2020–present
El Aaiún	Jalihelna Ahmed Ghazuani (Note: Arabic: خليهنة احمد الغزواني)	POLISARIO	M	17 March 2020–present
El Aaiún	Valla El Karkar (Note: Arabic: فالة الكركار)	POLISARIO	F	17 March 2020–present
El Aaiún	Cheij El Mehdi (Note: Arabic: الشيخ المهدي)	POLISARIO	M	17 March 2020–present
El Aaiún	Jadu Bechir El Haj (Note: Arabic: خدو البشير الحاج)	POLISARIO	F	17 March 2020–present
El Aaiún	Karama El Dich (Note: Arabic: كرامة الديش)	POLISARIO	F	17 March 2020–present

=== Mass organisations ===
Constituency	Member	Party	Gender	Term
National Union of Sahrawi Women	Chaba Sini Brahim (Note: Arabic: الشابة سيني ابراهيم)	POLISARIO	F	17 March 2020–present
Sahrawi Youth Union	El Mehdi Mohamed Cheij (Note: Arabic: المهدي محمد الشيخ)	POLISARIO	M	17 March 2020–present
Sahrawi Trade Union	Ahmuda Hamda El Zein (Note: Arabic: احمودة حمدة الزين)	POLISARIO	M	17 March 2020–present

=== Consultative Council ===
Constituency	Member	Party	Gender	Term
Consultative Council	El Magveri Ellu Asueilem (Note: Arabic: المغفري اللو اسويلم) (Note: President of the Consultative Council)	POLISARIO	M	17 March 2020–present
Consultative Council	Sidiya Aabeilil (Note: Arabic: سيديا اعبيليل) (Note: Vice-president of the Consultative Council)	POLISARIO	M	17 March 2020–present
Consultative Council	Mulay Aali El Dajil (Note: Arabic: مولاي اعلي الدخيل)	POLISARIO	M	17 March 2020–present
Consultative Council	Embarec Lehdib (Note: Arabic: امبارك لهديب)	POLISARIO	M	17 March 2020–present
Consultative Council	Saleh Cheij Aali (Note: Arabic: الصالح الشيخ اعلي)	POLISARIO	M	17 March 2020–present

== Footnotes ==
Below is a list of the original names of the elected members in Arabic, as the transcriptions (done using Spanish orthography as usual in the Sahrawi Republic) are manually done and thus might be inaccurate.
