= List of members of the Sahrawi National Council, 2023–2026 =

This is a list of members of the Sahrawi National Council elected after the 2023 Sahrawi legislative election.

Electoral district	Member		Gender	New (compared to 2020)
Electoral district	Name	Arabic	Gender	New (compared to 2020)
Auserd	Zein Brahim Saleh	الزين ابراهيم الصالح	M	No
Auserd	Mohamed Bah Ali	محمد اباه عالي	M	Yes
Auserd	Tekber Mohamed Nafe	تكبر محمد نافع	F	Yes
Auserd	Bachir Hel-la Smail	البشير حلة اسماعيل	M	No
Auserd	Fatimetu Mohamed Lamin Ahmed	فاطمتو محمد لمين احمد	F	Yes
Auserd	Agga Haddi Mohamed Salem	اقة حدي محمد سالم	F	No
Chahid El Hafed administrative camp	Mohamed Mohamed Ismael Sannad	محمد محمد اسماعيل سناد	M	No
Chahid El Hafed administrative camp	Abida Hadía Ali	اعبيدة حظية اعلي	F	No
Chahid El Hafed administrative camp	Limam Ramdan	ليمام رمضان	M	Yes
Chahid El Hafed administrative camp	Said Mohamed Salem	سعيد محمد سالم	M	Yes
Bojador	Salek Emboirik	السالك امبيريك	M	Yes
Bojador	Embarka Brahim Bumajruta	امباركة إبراهيم بومخروطة	F	No
Bojador	Aziza Mohamed Lamin Jatri	أعزيزة محمد لمين خطري	F	Yes
Dajla	Mohamed Salem Ali Mohamed Saleh	محمد سالم اعلي محمد صالح (سيلوم)	M	No
Dajla	Jatri Mohamed Salem	خطري محمد سالم	M	Yes
Dajla	Mohamed Lamin Abdelahi	محمد لمين عبد الله	M	Yes
Dajla	Fatima Mohamed Embarek Limam	فاطمة محمد امبارك لمام	F	Yes
Dajla	Alia Wadha Mohamed Fadel	العالية ودها محمد فاظل	F	Yes
Dajla	Mzeiriga Blal	مزيريكة ابلال	F	Yes
Dajla	Nueniha Mohamed Salem Matala	انوينهة محمد سالم	F	No
El Aaiún	Jadiyetu Bachir Mohamed Fadel	خدو البشير محمد فاضل (خدو الحاج)	F	No
El Aaiún	Tfeiluha Moulud Embarek	اطفيلوهة مولود أمبارك	F	Yes
El Aaiún	Faila Mohamed Ali	أفيلة محمد اعلي (فالة الكركار)	F	No
El Aaiún	Maainafiha Said El Majlul	معينفيها سعيد المخلول	F	Yes
El Aaiún	Said Abba Bumrah	سعيد أبا بومراح	M	Yes
El Aaiún	Enhebuha Mahmud Ali	أنحبوهة محمود عالي	F	No
Smara	Dih Noucha	الديه النوشة	M	Yes
Smara	Dumaha Mohamed El Mati	دماحة محمد المعطي	F	Yes
Smara	Barka Sehla Larosi	بركة سهلة لعروسي	M	Yes
Smara	Jadya Barka Brahim	خدجة بركة ابراهيم	F	Yes
Smara	Brahim Salem Mohamed Abdelahi	ابراهيم السالم محمد عبدالله	M	No
Smara	Selma Mamuni	السالمة ماموني	F	No
Smara	Embarka Malainin Zreiguina	امباركة ماء العينين ازريگينة	F	Yes
First military region (Zug)	Turad Bahaha	التراد بهاهة	M	Yes
Second military region (Tifariti)	Abdelahi El Merji	عبد الله المرخي	M	No
Third military region (Mijek)	Mohamed Ahmed Salem Busekin	محمد احمد سالم بوسكين	M	Yes
Fourth military region (Mehaires)	Mohamed Salem Mustafa (Buessa)	محمد سالم مصطفى (ابيصة)	M	Yes
Fifth military region (Bir Lehlu)	Uld El Erwa	ولد العروة	M	Yes
Sixth military region (Dougaj)	Mohamed Yudu Omar	محمد جودو عمار	M	Yes
Seventh military region (Agüenit)	Hamdi Balla	حمدي بلة	M	Yes
Reserve	Yahdih Chej Embarek	احظية الشيخ امبارك	M	No
Military rear	Salek Mohamed Mehdi	السالك محمد المهدي (بابا)	M	No
Military rear	Kenti Day	الكنتي الداي	M	Yes
National Union of Sahrawi Women (UNMS)	Mahyuba Mohamed Saleh	محجوبة محمد صالح	F	Yes
Sahrawi Trade Union (UGTSARIO)	Samu Ahmed Salem Mohamedu	سامو احمد سالم محمدو	M	Yes
Sahrawi Youth Union (UJSARIO)	Mohamed Salem Ahmedu Salimeya	محمد سالم احمدو سالمية	M	Yes
Sahrawi Student Union (UESARIO)	Raabub Keddi	الرعبوب كدي	F	Yes
Consultive Council	Saleh Chej Ali	الصالح الشيخ اعلي	M	No
Consultive Council	Mohamed Fadel Mueilid	محمد فاضل مويليد	M	Yes
Consultive Council	Abdlekrim Mohamed Salem Moulud	عبد الكريم محمد سالم مولود	M	Yes
President of the National Council	Hamma Salama	حمة سلامة	M	No
