= 2020 Sahrawi legislative election =

- 8–9 March 2020

52 (of the 53) seats in the National Council 27 seats needed for a majority
- Registered: ~100,000
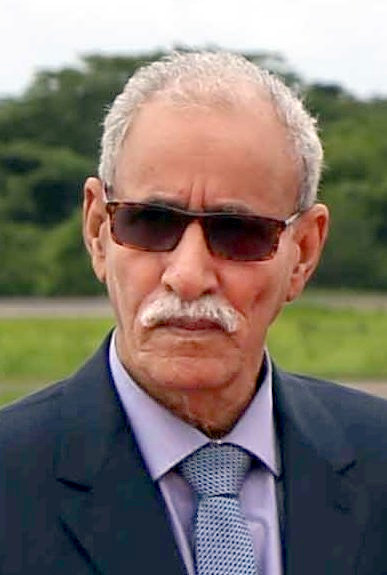
	First party
Leader	Brahim Ghali
Party	Polisario
Leader's seat	Did not stand (Note: Brahim Ghali is the Secretary General of the POLISARIO Front and President of the Sahrawi Arab Democratic Republic, thus he doesn't run for a seat.)
Last election	53 seats
Seats won	53 seats
Seat change	Steady
Percentage	100%
President of the National Council before election
Khatri Addouh
Polisario
President-elect
Hamma Salama
Polisario

Legislative elections were held in the Sahrawi Republic on 8–9 March 2020 to elect 52 of the 53 members of the Sahrawi National Council, the unicameral parliament of the SADR. More than 100,000 Sahrawis were registered to vote, with 145 candidates contesting the elections.

== Election system ==
Legislative elections in the Sahrawi Republic are organised mainly using a single non-transferable vote, as Sahrawis get one vote by checking a box next to the face of the candidate in the ballot. Members are elected for a three-year term by direct universal suffrage.

35 seats are elected in constituencies based on the wilayas (or regions) that the Sahrawi refugee camps are divided in, while seven seats are elected in constituencies based on the seven military regions that the Sahrawi liberated territories are divided and another 3 are elected representing soldiers of the Sahrawi People's Liberation Army (EPLS) at large.

Three members are elected in representation of three branches of the Polisario Front: one representing the National Union of Sahrawi Women (UNMS), one representing the Sahrawi Youth Union (UJSARIO) and one representing the Sahrawi Trade Union (UGTSARIO). The final 5 seats are elected by members of the Consultative Council, a consultative body to the President of the SADR.

== Results ==
Graph of the party split among 53 seats.
Party	Seats	+/–
Polisario Front	53	0
Total	53	0

== Aftermath ==
Hamma Salama, a member of POLISARIO's national secretariat, was elected President of the Sahrawi National Council on 17 March 2020 during the constitutive session of the National Council. Salama won the vote against the Minister of Transport and Energy Salek Baba Hasana.
