= 2012 Sahrawi legislative election =

Elections to the Sahrawi National Council were held between 19 and 21 February 2012. The elections were only held in the Free Zone of Western Sahara and in Sahrawi refugee camps in Algeria, the rest of Western Sahara being under the de facto administration of Morocco. The elections were held after the 13th Congress of the Polisario Front, which took place two months earlier between 15 and 22 December 2011. The percentage of young people in the new Council stood at 42%, while women gained 25% of seats. Khatri Addouh was reelected Speaker of the Council on 28 February 2012.

== See also ==
- Elections in the Sahrawi Arab Democratic Republic
- 2008 Sahrawi legislative election
