= 2023 Sahrawi legislative election =

SADR election

- 8–9 April 2023 (Note: The President of the Sahrawi National Council was elected on 18 April 2023.)

50 (of the 51) seats in the National Council 26 seats needed for a majority
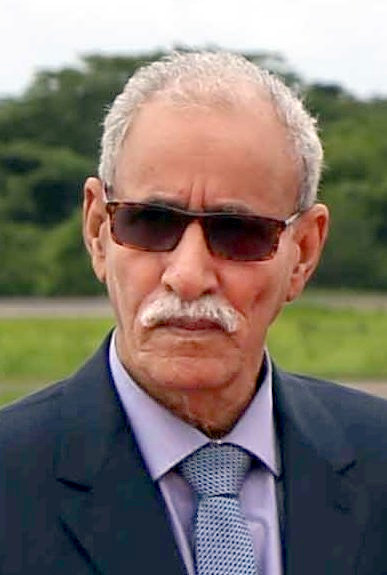
	First party
Leader	Brahim Ghali
Party	Polisario
Leader's seat	Did not stand (Note: Brahim Ghali is the Secretary General of the POLISARIO Front and President of the Sahrawi Arab Democratic Republic, thus he doesn't run for a seat.)
Last election	53 seats
Seats won	51 seats
Seat change	▼2
Percentage	100%
President of the National Council before election
Hamma Salama
Polisario
President-elect
Hamma Salama
Polisario

Legislative elections were held in the Sahrawi Republic on 8–9 April 2023 to elect 50 of the 51 members of the Sahrawi National Council, the unicameral parliament of the SADR.

== Election system ==
To be elected to the Sahrawi National Council the following requirements (as set in Article 82 of the 2023 Constitution) have to be met:

- Being a Sahrawi national.
- Having a clean criminal record.
- Being at least 25 years old.
- Being a political supervisor performing their duties in the institution they supervise when submitting their candidacy file.
- Having a university degree or a two-year specialised certificate, in addition to five years of work or a professional experience of no less than five years in one or more of the following jobs:
  - Member of the Sahrawi National Council for one or more terms;
  - Regional staff in the army and above;
  - Ambassador, representative or a head of a diplomatic mission at a country level;
  - Member of a regional council or above;
  - Basic branch secretary or mayor or above;
  - Member of the executive office of a mass organization for at least a full term;
  - Former secretary of a mass organization.

Elections are held on the basis of direct and universal suffrage using the single non-transferable vote election system with a gender quota reserving seats to women. Members can be re-elected but cannot assume any other public office while serving as Members of the National Council. Members come from constituencies based either on the districts of the refugee camps or the military regions of the SADR; while mass organisations and the Consultative Council get seats reserved. The President of the National Council is elected from outside of the members from candidates proposed by the National Secretariat of the Polisario Front.

District		MPs	WQ
Sahrawi refugee camps constituencies
Auserd		6	3
Chahid El Hafed administrative camp		4	1
Bojador		3	2
Dajla		7	4
El Aaiún		6	3
Smara		7	4
Military regions (Liberated Territories)
First	Zug	1	—N/a
Second	Tifariti	1	—N/a
Third	Mijek	1	—N/a
Fourth	Mehaires	1	—N/a
Fifth	Bir Lehlu	1	—N/a
Sixth	Dougaj	1	—N/a
Seventh	Agüenit	1	—N/a
Reserve		1	—N/a
Military rear		2	—N/a
Mass organisations of the Polisario Front
National Union of Sahrawi Women (UNMS)		1	1
Sahrawi Trade Union (UGTSARIO)		1	—N/a
Sahrawi Youth Union (UJSARIO)		1	—N/a
Sahrawi Student Union (UESARIO)		1	—N/a
Administration of the Sahrawi Republic
Consultative Council		3	—N/a
President of the National Council		1	—N/a

== Results ==
Party	Seats	+/–
Polisario Front	51	▼2
Total	51	▼2

Results by incumbency
New	64.7%
Incumbent	35.3%

Results by gender
Men	56.9%
Women	43.1%

== Aftermath ==
Hamma Salama, a member of POLISARIO's national secretariat, was elected President of the Sahrawi National Council for a second term on 18 April 2023 during the constitutive session of the National Council. Salama won the vote against Bachir Mustafa Sayed and Jira Bulahi.
