= Politics of the Sahrawi Arab Democratic Republic =

The politics of the Sahrawi Arab Democratic Republic refers to politics of the Polisario Front's proclaimed Sahrawi Arab Democratic Republic, a country in North Africa with limited recognition by other states, controlling parts of the Western Sahara region.

The Sahrawi Arab Democratic Republic claims the whole Western Sahara, a territory most of which is currently occupied by Morocco. SADR control some part of the territory, called the Free Zone. Its government seats in Tindouf, Algeria.

According to its Constitution, the Sahrawi Arab Democratic Republic (SADR) is a form of one-party state, as long as it is not in control of its territory. The organization backing the republic is the Polisario Front, the Popular Front for the Liberation of Saguia el-Hamra and Río de Oro (Frente Popular de Liberación de Saguía el Hamra y Río de Oro), but it has declared that it will either transform into a normal political party among others, or split into several parties in the eventuality of an independent Western Sahara.

== History ==
Colonized by Spain from 1884 to 1975, as Spanish Sahara, and after the tripartite agreement, known as the Madrid Accords, the territory was partitioned between Morocco and Mauritania in 1976, with Morocco acquiring northern two-thirds. Mauritania, under pressure from Polisario guerrillas, abandoned all claims to its portion in August 1979, with Morocco moving to take control of that sector shortly thereafter and has since asserted administrative control over the majority of the territory. The Polisario front's SADR claims to administer a portion to the east of the Moroccan Wall. The Polisario's government-in-exile was seated as member of the Organisation of African Unity in 1984, and was a founding member of the African Union. Guerrilla activities continued until a United Nations-monitored cease-fire was implemented on September 6, 1991, via the mission MINURSO. The mission patrols the separation line between the two territories (maps: , , ).

In 2000, The UN's envoy to the territory, James Baker, presented a third way option to solve the conflict, known as the Framework Agreement or Baker plan I, consisting in a devolution of the Moroccan state of many of its prerogatives to an autonomous Western Sahara within Moroccan sovereignty. Morocco accepted the plan, while Algeria and the Polisario Front rejected it. Algeria proposed a partition of the territory instead.

In 2003, James Baker, presented the Baker Plan II, which would have given Western Sahara immediate autonomy as the Western Sahara Authority during a five-year transition period to prepare for a referendum, offering the inhabitants of the territory a choice between independence, autonomy within the Kingdom of Morocco, or complete integration with Morocco. Polisario has accepted the plan, but Morocco has rejected it.

== Executive branch ==
The Government of the Sahrawi Arab Democratic Republic is headed by President and Prime Minister.

Main office-holders
| Office | Name | Party | Since |
|---|---|---|---|
| President | Brahim Ghali | Polisario Front | 9 July 2016 |
| Prime Minister | Bouchraya Hammoudi Bayoun | Polisario Front | 13 January 2020 |

== Legislative branch ==
The Sahrawi National Council (Consejo Nacional Saharaui) is the legislature of the Sahrawi Arab Democratic Republic government in exile. It has 53 members, elected for a two-year term in 11 constituencies.

== Elections ==
The Sahrawi population in the refugee camps in Algeria as well as in the Free Zone participates in elections to the institutions of the Sahrawi Arab Democratic Republic. An election for the Sahrawi National Council took place in February 2012. A referendum on independence or integration with Morocco was agreed upon by Morocco and the Sahrawi republic in 1991, but did not take place due to the parties' divergence on who should be allowed to vote.

== Foreign relations ==
The foreign relations of the Sahrawi Arab Democratic Republic are conducted by the Polisario Front, which maintains a network of representation offices and embassies in foreign countries. It has conducted diplomatic relations with states and international organizations since its inception in 1973.

In 1966, United Nations General Assembly Resolution 22/29 affirmed for the first time the Sahrawi right on self-determination. In 1979, United Nations General Assembly Resolution 34/37 reaffirmed again the right of the Western Sahara people to self-determination and independence, recognizing also the Polisario Front as the representative of the Western Sahara people.

== See also ==
- Political status of Western Sahara
- Legal status of Western Sahara
