= Hamma Salama =

Sahrawi politician

- حمة سلامة

Chief of the General Staff of the Sahrawi People's Liberation Army
- Incumbent
- Assumed office 23 March 2026
- President: Brahim Ghali
- Preceded by: Mohamed Wali Akeik

President of the Sahrawi National Council
- In office 17 March 2020 – 28 March 2026
- Preceded by: Khatri Addouh
- Succeeded by: Bashir Mustafa Sayed

Personal details
- Born: c. 1950s Laayoune, Western Sahara
- Party: Polisario Front

Hamma Salama (Arabic: حمة سلامة; born c. 1950s) is a Sahrawi politician and former military officer serving as the Chief of the General Staff of the Sahrawi People's Liberation Army since March 2026.

== Biography ==
Salama was born in Laayoune, Western Sahara. When he was in his 20s, he left his hometown due to the Western Sahara conflict and joined the Polisario Front, serving in the military and fighting against Morocco. He rose to the rank of commander of the 3rd military region of the Sahrawi Arab Democratic Republic, living in Mijek in the Free Zone.

Salama was a member of the National Secretariat by 1999. As of 2011, Salama, who remained commander of the 3rd military region, was in his 50s and was described as "the representation of those old Arab revolutionary forces that by now belong to the past: cultured, knowledgeable ... Progressive and a fighter, Salama was solid and calm." In c. 2012, he was moved to being commander of the 2nd region.

In c. 2015, Salama became the Minister for the Interior of the SADR. In March 2020, Sahrawi legislative elections were held and Salama, after winning a seat in the Sahrawi National Council, was named by the legislature's members to be the president of the council on 17 March 2020, defeating the other candidate, Salek Baba Hasana. Three years later, he was re-elected following the 2023 Sahrawi legislative election.
