= NUSW =

NUSW may refer to:

- National Union of Sahrawi Women, the women's wing of the Polisario Front
- National Union of Scottish Mineworkers, a Scottish trade union
