= 2008 Sahrawi legislative election =

Elections to the Sahrawi National Council were held between 17 and 19 February 2008. More than 126 candidates competed for the 53 seats in the Council, the unicameral legislature of the partially recognized Sahrawi Arab Democratic Republic. The Council was elected for a period of three years. The elections were only held in the Free Zone of Western Sahara and in Sahrawi refugee camps in Algeria, the rest of Western Sahara being under the de facto administration of Morocco. As stipulated in the Sahrawi constitution, the renewal of the Council occurred after the previous Council was dissolved following the 12th Congress of the Polisario Front, which took place two months earlier between 14 and 21 December 2007. First-time MPs represented 61.53% of those elected. The percentage of young people in the new Council stood at 57.67%, while women gained 34.61% of seats, thanks in part to a quota system. Mahfoud Ali Beiba was reelected Speaker of the Council on 27 February 2008.
