= Front Polisario Khat al-Shahid =

Political party in Western Sahara

Khat al-Shahid حركة خط الشهيد Harakat khati alshahid
- Secretary-General: Mahjoub Salek
- Founder: Mahjoub Salek
- Founded: 4 July 2004
- Split from: Polisario Front
- Headquarters: Tindouf Province, Algeria
- Ideology: Sahrawi nationalism Arab nationalism Maghreb nationalism Pan-maghrebism
- Political position: Centre-left to left-wing
- Colors: Orange

Party flag

Website
- fpjatchahid.org//

Front Polisario Khat al-Shahid (Khat al-Shahid, often with Spanish transliteration as Jat Chahid, is Arabic for Line of the Martyr) is a minor faction within the Front Polisario. It is based in the Sahrawi refugee camps of Tindouf, Algeria, but also claims to have supporters and members in the Sahrawi diaspora in Mauritania, Morocco, Spain, France and various European countries, as well as in the Moroccan-controlled part of Western Sahara.

== Creation and relation to the Polisario Front ==
The organization announced its existence on 4 July 2004, issuing a communiqué named "Call to All the Sahrawi Nationalists". It accused the POLISARIO leadership of "incapacity to confront the invasor" and to "make successive concessions in the mark of the Peace Plan", also blaming the UN for the "dismal failure to implement its resolutions", and Morocco of "intransigence, systematic destruction of the Peace Plan" and "rejecting any hint of a solution out of their sovereignty over Western Sahara". The document noted what Khat al-Shahid (until 2005 known as "Front Polisario El Uali") consider the greatest failures of the Polisario Front direction:

- Use of a fatalist, defensive & negative instead of a brave, offensive & positive one.
- The weakness of the UN & to the enemy by offering this one possibility to continue with its intransigence.
- The lack of initiative has made us lag behind developments, while in the past, with our sacrifice and the blood of our martyrs, we were the protagonists of these initiatives.
- No positive decision has been made since the cease-fire.
- Lack of political will to include new people from the younger generations of scholars in favor of our national cause.
- The gradual discarding of many individuals, both graduates and combat veterans leaders, protagonists of our national glories.
- Scheduled destruction of military force, even though it is the crucial element in ending the conflict.
- The humiliation of the war victims and families of martyrs, left them alone in uncertain and difficult circumstances.
- The General Popular Congresses have become a piece of theatre, whose objective is the consolidation of the actual leadership in power, and the opposition to any sharing of the management of the affairs of the state and the citizens.
- Fraudulent use by some members of the leadership of their positions of responsibility, for their personal affairs in the absence of any control or inspection.

The POLISARIO refused to respond or recognize the organization, insisting that differences be solved within the established system. However, there have been no reports of police intervention against members. Its activities at this stage do not seem to go beyond publishing pamphlets against the present Polisario Front leadership, and while it may affect internal Sahrawi politics, it is of minimal or no significance to the Western Sahara conflict.

Its relation to POLISARIO remains slightly tense. Khat al-Shahid considers itself a reformist movement inside the Polisario Front, and recognizes it as the only legitimate representative of the Sahrawis, until the end of the conflict. Its Tindouf-based members remain active in the SADR administration and armed forces.

== Politics and ideology ==
The Khat al-Shahid uses the slogan "No hero but the people, no leader but the martyr", referring to El-Ouali Mustapha Sayed, the second Secretary-General of Polisario, who was killed in action in Mauritania in 1976. It says it wants to restore El-Ouali legacy ("the line of the Martyr").

The movement has no explicit ideology, apart from seeking Western Sahara's independence, which was the essential objective at the foundation of the Polisario Front on 20 May 1973. A typical statement is its communiqué of 20 May 2005 (the 32nd anniversary of Polisario's first strikes against Spanish colonization), where the group demanded the "end to an occupation, and the raising of the flag of the Sahrawi Arab Democratic Republic over the totality of its national territory". However, marking a difference with the POLISARIO, in its statements, the group emphasizes militancy and revolutionary action. It accuses the present leadership of weakness (decrying its "incapacity to bring the struggle against the invader to a close"), of caving in to Moroccan and UN pressures, and of being undemocratic and corrupt.

The Muhammad Abdelaziz leadership is accused of:

- "propagating corruption, clientelism, tribalism, and for bargaining with the sufferings of the Sahrawi people and the martyrs' blood".
- having no strategies to face international developments.
- being unable to conduct internal reforms.
- having no contact with the population in the Moroccan-controlled part of Western Sahara, and mediatically exploiting their "intifada".
- for refusing to hold the national congress demanded by Khat al-Shahid, where the Polisario leadership would be held accountability for its policy, seeing this as a sign of the undemocratic leadership of the Polisario Front.

Furthermore, the Khat Al-Shahid movement has called on the Polisario Front to spare the budget allocated for celebrations of the 31st anniversary of the Sahrawi republic, and to use it for the benefit of the refugee population. It considers the calls by Abdelaziz to the international community for help as begging. It demanded that persons involved in the misuse, traffic, and spoiling of humanitarian aid be judged.

Khat al-Shahid has repeatedly decried the failure of the United Nations-backed peace process. It accuses the Polisario leadership of "defeatist reasoning" and of caving into pressures (especially in accepting the Baker Plan), claiming that it benefits from the political stagnation caused by the cease fire. It stresses the gains made during the war years (1975–91) and claims the Abdelaziz government has let the Sahrawi army decay during the cease fire, and ignored the plight of veterans and war widows. It also severely criticizes the UN's Minurso mission for being biased in favor of Morocco. For these reasons, Khat al-Shahid has argued that the guerrilla war against Morocco should resume. There seems to exist significant support for this position in the refugee camps, but it is not known if the Khat al-Shahid has successfully managed to exploit that. Overall, support for the organization seems to remain very small.

== International connections ==
Supporters of the present POLISARIO leadership have accused Khat al-Shahid of working for, or being exploited by, the Moroccan government. In a statement on 28 August 2004, the movement hailed the position of "the peoples and government of Algeria" for their "unconditional support to our people in its fair fight", the Moroccan political movement Annahj Addimocrati, for their "respect of the right of our people to self-determination" and the US, for "not recognizing the legitimacy of the Moroccan occupation of Western Sahara", most likely in reference to the Moroccan-American Free Trade Agreement, which excluded Moroccan-held Western Sahara from the areas judged to be under Moroccan sovereignty.

== Mahjoub Salek ==
In 2006, at an interview with the Moroccan weekly TelQuel, the supposed Khat al-Shahid leader, Mahjoub Salek, declared that negotiations were the only way to resolve the conflict, and that all it needed was a signal from King Mohamed VI. He further called on the Moroccan king Mohamed VI to open the doors of his palace to Sahrawis and listen to them in order to end the conflict.

Following the interview, a communiqué explaining that Salek was not the spokesman of the movement signed "Coordination Commission of Khat al-Shahid" appeared on a blog website, declaring that the ideas he brought forth in the TelQuel interview did not represent Khat al-Shahid and that he had been expelled from the organization, having repeatedly broken its internal rules. The origin of the communiqué could not be verified.

Mahjoub Salek (who resides outside of Algeria, mainly between Mauritania and Spain) continues to act as the spokesperson of the movement in different interviews, mostly on Moroccan media, reiterating his declarations in favor of the dialogue with Morocco and against the POLISARIO. In 2011, Mahjoub Salek made a call to the Sahrawi refugees to boycott the XIII POLISARIO General Congress, inviting them to "express their solidarity with the "Libyan revolution" and their firm support to the NTC", criticized the absence of mentions to Libya's situation by the POLISARIO leadership, and reaffirming his support to the Moroccan autonomy plan.

== See also ==
- Polisario Front
- Sahrawi Arab Democratic Republic
- Politics of Western Sahara
- Baker Plan
