= Omar Emboirik Ahmed =

Western Sahara politician

Omar Emboirik Ahmed Abdelahi
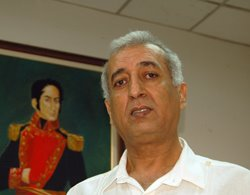
- Omar Emboirik in 2009

Sahrawi Ambassador to Venezuela
- In office 19 August 2008 – 10 November 2012
- Prime Minister: Abdelkader Taleb Omar
- Preceded by: Hach Ahmed Baricalla
- Succeeded by: Mohamed Salem Daha

Personal details
- Born: February 4, 1956 Fuerteventura, Spain
- Party: Polisario Front
- Parent: Dedda Abdalahe Baha (mother)
- Education: University of Las Palmas de Gran Canaria, Spain
- Occupation: Diplomat
- Awards: Order "Gran Cacique Indio Coromotano" (2011) "Waraira Repano" 1st class medal (2012); University of Las Palmas de Gran Canaria honorary degree (2017)

Omar Emboirik Ahmed Abdelahi (born February 4, 1956) was the Sahrawi ambassador to Venezuela until late 2012, also accredited non-resident ambassador to Bolivia and Ecuador, with a base in Caracas.

== Personal life ==
He joined the Polisario Front in 1974, being part of the youth branch UJSARIO during the last part of the Spanish colonial period. He graduated in History at the University of Las Palmas de Gran Canaria, in Canary Islands, Spain.

== Diplomatic postings ==
He started his diplomatic career in 1976, at the Polisario representation in France. Between 1977 and 1980 he joined the Sahrawi embassies in Cuba and Panama. Among 1983 and 1988, he carried punctual diplomatic missions in Germany, Austria, Mexico, Greece, Jamaica, Barbados, Trinidad and Tobago, Costa Rica, Switzerland, Italy and Portugal. From 1988 until 2008, he was the Polisario representative in different Spanish Autonomous Communities, for example in the Canary Islands from the late 1990s to 2002, and between 2002 and 2008 as head of the Polisario representation in Catalonia. In 2008, he was designated as extraordinary and plenipotentiary Sahrawi resident ambassador in Venezuela. On 25 June 2009, he replaced Hach Ahmed Bericalla as the Sahrawi non-resident ambassador accredited to Ecuador. On 24 March 2011, he presented to President Evo Morales the letter of credence as the Sahrawi non-resident ambassador accredited to the Plurinational State of Bolivia.

== Awards and recognitions ==
On March 4, 2011, Emboirik Ahmed was awarded by the town's mayor with the Order "Gran Cacique Indio Coromotano", during a ceremony at Ocumare del Tuy, in Miranda State, Venezuela.

On February 29, 2012, during the celebrations in Caracas of the 36th anniversary of the independence proclamation of the Sahrawi Republic, he was awarded with the "Waraira Repano" 1st class medal by the municipal council.

On February 18, 2017, Emboirik Ahmed was granted an honorary degree by the University of Las Palmas de Gran Canaria (Spain), his alma mater.
