= Fatma El Mehdi =

Sahaurui activist

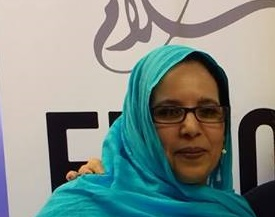
Mehdi in 2016

Fatma El Mehdi (also Fatma Mehdi Hassan) is a Western Saharan activist. She is currently the secretary general of the National Union of Sahrawi Women. El Mehdi is also the first Western Saharan woman to attend a United Nations conference for women's rights. She has also served as president of the Women's Committee and Equality in Economic, Social and African Cultural Council (ECOSOCC). El Mehdi has lived in an Algerian refugee camp for about forty years.

== Background ==
Fatma El Mehdi grew up within the ongoing conflict of Western Sahara conflict between the Sahrawi Arab Democratic Republic/Polisario Front and the Kingdom of Morocco. During the conflict, Saharawi women established and administered a national network that was associated with administrative ministries, educational institutions, mass civil unions, and local councils that reorganized the political and social order of Western Sahara after their national revolution. She was born in Smara, Es Semara Province, Laâyoune-Sakia El Hamra, Western Sahara, previous Morocco in 1969.

== Childhood ==
When Fatma El Mehdi was seven, in 1975, she was evacuated from El Aaiún, escaping amidst bombs and napalm. She walked for days with a small group of men and women without food or water until she came to one of the first Sahrawi refugee camps.

== Career ==
Today, Fatma El Mehdi is the Secretary-General of The National Union of Saharawi Women in New York. She is there to share the history, story and dreams of her compatriots from Western Sahara. El Mehdi is also the first Western Saharan woman to attend the United Nations conference for women's rights.

== Bibliography ==
1. Kouddous, Sharif Abdel. "Letter From Western Sahara, a Land Under Occupation." The Nation. 11/4/13.
