= Constitution of the Sahrawi Arab Democratic Republic =

Constitutional document

A constitution of the Sahrawi Arab Democratic Republic (SADR) was first promulgated in 1976, but it has been revised several times since then. The last major redrafting came in 1991, but this version was further changed by the Sahrawi National Council — the SADR's parliament in exile — in 1995 and 1999.

The constitution provides for a separation of powers between judicial, legislative, and executive branches. It names Arabic as the national language and Islam as the state religion, and grants every citizen freedom of speech and the right to property. It further determines that an independent Western Sahara will be a multiparty democracy with a market economy. Presently, however, the constitution ties the SADR to the Polisario Front, which is working to establish an independent Western Sahara. For example, the Secretary General of the Polisario Front (now Brahim Ghali) is constitutionally identical to the President of the Sahrawi Arab Democratic Republic, until the achievement of independence.

This is because the constitution differentiates between before and after the Western Sahara is independent. Thus, several clauses will not come into effect until the proclamation of independence, and various changes in the political order will then occur (see e.g. articles 9, 10, 30, 31, 45). Among other things, the constitution details a transitional phase after independence has been declared (see articles 130–133, Chapter Three ) in which the POLISARIO is detached from the republic and transformed into a political party among others. As such, the SADR remains a dominant-party system.

For information on the institutions and elections that are regulated in the constitution of the SADR, see here and here. For information on the political institutions of the Polisario Front, see here.

== Preamble ==
The following is an English translation of the 1999 version preamble of the Constitution of the SADR.

The Sahrawi people – an Arab, African and Muslim people – who decided to launch their liberation war in 1973, under the leadership of the POLISARIO Front, to liberate their country from colonialism – and end the occupation – resolute in that way in a long resistance in which they have never stopped during their history to defend their liberty and their dignity, proclaim:

their resolve to pursues the struggle for the perfection of the sovereignty of the Sahrawi Arab Democratic Republic (SADR) and the integrity of their national territory;

their respect for the principles of justice and democracy contained in the Universal Declaration of the Rights of Man (of 10 December 1948), in the African Charter on Human Rights and Peoples' Rights (of 26 June 1981) and in the international treaties entered by SADR;

their conviction that the liberty and the dignity of man is not possible except in a society where the rule of law is sovereign and where the conditions for social development are created in conformity with the values of a stable society, the said society, its civilisation, its religion, its national culture, as well as the requirements of the modern world;

their determination to create democratic institutions that guarantee liberty and fundamental human rights, economic and social rights, the rights of the family, the basic unit of society;

their belief in the necessity of building a Great Maghreb, of concreting the unity of the work of Africa, the unity of the Arab nation and to establish international relations based on cooperation, concord, mutual respect and the establishment of peace in the world.

== General principles ==
The following is an English translation of the 1999 version General principles of the Constitution of the SADR.

- 1st Chapter: Saguia el-Hamra y Rio de Oro

Art. 1: Western Sahara in its internationally recognized borders is an indivisible democratic republic, named Sahrawi Arab Democratic Republic (SADR).
Art. 2: Islam is the state religion and law origin.
Art. 3: Arabic language is the official national language.
Art. 4: The capital of the country is El Aaiun.
Art. 5: The flag, national anthem, and SADR's coat of arms are defined by law.

- 2nd Chapter: People

Art. 6: The Sahrawi people is an Arab, African and Muslim people.
Art. 7: The family is the base of the society, funded on the values of Islam and ethics.
Art. 8: The sovereignty belong to the people, which is the origin of any power.
Art. 9 & 10: The people exercises its constitutional sovereignty through their representatives elected by them in the congresses, until the culmination of SADR's sovereignty over all national territory.
Art. 11: The people elect their institutions to preserve their identity and values, defend national unity and independence, and guarantee respect to the human rights as the ones defined in the constitution.
Art. 12: The people's institutions belong to the people. They can only be used for the objectives they were created for.

- 3rd Chapter: State

Art. 13: The state takes its legitimacy from the people's will, and only serves the people.
Art. 14: The state exercise its sovereignty over its territory, its territorial waters and its airspace.
Art. 15: It is forbidden to abandon or cede any part of the national territory.
Art. 16: The national territory is divided in wilayat (provinces) and dawair (Towns), subdivided in baladiat (districts). Its political attributions are defined by law.
Art. 17: The public goods are property of the people. They are composed of the mineral riches, the energetic resources, the territorial waters riches and other goods defined by law.
Art. 18: The public goods of the state are defined and administered in conformity with the law.
Art. 19: State function cannot be a source of enrichment, neither a mean to serve private interests or interests of a group based in regionalism, nepotism or tribalism.
Art. 20: The elected councils are the framework in which the people express its will and controls the public services.
Art. 21: The state is the responsible of public order and security of peoples and goods.
Art. 22: The Sahrawi People's Liberation Army (SPLA) is the armed forces of the state and guarantees national sovereignty.
Art. 23: The SPLA organization and the service in the army are defined by law.
Art. 24: SADR pursues in its foreign policy:

- Defend the inalienable right to self-determination of the Sahrawi people, and the culmination of national sovereignty over all national territory,
- Support the right of the people's to political and economical self-determination,
- Contribute to the construction of the Great Maghreb,
- Back the OUA in its efforts to consolidate political stability in Africa and implementation of economic complementarity between its member states.
- Setting up international peace and security and contribute to economic and social development of the peoples of the world, from the base of justice and equity.

- 4th Chapter: Rights and constitutional guarantees

Art. 25: All the citizens are equal before the law, both for protection or sanction.
Art. 26: Individual freedom is guaranteed. No one can be deprived of the exercise of its liberty, except by law. Every citizen is innocent until its culpability is confirmed.
Art. 27: It is prohibited to violate the privacy of the man, to act against his honor or exercising over him any physical or moral violence, or any attack on their dignity. The residence of any citizen is inviolable. The access will require an order from the competent judicial authority.
Art. 28: All citizens should be able to defend their rights before the competent judicial authorities.
Art. 29: Freedom of oral and written expression is guaranteed and exercised under the law.
Art. 30: The right to form associations and political parties is recognized and guaranteed after achieving full sovereignty over the territory.
Art. 31: Until the completion of national sovereignty, the Polisario Front remains the policy framework that brings together and mobilizes the Sahrawis, to express their aspirations and their legitimate right to self-determination and independence and to defend its national unity and improve the building of the Sahrawi sovereign state.
Art. 32: Any citizen who meets the required legal conditions have the right to elect and be elected.
Art. 33: All citizens have the right to stand as a candidate for public office according to the criteria defined by law.
Art. 34: Private property is guaranteed and organized by law.
Art. 35: The right to education is guaranteed. Education is compulsory and free. The state organizes the educational institutions in accordance with the academic laws.
Art. 36: All citizens are entitled to protection and health care.
Art. 37: Work is a right, duty and honor for all citizens.
Art. 38: State guarantees the protection of mothers, children, the elderly and the disabled, establish institutions for that purpose, adopting a social security policy and enacting the necessary laws.
Art. 39: The state shall promote housing for all citizens.
Art. 40: The state guarantees parents (father and mother) of martyrs, their children who have not attained the age of majority, the war wounded, the prisoners in enemy territory and the victims of the war of liberation the material and moral rights to be defined by law.
Art. 41: The state pursues the promotion of women and her political, social and cultural participation, in the construction of society and the country's development.
Art. 42: The state ensures the continuous improvement of the capacities of the youth and their better use.
Art. 43: Foreigners residing in the territory of the SADR have the right to practice their religion and exercise their habits and customs.
Art. 44: The state guarantees the rights and private property of foreigners living legally in the country.
Art. 45: Following the completion of national sovereignty, market economy and freedom of initiative will be recognized.
Art. 46: Foreign investment and public and private investments are organized by law.

- 5th Chapter: Liabilities

Art. 47: All the citizens are required to respect the Constitution and the laws of the republic. Ignorance of the law does not justify its infringement.
Art. 48: There is a sacred obligation for all: Defend the homeland and participate in its liberation, defend the national unity and combat any fickleness of belonging to the Sahrawi people. The law provides severe penalties for treason, espionage on behalf of the enemy, fidelity to the enemy and crimes committed against the state security.
Art. 49: National service is obligatory, all citizens who meet the legal conditions required for that purpose, are required to comply.
Art. 50: Protection of the family and its promotion is mandatory, for the parents in the education of their children, and for the children in the respect to their parents.

== See also ==
- History of Western Sahara
- Politics of Western Sahara
