= Politics of Western Sahara =

The politics of Western Sahara take place in a framework of an area claimed by both the partially recognized Sahrawi Arab Democratic Republic and the Kingdom of Morocco.

Occupied by Spain from 1884 to 1975, as Spanish Sahara, the territory has been listed with the United Nations as a case of incomplete decolonization since the 1960s, making it the last major territory to effectively remain a colony, according to the UN. The conflict is largely between the Kingdom of Morocco and the national liberation movement known as Polisario Front (Popular Front for the Liberation of the Saguia el-Hamra and Río de Oro), which in February 1976 formally proclaimed the Sahrawi Arab Democratic Republic (SADR), now basically administered by a government in exile in Tindouf, Algeria.

Following to the Madrid Accords, the territory was partitioned between Morocco and Mauritania in November 1975, with Morocco acquiring the northern two-thirds. Mauritania, under pressure from the POLISARIO guerrillas, abandoned all claims to its portion in August 1979, with Morocco moving to annex that sector shortly thereafter and has since asserted administrative control over the majority of the territory. A portion is administered by the SADR. The Sahrawi Arab Democratic Republic was seated as a member of the Organisation of African Unity in 1984, and was a founding member of the African Union. Guerrilla activities continued until a United Nations-monitored cease-fire was implemented September 6, 1991 via the mission MINURSO. The mission patrols the separation line between the two territories.

== Baker plan ==
The Baker Plan (formally, Peace Plan for Self-Determination of the People of Western Sahara) is a United Nations initiative to grant self-determination to Western Sahara. It was intended to replace the Settlement Plan of 1991, which was further detailed in the Houston Agreement of 1997.

The first draft of the plan, called Baker I or the Framework Agreement, was circulated by the UN special envoy James Baker in 2000, but never presented formally to the Security Council. Although based on Baker's proposals, it was drafted by a Morocco-sponsored legal team. It offered the people of Western Sahara autonomy within the Moroccan state. Except for defense and foreign policy, all other decisions would be the responsibility of local government. Morocco accepted the plan, but the Polisario rejected it.

The second version, informally known as Baker II, envisioned Saharan self-rule under a Western Sahara Authority for a period of five years, with a referendum on independence to follow. In this referendum, the entire present-day population of Western Sahara would participate, including people who had migrated from or been settled by Morocco post-1975, something which Polisario had so far refused. On the other hand, a provision that the interim local government (the Western Sahara Authority) would be elected only by a restricted voters' list (those identified as original inhabitants of the territory by MINURSO) alienated Morocco. After Morocco had voiced early objections to Baker II, the Polisario front reluctantly accepted the plan as a basis for negotiations. In July 2003, the UN Security Council endorsed the plan, something that it had not done with Baker's first draft, and unanimously called for the parties to implement it. Morocco, however, then rejected the plan, saying that it would no longer agree to any referendum that included independence as an option.

== Suffrage ==
The population under Moroccan control participates in countrywide and regional Moroccan elections. A referendum on independence or integration with Morocco was agreed upon by Morocco and the Polisario Front in 1991, but it has yet to take place.

The population under SADR control and in the Sahrawi refugee camps of Tindouf, Algeria, participates in elections to the Sahrawi Arab Democratic Republic.

== See also ==
- Political status of Western Sahara
- Legal status of Western Sahara
