= List of wars involving the Sahrawi Arab Democratic Republic =

Conflict	Combatant 1	Combatant 2	Results
Western Sahara War (1975–1991)	Sahrawi Arab Democratic Republic; Supported by: Algeria (1976, aid from 1976); Libya (1976–1984)	Morocco; Mauritania (1975–1979); Supported by: United States; France (1977–1978, aid from 1978); Saudi Arabia	Inconclusive: Spanish complete withdrawal under the Madrid Accords (1976); Mauritanian retreat and withdrawal of territorial claims and peace agreement with the Polisario Front.; Military stalemate; Ceasefire agreed on between the Polisario Front and Morocco (1991); Morocco controls approximately 70% of the territory, the Polisario Front controls 30%
Western Saharan clashes (2020–present) (2020–)	Sahrawi Arab Democratic Republic	Kingdom of Morocco	Ongoing: Morocco expands the berm in Guerguerat
