= General Union of Arab Students =

GUAS symbol

General Union of Arab Students (Arabic: الاتحاد العام للطلبة العرب) is a federation of student organizations in the Arab world. The headquarters of the organization are based in Damascus, Syria. The general secretary of GUAS is Nidal Ammar.
