= Khatri Addouh =

Sahrawi politician and diplomat

- خطري أدوه
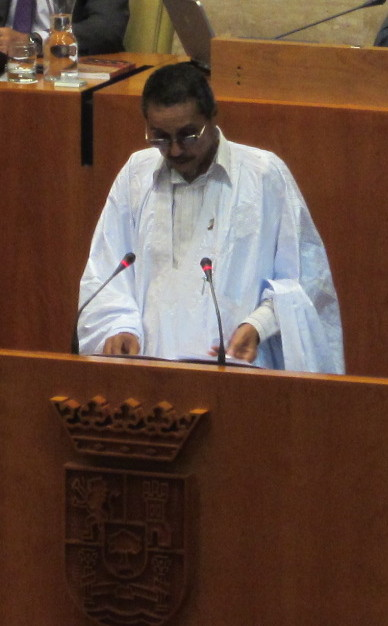
- Addouh in 2012

Sahrawi Ambassador to Algeria
- Incumbent
- Assumed office 26 May 2025
- President: Brahim Ghali
- Preceded by: Abdelkader Taleb Omar

Minister of Education and Vocational Training
- In office 14 February 2023 – 24 May 2025
- President: Brahim Ghali
- Succeeded by: Abdelkader Taleb Omar

President of the Sahrawi Arab Democratic Republic Interim
- In office 31 May 2016 – 12 July 2016
- Premier: Abdelkader Taleb Omar
- Preceded by: Mohamed Abdelaziz
- Succeeded by: Brahim Ghali

President of the Sahrawi National Council
- In office 10 July 2010 – 16 March 2020
- President: Mohamed Abdelaziz; Himself (Interim); Brahim Ghali
- Preceded by: Mahfoud Ali Beiba
- Succeeded by: Hamma Salama

Personal details
- Born: Smara, Spanish Sahara
- Party: Polisario Front

Khatri Addouh (Arabic: خطري أدوه; Spanish: Jatri Adduh), born 31 August 1954, is a Sahrawi politician and diplomat who currently serves as the ambassador of the Sahrawi Arab Democratic Republic to Algeria. He previously served as Minister of Education and Vocational Training from 2023 to 2025, and as president of the Sahrawi National Council from 2010 to 2020. Following the death of long-time president Mohamed Abdelaziz on 31 May 2016, Addouh was appointed interim president and the Secretary General of the Polisario Front.

== Career ==
Addouh is a member of the National Secretariat of the Polisario Front. He served in the Polisario Front Orientation Department. He also served as the Wali of Es Semara till August 2010. He became the President of the Sahrawi National Council on 10 July 2010. He replaced Mahfoud Ali Beiba, whose death was attributed by SADR to a heart attack, while Moroccan media claimed that Beiba was assassinated to make way for Addouh.

He was subsequently re-elected to the same post on 24 February 2014 and then again for a third term on 19 March 2016. Addouh became the acting president when Mohamed Abedlaziz, who was the president for 40 years since 1976 died on 31 May 2016. Addouh convened the 2300 strong delegate council at Dakhla, which elected Brahim Ghali as the new president of the Sahrawi Arab Democratic Republic.

Addouh also heads the negotiating team of the Polisario Front in various international organisations. Addouh and his loyalists are working towards gaining an observer status at the United Nations, which will enable the Polisario Front government to stake claim as the legitimate representative of the Sahrawi people.

In January 2022, Addouh met with Staffan de Mistura, the United Nations Secretary‑General's Personal Envoy for Western Sahara, at the resumption of peace talks.

Political offices
Preceded by Mohamed Abdelaziz	President of the Sahrawi Republic; Interim; 2016	Succeeded by Brahim Ghali
