= Sahrawi National Council =

Legislature

Sahrawi National Council المجلس الوطني الصحراوي Consejo Nacional Saharaui
- 12th Period

Type
- Type: Unicameral

History
- Founded: 1976
- Preceded by: Djema'a

Leadership
- President: Bashir Mustafa Sayed, Polisario Front since 28 March 2026
- Secretary-General: Saleh Ibrahim Saleh, Polisario Front since 28 March 2026

Structure
- Seats: 51 members
- Political groups: Government; Polisario Front (51)
- Committees: Six: Social and Economic Affairs; Foreign Affairs; Defense; Occupied Territories and Sahrawi Community Abroad; Information and Culture; Legal and Administrative Affairs

Elections
- Voting system: Single non-transferable vote
- Last election: 8–9 April 2023

Meeting place
- Sahrawi refugee camps or Tifariti

The Sahrawi National Council (SNC; Arabic: المجلس الوطني الصحراوي, romanized: al-Majlis al-Waṭanī aṣ-Ṣaḥrāwī, Spanish: Consejo Nacional Saharaui) is the legislature of the Sahrawi Arab Democratic Republic. Its structure and competences are guided by the Constitution of the Sahrawi Arab Democratic Republic (SADR). The present speaker since 2026 is Bashir Mustafa Sayed.

It was first created by Polisario Front members and Sahrawi tribal notables as the Provisionary National Council in April or November 1975, after the proclamation of Guelta Zemmur. On 27 February 1976, POLISARIO leader El-Ouali Mustapha Sayed announced that the Council had declared the creation of the Sahrawi Arab Democratic Republic, of which it became the first parliament. On the POLISARIO's III General Popular Congress (26–30 August 1976), a newly elected membership was formally installed as the Sahrawi National Council.

The SNC is a unicameral body, with 53 seats, elected every two years (since the XIII POLISARIO Congress) at the General Popular Congresses by delegates from the Sahrawi refugee camps at Tindouf province, Algeria, supplemented by representatives of the Sahrawi People's Liberation Army and the civil society organizations (UJSARIO, UNMS, UGTSARIO). In the last election (2012), 35% of the parliamentarians were women. It usually convenes in Tifariti, at the Liberated Territories of Western Sahara, but on occasion also in the refugee camps.

Among the reforms enacted by the SNC is the abolition of the death penalty. In 1999, the SNC caused the fall of then Prime Ministers Mahfoud Ali Beiba government through a motion of no-confidence. The powers of the SNC were substantially expanded in the 1991 constitutional reforms of the SADR, and has since been further enhanced.

== List of presidents of the Sahrawi National Council ==
Below is a list of presidents of the Sahrawi Provisional National Council:

Name	Image	Took office	Left office	Notes
Mohamed Ould Ziou		28 November 1975	August 1976	

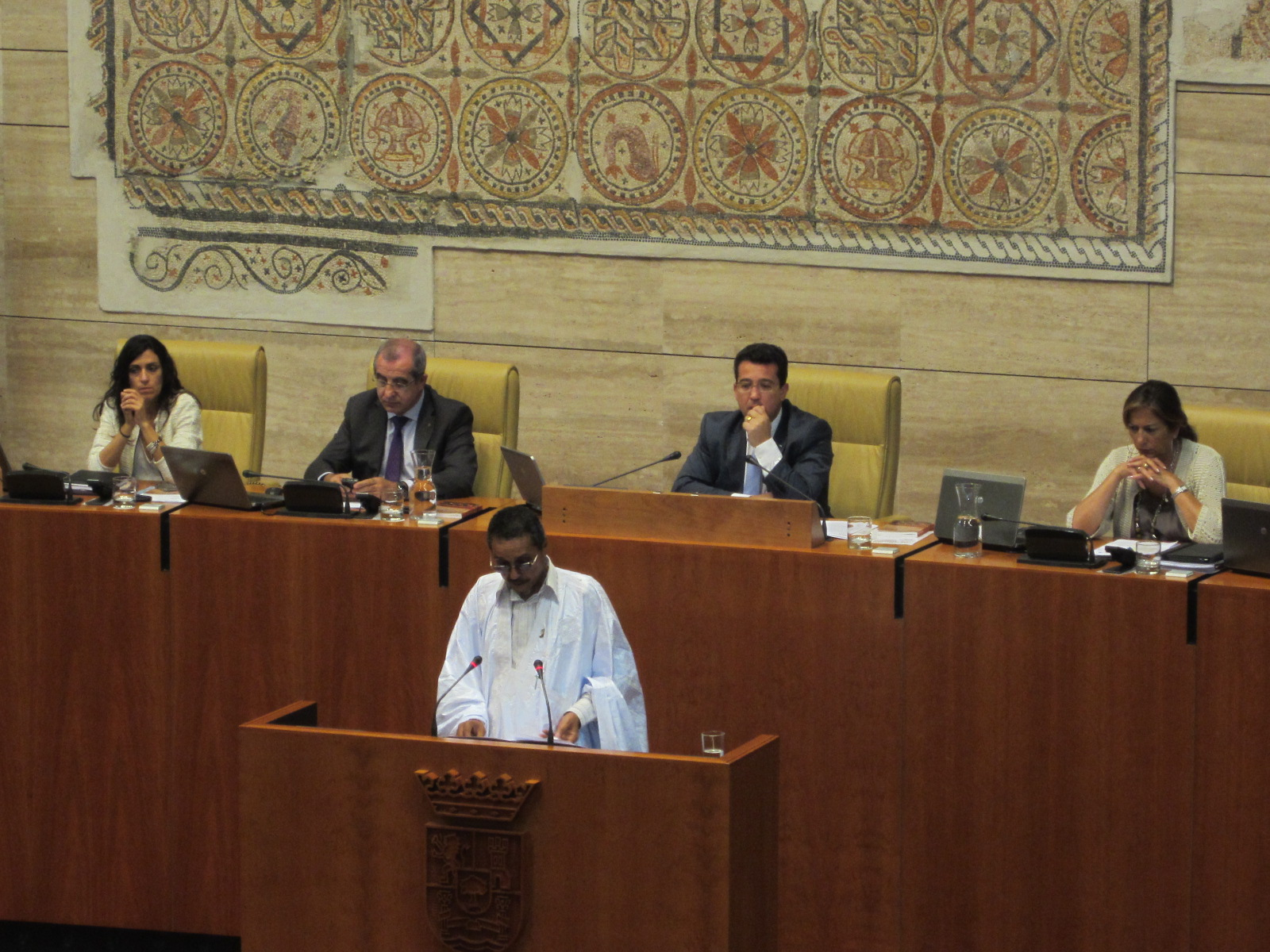
Khatri Addouh, president and speaker of the Sahrawi National Council, during a speech at the Asamblea de Extremadura, Spain, 26 July 2012.

Below is a list of presidents of the Sahrawi National Council:

Name	Image	Took office	Left office	Notes
Sidi Ahmed Ould Mohamed Mahmoud		August 1976	September 1978	
El-Kenti Ould Jouda		September 1978	1984	
Hamoudi Ould Ahmed Baba		? – 1985	1986	
Mohamed Ould Mubarek Ould Rahal		1986	1987 – ?	
Mohamed Lamine Ould Ahmed		?	?	
Abdelkader Taleb Omar		1995	1999	
Salem Lebsir		20 October 1999	2003	
Mahfoud Ali Beiba		2003	2 July 2010	
Mbarek Lehdeib		2 July 2010	10 July 2010	Acting
Khatri Addouh		10 July 2010	16 March 2020	
Hamma Salama		16 March 2020	28 March 2026	
Bashir Mustafa Sayed		28 March 2026	Present	

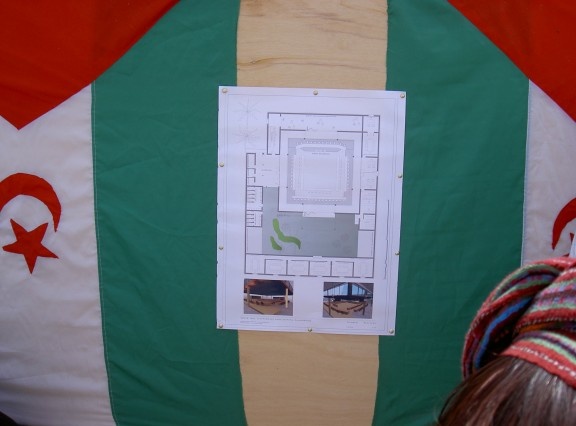
2005 drawing plan of the future building of the Sahrawi National Council in Tifariti, Liberated Territories.

Composition of the Sahrawi National Council
Party	Seats
Popular Front for the Liberation of Saguia el-Hamra and Río de Oro	53
Total	53

== International membership ==
The Sahrawi National Council is a member of the Pan-African Parliament. Since 14 October 2011, the SNC is a permanent observer member of the Andean Parliament.

== See also ==
- Politics of the Sahrawi Arab Democratic Republic
- List of legislatures by country
