= Sahrawi People's Liberation Army =

Land warfare branch of Western Sahara's military

- Spanish: Ejército de Liberación Popular Saharaui; Arabic: جيش التحرير الشعبي الصحراوي
- Flag of Sahrawi Arab Democratic Republic
- Founded: 10 May 1973 (53 years, 1 month ago)
- Headquarters: Tifariti

Leadership
- Commander in chief: President Brahim Ghali
- Chief of Staff: Hamma Salama

Personnel
- Military age: 18
- Conscription: No
- Active personnel: 20,000–30,000
- Reserve personnel: 50,000

Industry
- Foreign suppliers: Algeria; Libya (1976–1984)

Related articles
- History: List of wars involving the SADR; Western Sahara conflict
- Ranks: Military ranks of SADR

The Sahrawi (Note: also romanized as Saharawi) People's Liberation Army (SPLA; Arabic: جيش التحرير الشعبي الصحراوي, romanized: Jaysh al-Taḥrīr al-Shaʻbī al-Ṣaḥrāwī; Spanish: Ejército de Liberación Popular Saharaui, ELPS/ELP) is the army of the Sahrawi Arab Democratic Republic (SADR) and previously served as the armed wing of the Polisario Front prior to the foundation of the Republic. Its commander-in-chief was the Secretary-General of the Polisario, but the army is now also integrated into the SADR government through the SADR Minister of Defense. The SADR and the Polisario Front have no navy or air force. The SPLA's armed units are considered to have a manpower of possibly 20,000–30,000 active soldiers today, but during the war years its strength appears to have increased to 100,000 men. Both male and female refugees in the Tindouf camps undergo military training at age 18. Women formed auxiliary units protecting the camps during war years.

== Equipment ==
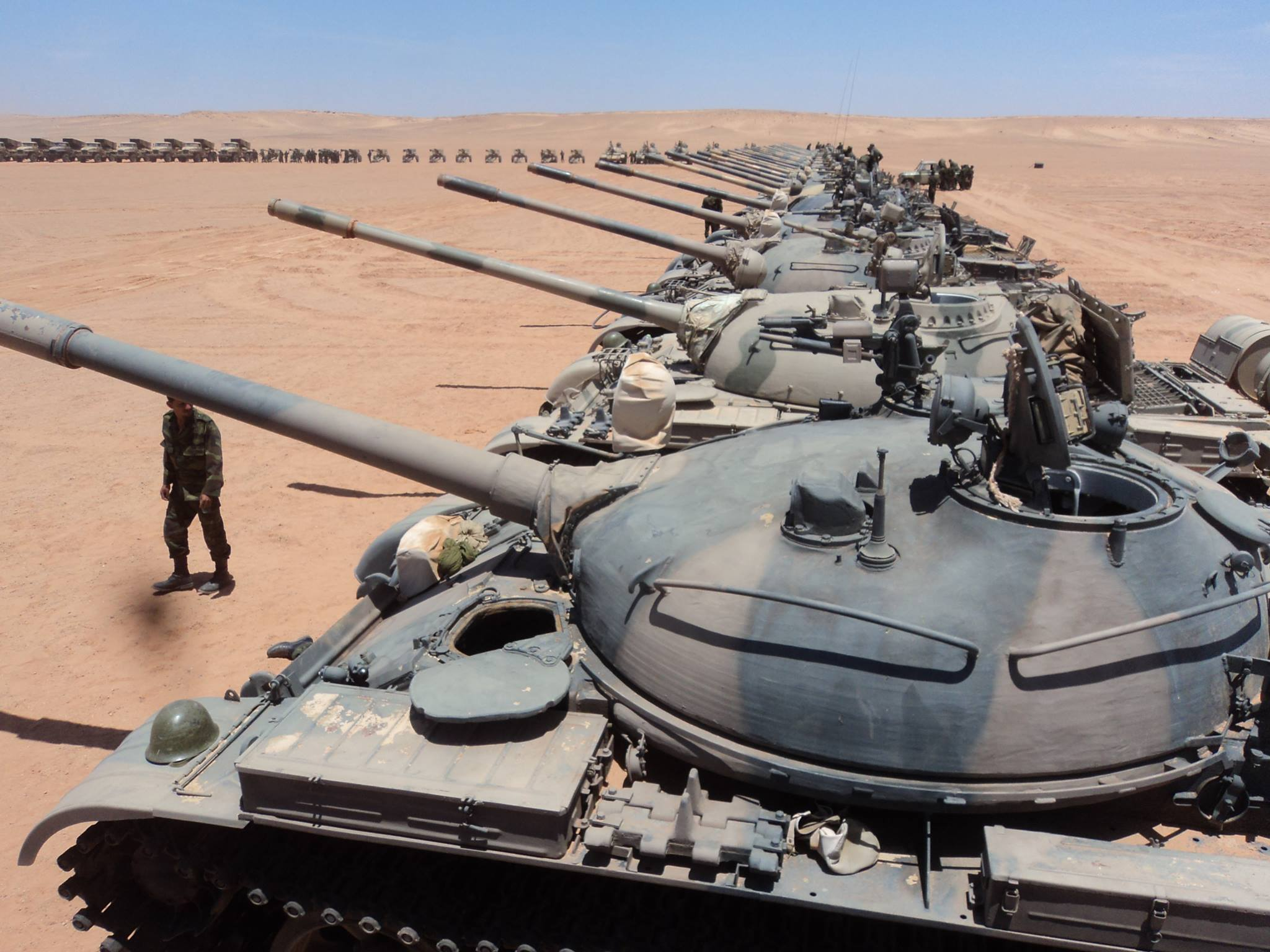
A Polisario tank division 2010.

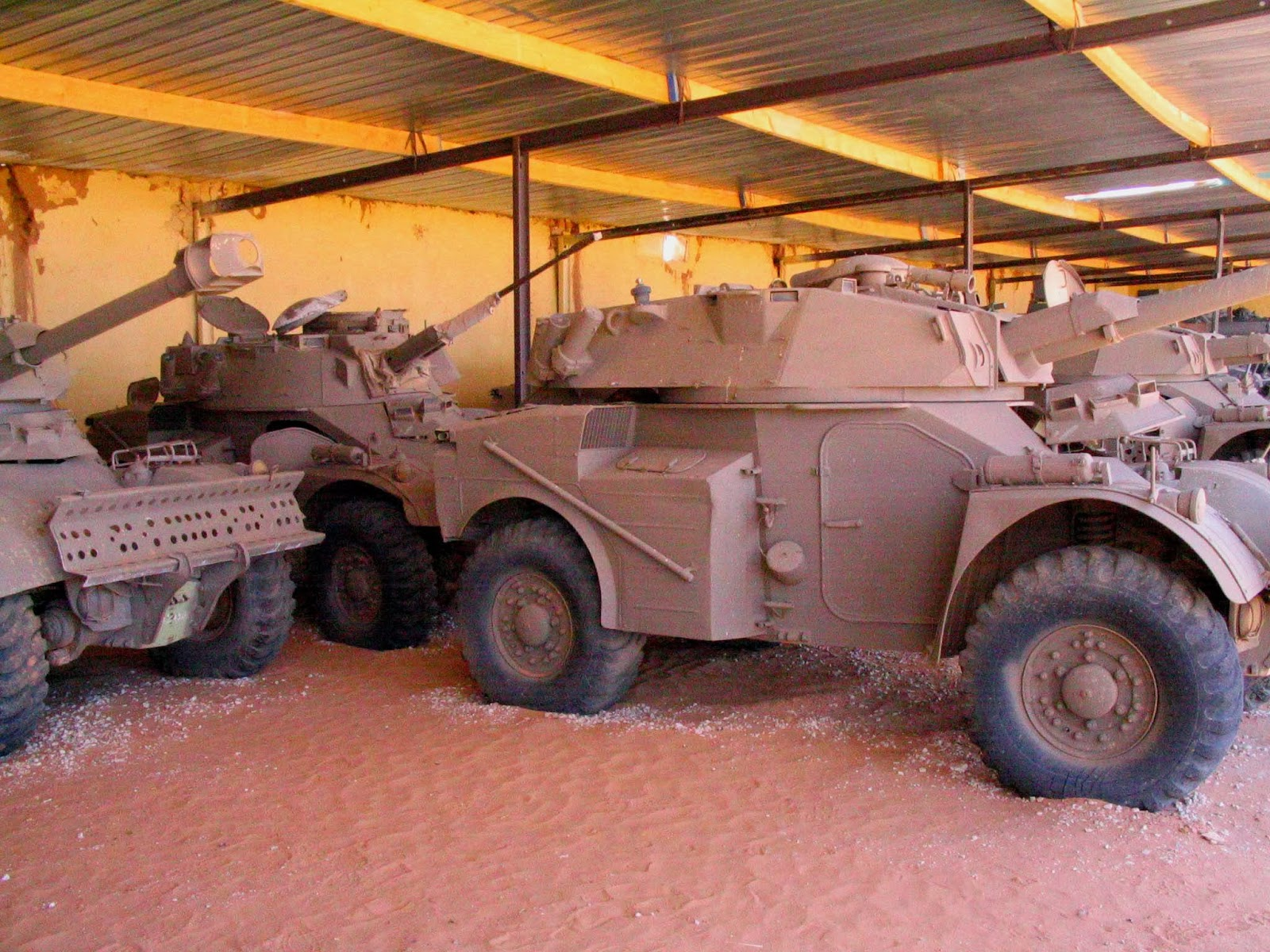
Captured Moroccan Eland armored cars in the Polisario Museum.

When it originally began the Anti-Spanish rebellion, Polisario was forced to capture its weapons individually, and transport them only by foot or camel. But the insurgents multiplied their arsenal and military sophistication after striking an alliance with Algeria in 1975. The modern SPLA is equipped mainly with now outdated Soviet-manufactured weaponry, donated by Algeria and in some cases by Libya. But its arsenals display a wide variety of material, some of it captured from Mauritanian (Panhard AMLs) or Moroccan forces (Eland Mk7s, Ratel IFVs, AMX-13s, SK-105 Kürassiers) and made in France, the United States, South Africa, Austria, or Britain. The SPLA has several armored units, composed of old tanks (T-55s, T-62s), somewhat more modern armored cars (EE-9 Cascavels, BRDM-2s), infantry fighting vehicles (BMP-1s, BTR-60s), rocket launchers (BM-21s, BM-30s) and halftracks. Surface-to-air missiles (anti-aircraft missiles, as SA-6s, SA-7s, SA-8s and SA-9s) have downed several Moroccan F-5 fighter jets, and helped compensate for the complete Moroccan control of the skies.

One of the most innovative tactics of the SPLA was its early and extensive use of Land Rovers and other re-modeled civilian vehicles as technicals, improvised fighting vehicles mounting anti-aircraft machine guns (as ZPU-2 or ZU-23) or anti-tank missiles, (as the AT-3 Sagger). The SPLA uses them in great numbers in order to overwhelm unprepared garrisoned outposts in rapid surprise strikes. This may reflect the movement's difficulties in obtaining original military equipment, but nonetheless proved a powerful tactic.

On 3 November 2005, the Polisario Front signed the Geneva Call, committing itself to a total ban on landmines, and later began to destroy its landmine stockpiles under international supervision. Morocco is one of 40 governments that have not signed the 1997 mine ban treaty. Both parties have used mines extensively in the conflict, but some mine-clearing operations have been carried out under MINURSO supervision since the ceasefire agreement.

Military equipment of the Sahrawi People's Liberation Army
Name	Country of origin	Quantity	Notes
Tanks
T-55A	/ Soviet Union	~70	(Received from Gaddafi Libya).
T-62 Obr. 1972	/ Soviet Union	~30	(Received from Gaddafi Libya).
Armoured fighting vehicles
EE-9	Military dictatorship in Brazil	~19	(Received from Gaddafi Libya in the early 1980s).
BRDM-2	Soviet Union	~12	(Received from Gaddafi Libya).
Infantry fighting vehicles
BMP-1	Soviet Union	~35	(Received from Gaddafi Libya).
Armoured personnel carriers
BTR-60PB	Soviet Union	~25	(Received from Gaddafi Libya).
Towed artillery
122mm D-30	Soviet Union	N/A	(Received from Gaddafi Libya).
Multiple rocket launchers
107mm Type-63	China	N/A	(Supplier uncertain; either Algeria or Gaddafi Libya).
122mm 9P132 Grad-P	Soviet Union	N/A	(Supplier uncertain; either Algeria or Gaddafi Libya).
122mm BM-21 'Grad'	Soviet Union	N/A	(Received from Gaddafi Libya).
122mm BM-11	North Korea	N/A	(Received from Gaddafi Libya in the early 1980s), (Not yet seen).
122mm RM-70	Czechoslovakia	N/A	(Received from Gaddafi Libya in the early 1980s), (Not yet seen).
Mortars
120mm M-43	Soviet Union	N/A	(Supplier uncertain; either Algeria or Gaddafi Libya).
160mm M-160	Soviet Union	N/A	(Supplier uncertain; either Algeria or Gaddafi Libya).
Anti-tank guided missiles
9M14 Malyutka	Soviet Union	N/A	(Supplier uncertain; either Algeria or Gaddafi Libya), (Not yet seen).
9M111 Fagot	Soviet Union	N/A	(Supplier uncertain; either Algeria or Gaddafi Libya), (Documented by a few sources, not yet seen).
Man-Portable Air Defence Systems
9K32 Strela-2	Soviet Union	N/A	(Received from Gaddafi Libya in the early 1980s).
(Self-propelled) anti-aircraft guns
14.5mm ZPU-2	Soviet Union	N/A	(Mounted on Toyota pickup trucks), (Supplier uncertain; either Algeria or Gaddafi Libya).
14.5mm ZPU-4	Soviet Union	N/A	(Mounted on Toyota pickup trucks), (Supplier uncertain; either Algeria or Gaddafi Libya).
23mm ZU-23	Soviet Union	N/A	(Mounted on Toyota pickup trucks), (Supplier uncertain; either Algeria or Gaddafi Libya).
23mm ZSU-23-4 'Shilka'	Soviet Union	N/A	(Supplier uncertain; either Algeria or Gaddafi Libya).
Surface-to-air missile systems
9K31 Strela-1	Soviet Union	~3	(Received from Gaddafi Libya in the early 1980s).
9K33 Osa	Soviet Union	~2	(Received from Gaddafi Libya in the early 1980s).
2K12 Kub	Soviet Union	~2	(Received from Gaddafi Libya in the early 1980s).
Radars
1S91 SURN	Soviet Union	N/A	(For 2K12 Kub), (Received from Gaddafi Libya in the early 1980s).
P-12	Soviet Union	N/A	(Received from Gaddafi Libya in the early 1980s) (Not yet seen).
PRV-16	Soviet Union	N/A	(Received from Gaddafi Libya in the early 1980s) (Not yet seen).

== Tactics ==
The SPLA traditionally employed ghazzi tactics, i.e., motorized surprise raids over great distances, which were inspired by the traditional camel-back war parties of the Sahrawi tribes.

However, after the construction of the Moroccan Wall this changed into tactics more resembling conventional warfare, with a focus on artillery, snipers and other long-range attacks. In both phases of the war, SPLA units relied on superior knowledge of the terrain, speed and surprise, and on the ability to retain experienced fighters.

== List of conflicts ==
The Sahrawi People's Liberation Army (SPLA), the armed wing of the Polisario Front and military of the Sahrawi Arab Democratic Republic, has been involved in the following wars and conflicts:

- Sahrawi Insurgency (1973–1976) – guerrilla war against Spanish rule in Spanish Sahara (Indecisive)
- Western Sahara War (1975–1991) – fought against both Morocco and Mauritania following Spain's withdrawal; after Mauritania withdrew in 1979, the war continued against Morocco until the 1991 ceasefire (Partly successful)
- Western Sahara Conflict (1973–present) – the broader ongoing conflict over Western Sahara, including political and military aspects. The SPLA is a principal party to this conflict (Ongoing)
- Second Western Sahara War (2020–present) – low-intensity warfare resumed after the Polisario Front declared the 1991 ceasefire void in November 2020 (Ongoing)

== Gallery ==
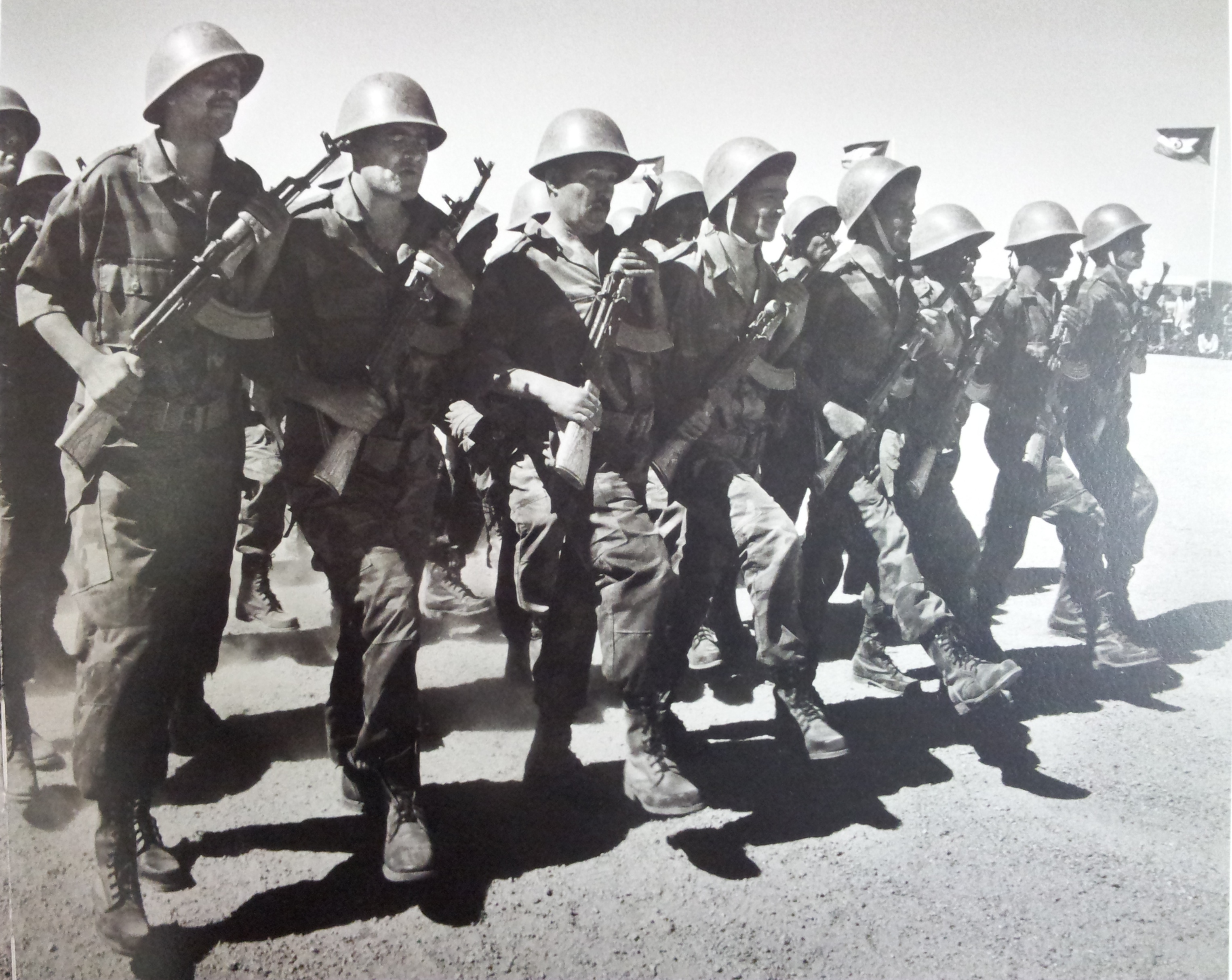
Military parade of the SPLA soldiers in 1980

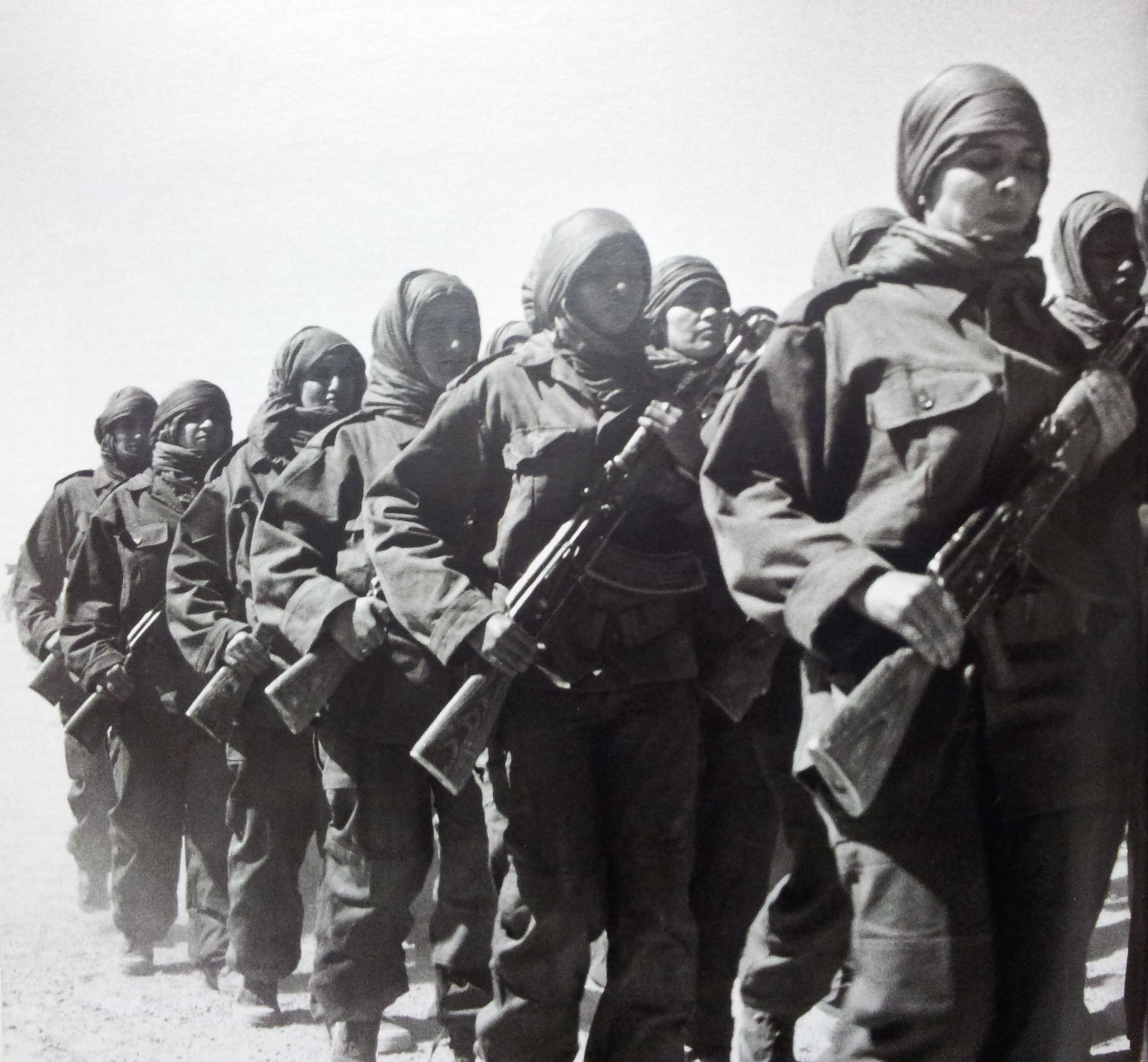
Female soldiers in 1980

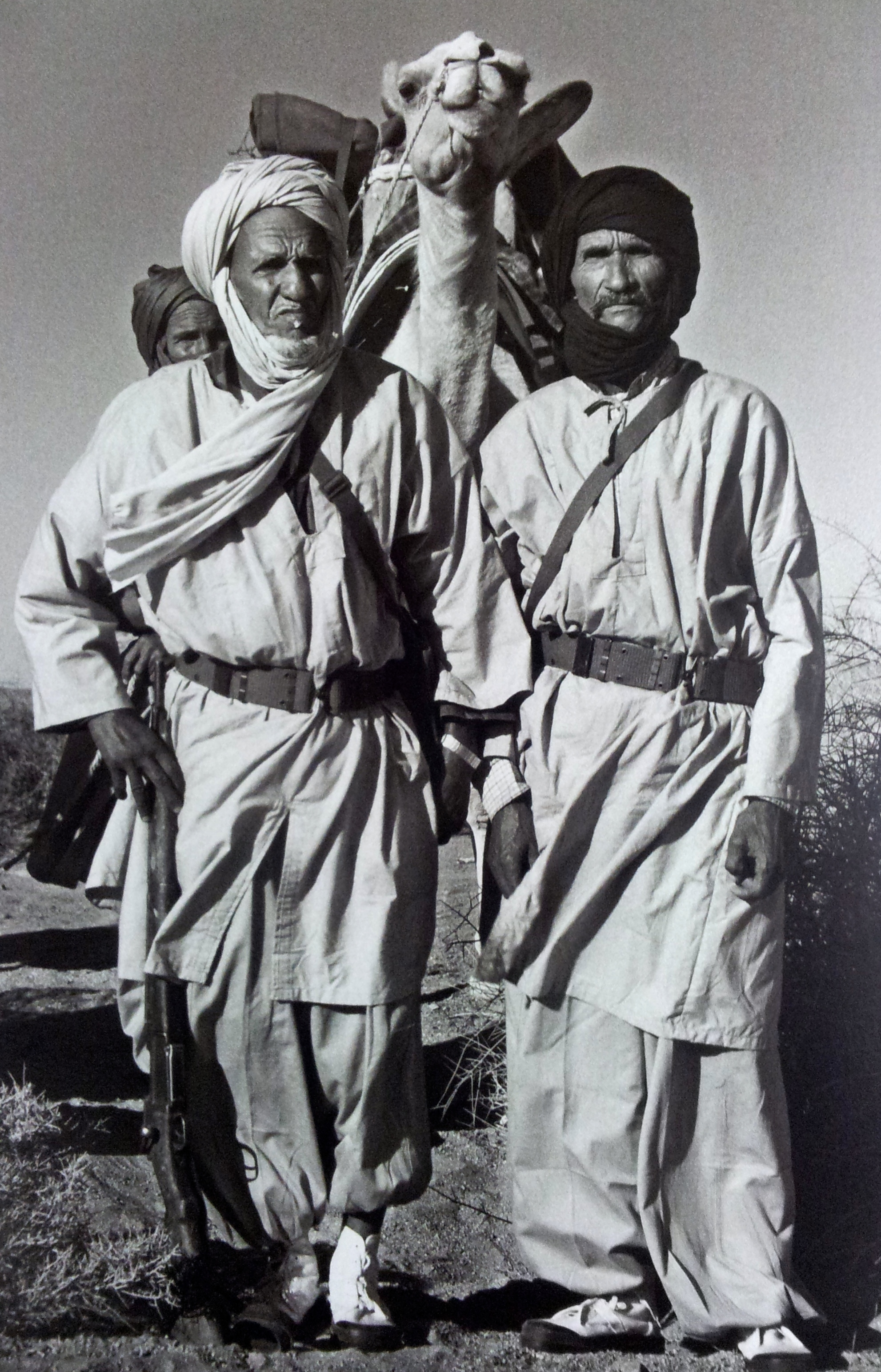
Sahrawi fighters, 1980

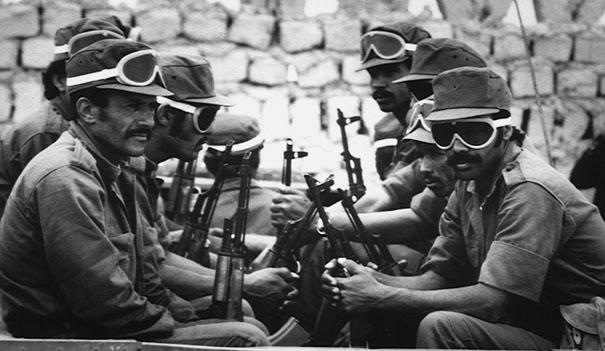
Male soldiers in 1985

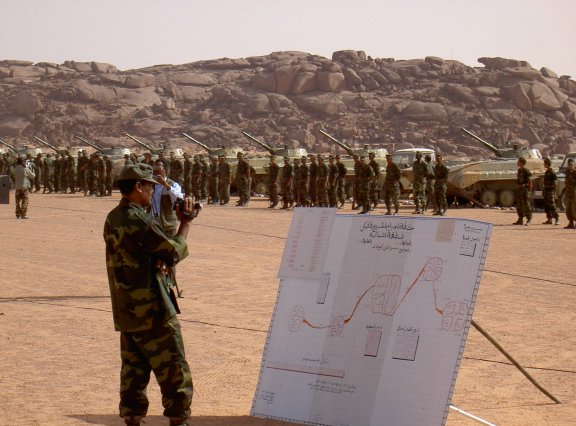
Army battalion in the Liberated Territories, 2005

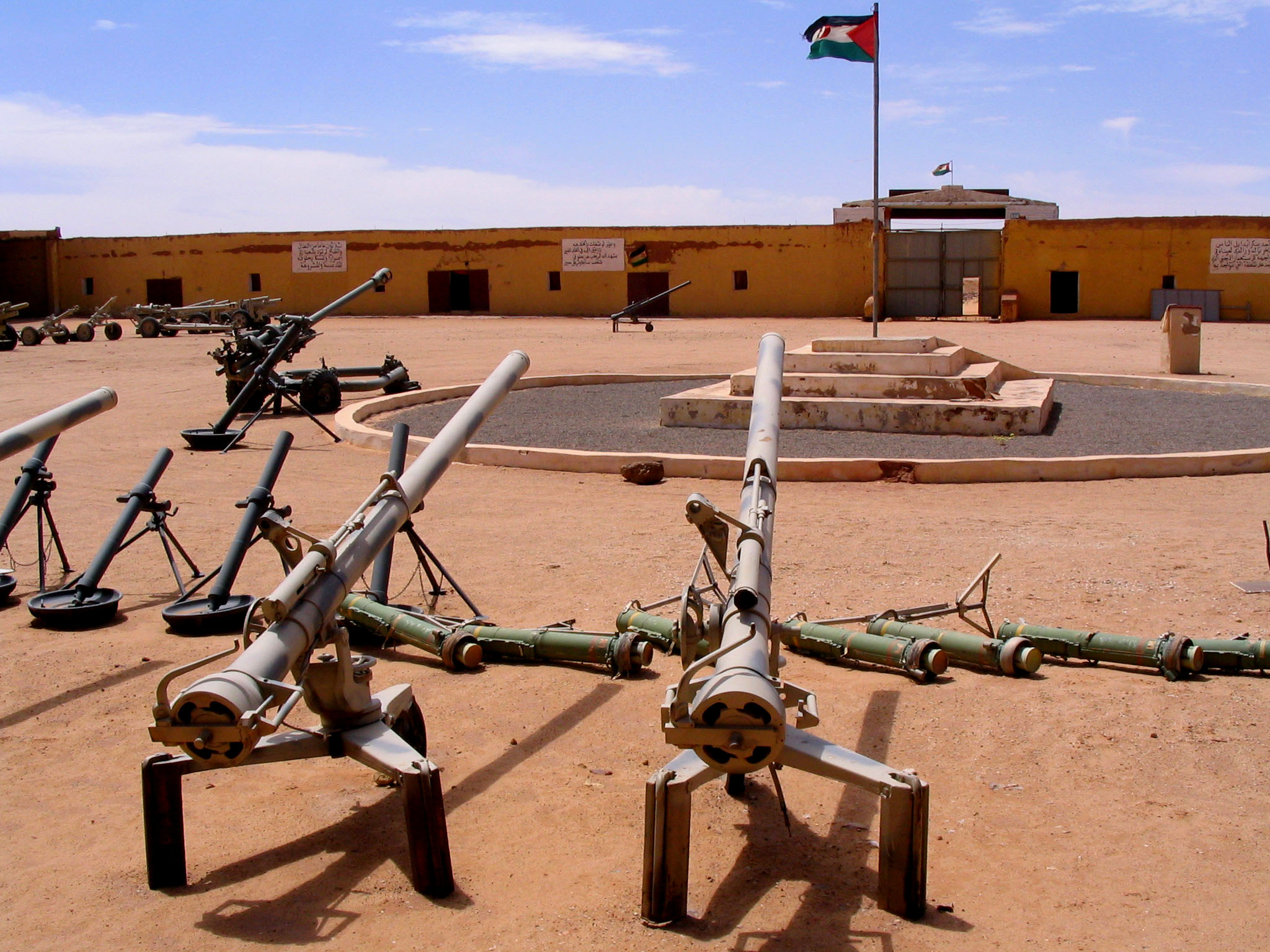
Army weapons parked at the Museum of the People's Liberation Army
