= Sahrawi Youth Union =

Algerian youth organization

Sahrawi Youth Union اتحاد شبيبة الساقية الحمراء ووادي الذهب
- Secretary General: Ali Mohamed Salem
- Founded: 1984; 42 years ago
- Headquarters: Sahrawi refugee camps
- Ideology: Sahrawi nationalism Arab nationalism Arab socialism Secularism; 1973–1991: Marxism
- Mother party: Polisario Front
- International affiliation: IUSY; WFDY; PI
- Website: www.ujsario.org

Sahrawi Youth Union (Spanish: Unión de la Juventud de Saguía el Hamra y Río de Oro; Arabic: اتحاد شبيبة الساقية الحمراء ووادي الذهب, romanized: Ittiḥād Shabībat al-Sāqiyah al-Ḥamrāʼ wa-Wādī al-Dhahab), also known by its Spanish acronym UJSARIO, is the youth organization of the Polisario Front.

== Organization ==
UJSARIO was founded in 1984 through the merger of Unión de Estudiantes Saharauis (Sahrawi Students' Union or UESARIO) and the Polisario Front Youth. It operates from the Sahrawi refugee camps in Tindouf, Algeria, organizing youth and students within the exile community, and promoting the interest of the youth within the POLISARIO and the Sahrawi republic.

The work of UJSARIO is divided in different national areas:

- Juvenile groups in the Wilayas, Institutions, Occupied territories and Europe.
- Union of Sahrawi Students (UESARIO).
- Organization and integration of the young women.
- Organization of scouts groups.
- Volunteer groups.

It has extensive international contacts with other youth political or cultural movements, especially in Spain, like the Spanish Youth Council or the Spanish Youth Organization. It is a full member of the Arab Youth Union, General Union of Arab Students, the World Federation of Democratic Youth, the International Falcon Movement - Socialist Educational International, the International Union of the Socialist Youth, the African Youth Union, the Pan African Youth Movement, the Youth for Development and Cooperation (YDC) and the Economic, Social and Cultural Council. It campaigns for a free Western Sahara, and tries to organize international youth exchanges and opportunities for refugee Sahrawis to study abroad.

From late 2005 to 31 December 2013 the General Secretary was Musa Salma. followed by Zain Sidahmed (2014 – 2017) and Mohamed Said Daddi (2017 – 2022). The current SG is Ali Mohamed Salem since May 2022. In April 2012, Teceber Ahmed Saleh, member of the UJSARIO delegation, was elected as one of the African vicepresidents of the IUSY Presidium for the 2012–2014 term, at the IUSY World Congress held in Asunción, Paraguay.

Since 2006, UJSARIO organizes jointly with not-for-profit organizations a "Religious Dialogue for Peace" forum in the refugee camps, with presence of imams, priests, bishops and professors from Algeria, Austria, Canada, Great Britain, South Africa, Spain, Turkey and the United States.

In May 2013, UJSARIO and the Ittihaida Youth (the Moroccan party Socialist Union of Popular Forces youth) presented a joint resolution in the framework of the International Union of Socialist Youth World Council defending a peaceful, just, permanent and mutually-accepted solution that enables the self-determination of Western Sahara. At the same time, both organizations supported the UN mission to organize a referendum in Western Sahara.

== Sections ==
Logo of the "Unión de Estudiantes de Saguia El-Hamra y Rio de Oro" (UESARIO) (in English: Sahrawi Students' Union), an UJSARIO section with branches in Algeria, Cuba, Italy, Libya and Spain.

Logo of "Nosotros Somos Capaces", an UJSARIO section founded in the Sahrawi refugee camps in 2013 for the handicapped.

== See also ==
- National Organization of Sahrawi Women
- Sahrawi Trade Union
