= President of the Sahrawi Arab Democratic Republic =

Head of state

- رئيس الجمهورية العربية الصحراوية الديمقراطية (Arabic); Presidente de la República Árabe Saharaui Democrática (Spanish)
- Coat of arms of the Sahrawi Arab Democratic Republic

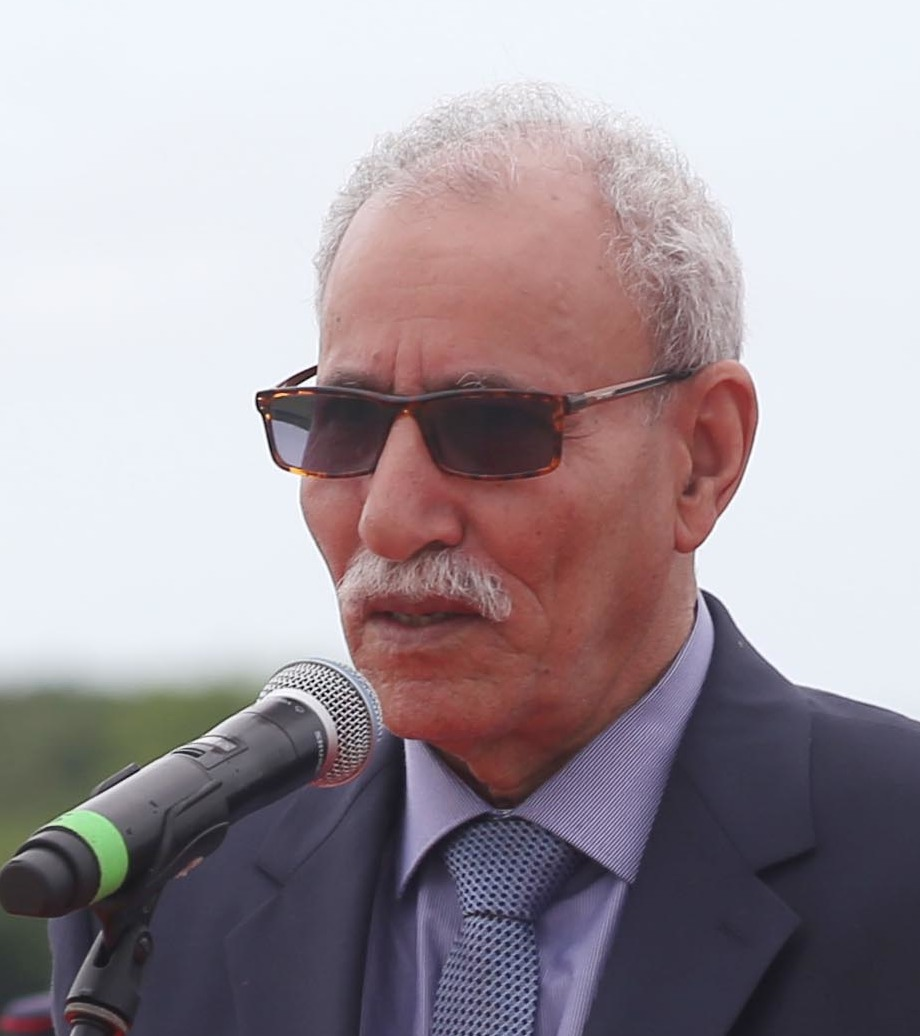
- Incumbent; Brahim Ghali since 12 July 2016
- Type: Head of state Commander-in-chief
- Residence: Sahrawi refugee camps, Tindouf, Algeria
- Term length: No term limit
- Inaugural holder: Mohamed Abdelaziz
- Formation: August 1982; 44 years ago

The president of the Sahrawi Arab Democratic Republic is the head of state of the partially recognised Sahrawi Arab Democratic Republic (SADR), a government in exile based in the Sahrawi refugee camps of Tindouf, Algeria.

From the declaration of independence on 27 February 1976, to August 1982, the head of state of the SADR was known as the chairman of the Revolutionary Council. The office of the president of the SADR was established in August 1982, after a change in the constitution made by the fifth general congress of the Polisario Front, where it was decided the post were to be held by the Secretary-General of the Polisario. The first President was Mohamed Abdelaziz from August 1982 until his death in 2016.

The powers of the presidency are extensive, and they have been subject to modification in various constitutional amendments, the last occurring in 1995.

== Chairmen/Presidents of the Sahrawi Arab Democratic Republic (1976–present) ==
No.	Portrait	Chairman/President	Took office	Left office	Time in office	Party	Ref.
1	El-Ouali Mustapha Sayed	El-Ouali Mustapha Sayed (1948–1976) † (Note: Died in combat in Mauritania.)	29 February 1976	9 June 1976 †	101 days	Polisario	—
–	Mahfoud Ali Beiba	Mahfoud Ali Beiba (1953–2010); Acting	9 June 1976	30 August 1976	82 days	Polisario	—
2	Mohamed Abdelaziz	Mohamed Abdelaziz (1947–2016)	30 August 1976	31 May 2016 †	39 years, 275 days	Polisario	—
–	Khatri Addouh	Khatri Addouh (born 1954); Acting	31 May 2016	12 July 2016	42 days	Polisario	
3	Brahim Ghali	Brahim Ghali (born 1949)	12 July 2016	Incumbent	10 years, 57 days	Polisario	—

== See also ==
- History of Western Sahara
- List of colonial governors of Spanish Sahara
- Prime Minister of the Sahrawi Arab Democratic Republic
