= Sahrawi Trade Union =

Algerian labor organization

Sahrawi Trade Union الاتحاد العام لعمال الساقية الحمراء ووادي الذهب Unión General de Trabajadores de Saguia el Hamra y Río de Oro
- Formation: 1973
- Type: Trade union
- Headquarters: Sahrawi refugee camps
- Location: Tindouf, Algeria
- Official language: Hassaniya, Spanish
- Secretary General: Salama Bachir

Sahrawi Trade Union, also known as UGTSARIO, (Spanish abbreviation for Union General de Trabajadores de Saguia el Hamra y Río de Oro) is the labor organization of the Polisario Front.

== Organization ==
While started to work in 1973 (before the Spanish withdrawal from Western Sahara), its official foundation was in 1975. Initially an important part of POLISARIO, as much of the Sahrawis who joined the movement in the first years were Fos Bucraa workers, its importance has diminished as a result of the mass exodus of Sahrawis, mostly in the 1975-76 period, at the beginning of the Western Sahara War.

There is little need for a labor union in the refugee camps of Tindouf, Algeria, where unemployment is near total, and what work exists is organized by the camp administration. The movement therefore appears largely dormant in its labor union role until an independent Western Sahara would provide it with a normally functioning labor market again.

It remains a part of the POLISARIO structure, though, and has internal representation at several levels. The general secretary (elected in the UGTSARIO congresses) is also member of the Polisario Front National Committee. The organization is directed by the Executive Bureau, which is composed of 9 members (6 from the Sahrawi refugee camps and 3 from the Occupied Territories, which identity is kept in secret for security reasons) elected in the congresses. It campaigns internationally to attract attention to the Sahrawi cause, and enjoys good relations with many European and African trade unions. It also has members in the Moroccan controlled parts of Western Sahara, although it is banned by the Moroccan authorities. The organization is divided in four branches, as for example the UPES, Union de Periodistas y Escritores Saharauis ("Sahrawi Journalists and Writers Union") or the UJS, Union de Juristas Saharauis ("Sahrawi Jurists Union").

UGTSARIO is member of the World Federation of Trade Unions (WFTU) and the Organization of African Trade Union Unity (OATUU). It also has observer status in the International Trade Union Confederation (ITUC).

Its present general secretary is Mohamed Cheikh Lehbib.

== Congresses ==
- 1st Congress: (October 20, 1975)
- 2nd Congress:
- 3rd Congress: (March 30, 1996)
- 4th Congress: (February 24–26, 2000)
- 5th Congress: Martyr Lamin Mohamed Chaibine (May 19–21, 2004)
- 6th Congress: Martyr Ouleida Mohamed Ali (October 20–22, 2008)
- 7th Congress: Martyr Said Sidahmed Dambar (October 21–23, 2012)

Since the 3rd Congress and in parallel to the UGTSARIO congress, there is an "International Trade Union Conference in Solidarity with the Western Saharan Workers". The last one issued a Declaration in solidarity with the Sahrawi people who have been disappeared, tortured or detained by the Moroccan government, against the exploitation of the natural resources by multinational companies, rejecting the preferential status given to Morocco by the EU and supporting the Sahrawi refugees. The declaration was signed by several trade unions as CCOO, UGT, USO, CIG, ELA (Spain), UGTA (Algeria), CGIL (Italy), CGTP (Portugal), COSATU (South Africa), NLC (Nigeria), COC (Mexico), FSM (Greece), AWU, ACTU (Australia).

== Sections ==
Logo of the "Unión de Periodistas y Escritores Saharauis" (UPES) (in English: Sahrawi Journalists and Writers Union), an UGTSARIO branch founded in 1980.

== See also ==
- National Organization of Sahrawi Women
- Sahrawi Youth Union
