= National Union of Sahrawi Women =

Organization

National Organization of Sahrawi Women الاتحاد الوطني للمرأة الصحراوية Unión Nacional de Mujeres Saharauis
- Formation: 1974
- Type: Network for Sahrawi refugee women
- Headquarters: Sahrawi refugee camps
- Location: Tindouf, Algeria
- Official language: Hassaniya, Spanish
- General Secretary: Fatma Mehdi
- Website: mujeressaharauisunms.org

The National Union of Sahrawi Women (Arabic: الاتحاد الوطني للمرأة الصحراوية; Spanish: Unión Nacional de Mujeres Saharauis, UNMS) is the women's wing of the Polisario Front. It was created in 1974, and claims to have 10,000 members, divided between the Sahrawi refugee camps, the Liberated territories, the Moroccan-occupied part of Western Sahara and the Sahrawi diaspora (including for instance Spain, Mauritania or France).

== Organization ==
The organization is mostly active in the Sahrawi refugee camps in Tindouf, Algeria, where it is a powerful force within the POLISARIO and the Sahrawi republic. It is internationally active in organizing support for Sahrawi women and the Sahrawi cause, but also campaigns for women's rights within the exile community and in political decision-making. As a consequence of this, and of the special circumstances of the Western Sahara war years, the situation of Sahrawi women has improved noticeably. There are presently two women in the Sahrawi republic's government, the Minister of Culture Khadijah Hamdi, and the Minister of Education Mariem Salek Hamada.

The UNMS is directed by a "National Committee" of 66 members, elected in the UNMS congress every 5 years. It is subdivided into several departments:

- Department of External Relations and Cooperation
- Department of Information and Culture
- Department of Administration and Organization
- Department of Occupied Towns and Emigration
- Department of Social Affairs
- Department of Health and Family Affairs
- Department of Formation
- Department of Education
- Department of Production

There are also departments for each Wilaya. The national committee is chaired by a Secretary General, elected also in the congresses, who is at the same time member of the Polisario Front national committee.

Keltoum Khayati, a former secretary general of the UNMS, fled to Morocco and is defending the Moroccan position in the conflict. Fatma Mehdi Hassan has been secretary general since 2002.

The UNMS has been a member of the Women's International Democratic Federation (WIDF) and the General Federation of Arab Women since 1977 and of the Pan-African Women's Organization (PAWO) since 1980.

== Objectives ==
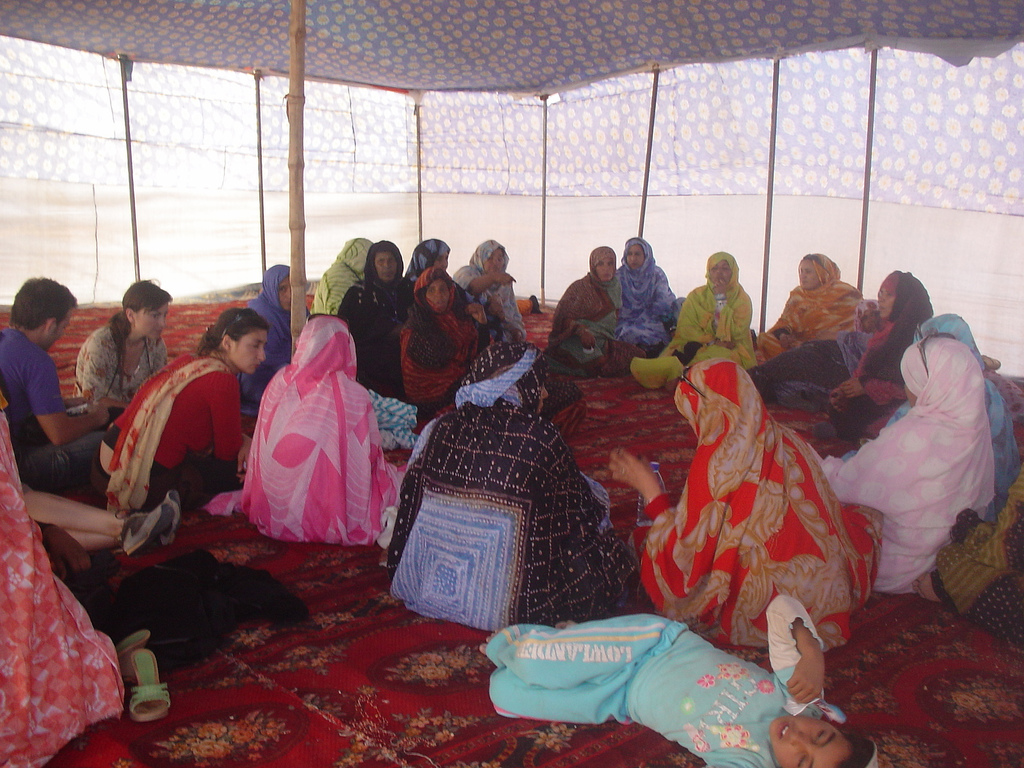
Sectorial workshop during the 5th Congress of the "National Union of Sahrawi Women", at the Sahrawi refugee camps (April 6, 2007).

On the national level, the UNMS objectives are:

- Sensitize Saharawi women about their role in the struggle for the liberation and independence of the Western Sahara.
- Orient women in the social and political fields to improve their level of education and training (literacy campaigns, scholastic and professional training, political seminars, etc.).
- Aware women about their social and political rights, to guarantee an effective participation in the present and in the future.
- Deepen in the role of the family, specially on educative level, guaranteeing an equal education between boys and girls, with the basis of respect and equality in society.
- Concern women about the importance of the prevention on the health field.
- Solidarity with our compatriots in the occupied zones, constantly facing the Moroccan aggression, being victims of discrimination and suffering.

On the international level, the UNMS objectives are:

- Implementation of decisions and strategies concerning women, particularly the "Strategy of Nairobi".
- Establishment of security and peace in the world, equality between the sexes as the basis for all progress and development and the reinforcement of human rights and democracy.
- Monitoring of the situation of the women worldwide, knowing that all work for the same objectives, despite the religious, political or social situation.
- Enhance the relations with as many women's organizations worldwide, with the aim of:
  - Broaden the base of coalition and solidarity with our people's struggle generally and our women particularly.
  - Achieve material and financial support for the UNMS projects for woman's formation in the refugee camps.
  - Denounce War and Racism, in which women and children used to be the first victims.
  - Denounce the violation of women rights.

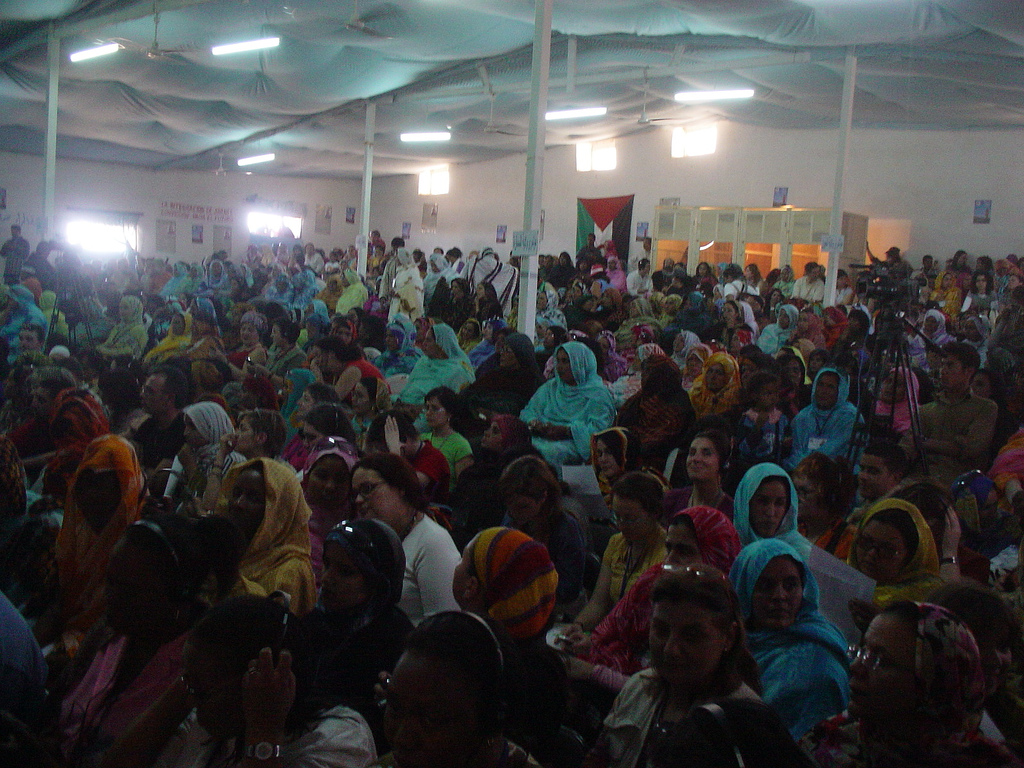
Opening session of the 5th Congress of the "National Union of Sahrawi Women", at the Sahrawi refugee camps (April 5, 2007).

== Congresses ==
- 1st Congress: "Martyr Jueta Hadda Laulad" (March 23–25, 1985).
- 2nd Congress: "Martyr Jnaza Ayad" (February 24–26, 1990).
- 3rd Congress: "Martyr Batul Sidi Sidali" (February 24–26, 1996).
- 4th Congress: "Martyr Fatimatu Ahmed-Salem Baad" (March 29–31, 2002)
- 5th Congress: "Martyr Maimuna Abdallahi Mohamed Lamin" (April 5–7, 2007)
- 6th Congress: "Sahrawi women perpetuating the Gdeim Izik spirit" (April 20–24, 2011)

== See also ==
- Sahrawi Youth Union
- Sahrawi Trade Union
