= Women in the Sahrawi Arab Democratic Republic =

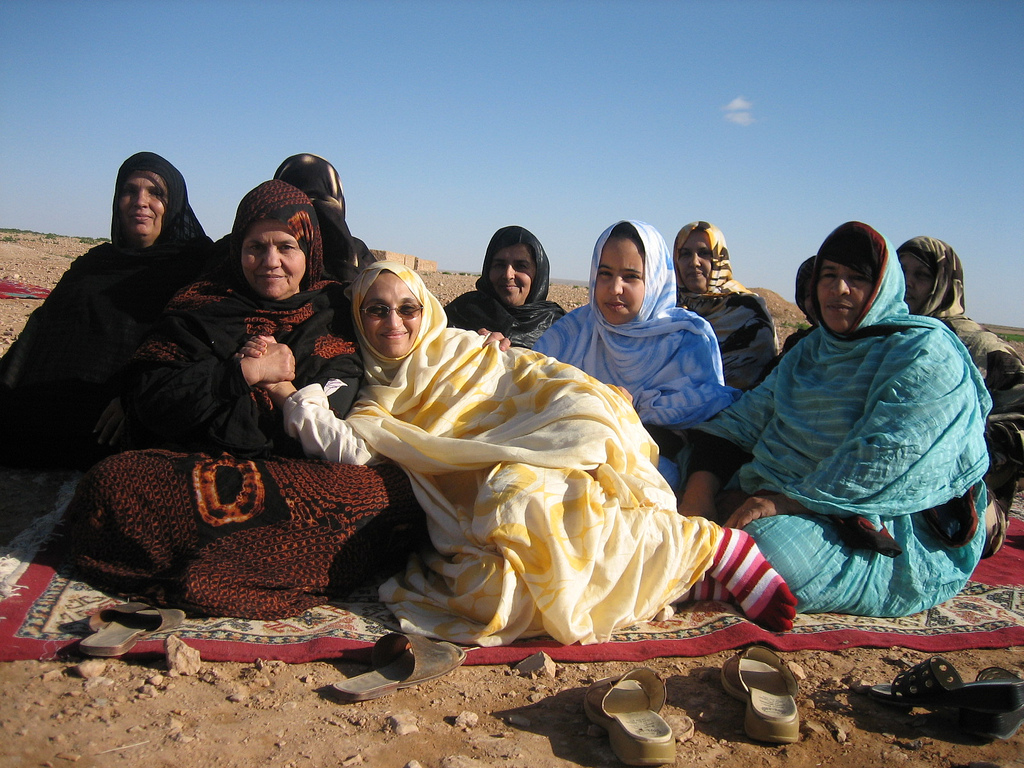
A group of Sahrawi women.

Women in the Sahrawi Arab Democratic Republic are women who were born in, who live in, or are from the Sahrawi Arab Democratic Republic (SADR, also romanized with Saharawi) in the region of the Western Sahara or the Sahrawi refugee camps. In Sahrawi society, the women share responsibilities at every level of its community and social organization. Article 41 of the Constitution of the Sahrawi Arab Democratic Republic ensures that the state will pursue "the promotion of women and [their] political, social and cultural participation, in the construction of society and the country's development".

== Clothing ==
Sahrawi women traditionally wear the melhfa (also spelled melfa, malhfa or milaḥfa) — a flowing, four-meter-long piece of fabric, usually cotton. The melhfa is wrapped around the body and head in a specific, customary manner: along the left-hand length to create an arm opening, while the remaining fabric is brought around the back, over the head, and wrapped across the right side, then over the left shoulder. This technique creates a graceful, loose drape that covers the body modestly while still revealing the face, front of the hair, arms, and feet. It has no sewn structure or fastening and can be adjusted for daily life, including covering the face from sun as well as tying it shorter, especially for house works.

The melhfa is more than just clothing: it is a form of identity, elegance, and political expression. The colors and patterns are often subject to trends, influenced by social, generational, or seasonal preferences. While everyday melhfas may be light and practical, those worn during ceremonies or protests are often more vibrant or symbolic.

Traditional melhfas are called nila and made from ultra-thin, sheer muslin dyed with indigo. The dye gives the fabric its signature shimmer and may stain the skin, which is considered a form of sun protection.

== Role in refugee camps ==
The Polisario Front, a national liberation movement that is recognized by the United Nations as the representative of the people of Western Sahara since 1979, has attempted to modernize the society of the Sahrawi refugee camps that was set up in Tindouf Province, Algeria from 1975 to 1976, through emphasis on education, eradication of tribalism and emancipation of women. The role of Sahrawi women was central already in pre-colonial and colonial life, but was strengthened further during the war years (1975–1991), when Sahrawi women ran most of the camps' administration, while the men were fighting at the front. This together with literacy- and professional education classes produced major advances in the role of women in Sahrawi society. The return of large numbers of Sahrawi men since the cease fire in 1991 may have slowed this development according to some observers, but women still run a majority of the camps' administration, and the Sahrawi women's union UNMS is very active in promoting their role. The role of women in camps was enhanced by their shouldering of the main responsibility for the camps and government bureaucracy during the war years, as virtually the entire male population was enrolled in the Polisario army.

== Politics ==
In the 2012 election for seats in the Sahrawi National Council, 35% of the parliamentarians were women. In the legislative election in 2008 women gained 34.61% of seats, thanks in part to a quota system.

== Cultural life ==
In Sahrawi culture, the role of the poet is not gendered and both men and women are recognised as accomplished poets. Poets such as Al Khadra and Hadjatu Aliat Swelm compose works inspired by the Sahrawi struggle, as well as life in Sahrawi camps. Women are the only ones in Hassani poetry (the tradition Sahrawi poetry is part of) to compose the tabr'a genre.

In musical life, women traditionally play the ardin (plural irdiwen), which is a small lap harp with between nine and fourteen strings.

== Notable Sahrawi Women ==
- Tekber Ahmed Saleh – political and social activist, member of the Sahrawi National Council
- Teslem Andala Ubbi – MP in the Congress of Deputies
- Hadjatu Aliat Swelm – poet
- Aziza Brahim – singer, actress
- Jira Bulahi Bad – representative of the Polisario Front in Spain
- Elghalia Djimi – human rights activist
- Fatma El-Mehdi – secretary-general of the National Union of Sahrawi Women
- Khadijetou El Mokhtar – politician, diplomat
- Nazha El-Khalidi – journalist, human rights activist
- Aminatou Haidar – human rights activist dubbed the “Sahrawi Gandhi”
- Ebbaba Hameida Hafed – journalist, women's rights activist
- Mariem Hassan – singer and lyricist
- Sultana Khaya – human rights activist
- Najla Mohamed-Lamin – women's rights and climate-change activist
- Nadhira Mohamed – activist and actress

== See also ==
- National Union of Sahrawi Women (NUSW)
- Polisario Front
- Sahrawi refugee camps
