= Dakhla (refugee camp) =

Dakhla refugee camp مخيم الداخلة
- Refugee Camp
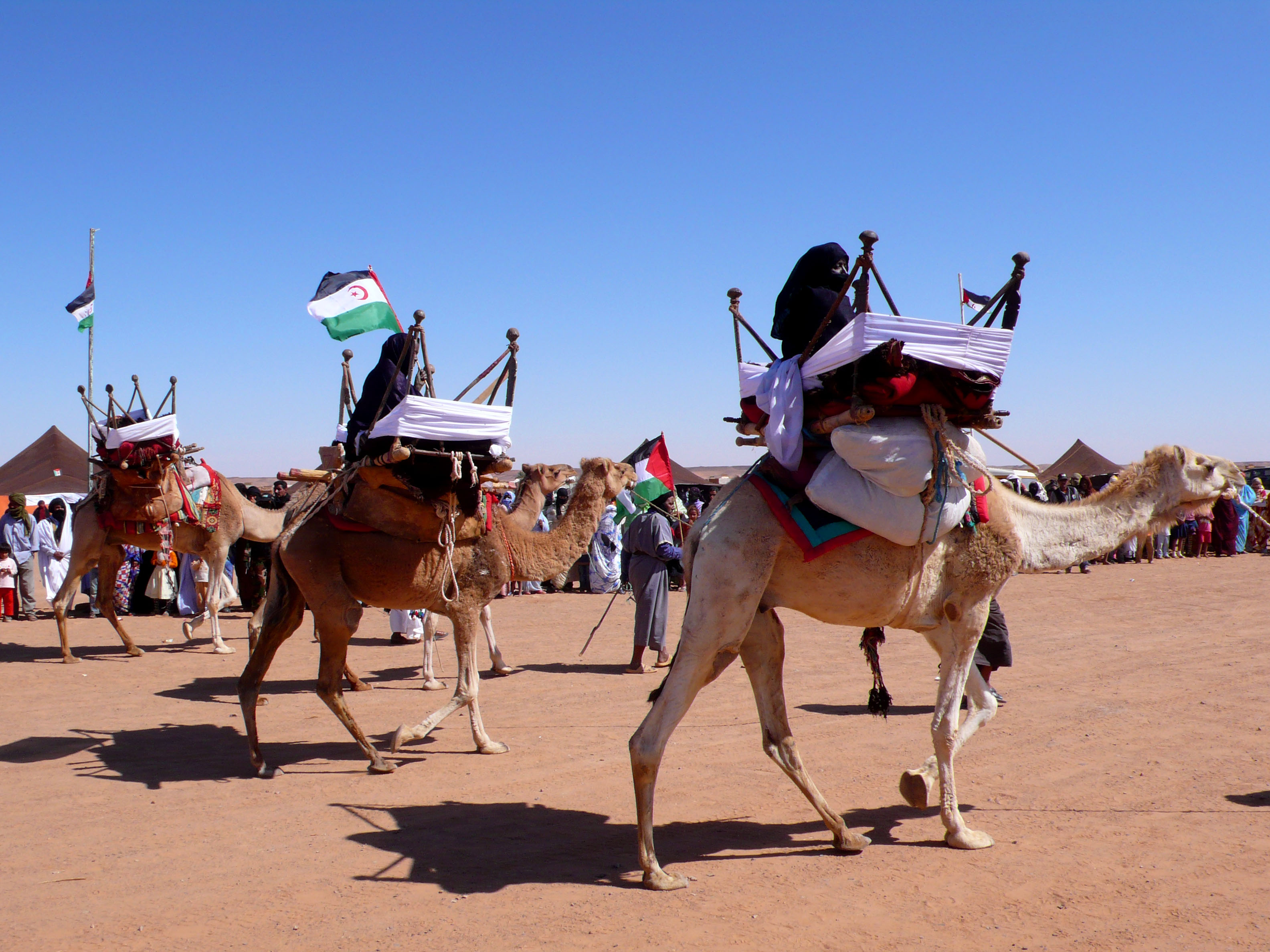

- Location within Algeria
- Coordinates: 26°44′47″N 7°15′47″W
- Country: Algeria
- Province: Tindouf Province
- District: Tindouf District
- Commune: Tindouf
- Elevation: 454 m (1,490 ft)

Population (2003)
  - Total: 38,180
- Time zone: UTC+1 (CET)
- Postal code: 37004
- ISO 3166 code: DZ-37

Dakhla refugee camp (Arabic: مخيم الداخلة) is a Sahrawi refugee camp in Tindouf province in southwestern Algeria. It is located 134 kilometres (83 mi) southeast of Tindouf near the Mauritanian border, and is the location of an iron mine. As of 2003, the camp has a population of about 38,180 Sahrawi refugees, according to UNHCR statistics. It is named after the city of Dakhla in Western Sahara.
