= Smara refugee camp =

Smara refugee camp مخيم السمارة
- Refugee Camp
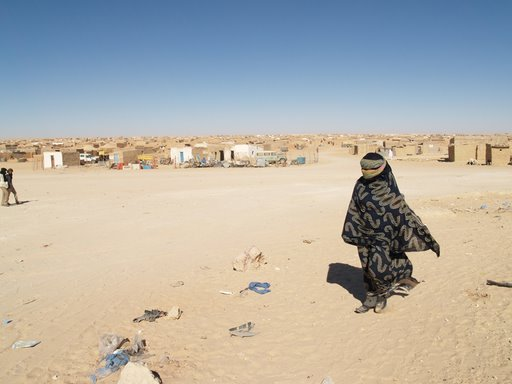

- Location within Algeria
- Coordinates: 27°29′26″N 7°49′37″W
- Country: Algeria
- Province: Tindouf

Population (2003)
  - Total: 39,000

Smara refugee camp (Arabic: مخيم السمارة) is one of the Sahrawi refugee camps located in Tindouf province in southwest Algeria. According to UNHCR statistics and the Algerian Red Crescent, the camp has a population of about 39,000 Sahrawi refugees. Attempts to create an accurate census have been met with resistance from the Moroccan government. The refugee camp was named after the Western Saharan city of Smara. It is located about 30 miles (50 km) from Tindouf.

After his visit to the Smara refugee camp, United Nations Secretary-General Ban Ki-moon spoke of a "human tragedy" and said the world "must act" to help the Sahrawi people. He rejected criticism from Morocco of his remarks on Western Sahara, and pledged to push for action to advance peace efforts.

== Notable people ==
Najla Mohamed-Lamin was born a refugee and she lives in the Smara camp. She opened the Almassar documentation centre and in 2023 she was included in that year's BBC 100 Women for her role in supplying education to women and children.
