= Algeria–Mauritania border =

International border

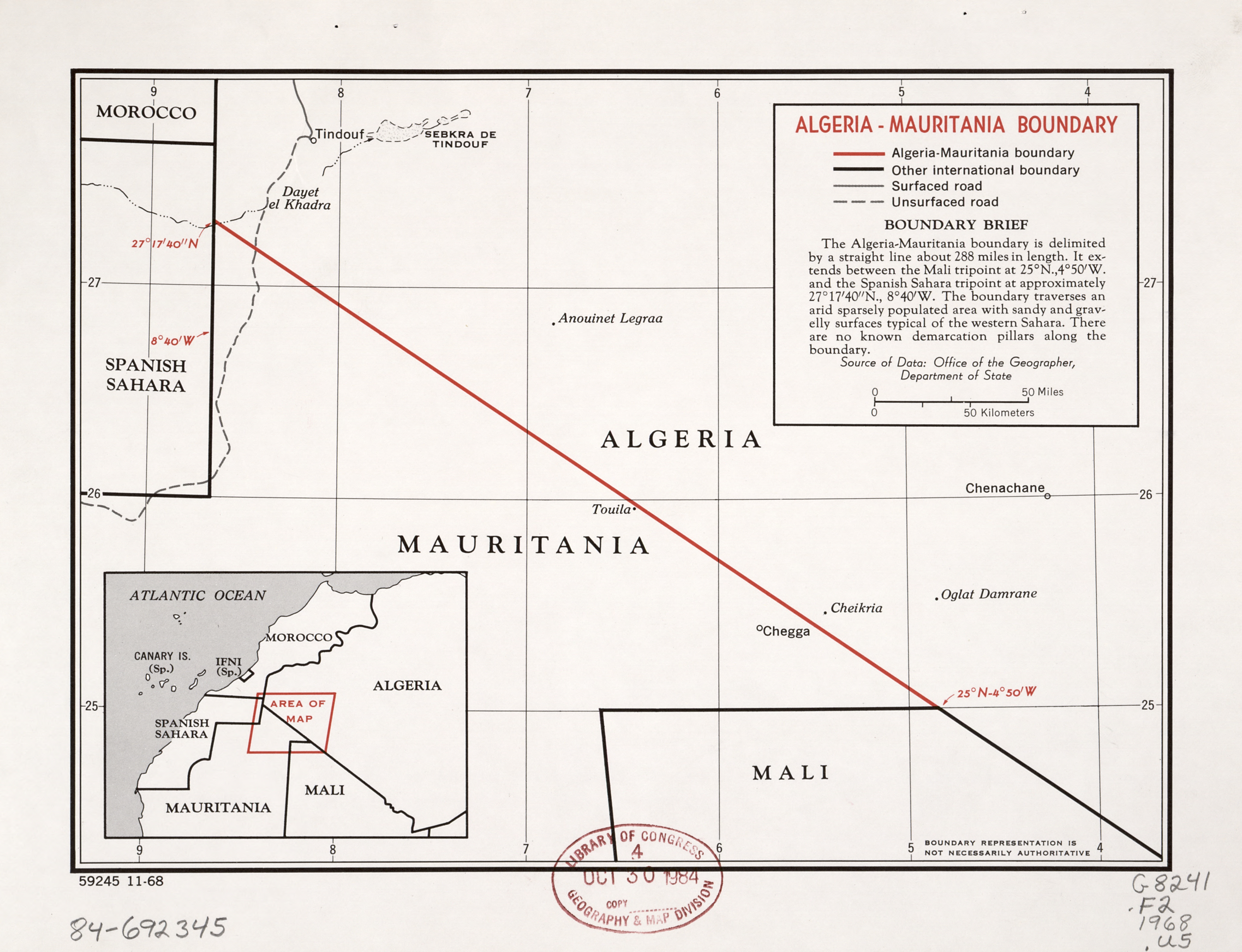
Map of the Algeria-Mauritania border

The Algeria–Mauritania border is 460 km (286 miles) in length and runs from the tripoint with Western Sahara in the west to the tripoint with Mali in the east.

== Description ==
The border consists of a single straight line orientated NW-SE connecting the Western Saharan and Malian tripoints. It runs through a remote, scarcely populated stretch of the Sahara desert.

== History ==
France had conquered most of northern Algeria during the period 1830-47, incorporating it as an integral part of France. The 1880s saw an intense competition between the European powers for territories in Africa, a process known as the Scramble for Africa. This culminated in the Berlin Conference of 1884, in which the European nations concerned agreed upon their respective territorial claims and the rules of engagements going forward. As a result of this France gained control the upper valley of the Niger River (roughly equivalent to the areas of modern Mali and Niger). France occupied this area in 1900, followed by Mauritania in 1903-4; these areas later became constituents of the federal colony of French West Africa (Afrique occidentale française, abbreviated AOF). In the meantime the French had been pushing south from the Algerian littoral, conquering much of the Algerian Sahara in 1902. A boundary between French West Africa and French Algeria (i.e. Algeria’s modern borders with Mauritania, Mali and Niger) was agreed upon 7 June 1905 by the Commandant of Upper Senegal and Niger and the Military Commander of the Department de l'Oasis within French Algeria. The border was further defined by the Niamey Convention of June 1909.

As the movement for decolonisation grew in the post-Second World War era, France gradually granted more political rights and representation for their sub-Saharan African colonies, culminating in the granting of broad internal autonomy to French West Africa in 1958 within the framework of the French Community. Eventually, in 1960, Mauritania was granted full independence. The situation in Algeria proved much more difficult, owing to the large community of French settlers in Algeria, and independence was only granted in 1962 after a bloody war. At that point the Algeria–Mauritania border became an international frontier between two sovereign states.

In 2018 the first ever border crossing between the two countries was proclaimed open, connecting Zouérat, Mauritania and Tindouf, Algeria, against a background of worsened insecurity in the Sahara region. As of 2023, the border crossing remains closed, with opening promised "soon".

== Settlements near the border ==
=== Algeria ===
- Garet Djebilet
- Chekria

=== Mauritania ===
- Chegga
- Touila

== See also ==
- Algeria–Mauritania relations
