= Sahrawis in Spain =

Part of the Sahrawi diaspora

الصحراويين في إسبانيا Saharauis en España
- (Sahrawi Arab Democratic Republic) (Spain)

Total population
- 3,000 – 12,000

Languages
- Hassaniya Arabic, Spanish (Saharan Spanish)

Religion
- Sunni Islam

Related ethnic groups
- Sahrawis, Afro-European

Sahrawis have been present in Spain since the Spanish colonisation of Western Sahara. The specific number of Spaniards of Sahrawi origin is unknown due to the fact that the Spanish government does not collect data on ethnicity or racial self-identification, together with Spain not recognising Sahrawi nationality documents from the largely unrecognised Sahrawi Arab Democratic Republic.

The overwhelming majority of applicants for status of statelessness in Spain are Sahrawis.

== History ==
According to a 2010 Supreme Court ruling, the Sahrawis born in the back then Spanish territory of the Spanish Sahara who did not opt for Spanish nationality in accordance with Royal Decree 2258/1976 of 10 August 1976 on the option of Spanish nationality by natives of the Sahara, have lost the right to Spanish nationality. Due to the Sahrawi Republic not being recognised by Spain, most Sahrawis ended up being recognised as stateless. Sahrawis living under Moroccan occupation got Moroccan citizenship.

In February 2023 the Congress of Deputies approved with the abstention of VOX and the rejection of PSOE the consideration of a bill proposed by Unidas Podemos to grant Spanish citizenship by naturalisation to the born in the territory of Western Sahara under the sovereignty of Spain before 1976, even if they do not have legal residence.

== Notable people ==
=== In entertainment and media ===
- Ebbaba Hameida, journalist
- Nadhira Mohamed, actress

=== Politicians ===
- Omar Lamin Abeidi, first Sahrawi elected to a Spanish regional parliament
- Tesh Sidi, first Sahrawi woman elected to the Congress of Deputies

=== In sports ===
- Ali Radjel, footballer

== See also ==
- Sahrawi Arab Democratic Republic–Spain relations
- Spanish Sahara
- Sahrawi people
- Arabs in Spain
- Afro-Spaniards
