= El Aaiun refugee camp =

Refugee camp in Tindouf, Algeria

El Aaiun refugee camp مخيم العيون
- Refugee Camp
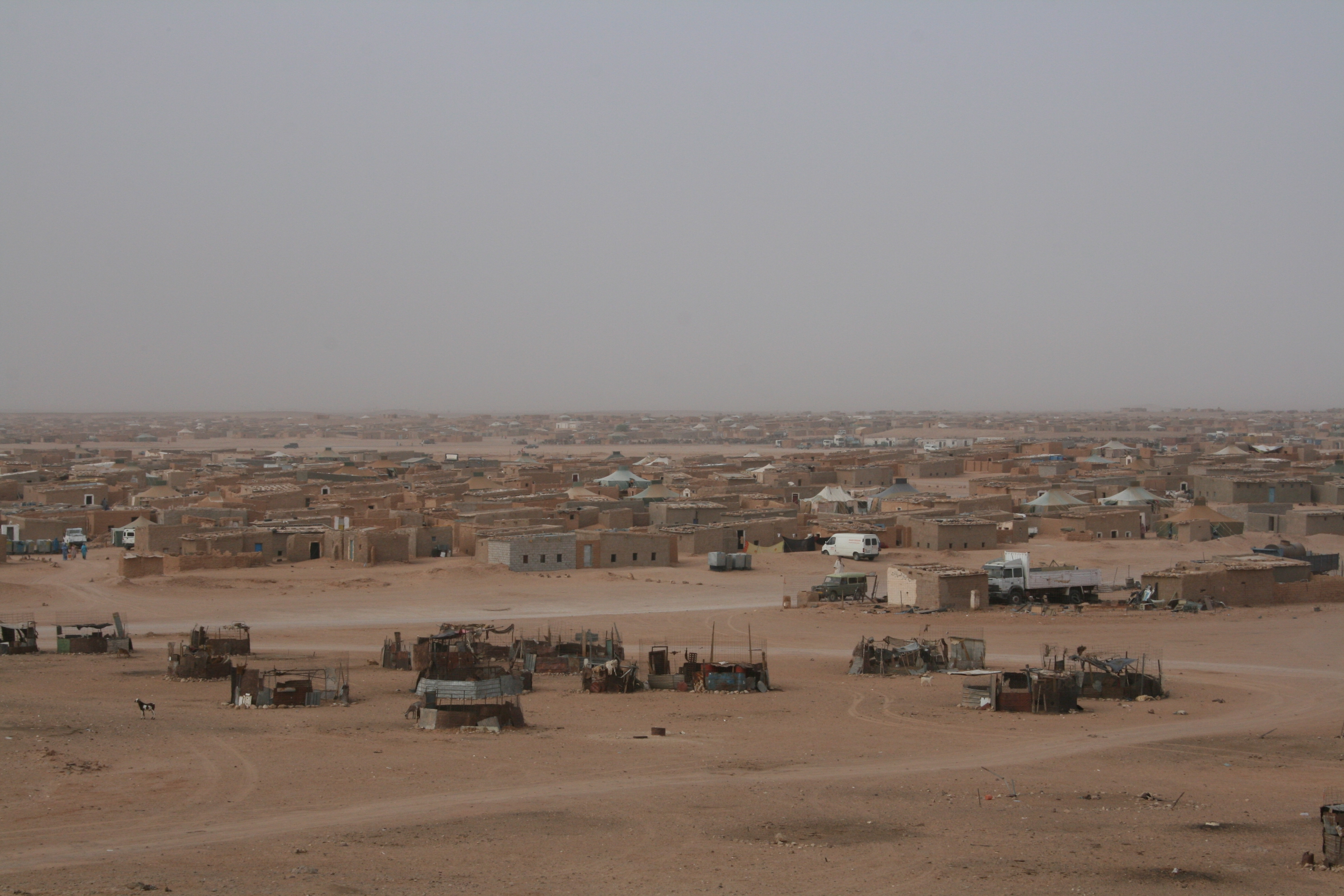

- Location within Algeria
- Coordinates: 27°44′22″N 8°1′0″W
- Country: Algeria
- Province: Tindouf

Population (2003)
  - Total: 36,675

El Aaiun refugee camp (Arabic: مخيم العيون) is one of the Sahrawi refugee camps located in Tindouf province in southwest Algeria. It is located 5 miles (10 km) from Tindouf. According to UNHCR statistics for 2003, the camp had a population of 36,675 Sahrawi refugees. The Algerian Red Crescent estimated that approximately 39,000 Sahrawi refugees live in the refugee camp.

The refugee camp was named after the Western Saharan city of El Aaiun. The Sahrawi Arab Democratic Republic is responsible for matters regarding the camp's population, while the government of Algeria acknowledges the rights of the Sahrawi refugees it hosts. The camp's inhabitants are Sahrawi refugees who were forced to flee their homes in Western Sahara in 1975 following the Moroccan invasion of the area and Western Sahara War. The refugee camp was established shortly after Rabouni, along with Smara camp. Regarding the camp, the mayor of El Aaiun camp has stated that "the houses are not permanent, the streets not paved, and no water pipes are installed," and that "nothing would fit the description of the camp as a city."

In El Aaiun, every da'ira (major subdivision) has a central market with 20 or 30 shops, along with a central market in its western perimeter that serves the whole camp.
