= Hassi Mounir =

- Village
- Location within Algeria
- Coordinates: 29°6′50″N 7°17′58″W
- Country: Algeria
- Province: Tindouf Province
- District: Tindouf District
- Commune: Oum El Assel
- Elevation: 455 m (1,493 ft)
- Time zone: UTC+1 (CET)

Hassi Mounir (also known as Hassi El Mounir) is a village in the commune of Oum El Assel, in Tindouf Province, Algeria. It is connected to the N50 national highway by a long local road leading southwest of the village. The village is the site of a project to introduce solar energy to Algeria, with 42 households connected to 6 solar power systems.
