= Mamia Chentouf =

Algerian midwife and women's rights activist

- Born: Mamia Aïssa; 1922; Haouz village, Tlemcen Province, Algeria
- Died: 10 October 2012 (aged 89–90); Algiers, Algeria
- Other names: Mamia Aissia, Mamya Chentouf
- Occupations: midwife, independence activist, women's rights activist
- Years active: 1944–1969

Mamia Chentouf (Arabic: ماميا شنتوف (1922–2012) was an Algerian midwife, independence activist and founder of the first women's rights organization in Algeria. Encouraged by her family to become educated, she attended the University of Algiers and completed training as a midwife. During her schooling, she joined the Algerian Independence Movement, which sought to free the country from French colonial rule. Using her work as a midwife to make contacts with other women, she rallied them to the nationalist cause and founded the first women's rights organization in the country. As part of the militant group, she was exiled, arrested and then fled to Tunis, Tunisia in 1955. While living there, she was one of the founders of the Algerian Red Crescent Society. At the end of the Independence War she became a journalist, returned to Algiers and studied political science. She served as organizer of the National Union of Algerian Women and was successful in creating family planning centers. Frustrated at an inability to change the family code to prohibit polygamy, she retired from politics in 1969.

== Early life ==
Mamia Aïssa was born in 1922 in Haouz village, near Bensekrane in the Tlemcen Province of Algeria to Elabdli Aïssa. When she was four years old her family had to flee because her father was wanted by the police. They moved to Oujda, Morocco, but as her father was a supporter of Ben Badis they moved again to Ghazaouet. Both parents were supportive of women's education and Aïssa, after completing her primary education was sent as a boarder to the high school in Mascara in 1935. During that time, she became interested in women's rights and wrote a paper on the emancipation of Muslim women. When she graduated in 1942, her father took her to the only university in Algeria to enroll in midwifery classes. They arrived almost simultaneously with the invasion of Algiers during the North African Campaign of World War II. Postponing her schooling, they left the capital and she taught for a year before returning to school and completed her training as a midwife.

== Career ==
When she had finished her training, Aïssa opened the first women's clinic in the Casbah of Algiers. During her studies, she had joined the Muslim Student's Association of North Africa (French: l’Association des étudiants musulmans d’Afrique du Nord (AEMAN)) and became involved in the Algerian People's Party (French: Parti du Peuple Algerien (PPA)). Taking part in peaceful demonstrations against the French colonial administration in 1945, she worked with Mimi Belahouel and Kheira Bouayed to smuggle the wounded protesters to safe havens after the French retaliation. In 1947, Aïssa became vice president of AEMAN and was responsible for recruiting women to join the PPA and fight for national independence. Her future husband, Abderezak Chentouf was president of the student association. She worked alongside Salima Belhaffaf, Nassima Hablal, Nefissa Hafiz, Nefissa Hamoud, Malika Mefti, Z'hor Reguimi, and Fatima Zekal, organizing women's cells to the cause. Soon thereafter, the PPA dissolved and the Movement for the Triumph of Democratic Liberties (MTDL) replaced it.

In 1947, Aïssa and Chentouf married. Later that year, she and Hamoud founded the Association of Algerian Muslim Women, the first organization for Algerian women. Reaffirming Arab Muslim culture, as opposed to French culture, and accepting the differences of men and women based on biological difference, the organization aimed to increase the political awareness of Algerian women and offer assistance to those whose spouses had been arrested or detained by the French government. Chentouf became president of the association and Hamoud served as secretary general. In addition to assisting dissidents, the organization encouraged education for boys and girls, distributed food and goods to the poor, and provided aid to those who were sick. Chentouf made many contacts to the cause through her midwifery services.

In 1954, Chentouf joined the National Liberation Front (NLF), after a split occurred in the leadership of MTDL. The following year, she was exiled and remained outside the country for several months during the declared state of emergency. When she returned, Chentouf joined Baya Larab and Hamoud, resuming their agitation, but she was arrested. Upon her release, because of intense surveillance, Chentouf went to Tunisia, where she was joined several months later by her husband. She became part of the group responsible for the creation of the Algerian Red Crescent Society in 1957. Because the NLF did not trust the French Red Cross and the terms of the Geneva Conventions were not recognized because of the internal nature of the conflict, activists hoped to gain both humanitarian aid and gain international acceptance by becoming members of the International Red Cross and Red Crescent. The first offices of the organization were established in Tangier, Morocco and Tunis, where Chentouf and her husband remained until 1962.

In 1961, Chentouf embarked on a career in journalism and was sent as a delegate to the Afro-Asian Women's Conference by the FLN, which was held in Cairo. Upon the conclusion of the war, the couple returned to Algiers and Chentouf entered the University of Algiers to study political science. When she graduated in 1965, she was in the first class promoted after independence. The following year, Chentouf was asked by Houari Boumediene, head of the Revolutionary Council, to organize the National Union of Algerian Women (French: Union Nationale des Femmes Algériennes (UNFA)). The aims of the organization were to hold a conference to address family planning and change the civil code. In 1967, UNFA opened the first family planning center in the maternity ward at Mustapha Hospital. They had much less success in modifying the family code as there was extreme opposition to abolishing polygamy, and in 1969, Chentouf resigned from UNFA and politics.

== Death and legacy ==
In 2007, a documentary Mamya Chentouf, militante de la première heure (Mamya Chentouf, activist of the first hour) was produced by Baya El Hachemi, to retell Chentouf's life story. In 2010, it was shown at the Algerian Cultural Center in Paris. Chentouf died on 10 October 2012, in Algiers. Two months after her death a tribute to her memory was hosted by the Wassila-Avife Network at the Palais de la Culture d'Algiers to recognize her contributions to independence and women's rights.
