= Bou Bernous =

- Village
- Location within Algeria
- Coordinates: 27°19′11″N 2°59′1″W
- Country: Algeria
- Province: Tindouf Province
- District: Tindouf District
- Commune: Oum El Assel
- Elevation: 378 m (1,240 ft)
- Time zone: UTC+1 (CET)

Bou Bernous is a village in the commune of Oum El Assel, in Tindouf Province, Algeria, located in a remote part of the Sahara Desert. Bou Bernous is notable for having the highest officially recorded average high temperature in the world, at 47 °C or 116.6 °F.
