= Hassi Khébi =

- Village
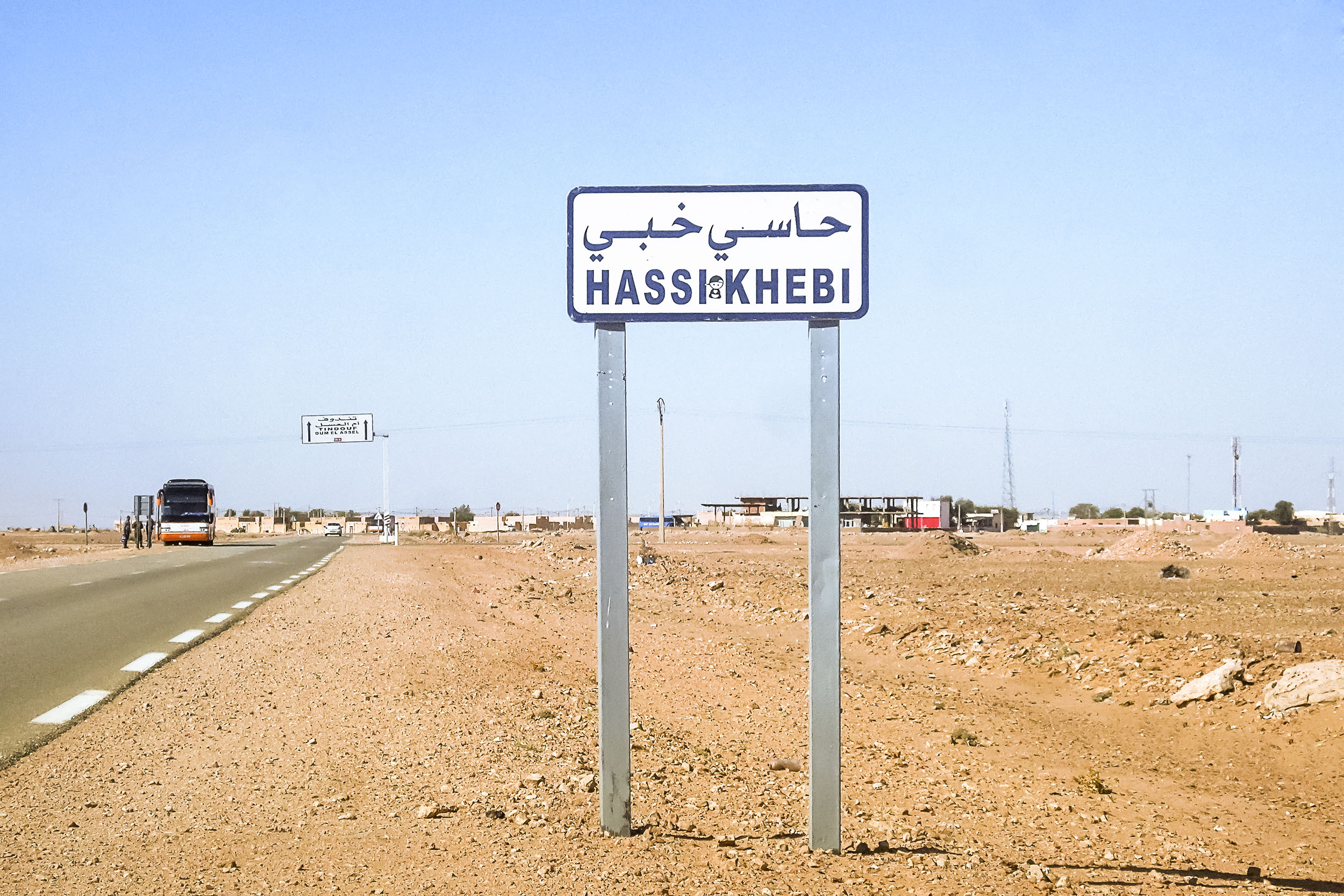
- Hassi Khébi

- Location within Algeria
- Coordinates: 29°11′9″N 5°4′32″W
- Country: Algeria
- Province: Tindouf Province
- District: Tindouf District
- Commune: Oum El Assel
- Elevation: 551 m (1,808 ft)
- Time zone: UTC+1 (CET)

Hassi Khébi (Arabic: حاسي خبي) is a village in the commune of Oum El Assel, in Tindouf Province, Algeria. It is located on the N50 national highway between Béchar and Tindouf.
