= Tinfouchy =

- Military base
- Location within Algeria
- Coordinates: 28°51′34″N 5°51′10″W
- Country: Algeria
- Province: Tindouf Province
- District: Tindouf District
- Commune: Oum El Assel
- Elevation: 574 m (1,883 ft)
- Time zone: UTC+1 (CET)

Tinfouchy is a locality and military base in the commune of Oum El Assel in Tindouf Province, Algeria. It is connected to the N50 national highway by a short local road to the north. It is the site of Tinfouchy Airport.
