= Touila =

Touila الطويلة
- Village
- Location within Algeria
- Country: Algeria
- Province: Tindouf Province
- District: Tindouf District
- Commune: Tindouf
- Time zone: UTC+1 (CET)

Touila (Arabic: الطويلة) is a settlement in the Sahara Desert of south-west Algeria on the border with Mauritania.
