= Fort Lotfi =

- Village and military base
- Location within Algeria
- Coordinates: 29°38′53″N 3°59′54″W
- Country: Algeria
- Province: Tindouf Province
- District: Tindouf District
- Commune: Oum El Assel
- Elevation: 556 m (1,824 ft)
- Time zone: UTC+1 (CET)

Fort Lotfi is a village and military base in the commune of Oum El Assel, in Tindouf Province, Algeria. It is connected to the N50 national highway by a short local road to the northwest.
