= Omar Lamin Abeidi =

Sahrawi-Spanish social worker and politician

Omar Lamin

Member of the Parliament of the Balearic Islands
- Incumbent
- Assumed office 20 June 2023
- Constituency: Mallorca

Personal details
- Born: 1988 or 1989 (age 36–37) Sahrawi refugee camps, Tindouf, Algeria
- Party: Socialist Party of the Balearic Islands
- Occupation: Social worker; politician

Omar Lamin i Abeidi is a Spanish social worker and politician of Sahrawi origin. He is a member of the Socialist Party of the Balearic Islands. He is the first person of immigrant background to become a member of the Parliament of the Balearic Islands and the first Sahrawi-Spaniard to become a member of a regional parliament in Spain. He was elected in the 2023 Balearic regional election.

== Early life ==
Omar Lamin was born in the Sahrawi refugee camps located in Tindouf, Algeria. He first came to the Balearic Islands at the age of seven to stay with a foster family as part of the "Summers in Peace" (Spanish: Vacaciones en Paz) project. He has lived in Palma de Mallorca since 1999.

== Political career ==
Omar joined the Spanish Socialist Workers' Party (PSOE) due to growing up in a family "with a socialist tradition". As a member of PSOE, he supported the "Socialists for the Sahara" initiative against the Spanish government's decision to support the Moroccan autonomy plan for Western Sahara. He is considered to have the support of the regional leader of PSOE's Balearic branch, Francina Armengol.

He was named Island Director of Community Care and Strategic Projects of the Mallorcan Institute of Social Affairs on 27 February 2021. He renounced to stabilize his temporary position in March 2023.

He was elected as a member of the Parliament of the Balearic Islands after the 2023 Balearic regional election, the first Sahrawi-Spaniard to be elected to a regional parliament in Spain. He works on the "just struggle of the Sahrawi people and so that all the people who have been forced to flee can return home".
