= Omar Hilale =

Moroccan diplomat

- عمر هلال
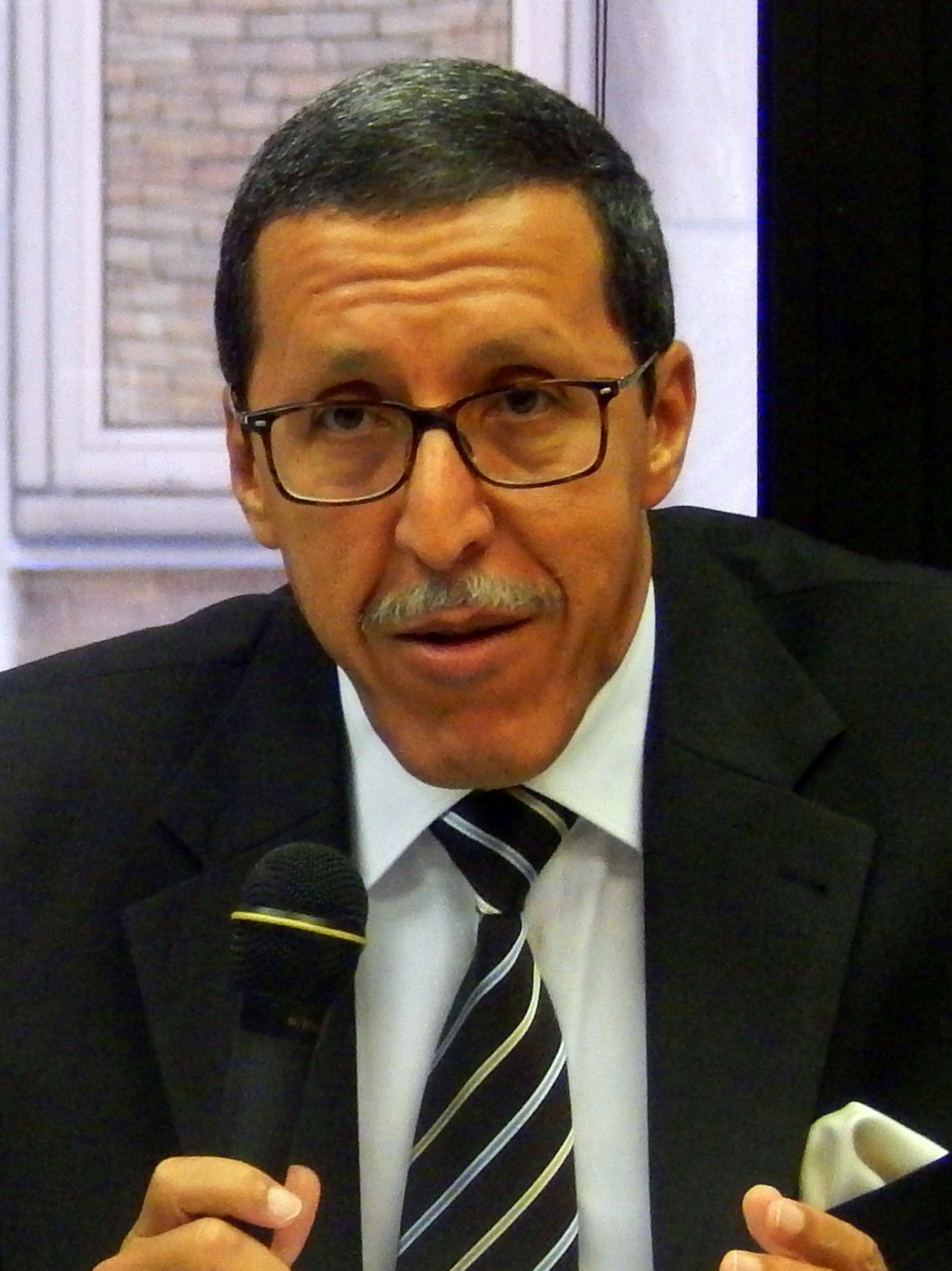
- Hilale in 2014

Permanent Representative of Morocco to the United Nations
- Incumbent
- Assumed office April 2014
- Monarch: Mohammed VI
- Prime Minister: Abdelilah Benkirane; Saadeddine El Othmani; Aziz Akhannouch; Fatima Ezzahra El Mansouri
- Preceded by: Mohammed Loulichki

Permanent Representative of Morocco to the United Nations in Geneva
- In office November 2008 – April 2014
- Monarch: Mohammed VI
- Preceded by: Mohammed Loulichki
- Succeeded by: Mohamed Aujjar
- In office December 2001 – May 2005
- Monarch: Mohammed VI
- Succeeded by: Mohammed Loulichki

Secretary-General of the Ministry of Foreign Affairs and Cooperation
- In office 2005–2008
- Monarch: Mohammed VI

Ambassador to Indonesia, Singapore, Australia, and New Zealand
- In office 1996–2001
- Monarchs: Hassan II; Mohammed VI

Personal details
- Born: January 1, 1951 (age 75) Oulad Teima, Morocco
- Education: Mohammed V University
- Profession: Diplomat

Omar Hilale (Arabic: عمر هلال; Berber languages: ⵄⵓⵎⴰⵔ ⵀⵉⵍⴰⵍ; born 1 January 1951) is a Moroccan career diplomat. He has been Morocco's Permanent Representative to the United Nations in New York since he was appointed in this position in April 2014. He used to be the permanent representative of Morocco to the UN in Geneva.

Hilale is a graduate of the Mohammed V University in Rabat where he obtained a bachelor's degree in political science in 1974. He served in many diplomatic posts such as ambassador to Singapore, New Zealand, Australia and Indonesia, between 1996 and 2001. He was the General Secretary of the Ministry of Foreign Affairs and Cooperation between 2005 and 2008. In November 2008 he became Representative of Morocco to the UN in Geneva. On 8 April 2020, he was appointed co-facilitator for the process of strengthening the United Nations human rights treaty bodies.

In February 2021 he presented a letter to the UN from on behalf of Morocco, alleging that the Polisario Front fabricated reports of armed conflict and human rights violations against the Sahrawi people and incited violence in league with Algerian state media. He specifically denounced Sultana Khaya as "a supporter of violence" and for using "human rights for political ends". Moroccan authorities have kept her under de facto house arrest since 2020, and Khaya has been repeatedly attacked, subject to sexual assault and raids on her house, as reported by a number of human rights groups.

In July 2021, he expressed support for "self-determination" of the Kabyle people, leading to Algeria recalling its ambassador in Morocco.
