= Ebbaba Hameida =

Sahrawi-Spanish journalist

- أبابة حميدة
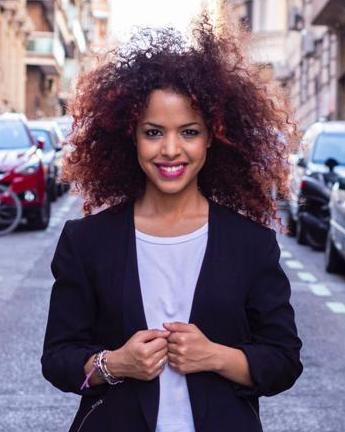
- Ebbaba Hameida in 2019
- Born: 15 November 1992 (age 33); El Aaiún, Sahrawi refugee camps
- Education: Complutense University of Madrid
- Occupation: Journalist
- Employer: Radio Televisión Española
- Organization: Reporters Without Borders
- Website: www.ebbabahameida.net

Ebbaba Hameida Hafed (Arabic: أبابة حميدة الحافظ; born 15 November 1992) is a Sahrawi-Spaniard journalist. She is currently a writer for Radio Televisión Española (RTVE), highlighting her work on migration and women's rights. She has been a member of the board of directors of the Spanish section of Reporters Without Borders since May 2020.

In March 2019, she was one of the spokespersons for the movement of women journalists, together with Carmen Sarmiento, Diana Aller and Rosa Alcázar, demanding professional journalism avoiding stereotypes and sexism and demanding extreme care when reporting on violence against women.

She was the first Sahrawi woman to earn a doctorate cum laude in Journalism.

== Biography ==
Ebbaba was born in the El Aaiún Sahrawi refugee camp located in Tindouf, Algeria. She left the refugee camps at the age of 5 due to her struggle with celiac disease. She first grew up in Rome with an Italian foster family, living there for 9 years. She decided to return to the refugee camps so as not to give up her roots, but given the extreme conditions of the refugee camps and the lack of adequate food for her celiac disease, she later moved to Spain where in 2008 she was initially welcomed by a family from Don Benito (Extremadura).

She enrolled in the Faculty of Information Sciences at the Complutense University of Madrid, graduating in 2015, later completing a master's degree in journalism at Radio Televisión Española. She explained that she chose to study journalism because the radio has historically been the main element of connection with the outside world in the Sahrawi refugee camps and that for her it has always been a close means to publicize the situation of the Sahrawi people. She prepared her doctorate on the situation of women in Muslim-majority countries between 2020 and 2021.

=== Trajectory ===
She participated in the 26th session of the United Nations Human Rights Council on 16 June 2024 as a representative of the organization International Youth and Student Movement for the United Nations (ISMUN) demanding the respect to the right to self-determination, specifically for the Sahrawi people, and denouncing the human rights situation in Western Sahara, especially that of Sahrawi women.

While she was a student, she hosted the radio program Rysala Sahara on the radio station of the Faculty of Information Sciences about the day-to-day of the Western Sahara conflict.

She directed the documentary Roots and Clamor (Spanish: Raíces y Clamor) in 2014, where she reflects on the difficulties of young Sahrawis studying in Spain, the need to search for roots and the individual and personal conflict they face.

In 2016 she was one of the promoters of OpenSpain, a project supported by Telefónica in which a team made up of young volunteers from Spain, Syria, Iraq, Iran, Venezuela and Western Sahara developed a web page and a mobile application in Spanish, English and Arabic with useful information for war refugees arriving in Spain.

She was co-host of the program Daring (Spanish: Atrevidos) on Radio 3 after specializing in radio and television with a master's degree on RTVE in 2017 with Marta Curiel, participating in the project A microphone for the Sahara (Spanish: Un micro para el Sáhara).

In 2018 she participated in the solidarity project promoted by the NGO Leaozinho "The yellow suitcase" to find material and install a radio studio in Senegal.

In May 2019 she was one of the guests of the Spanish section of Reporters Without Borders on the occasion of the celebration of World Press Freedom Day.

From 2018 to 2020 she was an editor and presenter for Radio Nacional de España (RNE), a collaborator in the "Ultravioleta" section on women's rights on the Efecto Doppler program on RNE and on the Televisión Española (TVE) program Cámara abierta 2.0. She has also collaborated on Planeta Futuro on El País and FronteraD.

In December 2020, she joined the RTVE editorial staff, focusing on immigration and women's rights. In March 2021, she coordinated the project "30 women who are changing the world" on RTVE's website.

In November 2021 she received the Desalambre Award in the category of Best Written Chronicle or Report for her work Fátima's pain, ten years without news of his missing son in the Mediterranean (Spanish: El dolor de Fátima, diez años sin noticias de su hijo desaparecido en el Mediterráneo), published on RTVE.es. The Desalambre awards are granted and organized by elDiario.es to recognize the work of journalists and social organizers in defense of human rights.

In June 2022 she received the Dircom Special Award in recognition of her work as a correspondent in the Russian invasion of Ukraine. In November 2022 she won the Paco Rabal award for cultural journalism from the AISGE Foundation in the Young Promise category for her report "Saving the Russian cultural legacy in Ukraine: Art must stay out of war."
