= Arabs in Spain =

Arabs in Spain عرب إسبانيا Árabes en España
Total population
- 1,600,000–1,800,000

Regions with significant populations
- Andalusia, the Community of Madrid, Catalonia, the Valencian Community, Extremadura

Languages
- Arabic, Spanish

Religion
- Islam and Christianity

Related ethnic groups
- Arab people, Arab diaspora, Arab American, Arab Argentine, Arab Brazilian, Arab Canadians, Arab Mexican

There have been Arabs in Spain (Arabic: عرب إسبانيا; Spanish: Árabes en España) since the early 8th century when the Umayyad conquest of the Iberian Peninsula created the state of Al-Andalus. In modern times there are expatriates from a range of Arab countries, particularly Morocco, Algeria, Lebanon, Syria, the Palestinian Territories, and Iraq; and also small groups from Egypt, Tunisia, Libya, Jordan and Sudan. As a result of the Arab Spring (Libyan Civil War and Syrian Civil War), many have the status of refugees or illegal immigrants, trying to immigrate especially to France, Germany and Sweden. The Arab population in Spain is estimated to be between 1,600,000 and 1,800,000.

== See also ==
- Arab diaspora
- Arabs in Europe
- Sahrawis in Spain
- Moroccans in Spain
- Lebanese diaspora
- Syrian diaspora
- Palestinian diaspora
- Moroccan diaspora
- Iraqi diaspora
- Egyptian diaspora
