= Oum El Assel =

Oum El Assel أم العسل
- Commune and town
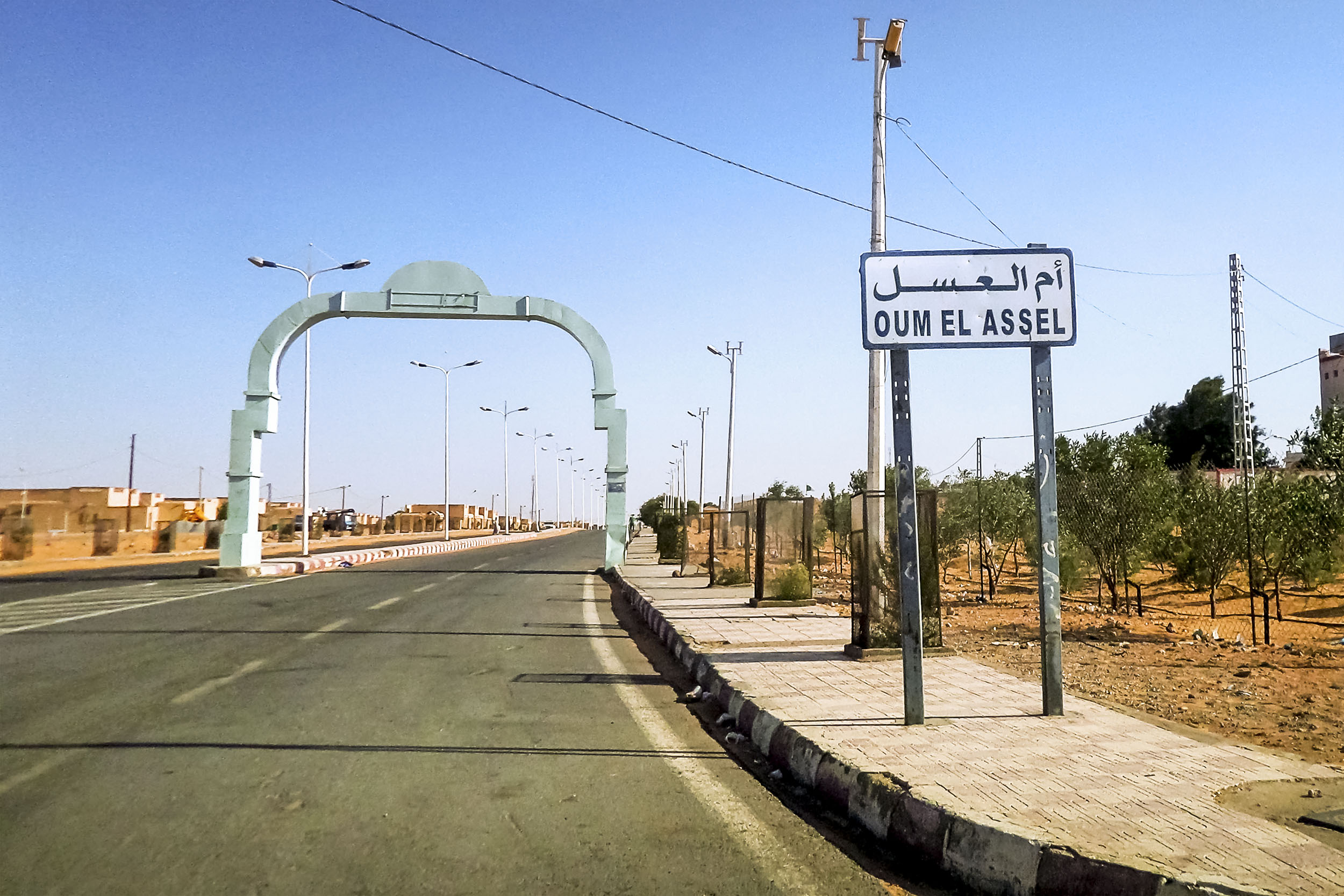

- Location of Oum El Assel commune within Tindouf Province

- Location of Oum El Assel within Algeria
- Coordinates: 28°36′45″N 6°58′44″W
- Country: Algeria
- Province: Tindouf
- District: Tindouf

Government
  - PMA Seats: 7

Area
  - Total: 88,865 km^{2} (34,311 sq mi)
- Elevation: 526 m (1,726 ft)

Population (2008)
  - Total: 3,183
  - Density: 0.03582/km^{2} (0.09277/sq mi)
- Time zone: UTC+01 (CET)
- Postal code: 37010
- ONS code: 3702

Oum El Assel (Arabic: أم العسل, lit. mother of the honey) is a town and commune in the district and province of Tindouf, Algeria. At the 2008 census it had a population of 3,183, up from 1,794 in 1998, and an annual population growth rate of 6.0%. It is the least populated, largest, and least densely populated of the two communes which form the province (the other one being Tindouf). The town of Oum El Assel is located on the southern side of the N50 national highway 150 kilometres (93 mi) northeast of Tindouf.

== Climate ==
Oum El Assel has a hot desert climate (Köppen climate classification BWh), with very hot summers and mild winters. Rainfall is light and sporadic, and summers are particularly dry.

== Economy ==
One of its villages, Hassi Mounir, is one of the country's projects to introduce solar energy in Algeria, and has 42 houses connected to solar energy. The natural resources of the municipality (travertine, sand, and clay, among others) are still unexploited due to the existence of a large hamada (rock desert) in the region. There are projects for the creation of a glass factory, a freestone factory, and for a factory specialized in processing limestone products.

== Education ==
2.4% of the population has a tertiary education, and another 13.1% has completed secondary education. The overall literacy rate is 82.5%, and is 91.1% among males and 73.5% among females.

== Localities ==
The commune is composed of six localities:

- Oum El Assel
- Hassi Mounir
- Hassi Khébi
- Bou Bernous
- Bouagba
- Fort Lofti

The military base of Tinfouchy also lies within the commune.
