= Sultana Khaya =

Sahrawi human rights activist

- سلطانة خيا
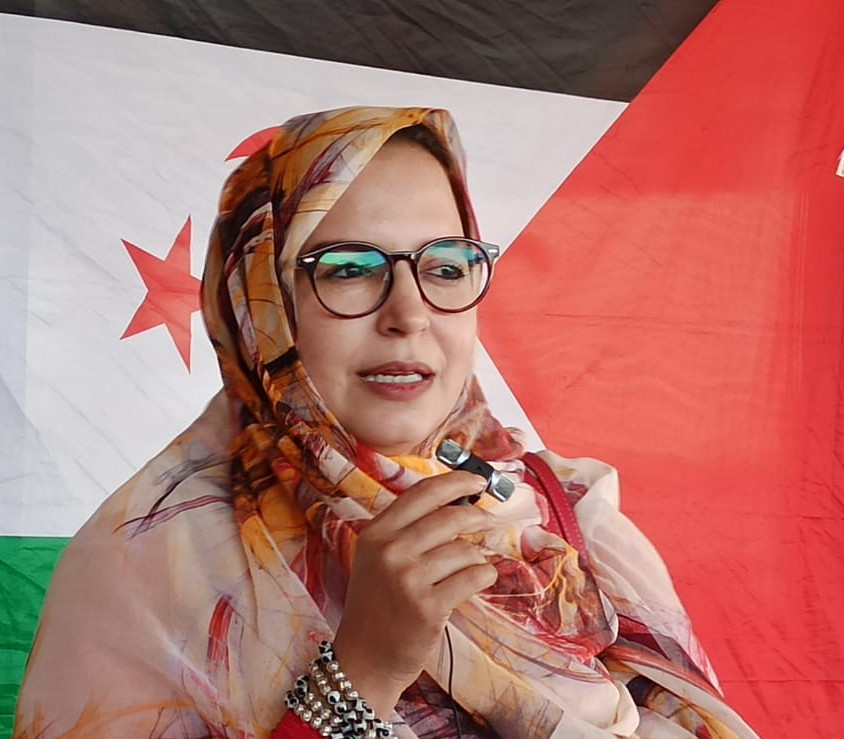
- Born: Sultana Sidi Brahim Khaya; 1980 (age 45–46); Bojador, Western Sahara
- Occupation: Human rights activist
- Organization(s): League for the Defence of Human Rights and against Plunder of Natural Resources
- Known for: Advocating for the independence of Western Sahara and self-determination
- Awards: Sakharov Prize (nominee)

Sultana Sidi Brahim Khaya (Arabic: سلطانة سيدي براهيم خيا), also known as Sultana Khaya (Arabic: سلطانة خيا / Spanish transliteration: Sultana Jaya), is a Sahrawi human rights activist and an advocate of the independence of Western Sahara and self-determination.

== Biography ==
Sultana Khaya is the president of an organisation called the ‘League for the Defence of Human Rights and against Plunder of Natural Resources’ and is known for her vocal activism in defence of the right of self-determination for the Sahrawi people. She is also a member of the Sahrawi Organ against Moroccan Repression (ISACOM). According to a UN press release published in July 2021, Sultana has been "repeatedly harassed by Moroccan authorities and lost an eye when attacked by a police officer in 2007". On 30 November 2021, Amnesty International issued an urgent action call "to put an immediate end to the brutal attacks against Sultana Khaya and her family and to carry out a prompt, thorough, independent, impartial, transparent and effective investigation into the security forces’ abusive force and attacks against her and her family, including the report of rape and sexual assault, and ensure that those suspected to be responsible are brought to justice in fair trials".

Morocco's Permanent Representative to the United Nations, Omar Hilale, specifically denounced Sultana Khaya as "a supporter of violence" and for using "human rights for political ends", when he presented a letter to the UN on behalf of Morocco alleging that the Polisario Front fabricated reports of armed conflict and human rights violations against the Sahrawi people and incited violence in league with Algerian state media. Moroccan authorities have kept her under de facto house arrest since November 2020, and Khaya has been repeatedly attacked, experiencing sexual assault and raids on her house. As reported by Amnesty International, in one incident on 15 November 2021, plainclothes Moroccan security forces broke into Khaya's home, raped her, and sexually assaulted her sisters and mother.

On 5 December 2021, Khaya reported on her personal Twitter feed that her house had come under attack, that all members of her family had been attacked, including her mother, and that she had been injected with an unknown substance. She attributed the attack to Moroccan [security] services.

In 2021, The Left in the European Parliament – GUE/NGL nominated her for the Sakharov Prize. In March 2022, a delegation of US-based volunteers, which included the acting president of the Veterans for Peace, broke the 482-day siege of Khaya's home in Western Sahara by visiting her.

== See also ==
- Aminatou Haidar
- Nazha El Khalidi
