= Awserd refugee camp =

Awserd refugee camp مخيم أوسرد
- Refugee Camp
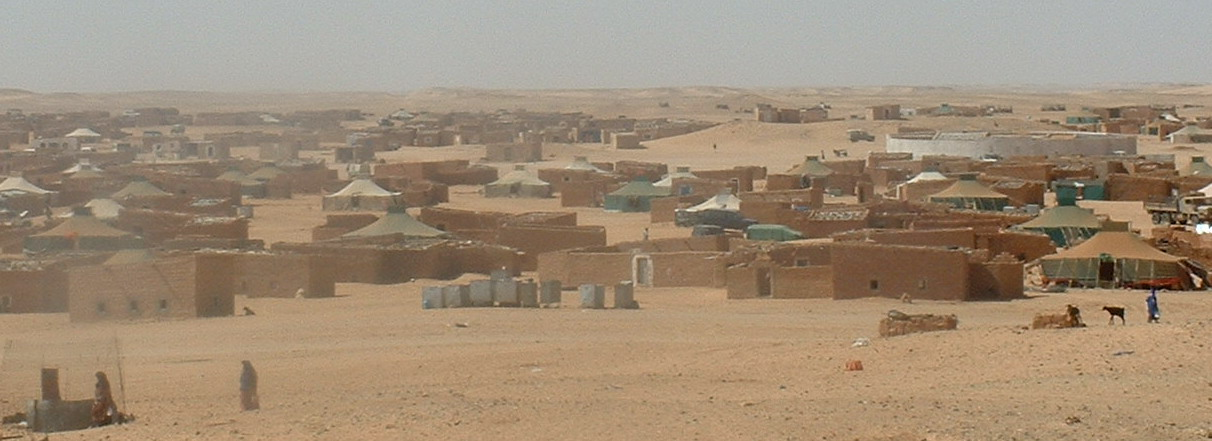

- Location within Algeria
- Coordinates: 27°37′52″N 7°52′28″W
- Country: Algeria
- Province: Tindouf

Population (2003)
  - Total: 32,624

Awserd refugee camp (Arabic: مخيم أوسرد) is a Sahrawi refugee camp located in Tindouf province in southwestern Algeria. As of 2003, the camp had a population of about 32,624 refugees. It is named after Awserd in Western Sahara.

The UNHCR has completed the installation of a water pipeline system in the Awserd camp, ensuring that the refugees in the camp have access to safe drinking water. The 17th edition of the Sahara International Film Festival took place in the Awserd refugee camp from 11 to 16 October 2022, under the slogan "Let's end colonialism in Western Sahara." The closing ceremony was overseen by Minister of Culture of the Sahrawi Arab Democratic Republic, Al-Ghouth Mamouni.
