= Association of Algerian Muslim Women =

Algerian Islamic Organization

- Established: 1947 (79 years ago)
- Types: Organization
- Headquarters: Algeria
- Country: Algeria
- Directors: Mamia Chentouf

The Association of Algerian Muslim Women (AFMA) is a women's organization in Algeria, founded in 1947.

== History ==
The women's movement in Algeria originated in the liberation movement from French colonialism in the 1940s, when women were mobilised in the struggle and integrated in the political system. The two pioneer women's groups were Algerian Women's Union (UFA), which was affiliated with the Algerian Communist Party (PCA), and the Association of Algerian Muslim Women (AFMA), founded in 1947 to mobilise women in support of political prisoners and their families.

The two women's groups both offered a more public role for women, which made it possible for them to leave traditional seclusion and participate in public life. The UFA included women across all levels of the Algerian Communist Party, which advocated equality between men and women, both educational professional and political. The AFMA mobilised both women aand men in the struggle against French colonialism, but expected women to step back from public life once independence from France had been won. The 1940s gave rise to an intensified need for women to be able to gain equality, especially through the use of political parties. The UFA was largely made up of European women, not that it excluded Muslim women.

The AMA was created in 1947 aiming for women's liberation specifically concerning the imprisonments following protests on May 8, 1945. This was when France celebrated the end of Nazi rule while thousands of Algerians took protested in the streets of Setif and other cities to fight for Algerian independence as had been France's promise in exchange for troops in the Allied war effort peacefully claim Algeria's independence, as France had promised if they supported it in her fight against Nazism, however, Frances response was the brutal massacre of 45,000 Algerians followed by sporadic mass killings.

The AFMA was primarily made up of intellectual women. It was run by Mamia Chentouf and aimed to defend the ‘biological differences between men and women and affirmed Arab Muslim culture’. This is despite writings in the Quran not preventing women from ‘carrying out work in the government or in society in general’ and since then the ‘ulama’ has been quoted by Djamila Hanafi to have become ‘the most distinctive and prominent school in Algeria's intellectual landscape’ .

A significant part of the association was the publication of the L’Algérie libre, which argued that the role of women in the Arab-Muslim world could only be explored in a "cultural framework free of western influence". When the revolution occurred, violence against women, through torture, rape, arrest, and execution, and the widening of support for female solidarity against colonial rule expanded across Algeria. Before this ability to contribute in a larger way to public life, women were understood under patriarchal and colonial setup to be homemakers. They would look after large families in isolated industrialised slums They would be illiterate, leaving behind little documentation of their experiences. They were voiceless in terms of society, politics, and culture, even after Algerian independence.

When the revolution occurred and when armed conflict broke out, the leaders of these two feminist groups joined freedom fighters. Nafissa Hamoud, the AFMA leader, was the first female doctor to join the movement.

== Legacy ==
Women in the AFMA and other groups went on to contribute to the nationalist movement in Algeria under the umbrella of the women's section of the FLN, which existed for approximately a year between 1961 and 1962.
