= Mostapha Sahel =

Moroccan diplomat and politician

Permanent Representative of Morocco to the United Nations
- In office March 2006 – November 2008
- Monarch: Mohammed VI
- Preceded by: Mohamed Bennouna
- Succeeded by: Mohammed Loulichki

Minister of the Interior
- In office November 2002 – February 2006
- Monarch: Mohammed VI
- Preceded by: Driss Jettou
- Succeeded by: Chakib Benmoussa

Personal details
- Born: May 5, 1946 El Jadida, Morocco
- Died: October 7, 2012 (aged 66) Rabat, Morocco
- Education: Mohammed V University; French university (DES)
- Profession: Diplomat, politician, executive

Mostapha Sahel (5 May 1946 in El Jadida – 7 October 2012 in Rabat) was a Moroccan diplomat and politician. He served as Minister of the Interior and earlier as Minister of Fishing. He was also Morocco's Permanent Representative to the United Nations from 2006 to 2008. After leaving the government, he served as an advisor to King Mohammed VI until his death.

Mostapha Sahel was also the CEO of the Tourism and Real estate firm SOMED.

== Biography ==
In 1964 he obtained a literary Baccalauréat from the Lycée Mohammed V of Casablanca in 1964 and graduated in 1967 from the Mohammed V University in Rabat with a Licence degree. In 1969 he obtained a DES (Diplôme d'études supérieures) from France, a defunct French degree which was required for the Concours of civil service. In 1970 he joined the Inspection General de Finances.

== Sources ==
- https://web.archive.org/web/20061021012808/http://www.mincom.gov.ma/french/minister/biographies/MustaphaSahel.htm
- http://www.bibliomonde.com/pages/fiche-geo-donnee.php3?id_page_donnee=41
- https://web.archive.org/web/20060605124456/http://www.radiokcentrale.it/news4.htm
