= Mohammed Loulichki =

Moroccan diplomat

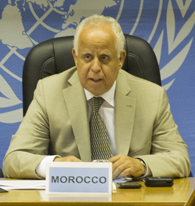
- Mohammed Loulichki in 2013

Permanent Representative of Morocco to the United Nations
- In office November 2008 – April 2014
- Monarch: Mohammed VI
- Preceded by: El Mostafa Sahel
- Succeeded by: Omar Hilale

Personal details
- Born: January 1, 1952 (age 74) Fez, Morocco
- Education: Mohammed V University
- Profession: Diplomat

Mohammed Loulichki (born 1952 in Fes) is a Moroccan diplomat. He was Morocco's Permanent Representative to the United Nations in New York between November 2008 and 14 April 2014.

Loulichki has also been the Permanent Representative of Morocco to the United Nations in Geneva and the Moroccan ambassador to Bosnia and Herzegovina, Croatia, and Hungary.

In December 2012, Loulichki was the President of the United Nations Security Council.
