= Permanent Representative of Morocco to the United Nations =

Ambassador and Permanent Representative of Morocco to the United Nations
- Incumbent; Omar Hilale since April 2014
- Style: His Excellency
- Appointer: Mohammed VI
- Formation: 1956
- Website: Permanent Mission

The role of the ambassador and permanent representative of Morocco to the United Nations is as the leader of the Moroccan delegation to the United Nations in New York and as head of the Permanent Mission of Morocco to the UN. The position has the rank and status of an ambassador extraordinary and plenipotentiary and is also the representative of Morocco in the United Nations Security Council (1963–1964, 1992–1993, 2012–2013).

The permanent representative, currently Omar Hilale, is charged with representing Morocco, both through its non-permanent seat on the U.N. Security Council and also during plenary meetings of the General Assembly, except in the rare situation in which a more senior officer (such as the minister of foreign affairs or the king) is present.

== Office holders ==
Incumbent	Start of term	End of term	Notes
Ahmed Taibi Benhima	January, 8 1963	1965	
Dey Ould Sidi Baba	July, 13 1965	March, 11 1967	
Ahmed Taibi Benhima	March, 20 1967		
Mehdi Mrani Zentar	February, 25 1971		
Driss Slaoui	September, 16 1974		
Ali Bengelloun	August, 25 1976		
Abdellatif Filali	May, 5 1978		
Mehdi Mrani Zentar	May, 30 1980		
Ali Bengelloun	August, 29 1984		
Moulay Mehdi Alaoui	April, 15 1985		
Driss Slaoui	September, 18 1986		
Aziz Hasbi	June, 18 1990		
Moulay Ali Skalli	January 1991		
Ahmed Snoussi	Octobre, 16 1991	2001	
Mohamed Bennouna	April, 9 2001	March 2006	
Mostapha Sahel	March, 2 2006	November 2008	
Mohammed Loulichki	November, 21 2008	14 April 2014	
Omar Hilale	April, 23 2014	present	

== See also ==
- Morocco and the United Nations
- Foreign relations of Morocco
