= Sahrawi Red Crescent =

Emergency assistance organisation in the Sahrawi Republic

Sahrawi Red Crescent الهلال الأحمر الصحراوي Media Luna Roja Saharaui Croissant Rouge Saharaoui
- Formation: November 26, 1975; 50 years ago
- Type: Aid agency
- Purpose: Humanitarian Aid
- Headquarters: Sahrawi refugee camps, Tindouf, Algeria
- Origins: Western Sahara
- Region served: Sahrawi refugee camps • Free Zone
- Owner: Sahrawi Arab Democratic Republic
- President: Bouhbeni Yahya Bouhbeni
- Endowment: Public and private donations

The Sahrawi Red Crescent Society is an emergency assistance organisation in the Sahrawi Arab Democratic Republic. It is not a part of the International Red Cross and Red Crescent Movement.

== Foundation ==
The Sahrawi Red Crescent was formed by Sahrawi citizens on November 26, 1975, days after the joint Moroccan-Mauritanian invasion of former Spanish Sahara territory.

== Mission ==
During the first years of the organization, its major task was to reunite families who were scattered due to the Western Sahara War, consequently displacing them to the subsequent Sahrawi refugee camps established in Tindouf, Algeria while facing the aerial bombardments of the Moroccan Air Force. The organisation is currently operating in the refugee camps and the Free Zone in Western Sahara.
