= Tesh Sidi =

Sahrawi-Spanish engineer and politician

Tesh Sidi MP
- تسلم سيدي
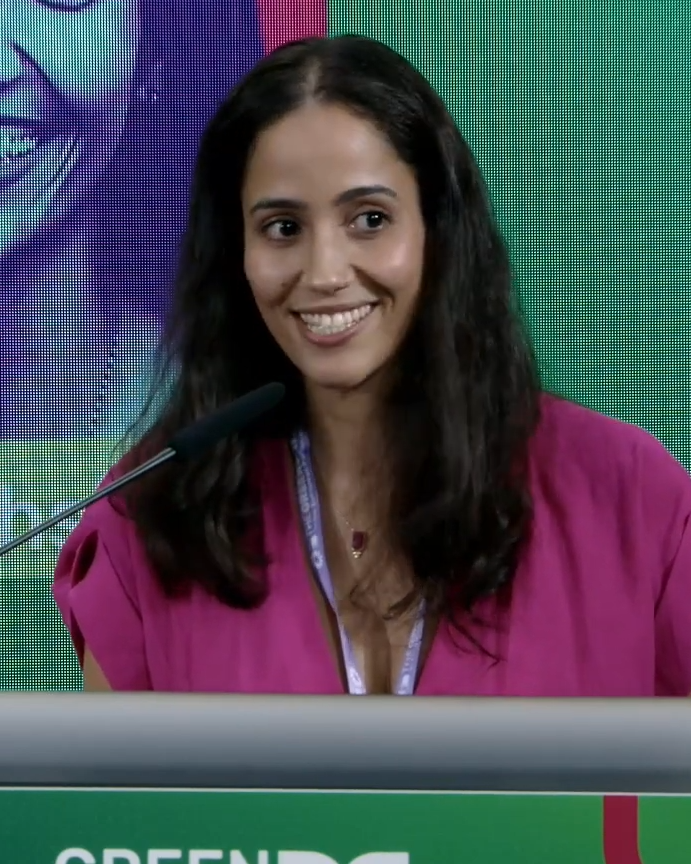
- Sidi in 2023.

Member of the Congress of Deputies
- Incumbent
- Assumed office 17 August 2023
- Constituency: Madrid

Personal details
- Born: Teslem Andala Ubbi; 30 May 1994 (age 32) Auserd, Sahrawi refugee camps, Tindouf, Algeria
- Party: Más Madrid (2023–present)
- Other political affiliations: Polisario Front
- Education: University of Alicante; European University of Madrid
- Occupation: Computer engineer; activist; politician

Teslem Andala Ubbi (Hassaniyya: تسلم عند الله أبي; born 30 May 1994), better known as Tesh Sidi (Hassaniyya: تسلم سيدي), is a Sahrawi-Spanish computer engineer and politician. An activist for Sahrawi independence, she was elected as a member of the Congress of Deputies in the 2023 Spanish general election for Madrid. She was elected as number three on Sumar's list in Madrid after being nominated by Más Madrid, which whom she had previously attempted to run with for the 2023 regional election.

She is the first woman of Sahrawi origin to serve in the Congress of Deputies, as well as the first Sahrawi to serve in parliament following the Spanish Transition.

== Early life and education ==
Tesh Sidi was born in the Sahrawi refugee camps located on Tindouf, Algeria on 30 May 1994. She was raised with her grandmother in Mauritania between the ages of four and seven following a Bedouin lifestyle, with her later returning to Tindouf. She moved to Alicante in the Valencian Community at the age of 12 to live with a foster family with whom she had already spent several summers, with her leaving her foster family at the age of 18 to work and study on her own.

She studied a degree in computer engineering at the University of Alicante in 2012 then, she moved to Madrid after graduating, finding work during the computing boom. She obtained a loan to pursue a Master in Big Data and Artificial Intelligence at the European University of Madrid, which she later finished.

== Early career ==
After the outbreak of the Western Saharan clashes in 2020 as part of the Western Sahara conflict, Tesh started to get more interested and aware about her origins and the Sahrawi cause and got involved in activism for the right to self-determination of the Sahrawi people, assuming the presidency of the Sahrawi Association in Madrid. She later created SaharawisToday, a digital communication platform specialized in the Sahrawi conflict.

Tesh Sidi participated in the 16th Congress of the POLISARIO Front as a congresswoman, in addition to covering the process for her media outlet. Tesh is not part of the leadership or militancy of the Polisario Front, but she still considers that the organization "represents all Sahrawis".

== Political career ==
Tesh joined Más Madrid's list as number 11 for the 2023 Madrilenian regional election. However, she was finally rejected by the Electoral Commission of Madrid due to a problem in the electoral census in which she appeared registered in Málaga instead of Madrid. Tesh justified herself by saying that she was registered "by mistake" in the Málaga register while trying to register her mother, who came to Spain after having an accident in which a wall fell and broke both her legs, also indicating that Citizen Services office in Madrid told her that her register in Madrid was correct.

She was later announced as number three on the lists of Sumar for Madrid on behalf of Más Madrid, in a move considered a nod to the pro-Sahrawi movement in Spain and Yolanda Díaz distancing herself from Pedro Sánchez's pro-Moroccan position. However, the candidate placed immediately ahead of her on the list, the career diplomat and former Spanish ambassador to the United Nations Agustín Santos Maraver, was strongly criticised by Sahrawi activists and the Polisario Front, who regarded him as pro-Moroccan due to his role, as chief of staff to foreign minister Miguel Ángel Moratinos, in pressuring Sahrawi activist Aminatou Haidar to end her 2009 hunger strike in Lanzarote. When asked about running immediately behind Santos Maraver, Sidi defended her candidacy by pointing to Sumar's common position in favour of Sahrawi self-determination through a referendum.

Upon her election, she became the first Sahrawi woman to be represented in the Congress of Deputies. Additionally, she became the first Sahrawi since the Spanish Transition; during the Francoist period, Sahrawis were represented in the Cortes Españolas. Her presence was criticized by the Moroccan press and celebrated by Polisario Front's delegate in Spain, Abdullah Arabi.

In 2025, Tesh Sidi criticized Rima Hassan, a French leftist serving as a member of the European Parliament, over her positions on the Western Sahara conflict. As an MP, Tesh Sidi has accused Madrid police of discriminatory conduct against LGBTQ people. Tesh Sidi has opposed Prime Minister Pedro Sánchez's approach to Morocco–Spain relations, arguing that his government has been too friendly towards Moroccan interests in the Western Sahara.

== Personal life ==
She obtained Spanish nationality in June 2022 after 20 years of uninterrupted residence in Spain. She stated that she had been an undocumented minor for three years while living with a Spanish family. Tesh also has the nationality of the Sahrawi Arab Democratic Republic, not recognized by Spain, which brought her administrative problems until her situation was regularized.

== Electoral history ==
Electoral history of Tesh Sidi
Election	List	Constituency	List position	Result
Madrilenian regional election, 2023	Más Madrid	Madrid	11th (of 135)	Disqualified
Spanish general election, 2023	Sumar	Madrid	3th (out of 37)	Elected
