= Hadjatu Aliat Swelm =

Sahrawi poet

- حجاتو عليات سويلم
- Born: 1973 (age 52–53); Sagir Valley, Western Sahara
- Occupation: Poet

Hadjatu Aliat Swelm (Arabic: حجاتو عليات سويلم; born 1973) is a Sahrawi poet, whose work examines the role of women in Sahrawi culture.

== Biography ==
Swelm was born in the Sagir Valley, Western Sahara. She has written poetry throughout her life, mostly political work which was first and has subsequently been published under a pseudonym. In 1999, the publication of a poem she wrote about 66 political prisoners led to Moroccan authorities finding out her identity and a loss of her anonymity. After a rising number of police raids on her home and family, she moved to Aosserd camp, in order to protect her family from Moroccan authorities. Her poetry focuses on the role of women within the Sahrawi struggle. Both she and the poet Hossein Moulud have written about life at the Gdeim Izik protest camp.

Swelm's work was first translated to English by the writers Sam Berkson and Mohamed Sulaiman, in their volume of Sahrawi Poetry Settled Wanderers.
