= Gâra Djebilet mine =

Iron mine in Algeria

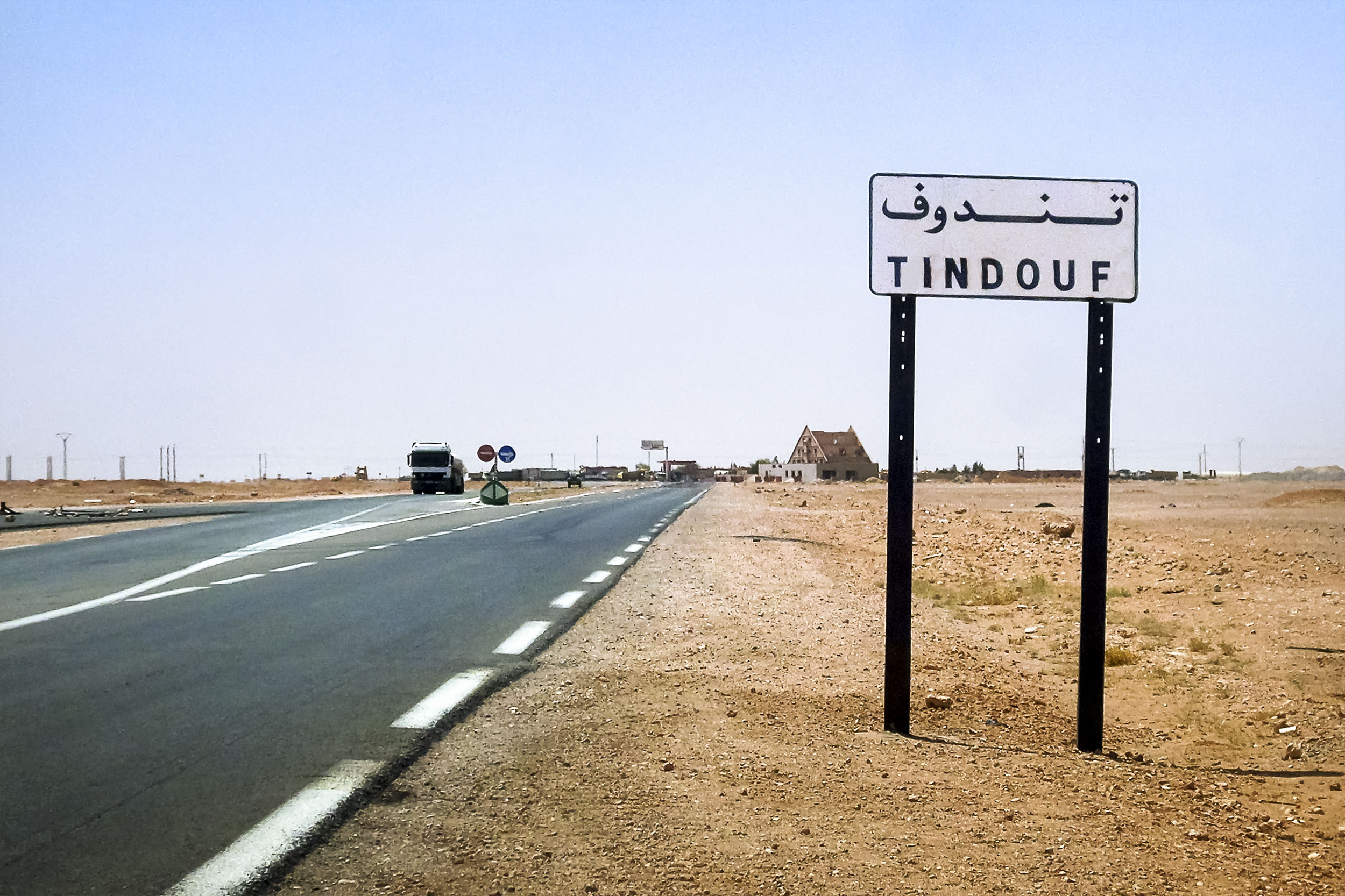
- Entrance to the city of Tindouf

- Location within Algeria Location within Africa
- Location: Tindouf, Tindouf Province, Algeria; 26.73518°N 7.46779°W
- Products: Iron ore
- Type: Iron mine
- Discovered: 1952
- Opened: 2022

The Gâra Djebilet mine is an iron mine located in Tindouf Province in western Algeria. It represents one of the largest iron ore reserves in the world. Its reserves are estimated at 3.5 billion tons, of which 1.7 billion tons are exploitable.

== History ==
The Gâra Djebilet mine was discovered in 1952 by the French geologist Pierre Gevin.

On March 12, 2017, the National Iron and Steel Company (Feraal) signed a Memorandum of understanding with the Chinese company Sinosteel Equipment & Engineering to carry out feasibility studies for the development of the deposit. The contract also includes the performance by Chinese research centers of dephosphorization and enrichment tests on four different processes. In 2015, Algerian laboratories were able to achieve a dephosphorization rate of around 0.1%.

Its operation is formalized on July 30, 2022. A 950km rail connection has been built to connect the mine to Béchar.

== Characteristics ==
The Gâra Djebilet deposit extends over 131 km^{2} (51 sq mi), its exploitable reserves are estimated at 3.5 billion tons of ore with a content of 58.57% iron.

The industrial exploitation of Gâra Djebilet ore begins in 2022 with a planned production of 2 to 3 million tonnes of ore per year in a first stage (2022–2025), then 40 to 50 million tonnes/year from 2026. The project will position Algeria as a leader in the African steel and metallurgical industry.

Some experts have doubted the profitability of the project, Gâra Djebilet being characterized by a high content of phosphorus present in the iron, requiring to obtain a quality ore, an operation called dephosphorization, which is expensive and complex.
