= Algeria–Mauritania relations =

- Algeria: Mauritania

Algeria–Mauritania relations refer to the bilateral relations between Algeria and Mauritania. The two countries share a 460 km border and generally maintain friendly relations.

However, the two countries have experienced periods of political tension in the past. During the Western Sahara War (1975–1991), Mauritania and Morocco partitioned and occupied Western Sahara, while Algeria opposed the arrangement and supported the Polisario Front. Mauritania later renounced its territorial claims to Western Sahara, and relations with Algeria subsequently normalized.

Algeria maintains an embassy in Nouakchott, while Mauritania maintains an embassy in Algiers.

== History ==
=== Mauritanian Independence ===
Algeria supported Mauritania in the 1960s against Moroccan territorial claims, and in the early 1970s helped it leave the franc-zone and establish a national currency. Algeria also gave technical, cultural, and economic aid. Good relations ended in 1974 in clear alliance of Mauritanian interests with Morocco. Mauritania broke relations over Algerian recognition of the SDAR.

== Current relations ==
Both countries have been aiming to work and collaborate while trying not to anger Morocco, who is Algeria's fierce rival but Mauritania's important economic investor. Algeria is expanding their investments to Mauritania to counter Moroccan influence. Morocco has expressed their concerns over the ties between two nations.

In 2019, Algerian exports to Mauritania amounted to 1.4% of Mauritanian imports.

On 8 April 2021, the SAN Express «Sète-Algiers-Nouakchott» regular shipping line between the French port of Sète and the capital cities of Algiers and Nouakchott was opened, supervised by the Algerian company «AnisFer Line». The total rotation time is 20 days.
