= Baya El Hachemi =

Algerian-Swiss director and social activist

- Born: Baya El Hachemi; 1966 (age 59–60); Algiers, Algeria
- Education: University of Quebec (B.A.)
- Occupations: Director, producer, journalist
- Years active: 1977–present
- Notable work: El Maktoub and El Qada Wa El Qadar

Baya El Hachemi, is an Algerian–Swiss director, producer and journalist. She is best known as the director of the television serials El Maktoub and El Qada Wa El Qadar. She also was an activist for the independence of Algeria.

== Personal life ==
She settled in Quebec in 2005. Meanwhile, she completed her bachelor's degree in literary studies at the University of Quebec in Montreal. Then she got involved in several organizations, such as "Halte la Ressource".

== Career ==
She is often known as the "first and foremost a journalist on the Algerian radio". In 1975, she made the serial Faces of Women which telecasted until 1977. Then as a producer, she made El Maktoub, and El Qada Wa El Qadar in 2003 and El Qilada, and Tahaddi Imraae in 2014. With the guidance of Minister of Culture, Nadia Labidi, Baya created the platform La maison de l'artiste ("The artist's house"). In 2003, she made the television serial Destiny. In the same year, she started her film which was based on National Liberation War and the events occurred between 1932 and independence of Algeria. In 2007, she made the documentary film Mamya Chentouf: Activist of the First Hour based on the life of Mamia Chentouf, the first Parisian woman journalist.

== Filmography ==
Year	Film	Role	Genre	Ref.
1977	Visages de femmes	Director	TV movie	
1983	Citoyen face à la justice	Director	TV movie	
1995	El techo del mundo	Assistant director	Film	
2003	El Maktoub	Producer	TV serial	
2003	El Qada Wa El Qadar	Producer	TV serial	
2014	El Qilada	Director	TV serial	
2014	Tahaddi Imraae	Director	TV serial	
