= Chegga =

Chegga Cheggat
- Location in Mauritania
- Coordinates: 25°22′23.89″N 5°47′14.12″W
- Country: Mauritania
- Region: Tiris Zemmour
- Elevation: 370 m (1,200 ft)

Population
  - Total: 0
- Time zone: UTC0

Chegga is an abandoned fort in the far northeastern part of Mauritania, close to the borders with Algeria and Mali. It has been a caravan stop for centuries. There are neolithic rock carvings in the oued 500 meters away from the fort, near a water source.

Chegga consists of a mosque and a military fort. It was built by the French Foreign Legion and taken over by the Army of Mauritania after independence.

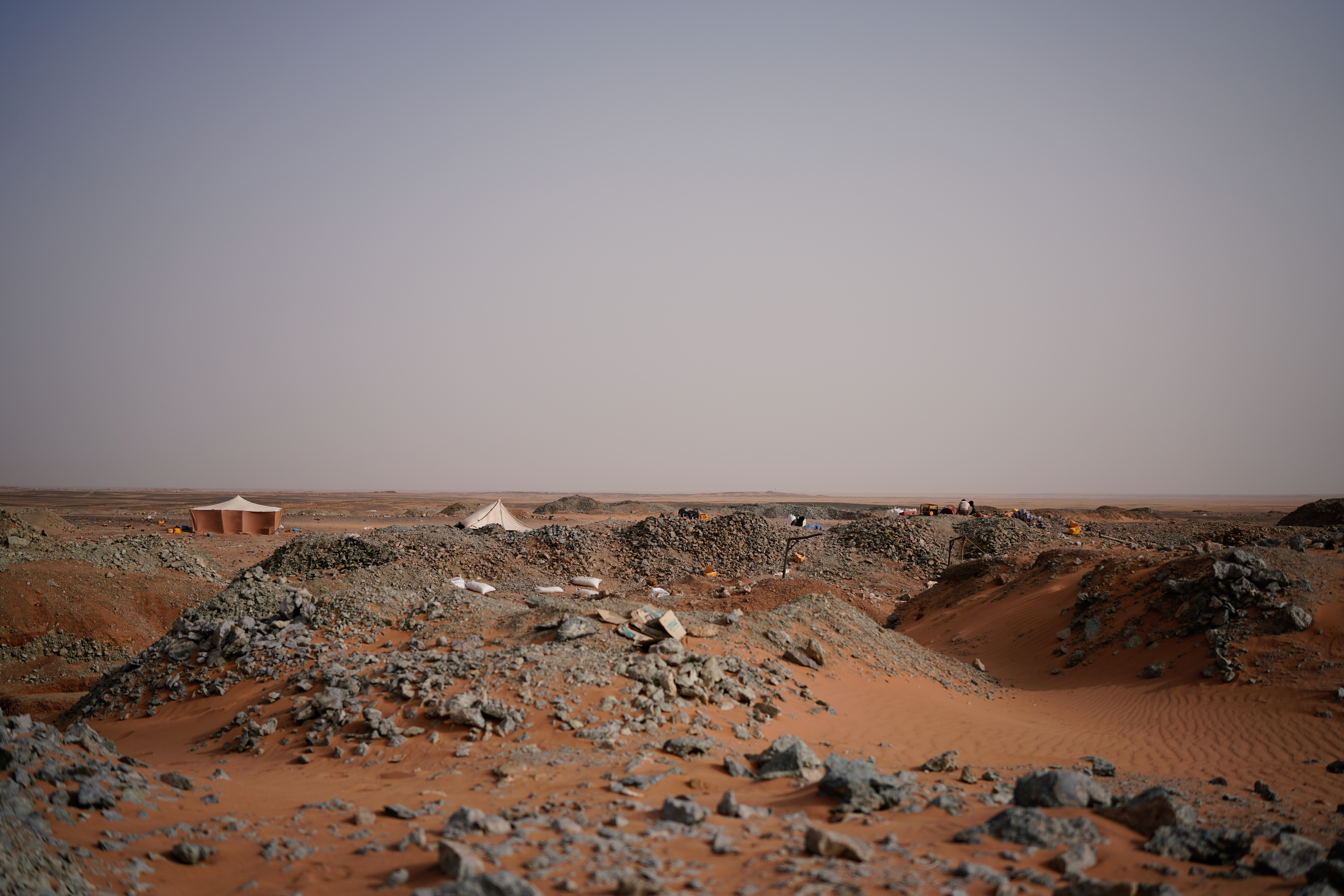
A view of artisanal mining near Chegga

In 2019, president Mohamed Ould Ghazouani, opened the surrounding military exclusion zone to prospecting on a limited basis, although technically foreigners can still be shot on sight. Chegga has since become a center of artisanal gold mining by Mauritanians and Malians using hand tools.

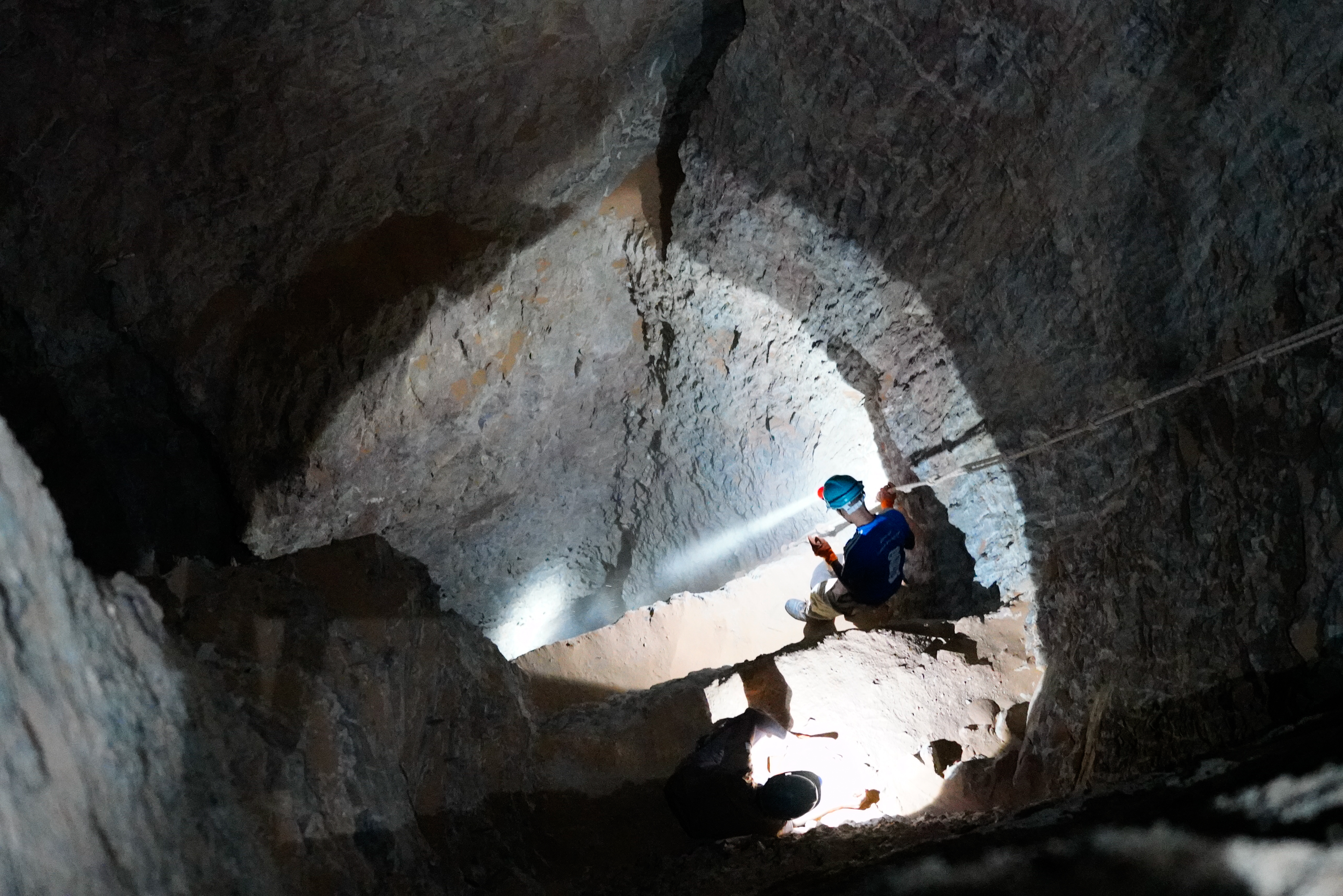
An artisanal miner working in a mine near Chegga
