= Nazha El Khalidi =

Sahrawi journalist and activist

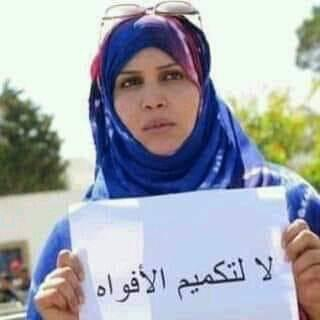
El-Khalidi in 2018

Nazha El-Khalidi (Laayoune, Western Sahara, 27 December 1991) is a Sahrawi journalist and activist.

On 21 August 2016, she was arrested at Fem Lwad beach by the Gendarmerie Royale after recording a demonstration in support of Western Sahara's self-determination. She was working for Western Sahara's television.

On 4 December 2018, she was arrested again after broadcasting another demonstration via Facebook, being judged on 20 May 2019.
