= Najla Mohamed-Lamin =

Sahrawi human rights activist (born 1989)

Najla Mohamed-Lamin (Arabic: نجلاء محمد الأمين; born 1989) is a Sahrawi human rights activist and teacher who focuses on women's rights and environment issues. She established the Almasar Library Centre, which educates women and children living in Sahrawi refugee camps about climate change.

== Biography ==
Mohamed-Lamin's family originally came from Al Mahbes, Western Sahara, but fled the country following the outbreak of the Western Sahara War in 1975 between the Polisario Front, of which many of Mohamed-Lamin's relatives were members of, and the Royal Moroccan Army. Mohamed-Lamin was born and raised in Smara, the largest of the Sahrawi refugee camps in Tindouf Province, Algeria, and was one of twelve children.

Mohamed-Lamin went to school in Smara, but was forced to drop out at the age of 14 when her mother became unwell. Mohamed-Lamin grew up speaking Arabic, and also learned Spanish due to Western Sahara's previous status as a Spanish colony. When she was 17, the Essalam English Centre opened in Smara, and she subsequently became fluent in English. Mohamed-Lamin worked occasionally as an interpreter for Spanish- and English-speaking delegations visiting the camps.

Some of these delegates subsequently organised a fundraiser to support Mohamed-Lamin with her goal of being educated abroad, and she subsequently went to Whatcom Community College in Bellingham, Washington, where she studied sustainable development and women's studies. She graduated in 2018 with an associate of applied science transfer degree.

Mohamed-Lamin became politically active as a teenager, becoming a member of the Sahrawi Youth Union and representing the organisation abroad, including at the Sweden Social Democrats youth wing's 38th Congress in 2015, during which Stefan Löfven, the then-Prime Minister of Sweden, reiterated the country's support of Sahrawi self-determination. During her time studying in the United States, Mohamed-Lamin served as the vice president of the Sahrawi Association of the United States.

Upon graduating from university and returning to Smara, Mohamed-Lamin founded the Almasar Library Centre, with the goal of educating Sahrawi women and children on environmental issues. In addition, it has also provided resources for early childhood learning, including reading facilities, as well as women's health clinics, including breast cancer screenings. Through Almasar, Mohamed-Lamin supported over 200, 000 refugees with addressing issues of water and food insecurity in response to climate change in the Sahara.

In addition to her environmental activism, Mohamed-Lamin supported Sahrawi self-determination. She criticised Western countries and their media outlets for their silence on issues facing Western Sahara following the end of the 1991 ceasefire between the Polisario Front and Morocco in 2020, especially compared to other conflicts, such as the Russian invasion of Ukraine. Mohamed-Lamin's brothers and father joined the Sahrawi People's Liberation Army following the end of the ceasefire, and her brother was the sole survivor of a Moroccan drone attack in a refugee camp in November 2022. Mohamed-Lamin criticised countries that traded with Morocco exports that originally came from Western Saharan land, including writing an open letter to New Zealand about their purchase of phosphate rock from the Moroccan government. Mohamed-Lamin has called on Morocco to honour the 1991 Settlement Plan, which promised a referendum for Sahrawi people around Western Sahara becoming an autonomous part of Morocco or an independent state; she stated that Sahrawis do not wish to be Moroccan and described Sahrawi culture as unique from that of Morocco. Mohamed-Lamin identified a prominent role for women to play in the establishment of an independent West Saharan state, citing their leading roles in the establishment and maintenance of refugee camps since 1975.

As of 2023, Mohamed-Lamin continues to live in the Smara camp with her children.

== Recognition ==
Mohamed-Lamin's articles have been published internationally by The National Interest and Stuff.

In 2023, she was named by the BBC as one of its 100 Women in recognition of her activism for women and environmental rights.
