= Sahrawi refugees =

Indigenous North African ethnic group

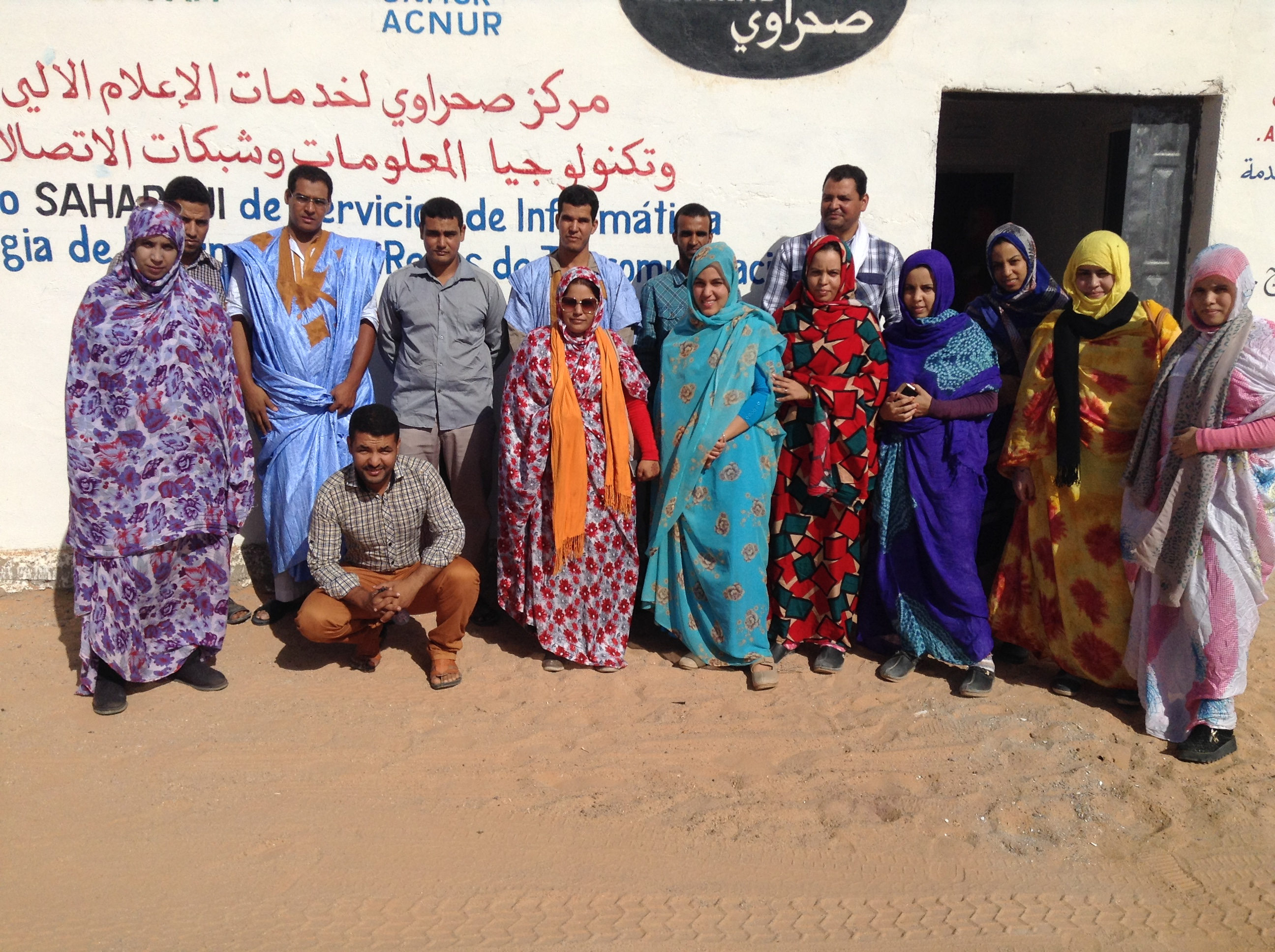
- Sahrawi refugees in Tindouf camp, Algeria

Regions with significant populations
- Algeria: c. 90,000
- Mauritania: c. 26,000

Languages
- Hassaniya Arabic and Spanish

Religion
- Sunni Islam

Related ethnic groups
- Sahrawis

Sahrawi refugees refer to the refugees of the Western Sahara War (1975–1991) and their descendants, who are still mostly populating the Sahrawi refugee camps in Tindouf, Algeria.

== History ==
The biggest concentration of Sahrawi refugees was created in 1975–76, when Sahrawi refugees were fleeing from Moroccan forces, who advanced through Western Sahara during the Western Sahara War between Morocco and Sahrawi Polisario Front. Those refugees ended up in Sahrawi refugee camps in the Tindouf Province, Algeria. With most refugees still living in the camps, the refugee situation is among the most protracted ones worldwide.

Thousands of ethnic Sahrawi refugees from Western Sahara also fled to Mauritania to escape the war, which began when Morocco annexed Western Sahara in 1976. Uncertainty about the political future of Western Sahara deterred the ethnic Sahrawi refugees from returning home.

Since the creation of the Sahrawi refugee problem in the 1970s, a significant number of Sahrawi refugees have tried to upgrade their status, by leaving the refugee camps in Tindouf and the northern villages in Mauritania. Some chose to immigrate to Europe, as part of the general migration wave from Africa, while others dispersed in Mauritania.

== Demographics ==
=== Algeria ===
The number of Sahrawi refugees in Tindouf camps is disputed and politically sensitive. Morocco argues that Polisario and Algeria overestimate the numbers to attract political attention and foreign aid, while Polisario accuses Morocco of attempting to restrict human aid as a means of pressure on civilian refugee populations. The refugees' numbers will also be important in determining their political weight in the possible event of a referendum to determine Western Sahara's future status.

Algerian authorities have estimated the number of Sahrawi refugees in Algeria to be 165,000. This has been supported by Polisario, although the movement recognizes that some refugees have rebased to Mauritania, a country that houses about 26,000 Sahrawis refugees. United Nations High Commissioner for Refugees (UNHCR) referred to Algeria's figure for many years, but in 2005 concern about it being inflated led the organization to reduce its working figure to 90,000 based on satellite imagery analysis. UNHCR is in dialogue with the Algerian Government and the Sahrawi refugee leadership, seeking to conduct a census to determine the exact number of refugees in the camps.

In 1998, UN's MINURSO mission identified 42,378 voting-age adults in the camps, counting only those who had contacted the mission's registration offices and subsequently been able to prove their descent from pre-1975 Western Sahara. No attempt was made to estimate the total population number in the camps.

The Moroccan government contends that the total number of refugees is around 45,000 to 50,000, and also that these people are kept in the camps by Polisario against their will.

The exact number of Sahrawi refugees in Algeria is unknown; however, there have been many estimates. The UNHCR "vulnerable refugees" in 2005 estimated 90,000. The UNHCR estimated 155,000 prior to 2005. 90,000 estimated by the CIA world Factbook. 165,000 claimed by the Polisario and Algerian government. 45,000–50,000 claimed by the Moroccan government. 25,000–40,000 claimed by the Dissident former Polisario officials.

=== Mauritania ===
The UNHCR and other humanitarian assistance agencies had virtually no contact with those refugees. Most lived in the northern town of Zouérat and the coastal town of Nouadhibou on Mauritania's northern border.

By the end of 2003, there were more than 26,000 registered Sahrawi refugees in Mauritania. They formed a majority of people with refugee status in the whole Mauritania.

=== Western Sahara ===
The Sahrawis who did not flee have been given Moroccan citizenship. Following the 1975 Green March, the Moroccan state has sponsored settlement schemes enticing thousands of Moroccans to move into the Moroccan-occupied part of Western Sahara (80% of the territory). By 2015, it was estimated that Moroccan settlers made up at least two-thirds of the 500,000 inhabitants.

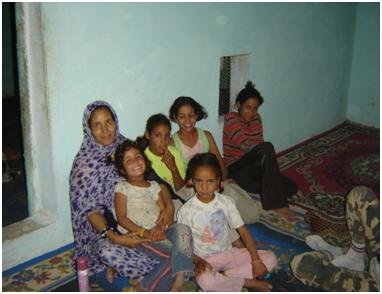
A Sahrawi refugee family

== Humanitarian aid ==
The ECHO (European Commission – Humanitarian Aid and Civil Protection) allocated in 2013 some 10 million Euro for the purposes of improving living conditions of Sahrawi refugees. ECHO has so far donated nearly 200 million Euro for that purpose, beginning from 1993.

The European Commission refers to the Sahrawi refugees as the "forgotten refugees".

== See also ==
- Sahrawi refugee camps
