= Sahrawi refugee camps =

Collection of refugee camps set up in the Tindouf Province, Algeria

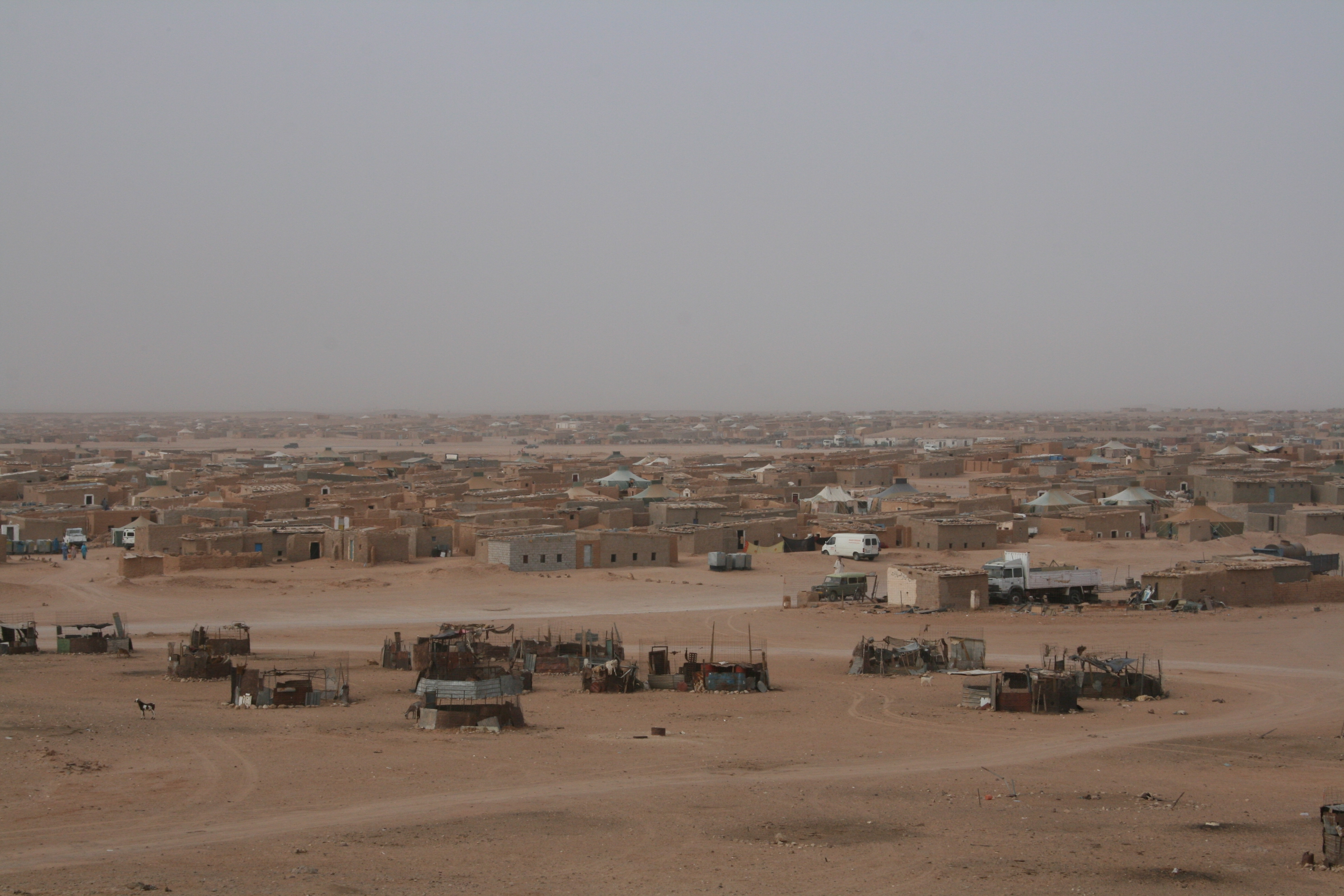
Refugee camp in Tindouf, 2009.

The Sahrawi refugee camps (Arabic: مخيمات اللاجئين الصحراويين; Spanish: Campamentos de refugiados saharauis), also known as the Tindouf camps, are a collection of refugee camps set up in the Tindouf Province, Algeria, in 1975–1976 for Sahrawi refugees fleeing from Moroccan forces, who advanced through Western Sahara during the Western Sahara War. With most of the original refugees still living in the camps, the situation is among the most protracted in the world.

The limited opportunities for self-reliance in the harsh desert environment have forced the refugees to rely on international humanitarian assistance for their survival. However, the Tindouf camps differ from the majority of refugee camps in the level of self-organization. Most affairs and camp life organization are run by the refugees themselves, with little outside interference.

The camps are divided into five wilayat (districts) named after towns in Western Sahara; El Aaiun, Awserd, Smara, Dakhla and more recently Cape Bojador (or the daira of Bojador). In addition, there is a smaller satellite camp known as "February 27", surrounding a boarding school for women, and an administrative camp called Rabouni. The encampments are spread out over a quite large area. While Laayoune, Smara, Awserd, February 27 and Rabouni all lie within an hour's drive of the Algerian city of Tindouf, the Dakhla camp lies 170 kilometres (110 mi) to the southeast. The camps are also the headquarters of the 6th military region of the Saharawi Arab Democratic Republic.

== Administration and public service institutions ==
Map of the camps close to Tindouf. Not shown: Dakhla.

The refugee camps are governed by Polisario, being administratively part of the Sahrawi Arab Democratic Republic (SADR). SADR's government in exile and administration are located in the Rabouni camp.

The Tindouf camps are divided into administrative sub-units electing their own officials to represent the neighborhoods in political decision-making. Each of the four wilayat (districts) are divided into six or seven daïras (villages), which are in turn divided into hays or barrios (neighborhoods).

Local committees distribute basic goods, water and food, while "daïra" authorities made up by the representatives of the "hays" organize schools, cultural activities and medical services. Some argue that this results in a form of basic democracy on the level of camp administration, and that this has improved the efficiency of aid distribution. Women are active on several levels of administration, and UNHCR has appraised their importance in camp administration and social structures.

Algeria does not intervene in their organization. While the Algerian military has a significant presence in the nearby city of Tindouf, Algeria insists that responsibility for human rights in the camps lies with the Polisario.

Camp residents are subject to the Constitution and laws of SADR. A local justice system, with courts and prisons, is administered by Polisario. Local qadis (sharia judges) have jurisdiction over personal status and family law issues.

Polisario has prioritized education from the beginning, and the local authorities have established 29 preschools, 31 primary and seven secondary schools, the academic institutions of ‘27 February’ and ‘12 October’ as well as various technical training centers (without forgetting that Tindouf campements count 90.000 refugees) . While teaching materials are still scarce, the literacy rate has increased from about 5% at the formation of the camps to 90% in 1995. Children's education is obligatory, and several thousands have received university educations in Algeria, Cuba and Spain as part of aid packages.

The camps have 27 clinics, a central hospital and four regional hospitals.

Men perform military service in the armed forces of the SADR. During the war years, at least some women were enrolled in auxiliary units guarding the refugee camps.

In April 2026, reports indicated that the United States of America asked the Algerian government to dismantle the Sahrawi camps.

== Population numbers ==
The number of Sahrawi refugees in Tindouf camps is disputed and politically sensitive. Morocco argues that Polisario and Algeria overestimate the numbers to attract political attention and foreign aid, while Polisario accuses Morocco of attempting to restrict human aid as a means of pressure on civilian refugee populations. The refugees' numbers will also be important in determining their political weight in the possible event of a referendum to determine Western Sahara's future status.

Algerian authorities have estimated the number of Sahrawi refugees in Algeria to be 165,000. This has been supported by Polisario, although the movement recognizes that some refugees have rebased to Mauritania, a country that houses about 26,000 Sahrawi refugees. UNHCR referred to Algeria's figure for many years, but in 2005 concern about it being inflated led the organization to reduce its working figure to 90,000 based on satellite imagery analysis. UNHCR is in dialogue with the Algerian Government and the Sahrawi refugee leadership, seeking to conduct a census to determine the exact number of refugees in the camps.

In 1998, UN's Minurso mission identified 42,378 voting-age adults in the camps, counting only those who had contacted the mission's registration offices and subsequently been able to prove their descent from pre-1975 Western Sahara. No attempt was made to estimate the total population number in the camps.

The Moroccan government contends that the total number of refugees is around 45,000 to 50,000, and also that these people are kept in the camps by Polisario against their will. However, the Central Intelligence Agency notes that there are about 100,000 refugees in Algerian-sponsored camps near the town of Tindouf alone.

== Living conditions ==
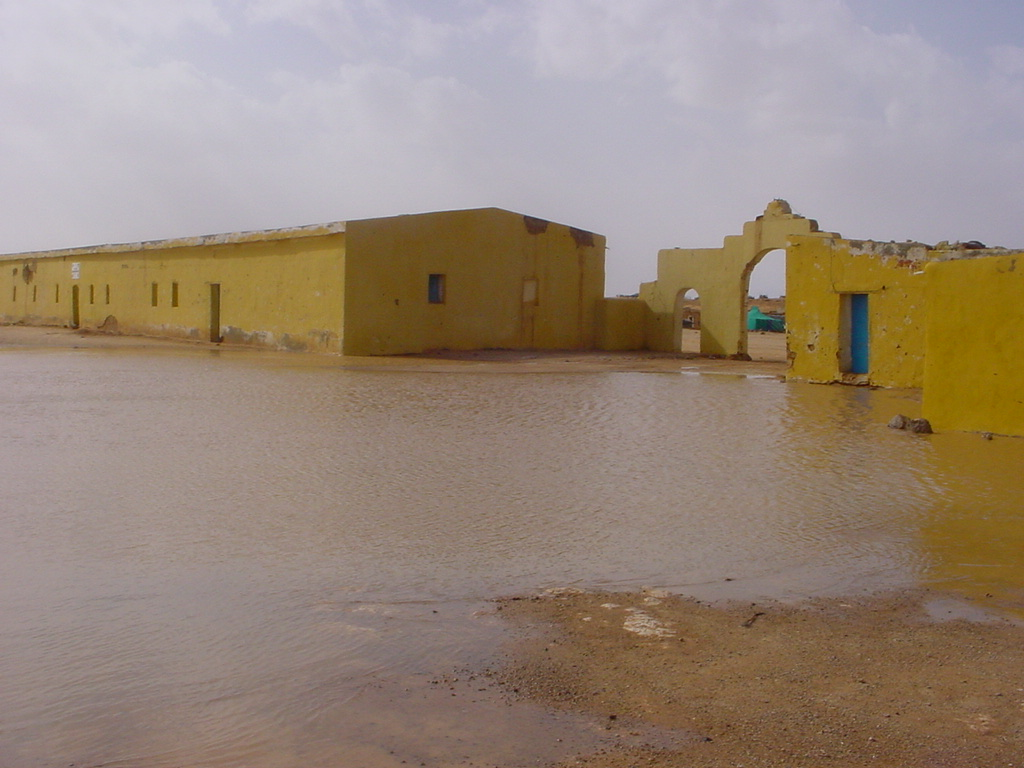
View of the 27 February camp after the floods that devastated the camps in February 2006

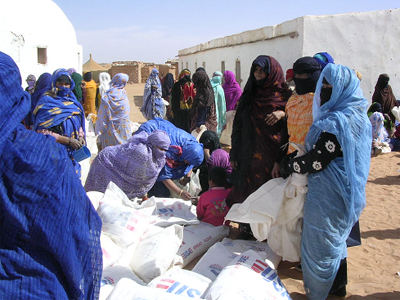
"USAID-supplied bread flour being distributed to mothers and children in Dakhla refugee camp. (January 18–25, 2004)

The Tindouf area is located on the hammada, a vast desert plain of the Sahara Desert. Summer temperatures in this part of the hammada, historically known as "The Devil's Garden", are often above 50°C and frequent sandstorms disrupt normal life. There is little or no vegetation, and firewood has to be gathered by car tens of kilometers away. Only a few of the camps have access to water, and the drinking sources are neither clean nor sufficient for the entire refugee population. Basic life cannot be sustained in this environment, and the camps are completely dependent on foreign aid.

Food, drinking water, building materials and clothing are brought in by car by international aid agencies. Basic food is brought in from the port of Oran to Rabouni by the World Food Programme (WFP) in collaboration with Algerian Red Crescent (ARC) and the Algerian government, while food distribution from Rabouni is organized by Polisario in collaboration with Western Sahara Red Crescent (WSRC). With the rise of a basic market economy, some refugees have been able to acquire television sets and use cars; several hundred satellite dishes have popped up in recent years.

The refugee population is plagued by the lack of vegetables, nutritious food and medicines. According to the United Nations and the World Food Programme, 40% of the children suffer from lack of iron, and 10% of the children below five years of age suffer from acute lack of nutrition. 32% are suffering from chronic lack of nutrition. 47% of the women suffer from lack of iron.

Heavy flash rains and floods destroyed much of the camps in February 2006, prompting a crisis response from the UNHCR and the World Food Program (WFP), to replace destroyed housing with tents and provide food to cover for lost storages.

The WFP has repeatedly expressed its concern over a shortage of donations, and warned of dire health consequences if needs are not met. The UNHCR warned in early 2007 that demands were not being met in the Sahrawi camps, and that malnutrition was severe. Refugees International has noted that the situation is especially precarious in Dakhla, the most inaccessible of the camps.

In October 2015, heavy rainfalls flooded the refugee camps again, destroying houses (made of sand-bricks), tents and food provisions. More than 11,000 families were affected.

The European Commission refers to the Sahrawi refugees as the "forgotten refugees".

== Women's role ==
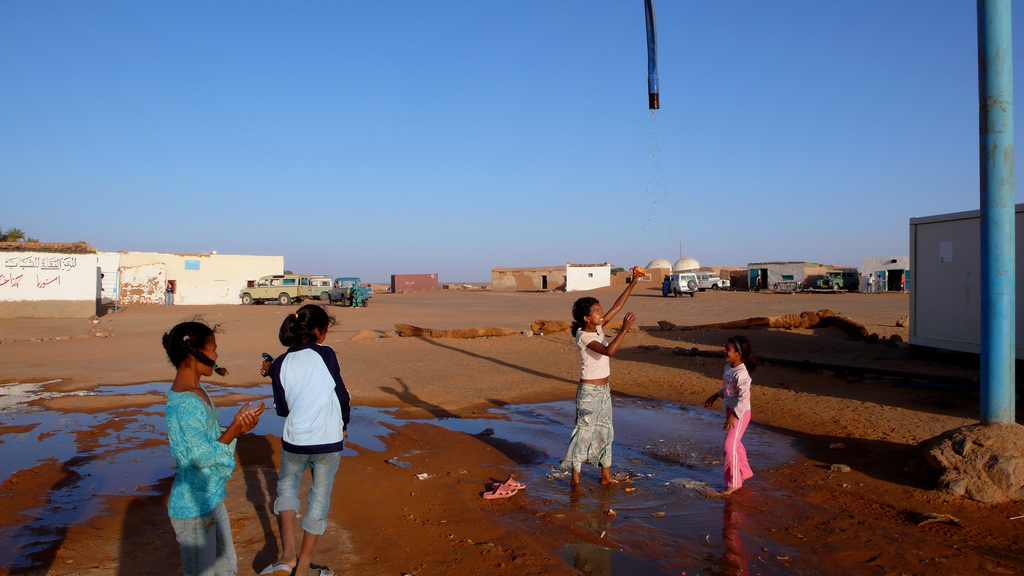
Children at a Sahrawi camp in southwest Algeria.

Polisario has attempted to modernize the camps' society, through emphasis on education, eradication of tribalism and emancipation of women.

The role of Sahrawi women was central already in pre-colonial and colonial life, but was strengthened further during the war years (1975–1991), when Sahrawi women ran most of the camps' administration, while the men were fighting at the front. This, together with literacy and professional education classes, produced major advances in the role of women in Sahrawi society. The return of large numbers of Sahrawi men since the cease fire in 1991 may have slowed this development according to some observers, but women still run a majority of the camps' administration, and the Sahrawi women's union UNMS is very active in promoting their role.

Two women who had been residents of the camps however claimed that women in the refugee camps are deprived of their fundamental rights and are victims of exclusion and sexual aggression.

== Work and economy ==
While there are several international organizations (ECHO, WFP, Oxfam, UNHCR, etc.) working in the camps, the Polisario has insisted on using mainly local staff for construction, teaching etc. It argues that this will help activate the refugee population, to avoid a sense of stagnation and hopelessness after 30 years in exile. However, jobs remain scarce and those Sahrawis educated at universities abroad can rarely if ever find opportunities to use their skills. Some Sahrawis work in nearby Tindouf city.

A simple monetary economy began developing in the camps during the 1990s, after Spain decided to pay pensions to Sahrawis who had been forcibly drafted as soldiers in the Tropas Nómadas during the colonial time. Money also came from Sahrawis working in Algeria or abroad, and from refugees who pursue a traditional bedouin and Tuareg lifestyle, herding cattle in Algeria, Mauritania and the Polisario-liberated areas of Western Sahara. The private economy however remains very limited, and the camps continue to survive mainly on foreign and Algerian aid.

== Family separation and human rights ==
Since the Polisario Front and Morocco are still at war, visits between the camps and the Moroccan-controlled parts of Western Sahara are virtually impossible, with the Moroccan Wall hindering movement through Western Sahara, and the Algeria–Morocco border closed added to the restriction on movement by the Polisario on the camps population. Thousands of families have been separated for up to 30 years, a painful situation for the population in both Western Sahara and the refugee camps. In 2004, UNHCR managed a family visits exchange program for five-day visits for a limited number of people, going from the camps to the Moroccan-held territories and vice versa. The United Nations has also established telephone and mail services between the camps and Moroccan-held Western Sahara.

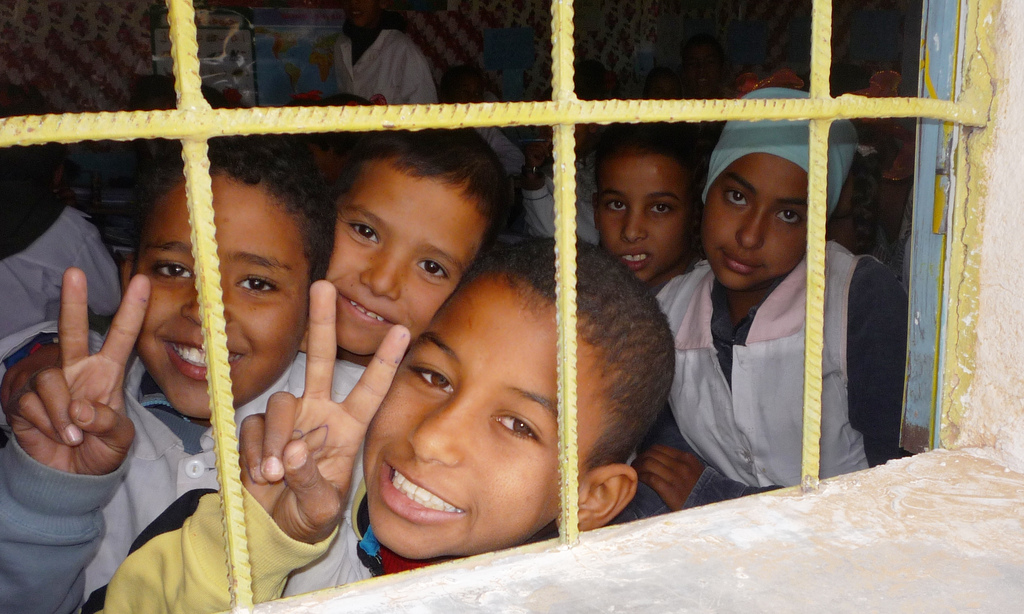
Sahrawi refugee students.

While Polisario complains of repression of Sahrawi human rights activists in the Moroccan-held parts of Western Sahara; the government of Morocco, dissident groups inside Polisario, as well as former members of Polisario, have claimed that the refugee camps occasionally are the scene of human rights abuse against the refugee population by the Polisario.

The Polisario Front has acknowledged reports of mistreatment in the seventies and eighties, but deny the accusations of on-going abuse. Reports of beatings and torture, in many cases leading to death, of Moroccan prisoners of war who were formerly held in the camps were backed by some human rights organizations, which seems to have contributed to the release of the last of these prisoners by the summer of 2005. There are complaints of limitations on movement between the camps, with Morocco describing them as completely shut off from the outside world, but camp authorities maintain that this is untrue, and that they are simply engaged in registering movements for aid allocation purposes. Visiting human rights organizations have concluded that the conditions are troublesome with regard to basic subsistence, but that the human rights situation is satisfactory.

An OHCHR (United Nations' human rights monitors) visit to both Moroccan-controlled Western Sahara and the Tindouf refugee camps in 2006 documented no complaints of human rights abuse in the camps, but stressed the need for more information. However, the report, which severely criticized Moroccan conduct in Western Sahara, was slammed as biased and partisan by the Moroccan government. In April 2010, the Sahrawi government had called the UN to supervise human rights in the liberated territories and refugee camps, stating that "We are ready to fully cooperate with UN human rights observers in the territory under our control. The United Nations should take this proposal seriously, and ask Morocco to do likewise".

== 2011 NGO foreign workers abduction ==
On 23 October 2011, three European humanitarian aid workers were kidnapped in the Rabuni, the administrative center of the refugee camps. The three hostages were two Spanish citizens (Enric Gonyalons and Ainhoa Fernández de Rincón) and an Italian woman (Rossella Urru); all members of humanitarian NGOs. During the abduction, Enric Gonyalons and a Sahrawi guard were wounded by the attackers, who according to POLISARIO sources came from Mali.

At first, Brahim Ghali, SADR ambassador in Algiers, said that Al-Qaeda Organization in the Islamic Maghreb (AQMI) was responsible for this incident. Mauritanian and Malian security sources also pointed to AQMI as perpetrators of the kidnapping.

On 26 October, Algerian Army forces killed four AQMI members, suspects of the kidnappings.

The kidnapping was widely condemned internationally, for example by the African Commission on Human and Peoples' Rights or the European Union.

They were set free by the Movement for Oneness and Jihad in West Africa (MOJWA) in Gao, Mali on the 18th of July 2012, being transferred to Burkina Faso and later to Spain.

== Impact ==
Poets Hadjatu Aliat Swelm and Hussein Moulud have written about life at the Gdeim Izik protest camp. Najla Mohamed-Lamin was recognized as one of the BBC's 100 women in 2023.

== See also ==
- History of Western Sahara
- The five cities in Western Sahara that give name to the refugee camps:
  - Dakhla, El-Aaiun, Smara, Awserd, Cape Bojador
- Independence Intifada (Western Sahara)
