= Algerian Red Crescent =

Algerian humanitarian volunteer organization

- Algerian Red Crescent symbol
- Formation: 1957
- Type: Aid agency
- Legal status: Foundation
- Purpose: Humanitarian aid
- Headquarters: Algiers, Algeria
- Region served: Algeria
- President: Ibtissem Hamlaoui
- Website: Official website

The Algerian Red Crescent (Arabic: جمعية الهلال الأحمر الجزائري, romanized: Jamʻīyat al-Hilāl al-Aḥmar al-Jazāʼirī) is an Algerian humanitarian volunteer organization founded in 1957. It has been recognized by the International Red Cross and Red Crescent Movement only since 1963.

== History ==
The Algerian Red Crescent society was born out of the preliminary humanitarian missions by the Internal Committee of the Red Cross (ICRC) during the Algerian War of 1954–1962. Although the colonial French government did provide Algerian students with education in regards to human rights, they did not have explicit access to these rights in certain politically motivated situations.

The need for the International Committee of the Red Cross was represented in their first mission on February 1, 1955, when the organization send aid to detainees and their families, who were experiencing human rights violations and mistreatment during their incarceration. During this time, joined by a medical professional, the ICRC conducted meetings with prison inmates and staff in regards to the condition of sanitary facilities, dorms and kitchens, as well as investigations into medical treatment and healthcare. The success of this mission brought relief, supplies, recommendations and set a precedent for the ICRC to return again from May 12 – June 28, 1956, to visit 61 internment camps, where they found evidence of torture and misconduct. These findings were important to the January 10, 1957 establishment of the Algerian Red Crescent, as a more consistent presence was needed in Algiers to monitor human rights in detention centres. The organization was actually first established in two locations, Tangier, Morocco and Tunis, Tunisia, where the leadership of the National Liberation Front (NLF) were living in exile. Mamia Chentouf was one of the founders in Tunis. Following its establishment, the Algerian Red Crescent aided the ICRC in providing aid to the forty thousand refugees in neighbouring Morocco, as a result of their newly granted independence on March 2, 1956.

== Algerian Red Crescent missions ==
Since the formation of the Algerian Red Crescent in 1957, the organization has remained active in providing humanitarian assistance throughout Algeria. As Pierre Gaillard remarked from his personal experience with the Algerian Red Crescent when an Israeli plane from the airline El Al was hijacked to Algiers in 1962, the Algerian Red Crescent was active in receiving the ICRC delegate as well as directing those responsible for prosecution, effectively preserving the safety of Algerians.

More recently, on October 18, 2008, the Algerian Red Crescent responded to a catastrophic mudslide in the region of Ghardaïa that resulted in a dozen casualties, as well as the displacement of over one thousand Algerians. Over four-hundred and fifty Algerian Red Crescent members contributed to the relief effort by evacuating civilians, providing first aid and distributing emergency relief including temporary housing, water purification tablets, sanitary supplies, blankets, kitchen utensils, basic health care and psychological support programs.

On June 3, 2016, the organization provided five hundred parcels of nutritional aid to the communities of Tizi Mahdi, Bouaichoune, Bouchrahil, and Guelb El Kebir in the Wilaya de Médea region after the already socially-stratified sub-village settlements (Hameaux) were hit by an earthquake.

== Sources ==
- Perret, Françoise; Bugnion, François (30 September 2011). "Between insurgents and government: the International Committee of the Red Cross's action in the Algerian War (1954–1962) - ICRC". www.icrc.org.
