= Tindouf Province =

Province of Algeria

Tindouf Province ولاية تندوف
- Province
- Map of Algeria highlighting Tindouf
- Coordinates: 27°41′N 8°8′W
- Country: Algeria
- Capital: Tindouf

Area
  - Total: 159,000 km^{2} (61,000 sq mi)

Population (2008)
  - Total: 160,000 (disputed); 58,193 Algerians approx. 100,000 Sahrawis (Note: Sahrawis are not legally recognized as dwellers of the province but rather as illegal or temporary refugees and migrants in Sahrawi refugee camps. Their exact number is unknown.)
  - Density: 1.0/km^{2} (2.6/sq mi)
- Time zone: UTC+01 (CET)
- Area Code: +213 (0) 49
- ISO 3166 code: DZ-37
- Districts: 1
- Municipalities: 2

Tindouf Province, also written Tinduf Province (Arabic: ولاية تندوف), is the westernmost province of Algeria, having a population of 58,193 as of the 2008 census (not including the Sahrawi refugees at the Sahrawi refugee camps). Its population in reality could be as high as 160,000 because of the Sahrawi refugee camps. Despite the barren landscape, Tindouf is a resource-rich province, with important quantities of iron ore located in the Gara Djebilet area close to the border with Mauritania. Prior to Algerian independence, the area served as a strongpoint of several tribes of the nomadic Reguibat confederation.

== History ==
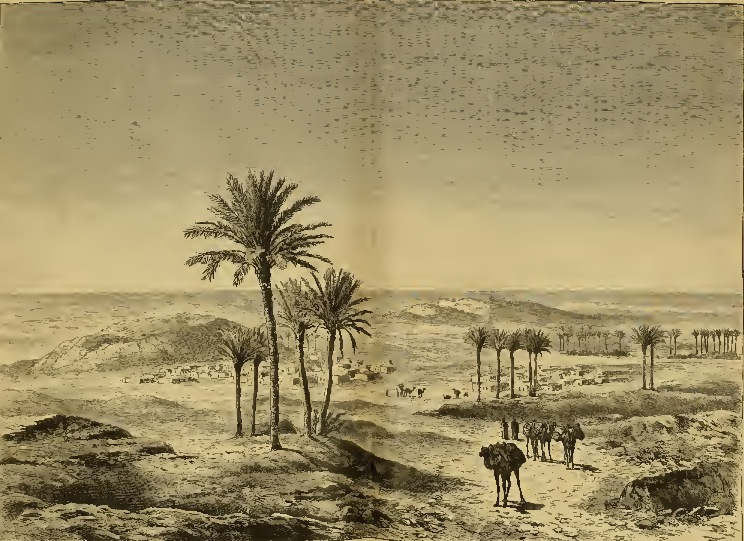
Tindouf, 1880

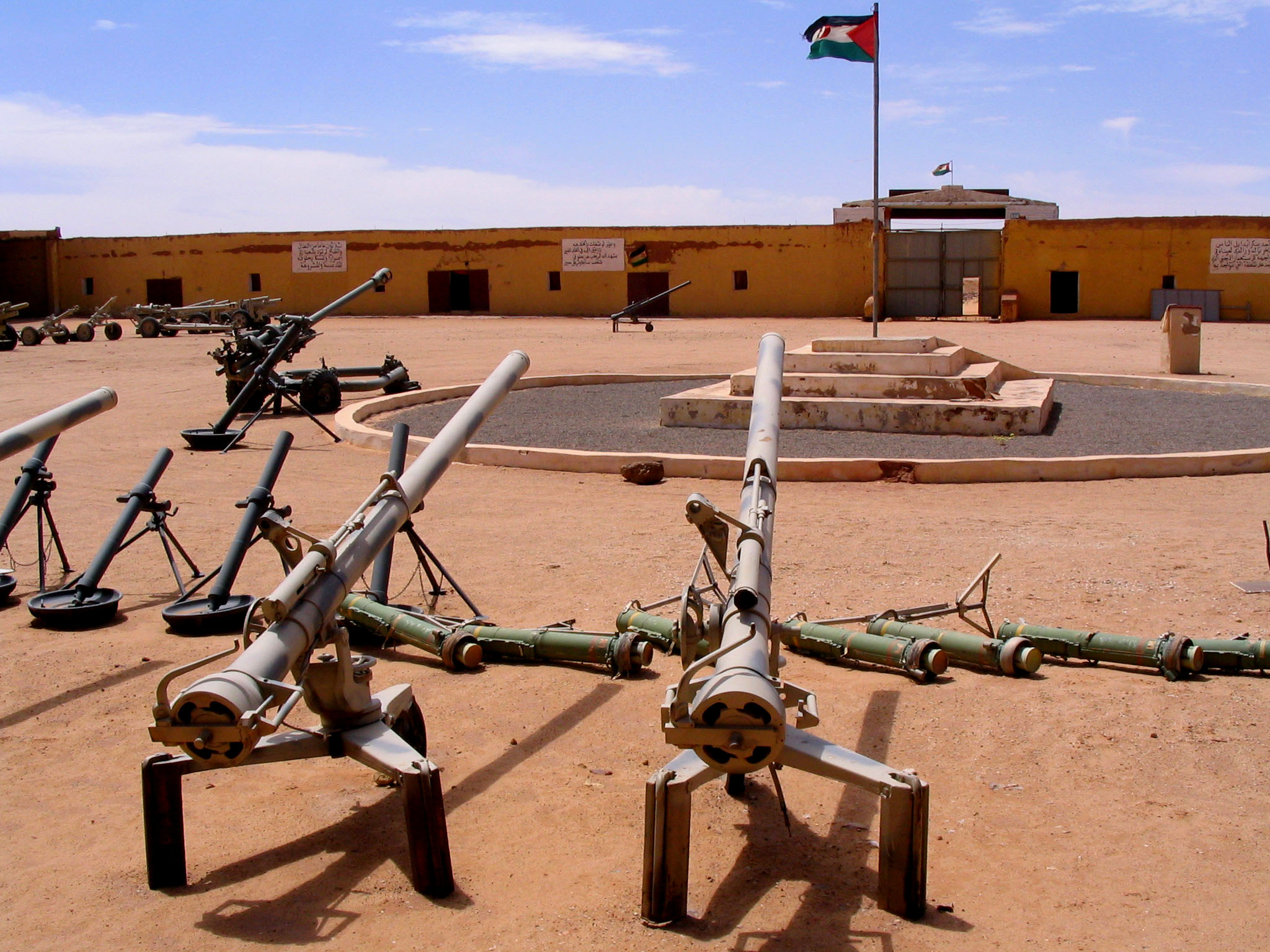
People's Liberation Army Museum

During the Zayyanid period, the Draa region which surrounds the Tindouf province was governed by a sheikh of the Zayyanids.

The town of Tindouf was rebuilt near an isolated Saharan oasis in 1852 by members of the Tajakant tribe, but sacked and destroyed by the Reguibat tribe in 1895. It remained deserted until French troops led by colonel Trinquet arrived in the area in 1934 and attached the region to the French Algeria territory.

The province houses army and airforce bases for the Algerian military, and is strategically important due to its proximity to the Moroccan border, and its location at a four-country border crossing. From independence in 1956, the Kingdom of Morocco claimed the Tindouf area and western Algeria as part of Morocco. These claims are based on the allegations that until 1952, Tindouf was part of French Morocco and was administratively attached to Agadir, and promises made by parts of the Algerian underground during that country's war for independence. After Algeria's independence in 1962, Morocco's claim to Tindouf was not accepted by the new Algerian republic. This led to the 1963 Sand war, fought along the Moroccan-Algerian border in the Tindouf region, and also involving Béchar Province and Tlemcen Province, after Morocco claimed the area as its own following Algerian independence.

In a process beginning in 1969 and finalized during the OAU summit in Rabat in 1972, Morocco recognized the border with Algeria, in exchange for joint exploitation of the iron ore in Tindouf. However, parts of Moroccan society and some nationalist political parties still refer to the Tindouf area as historically Moroccan territory, and the Moroccan parliament has still not ratified the border recognition.

From 1974, refugees from the contested Spanish Sahara started arriving to the Tindouf area, following an earlier wave from the 1958 unrest. This turned into a major exodus from 1975 onwards, when Morocco and Mauritania seized control of what was then called Western Sahara. Algeria retaliated by allowing the Polisario Front, a nationalist Sahrawi movement, to use the area as its main base. Sahrawi refugee camps were established in Tindouf in 1975–6, such as Smara refugee camp and El Aaiun refugee camp. The Polisario remains in the province, running the large refugee camps located south of Tindouf city.

The European Commission refers to the Sahrawi refugees as the "forgotten refugees".

The province was created from Béchar Province in 1984.

== Administrative divisions ==
Map showing the two municipalities, Tindouf (1) and Oum El Assel (2)

The province contains one daïra (district), Tindouf, which is coextensive with the province. The province and daïra has a population of 58,193 inhabitants. The daïra is further divided into two communes or municipalities: Tindouf and Oum El Assel. It is one of only 3 provinces in the country which have only one daïra and, along with Bordj Baji Mokhtar Province, Djanet Province, and In Guezzam Province, also has the fewest communes, with just two.

District	Commune	Arabic
Tindouf District	Tindouf	تندوف
Tindouf District	Oum El Assel	أم العسل

== Economy ==
The Tindouf region is largely arid and with a desert climate and few oases which have developed into small towns and seasonal camel stations of the Trans Saharan Trade Route. Yet in these forbidding conditions the Sahara desert the province of Tindouf is experiencing large scale development in the mining and minerals processing. Prospecting for large natural gas reserves, rare earths and renewable energy which till date had not been commercially viable are also under process in line with the Algerian authorities vision to diversify their economic reliance for beyond crude oil. The region sits at an important cross road connecting central and coastal Algeria to Morocco, Mauritania and Western Sahara hence facilitating a revival of these ancient trade routes would be very beneficial for this region. Due to its massive mineral wealth Tindouf was also part of short lived French-Moroccan border demarcation dispute back in the late 50's.

The Algerian government over the years has managed to evince interest and secure private and public investment apart from Government announced infrastructure projects such as road and railway lines into one of the most inhospitable places in the Sahara desert in the Algerian deep south. There is also an ongoing railway development project linking Tindouf city to Bechar. The Gara Djeibilet region south of Tindouf city hosts around 3.5 billion tons of proven minor minerals reserves claimed to be largest reserve of iron ore on the planet yet.

There is also some phosphate and natron salts mining along with traditional pastoralism, agriculture and fishing being practiced in the area by the large number of displaced Saharawi Repulic refugees who are spread around across numerous camp sites south of Tindouf city and near the Mauritanian border and Gara Djeibilet. These are largely aided and funded by international agencies and the Algerian government with focus on improving the Human Development Index of the region as a whole as the region hosts a large refugee population which is one of the most food and health insecure populations of the world.

The region also boasts of a major potential in wind energy as per studies conducted Algeria's electricity demand is growing at a rapid, 5–7% annual rate and will, require significant addition in capacity possibly 8000 MW by 2010. For example, in 2007, Algeria's natural gas was the largest source of electricity production as it accounts for almost 98% of total electricity with remaining 1% came from small hydroelectric plants. With this growth in electric demand the Algerian government has realized the importance of renewable energy. It has been realized that the renewable energy projects such as solar, biomass, photovoltaic, geothermal and wind, could be used as tools for the management of reserves and sustainable development of desert communities.

== See also ==
- Greater Morocco
- Sahrawi refugee camps
