= Congress of the Polisario Front =

Supreme decision-making body of the Polisario Front

Congress of the Polisario Front مؤتمر جبهة البوليساريو Congreso del Frente Polisario

Type
- Type: Political congress

History
- Founded: 29 April 1973

Structure
- Seats: Varies by Congress
- Length of term: 3 years, extensible to four
- Authority: Polisario Front

Elections
- First election: 10 May 1973 (1st)
- Last election: 13–22 January 2023 (16th)
- Next election: By 2026 (17th)

Rules
- Basic Law of the Polisario Front

The Congress of the Polisario Front (Arabic: مؤتمر جبهة البوليساريو, Spanish: Congreso del Frente Polisario) is the supreme decision-making body of the Polisario Front, with the power to decide on major tasks of the political, organizational, military, social, economic, diplomatic, media, cultural and other areas of the Front and the Sahrawi Republic.

The Congress is held every three years, with the National Secretariat of the Polisario Front being able to postpone it for a year. Participants in the Congress include elected activists, members of the National Secretariat and government, ambassadors, local political officials, members of the General Staff of the Sahrawi People's Liberation Army, delegates elected from every military region, representatives of mass and student organizations, heads of the municipalities and delegates representing the Sahrawi community abroad.

Congresses evaluate the phase between two congresses, decide a program of national action, review the provisions of the Basic Law of the Polisario Front and Constitution of the Sahrawi Arab Democratic Republic, elect both the Secretary-General for the Polisario Front and the members of National Secretariat, which is the leadership body capable of taking major decisions on behalf of the Polisario Front between congresses.

== Convocations ==
16 ordinary and one extraordinary congresses have been held so far.

Congress	Named after the martyr	Duration (start—end)	Elected	Location
Congress	Named after the martyr	Duration (start—end)	Secretary-General	Location
1st Congress	Mohamed Sidi Brahim Bassir	29 April – 1 May 1973	Brahim Ghali	(Mauritania) Zouérat
2nd Congress	Abderrahman Abdelahe	25 – 31 August 1974	El Wali Mustafa Sayed	
3rd Congress	El Wali Mustafa Sayed	25 – 28 August 1976	Mohamed Abdelaziz	
4th Congress	Sid Haydug	25 – 30 September 1978	Mohamed Abdelaziz	
5th Congress	Bachir Saleh	12 – 16 October 1982	Mohamed Abdelaziz	
6th Congress	Mohamed Lamin Abba Chej	7 – 10 December 1985	Mohamed Abdelaziz	
7th Congress	Sidi Azman	28 April – 1 May 1989	Mohamed Abdelaziz	
8th Congress	Bulahe Taleb Omar	17 – 19 June 1991	Mohamed Abdelaziz	
9th Congress	Chej Bachri Hamadi	19 – 26 August 1995	Mohamed Abdelaziz	
10th Congress	Ahmed Salem Mohamed Embarek	26 August – 4 September 1999	Mohamed Abdelaziz	
11th Congress	Emborik Labeid Brahim Al Abd	12 – 19 October 2003	Mohamed Abdelaziz	
12th Congress	Mesaud Embarek Ahmed Lehsan	14 – 20 December 2007	Mohamed Abdelaziz	(Sahrawi Arab Democratic Republic) Tifariti
13th Congress	Mahafud Ali Beiba	15 – 22 December 2011	Mohamed Abdelaziz	(Sahrawi Arab Democratic Republic) Tifariti
14th Congress	Jalil Sidi Emhamed	16 – 20 December 2015	Mohamed Abdelaziz	(Algeria) Dajla camp
Extraordinary Congress	Mohamed Abdelaziz	8 – 9 July 2016	Brahim Ghali	(Algeria) Dajla camp
15th Congress	Bujari Ahmed Barikal-la	19 – 23 December 2019	Brahim Ghali	(Sahrawi Arab Democratic Republic) Tifariti
16th Congress	M'hamed Jaddad	13 – 22 January 2023	Brahim Ghali	(Algeria) Dajla camp
