= 16th Congress of the Polisario Front =

Election to renew the leadership of the Polisario Front

- 13–22 January 2023
- Secretary-General election
- 20 January 2023
- Registered: 2,097 Congressmembers
- Turnout: 89.18%
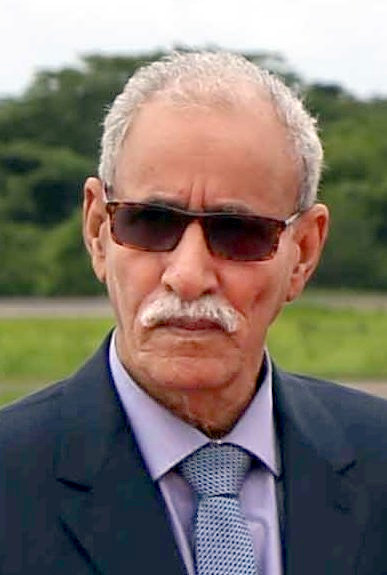

| Candidate | Brahim Ghali | Bachir Mustafa Sayed |
| Electoral vote | 1,253 | 563 |
| Percentage | 69.00% | 31.00% |
- Diagram showing how Congressmembers voted for the Secretary-General.
Secretary-General before election
Brahim Ghali
Polisario Front
Secretary-General-elect
Brahim Ghali
Polisario Front

The 16th Congress of the Popular Front for the Liberation of Saguia El Hamra and Río de Oro (Arabic: المؤتمر السادس عشر للجبهة الشعبية لتحرير الساقية الحمراء ووادي الذهب, Spanish: XVI Congreso del Frente Popular para la Liberación de Saguia El Hamra y Río de Oro) was held in the Dajla refugee camp in Tindouf, Algeria between 13 and 22 January 2023 to renovate the governing bodies of the Polisario Front and establish the movement's main lines of action and strategy for the next leadership term.

The Congress was also used to elect a new Secretary-General for the Polisario Front, which would automatically become the President of the Sahrawi Arab Democratic Republic. For the first time ever, the candidate for Secretary-General was not agreed upon before the Congress. Bachir Mustafa Sayed, brother of the late first president El Uali Mustafa Sayed, ran for the office against the incumbent Brahim Ghali, making this the first truly competitive race for the office and breaking the tradition of establishing a consensus for the office.

The Congress' slogan is "Escalating the fighting to expel the occupation and complete sovereignty" (Arabic: تصعيد القتال لطرد الاحتلال لفرض السيادة, Spanish: Escalar la lucha para expulsar al ocupante e imponer la soberanía). The Congress was also named after M'hamed Jaddad, the late Sahrawi coordinator with the MINURSO.

The Congress is the first one to be held in a wartime situation since 1991, due to the breakout of the Second Western Sahara War in 2020. This situation led to the Congress having little international promotion since the Polisario Front sought instead to unite Sahrawis around a war strategy to intensify the war with this Congress.

The Congress finished with the re-election of Brahim Ghali in the first round, barely avoiding a second round (as the president needs the support of two-thirds of the Congress in the first round to be elected). He obtained 69% of the votes, the lowest score ever obtained by the winning candidate since the introduction of direct vote for the office.

== Background ==
Logo adopted by the Preparatory Commission for the 16th Congress

The Preparatory Commission announced on 27 October 2022 that the 16th Congress would take place between 13 and 17 January 2023 in the wilaya of Dajla, in the Sahrawi refugee camps of Tindouf. It also adopted symbols for the Congress. Due to the war situation, which began when the ceasefire with Morocco broke down in November 2020 after Morocco sent troops to the southern part of Western Sahara to disperse Sahrawi protesters who were blocking the only highway to Mauritania, the Congress was not held in the Liberated Territories.

A "National Preparatory Conference" was held days before the Congress, between 8 and 11 January, to solve disputes and seek a unified position inside the Front, especially towards the candidacy of the General-Secretary.

The Congress was extended twice due to the lengthiness of the debates: it first got a 48-hour extension up to 19 January 2023 and later got a 72-hour one up to 22 January 2023.

During the Congress, members voted to amend the Basic Law of the Polisario Front to change the rules concerning the National Secretariat, forcing a renewal of at least six new members in every term, apart from reducing the members from 50 to 44 by removing two of the 29 Congress-elected members and excluding the mass organisations' (National Union of Sahrawi Women, Sahrawi Trade Union, Sahrawi Youth Union and Union of Sahrawi Students) from having a direct representation in the National Secretariat.

== International presence ==
Several foreign political parties participated or sent messages in support of the 16th Congress, major parties are listed below.

=== Parties that participated in the Congress ===
- Algeria: National Liberation Front, Democratic National Rally, El Binaa, Voice of the People
- Cuba: Communist Party of Cuba
- Mauritania: Union of the Forces of Progress, El Insaf
- Mozambique: FRELIMO
- Namibia: SWAPO (through the Namibian ambassador to the SADR)
- Nicaragua: Sandinista National Liberation Front
- Portugal: Portuguese Communist Party
- Russia: Communists of Russia
- South Africa: African National Congress, South African Communist Party
- Spain: United Left, Podemos, EH Bildu, Anticapitalistas, People's Party, Galician Nationalist Bloc, New Canaries
- Venezuela: United Socialist Party of Venezuela
- Zimbabwe: ZANU–PF

=== Parties that supported the Congress ===
- Panama: Democratic Revolutionary Party
- Portugal: Bloco de Esquerda, Socialist Party (through their Socialist Youth)
- Timor-Leste: Fretilin, CNRT, Democratic Party
- Uruguay: Socialist Party

== Election system ==
The Congress elects the National Secretariat, which is the most important decision-making organism inside the Polisario Front when Congresses are not held, and the General-Secretary of the Front, which automatically becomes President of the Sahrawi Arab Democratic Republic.

To be elected Secretary-General of the Polisario Front the following requirements have to be met:

- Being a Sahrawi national.
- Having a militant experience of at least twenty years and have held positions in the national leadership for at least ten years.
- Having military experience during the war.
- Being at least 40 years old.
- Having a clean criminal record.

The candidates are proposed by the Election Commission, and voted on by the Congress. The vote is done by ballot directly and secretly, with a supermajority of at least two-thirds of the vote required to win the first round and an absolute majority for the second round.

Members of the National Secretariat of the Polisario Front after the 16th Congress shown per method of election. Congress-elected members: 27 seats Secret members of the Occupied Territories: 16 seats General-Secretary of the POLISARIO Front: 1 seat

After the reforms passed by the 16th Congress to the Fundamental Law of the Polisario Front, the National Secretariat will only have 44 members, of which 27 are directly chosen by the Congress, 16 are anonymously elected by the Occupied Territories to become anonymous members, and the General-Secretary serving as an ex officio member. To become a member of the National Secretariat the following requirements have to be met:

- Being a Sahrawi national.
- Having a clean criminal record.
- Being at least 30 years old.
- Having a university or academic graduation certificate with five years of continuous service or field experience of not less than ten years in one or more of the following positions:
  - Regional personnel in the military or higher.
  - Member of a regional branch or higher. Central Director at Ministry level or higher.
  - Ambassador or representative at the state level.
  - Member of the National Constitutional Council, the Superior Council of the Magistracy and the Consultative Council.
  - Member of the executive office of a mass organization.

The vote is direct and secret, with multiple non-transferable vote being used in the first round and ranked voting in the second one. The winning candidates are those who have obtained the absolute majority of the votes in the first round. In case of impossibility of obtaining the required number of candidates, the electoral commission continues to seek the vote of the congressmen on the basis of a list three times greater than the number of remaining candidates until obtaining the number of required candidates, elected by simple majority. There's a gender quota requiring at least six of the Congress-elected members to be women, while a new quota of six new members was introduced in this Congress before the election of the National Secretariat.

== Candidates ==
=== Confirmed ===
- Brahim Ghali, President of the Sahrawi Republic and Secretary-General of the Polisario Front since 2016.
- Bachir Mustafa Sayed, Minister of the Presidency in charge of Political Affairs.

=== Rumoured ===
- Abdelkader Taleb Omar, ambassador to Algeria since 2018 and Prime Minister of the Sahrawi Republic between 2003 and 2018.

== Opinion polling ==
The Sahrawi website ECSaharaui did several informal voting estimations among the Congressmembers, dividing voters into three segments:

Voter demographics in the 16th Congress of the Polisario Front
| Segment | % Ghali | % Sayed | % Undecided | % Lead |
|---|---|---|---|---|
| Army | 75 | 20 | 5 | 55 |
| Popular bases | 80 | 20 | N/A | 60 |
| Youth and public administration | Lean Mustafa Sayed | | | |
| Final estimate | 66 | N/A | N/A | N/A |
| Final result | 69 | 31 | N/A | 38 |

== Results ==
=== Secretary-General ===
Polls opened on 20 January 2023 at 10 AM GMT+1 and closed at 1PM GMT+1. 24 offices were allocated for voting by the Election Committee. There were two candidates, Brahim Ghali and Bachir Mustafa Sayed, for the post of Secretary-General of the Polisario Front.

Ghali was re-elected as Secretary-General of the Polisario Front and President of the Sahrawi Arab Democratic Republic for a three-year term. 1,870 Congressmembers out of 2,097 registered cast a vote; 1,816 votes were valid while 54 votes were considered invalid. Ghali received 1,253 votes (69%) while Mustafa Sayed obtained 563 votes (31%). The Electoral Commission did not record any violations or obstacles during the election.

| Candidate | Votes | % | +/– |
|---|---|---|---|
| Brahim Ghali | 1,253 | 69.00 | –17.10 |
| Bachir Mustafa Sayed | 563 | 31.00 | New |
| Total | 1,816 | 100.00 | – |
| Valid votes | 1,816 | 97.11 | |
| Invalid/blank votes | 54 | 2.89 | |
| Total votes | 1,870 | 100.00 | |
| Registered voters/turnout | 2,097 | 89.18 | |
Source: Sahrawi Press Service

=== National Secretariat ===
Polls opened on 21 January 2023 at 12 AM GMT+1 and closed at 3PM GMT+1 for the first round of the election of the National Secretariat, with 24 offices were allocated for voting. 181 candidates ran for office. Results of the first round were announced by 9AM GMT+1 of the next day, with only two candidates obtaining the required absolute majority and a second round being held that same day, this time with 75 candidates. The new members of the National Secretariat were announced by midnight GMT+1, with results being partially released on Sahrawi media. The quotas were respected, with six women and eight new members elected to the National Secretariat.

| Candidate | First round | | Second round | | Notes |
| Candidate | Votes | % | Votes | % | Notes |
|---|---|---|---|---|---|
| Abdelkader Taleb Omar | 947 | 50.64 | | | Re-elected |
| Lud Daf | 937 | 50.11 | | | Elected |
| Lehbib Mohamed Abdelaziz | | | 1,030 | 55.08 | Elected |
| Abaali Hamudi | | | 1,012 | 54.12 | Elected |
| Marahib El-Mami | | | 973 | 52.03 | Re-elected |
| Mohamed Luali Akeik | | | 966 | 51.66 | Re-elected |
| Mohamed Sidati | | | 917 | 49.04 | Re-elected |
| Mariam Salek Hmada | | | 912 | 48.77 | Re-elected |
| Ahmed Abdi Lehbib | | | 798 | 42.67 | Elected |
| Sidahmed Alayat | | | 790 | 42.25 | Elected |
| Mustafa Mohamed Ali Sid-Elbachir | | | 768 | 41.07 | Re-elected |
| Khatri Addouh | | | | | Re-elected |
| Hasan Buchalga | | | | | Elected |
| Sidi Omar | | | 722 | 38.61 | Re-elected |
| Bachir Mustafa Sayed | | | 719 | 38.45 | Re-elected |
| Mohamed Lamin Buhali | | | 694 | 37.11 | Re-elected |
| Hamma Salama | | | 689 | 36.84 | Re-elected |
| Mohamed Salem Salek | | | 683 | 36.52 | Re-elected |
| Adda Brahim Hmaym | | | 671 | 35.88 | Elected |
| Bouchraya Hammoudi Bayoun | | | 658 | 35.18 | Re-elected |
| Mansur Omar | | | 631 | 33.74 | Re-elected |
| Mohamed Lamin Ahmed | | | 625 | 33.42 | Re-elected |
| Fatma Mehdi | | | | | Re-elected (women's quota) |
| Ezza Babeh | | | | | Re-elected (women's quota) |
| Maluma Larabas Yumani | | | | | Re-elected (women's quota) |
| Enguia Salama | | | | | Elected (women's quota) |
| Jira Bulahi Bad | | | | | Re-elected (women's quota) |
| Total | | | | | |
| Total votes | 1,870 | – | 1,870 | – | |
| Registered voters/turnout | 2,097 | 89.18 | 2,097 | 89.18 | |

== Reactions ==
=== International ===
- Algeria: Algerian president Abdelmadjid Tebboune congratulated re-elected president Brahim Ghali for his victory and reaffirmed Algeria's support to the "just Sahrawi cause".
- Mauritania: The leader of the Union of the Forces of Progress, Mohamed Ould Maouloud (who attended the Congress as a guest), congratulated Ghali on "in his mission to guide the Sahrawi people in their legitimate struggle for self-determination and independence". He also congratulated "the new elected leadership and all the Sahrawi people".
- Namibia: Namibian president Hage Geingob congratulated re-elected president Brahim Ghali for his victory and reaffirmed Namibia's "firm commitment to support the right to self-determination and freedom for the people of Western Sahara".
- Russia: The Chairman of the Central Committee of the Communists of Russia, Sergey Malinkovich, congratulated Ghali for his re-election on behalf of his party and expressed his party's "unwavering solidarity with the Polisario Front and the people of the Sahrawi Arab Democratic Republic".
- Spain: The Communist Party of Spain congratulated the Delegate of the Polisario Front in Spain, Abdullah Arabi, for the results of the 16th Congress and re-affirmed "the support of the communist formation to the just demands of the Sahrawi people and their Government, sole and legitimate representative" through the party's responsible for Western Sahara and the Maghreb, Ismael Sánchez.
  - Galicia: Ana Miranda, a Galician Nationalist Bloc MEP (who attended the Congress as a guest), tweeted on behalf of her party that they salute Brahim Ghali, "re-elected (...) in the democratic process as Secretary General of the POLISARIO Front who will continue to fight with Sahrawi women and men for the freedom, sovereignty, self-determination of Western Sahara".

== Aftermath ==
On 19 January 2023, the Congress approved the National Action Program, which included "intensifying the armed struggle" and "strengthening the diplomatic way" as one of its points. It also approved amendments to the Constitution proposed by the government's legal adviser.

Bachir Mustafa Sayed accepted the results shortly after they were announced, with him criticising the family of Brahim Ghali due to a "defamation and bullying" campaign and announcing he would not run for the office again. He also considered the Congress a "little step we [the Sahrawi people] took together to expand our democracy".

President-elect Brahim Ghali and the newly elected members of the National Secretariat took their oath on the night of 22 January 2023 in front of the Chief Justice of the Supreme Court, Brahim Bella, officially concluding the 16th Congress, with the National Secretariat holding its first session two days later.

On 9 February 2023, Brahim Ghali dissolved the government and reappointed Bouchraya Hammoudi Bayoun as Prime Minister of the Sahrawi Arab Democratic Republic for a second consecutive term, assigning him to form his government as soon as possible. A new government was presented on 14 February 2023, together with the appointment of new governors for the five wilayas (regions) and the administrative camp of the Sahrawi refugee camps.
