= Khalil Mohamed Abdelaziz =

Sahrawi journalist and politician

- الخليل محمد عبد العزيز

Polisario Front Representative to the Community of Madrid
- Incumbent
- Assumed office October 2025
- Prime Minister: Bouchraya Hammoudi Bayoun
- Preceded by: Jadiyetu El Moctar

Personal details
- Born: 1985 (age 40–41) Sahrawi refugee camps, Tindouf, Algeria
- Party: Polisario Front
- Relations: Mohamed Abdelaziz (father); Khadidja Hamdi (mother); Lehbib Mohamed Abdelaziz (brother)

Khalil Mohamed Abdelaziz (Hassaniyya: الخليل محمد عبد العزيز; born 1985) is a Sahrawi journalist, activist, and politician, currently serving as the Polisario Front Representative to the Community of Madrid since 2025.

== Early life ==
Khalil was born in 1985 in the Sahrawi refugee camps of Tindouf, Algeria. He is the son of the late Sahrawi President Mohamed Abdelaziz, and the former Sahrawi Minister of Culture Khadidja Hamdi.

He spent his childhood in the camps and his summers in the Spanish town of Los Barrios under the "Holidays in Peace" programme. He later ended up extending his stay due to health reasons, and eventually graduated from high school in Spain.

He studied Social Communication in Havana thanks to a cooperation agreement between the Sahrawi and Cuban governments.

He returned to the Sahrawi refugee camps in 2011 to work for the Sahrawi public broadcaster RASD TV, with him promoting and working at the Spanish-language section. He also later served as a communications manager for the Polisario Front in Spain.

== Political career ==
Khalil was appointed as the Polisario Front Representative to the Community of Madrid in October 2025, replacing Jadiyetu El Moctar.

After the killing of his brother Lehbib Mohamed Abdelaziz in June 2026, Moroccan newspaper Yabiladi described him as an emerging "significant figure" ahead of the Polisario Front's next congress.
