= 17th Government of the Sahrawi Republic =

Incumbent government of the Sahrawi Republic

Fourth Hammoudi Bayoun cabinet
- 17th Government of the Sahrawi Arab Democratic Republic
- 2023–present
- Nana Labat Rachid, Advisor to the Presidency, announces the 17th Government of the Sahrawi Republic.
- Date formed: 14 February 2023

People and organisations
- President: Brahim Ghali
- Prime Minister: Bouchraya Hammoudi Bayoun
- No. of ministers: 17 (Note: Does not include the Prime Minister.)
- Total no. of members: 22
- Member parties: Polisario Front
- Status in legislature: One-party state

History
- Election: 2023 Sahrawi presidential election
- Legislature terms: 12th term of the Sahrawi National Council
- Predecessor: 16th Government of the Sahrawi Republic
- Successor: Incumbent

The 17th Government of the Sahrawi Arab Democratic Republic was announced by President Brahim Ghali on 14 February 2023, after he won re-election in the 2023 Sahrawi presidential election held during the 16th Congress of the POLISARIO Front. It is headed by Bouchraya Hammoudi Bayoun as Prime Minister, with this being his second consecutive term and his fourth overall.

The government only has three women members out of seventeen ministers and twenty-two cabinet members. Mariam Salek Hmada became the first woman to serve as Minister of the Interior in the SADR and second in the Arab world after Raya El Hassan, who was Minister of Interior and Municipalities in Lebanon between 2019 and 2020.

On 18 February 2023, the newly-appointed ministers took their constitutional oath on the first session of the Council of Ministers.

== Background ==
The government was formed after Brahim Ghali won a third term in the 2023 Sahrawi presidential election held during the 16th Congress of the POLISARIO Front, an election in which he faced a competitive candidate, Bachir Mustafa Sayed.

The government is legally complied to apply the National Action Program approved by the 16th Congress, which included "intensifying the armed struggle" and "strengthening the diplomatic way" as one of its points.

The government is the first one to start its mandate in a war situation since 1991, after the ceasefire was broken in 2020, leading to the Second Western Sahara War.

== Cabinet changes ==
- Naama Said Yumani, Minister Advisor to the Presidency, died on 17 August 2023.
- Brahim Al-Bachir Bel-la replaced Mariam Salek Ahmada as Minister of the Interior on 14 April 2024.
- Mohamed Yeslem Beissat replaced Mohamed Sidati as Minister of Foreign Affairs and African Affairs on 12 April 2025 after the latter's appointment as Representative of the Polisario Front to the United Kingdom and Northern Ireland.

== Council of Ministers ==
Cabinet members
Portfolio	Minister	Took office	Left office	Party
Prime Minister	Bouchraya Hammoudi Bayoun	14 February 2023	Incumbent	Polisario
Minister of Foreign Affairs and African Affairs (Note: Until 12 April 2025, the ministry was known as the Minister of Foreign Affairs.)	Mohamed Sidati	14 February 2023	12 April 2025	Polisario
Minister of Foreign Affairs and African Affairs	Mohamed Yeslem Beissat	12 April 2025	Incumbent	Polisario
Minister of the Interior	Mariam Salek Hmada	14 February 2023	14 April 2024	Polisario
Minister of the Interior	Brahim Al-Bachir Beil-la	14 April 2024	Incumbent	Polisario
Minister of Justice and Religious Affairs	Mohamed Embarek Ahmed (Naanaa)	14 February 2023	Incumbent	Polisario
Minister of Education, Teaching and Vocational Training	Khatri Addouh	14 February 2023	Incumbent	Polisario
Minister of Public Health	Salek Baba Hasanna	14 February 2023	Incumbent	Polisario
Minister of Occupied Territories and the Diaspora	Mustafa Mohamed Ali Sid-el-Bachir	14 February 2023	Incumbent	Polisario
Minister of Information	Hamada Salma	14 February 2023	Incumbent	Polisario
Minister of Water and Environment	Adda Brahim Hmeim	14 February 2023	Incumbent	Polisario
Minister of Transport and Energy	Salek Mohamed Embarek Mohamed Fadel	14 February 2023	Incumbent	Polisario
Minister of Construction and Reconstruction of the Liberated Territories	Salem Sidbrahim Lebsir	14 February 2023	Incumbent	Polisario
Minister of Youth and Sports	Hasanito Mohamed Ashabalel	14 February 2023	Incumbent	Polisario
Minister of Personnel, Public Service and Administration Promotion	Mohamed Al-Mami Tamek	14 February 2023	Incumbent	Polisario
Minister of Culture	Musa Salma	14 February 2023	Incumbent	Polisario
Minister of Social Affairs and Women's Empowerment	Suelma Beiruk	14 February 2023	Incumbent	Polisario
Minister of Commerce	Ahmed Bachar Ammi Omar	14 February 2023	Incumbent	Polisario
Minister of Economic Development	Baba Ahmed Mohamed Yahdih Afdeid	14 February 2023	Incumbent	Polisario
Minister of Cooperation	Fatma Chej Mehdi	14 February 2023	Incumbent	Polisario
National Director of the Protocol	Bulahi Mohamed Fadel Siyed	14 February 2023	Incumbent	Polisario
Minister Delegate
Delegate Minister charged with Religious Affairs (Note: The Minister is delegate to the Minister of Justice and Religious Affairs.)	Sidahmed Aleyat Hamma	14 February 2023	Incumbent	Polisario
Delegate Minister charged with the Control, Supervision and Protection of Public Property, and Relations with Parliament (Note: The Minister is delegate to the Prime Minister.)	Fadali Ali Buya	14 February 2023	Incumbent	Polisario
Delegate Minister charged with Vocational Training (Note: The Minister is delegate to the Minister of Education, Teaching and Vocational Training.)	Maddi Hayay	14 February 2023	Incumbent	Polisario
Secretary General of the Presidency	Mohamed Chej Mohamed Lehbib	14 February 2023	Incumbent	Polisario

== Presidency of the Republic ==
Presidency of the Republic of the 17th Government of the Sahrawi Republic
Portfolio	Name	Party	Took office	Left office
Minister Advisor to the Presidency	Mohamed Lamin Buhali	Polisario	14 February 2023	Incumbent
Minister Advisor to the Presidency in charge of Diplomatic Affairs	Mohamed Salem Uld Salek	Polisario	14 February 2023	Incumbent
Minister Advisor to the Presidency in charge of Economic and Financial Affairs	Mohamed Mouloud Mohamed Fadel	Polisario	14 February 2023	Incumbent
Minister Advisor to the Presidency	Naama Said Yumani	Polisario	14 February 2023	17 August 2023
Advisor to the Presidency in charge of Media and the Arab World	Nana Labat Rachid	Polisario	14 February 2023	Incumbent
Advisor to the Presidency	Abdati Breika	Polisario	14 February 2023	Incumbent
Secretary General of the Presidency	Sidi Okal	Polisario	14 February 2023	Incumbent
Director of the Strategic Studies Center	Brahim Mohamed Mahmoud	Polisario	14 February 2023	Incumbent
Deputy Director of the Strategic Studies Center	Mohamed Sid Ahmed Allal	Polisario	14 February 2023	Incumbent
Director of the President's Office	Mohamed Mouloud Mohamed Lamin	Polisario	14 February 2023	Incumbent
Adviser to the Presidency for Political Affairs	Baddi Sidi Mohamed Abheya	Polisario	14 February 2023	Incumbent
Adviser to the Presidency for Social Affairs	Sidi Ahmed Baba	Polisario	14 February 2023	Incumbent
Ambassador Director of Protocol at the Presidency	Salha Al-Abed	Polisario	14 February 2023	Incumbent

== Governors ==
Governors in the 17th Government of the Sahrawi Republic
Portfolio	Name	Party	Took office	Left office
Governor of El Aaiún	Gauz Mamuni	Polisario	14 February 2023	Incumbent
Governor of Auserd	Jira Bulahi	Polisario	14 February 2023	Incumbent
Governor of Smara	Al-Izza Babeh	Polisario	14 February 2023	Incumbent
Governor of Dajla	Abda Chej	Polisario	14 February 2023	Incumbent
Governor of Bojador	Deih Mohamed Chadad	Polisario	14 February 2023	Incumbent
Governor of the Chahid El-Hafed Administrative and Political Unit	Daf Mohamed Fadel	Polisario	14 February 2023	Incumbent
