= Aliyen Habib Kentaui =

Ambassador of the Sahrawi Arab Democratic Republic

Aliyen Habib Kentaui حبيب علي الكنتاوي

POLISARIO Representative to Sweden
- Incumbent
- Assumed office 4 January 2012
- Prime Minister: Abdelkader Taleb Omar
- Preceded by: Brahim Mojtar

Sahrawi Ambassador to Nigeria
- In office 11 September 2000 – 25 July 2008
- Prime Minister: Bouchraya Hammoudi Bayoun; Abdelkader Taleb Omar
- Succeeded by: Oubi Buchraya Bachir

Sahrawi Ambassador to Ethiopia
- In office February 1996 – September 1999
- Prime Minister: Mahfoud Ali Beiba
- Succeeded by: Mohamed Fadel Ismail Ould Es-Sweyih

Personal details
- Born: 1954 (age 71–72) Smara, Spanish Sahara
- Party: POLISARIO
- Occupation: Diplomat

Aliyen Habib Kentaui (born 1954, in Smara, Western Sahara) is the Polisario Front representative for Sweden.

== Diplomatic postings ==
Prior to 1995, Kentaui was the Sahrawi Arab Democratic Republic (SADR) ambassador for India for some years. He was then appointed as SADR ambassador for Ethiopia and permanent representative to the Organization of African Unity until 2000, when he was replaced by Mohamed Fadel Ismail Ould Es-Sweyih. That year he was accredited as SADR ambassador for Nigeria, presenting his credentials to Nigerian president Olusegun Obasanjo in 2001. He stayed in that post until 2008, after being elected as Wali (Governor) of the Wilaya of Ausserd, at the Sahrawi refugee camps in Tindouf, Algeria. In January 2012, he replaced Brahim Mojtar as POLISARIO Representative for Sweden.
