= Mohamed Fadel Ismail Ould Es-Sweyih =

Sahrawi nationalist politician

Mohamed Fadel Ismail محمد اسماعيل فاضل

Polisario Front Representative to Great Britain
- In office October 2001 – 6 May 2002
- Prime Minister: Bouchraya Hammoudi Bayoun
- Preceded by: Brahim Mojtar
- Succeeded by: Breika Lehbib

Sahrawi Ambassador to Ethiopia
- In office September 1999 – 2 October 2001
- Prime Minister: Bouchraya Hammoudi Bayoun
- Preceded by: Aliyen Habib Kentaui
- Succeeded by: Sadafa Mohamed Bahia

Minister of Information
- In office February 1999 – 18 September 1999
- Prime Minister: Bouchraya Hammoudi Bayoun
- Succeeded by: Sid'Ahmed Batal

Polisario Front Representative to France
- In office November 1995 – February 1999
- Prime Minister: Mahfoud Ali Beiba

Personal details
- Born: 1949 or 1951 El Aaiun, Spanish Sahara
- Died: 6 May 2002 Brixton, London, United Kingdom
- Cause of death: Heart attack
- Resting place: Sahrawi refugee camps, Tindouf, Algeria
- Party: POLISARIO
- Children: Six
- Occupation: Diplomat, Politician, Journalist, Writer

Mohamed-Fadel Ould Ismail Ould Es-Sweyih (1949 or 1951 – 6 May 2002) was a Sahrawi nationalist politician, member of the Polisario Front. He was a prominent member of the Sahrawi Arab Democratic Republic diplomatic corps, holding several posts as SADR ambassador or Polisario Front representative.

== Career ==
In 1972 he got involved in the Embryonic Movement for the Liberation of Saguia el-Hamra and Río de Oro (the precursor of the Polisario Front) headed by El-Ouali Mustapha Sayed. As Ouali, he got arrested and tortured by Moroccan police during the Tan-Tan demonstrations (25–27 May). In 1975, he was part of the Information committee of the POLISARIO, where he became known as a journalist. Shortly after, he became the editor in chief of the Sáhara Libre newspaper.

From 1981, he started to manage as POLISARIO representative, first for Europe, then for France and Sweden. Subsequently, he was counselor to the presidency of the SADR, and to the Sahrawi Commission for the Referendum.

In 1995, he returned to his old post as POLISARIO representative for France. Briefly, he occupied in 1999 the SADR's Ministry of Information, being one of the founders of the Sahrawi Republic official press agency, the Sahara Press Service. In 1998 he wrote the book Les Sahraouis, published by the French editorial L'Harmattan.

From 1999 to 2001 he was appointed as SADR ambassador to Ethiopia, and permanent representative to the Organization of African Unity. In 2001 he was designated as POLISARIO representative for the United Kingdom and Ireland. That year he wrote the book La République Sahraouie ("The Sahrawi Republic"), where he reviews the history and the structure of the SADR. In the night of 5–6 May 2002, Fadel Ismail died in Brixton, London, due to an asthma crisis, followed by a heart attack.

== Legacy ==
Few days after his decease, Sahrawi students in El Aaiun renamed the "Hassan II school" as "Mohamed Fadel Ismail school". On late 2002, ARSO (French: 'Association de soutien à un Référendum libre et régulier au Sahara Occidental') published another Fadel Ismail book, entitled "Lettre à mon frère Marocaine" ("Letter to my Moroccan brother"), with an introduction by Ahmed Baba Miské. Also, an Italian solidarity association in Mantua was named "Associazione Fadel Ismail" in his honour.

A Sahrawi press and cultural centre in Algiers was named "Mohamed Fadel Ismail" in 2004 in his honour.

== See also ==
- Sahara Press Service
