= 13th Congress of the Polisario Front =

Election to renew the leadership of the Polisario Front

- 15–22 December 2011
- Secretary-General election
- 20 December 2011
- Registered: 2,095 Congressmembers
- Turnout: 77.42%
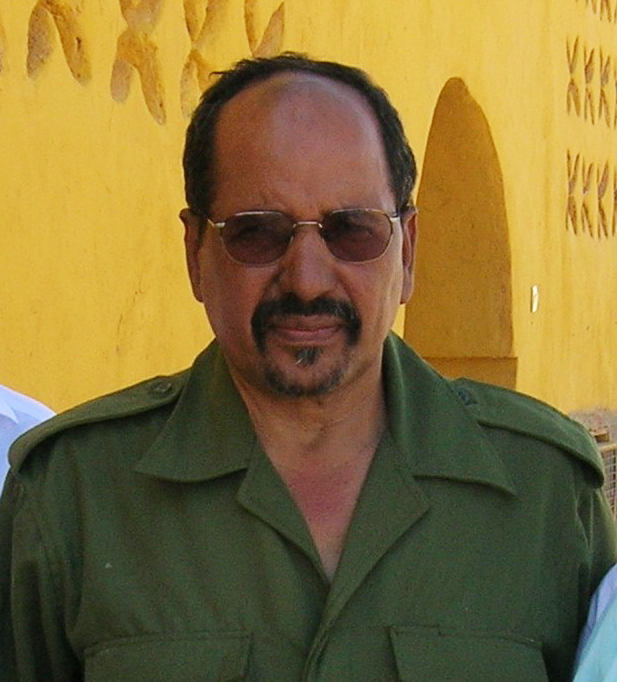
Candidate	Mohamed Abdelaziz
Electoral vote	1,551
Percentage	97.55%
- Diagram showing how Congressmembers voted for the Secretary-General.
Secretary-General before election
Mohamed Abdelaziz
Polisario Front
Secretary-General-elect
Mohamed Abdelaziz
Polisario Front

The 13th Congress of the Popular Front for the Liberation of Saguia El Hamra and Río de Oro (Arabic: المؤتمر الثالث عشر للجبهة الشعبية لتحرير الساقية الحمراء ووادي الذهب, Spanish: XIII Congreso del Frente Popular para la Liberación de Saguia El Hamra y Río de Oro) was held in Tifariti between 15 and 22 December 2011 to renovate the governing bodies of the Polisario Front and establish the movement's main lines of action and strategy for the next leadership term.

The Congress was also used to elect a new Secretary-General for the Polisario Front, which would automatically become the President of the Sahrawi Arab Democratic Republic. Incumbent Mohamed Abdelaziz was easily re-elected for his 11th term.

The Congress' slogan is "The independent Sahrawi state is the solution" (Arabic: الدولة الصحراوية المستقلة هي الحل, Spanish: Un Estado saharaui independiente es la solución). The Congress was also named after Mahfoud Ali Beiba, a late former Sahrawi Prime Minister.

== Background ==
The Congress was held a year after the Gdeim Izik protest camp and amid the context of the Arab Spring and the instability in the Sahara region. The Congress was also marked by the kidnapping of two Spaniard and one Italian international cooperants from the Sahrawi refugee camps in October 2011, which led to increased security measures.

== International presence ==
Several foreign political parties participated in the 13th Congress. The Congress included the participation of around 300 foreign participants. Some of the countries included are: Algeria, Mauritania, South Africa, Nigeria, Angola, Spain, Italy, Slovenia, Ukraine, Belgium, Hungary, Portugal, Cuba, Mexico, El Salvador, Colombia, Timor-Leste, Russia, Venezuela, Brazil; apart from unspecified delegations from Asia; the European Parliament and a Moroccan journalist.

== Results ==
=== Secretary-General ===
Polls opened on 20 December 2011 at 18:30 p.m. local time. 17 offices were allocated for voting by the Election Committee, each with around 150 voters. Incumbent Mohamed Abdelaziz was the only candidate for Secretary-General.

Abdelaziz was re-elected as Secretary-General of the Polisario Front and President of the Sahrawi Arab Democratic Republic for a three-year term. 1,622 Congressmembers out of 2,095 registered cast a vote; 1,590 votes were valid while 32 votes were considered invalid. Abdelaziz received 1,551 votes (98%). The Electoral Commission pointed out that the election process went smoothly, indicating that they recorded some minor problems such as “non-conformity” in the names of some voters in the lists, without significantly affecting the electoral process.

Candidate	Votes	%
Mohamed Abdelaziz	1,551	97.55
Blank votes	39	2.45
Total	1,590	100.00
Valid votes	1,590	98.03
Invalid/blank votes	32	1.97
Total votes	1,622	100.00
Registered voters/turnout	2,095	77.42
Source: Sahara Press Service
