= Mohamed Wali Akeik =

Sahrawi politician and military officer

- محمد الولي أعكيك

Minister-Advisor at the Presidency of the Sahrawi Arab Democratic Republic
- Incumbent
- Assumed office 23 March 2026
- President: Brahim Ghali

Chief of Staff of the Sahrawi People's Liberation Army
- In office 1 November 2021 – 23 March 2026
- President: Brahim Ghali
- Succeeded by: Hamma Salama

Prime Minister of the Sahrawi Arab Democratic Republic
- In office 4 February 2018 – 13 January 2020
- President: Brahim Ghali
- Preceded by: Abdelkader Taleb Omar
- Succeeded by: Bouchraya Hammoudi Bayoun

Personal details
- Born: 1950 (age 75–76) El Aaiún, Spanish Sahara, Spanish West Africa
- Party: Polisario Front
- Children: 8

Mohamed Wali Akeik (Arabic: محمد الولي أعكيك; born 1950) is a Sahrawi politician and military officer who has been Minister-Advisor at the Presidency of the Sahrawi Arab Democratic Republic since 2026.

He was the Prime Minister of the Sahrawi Arab Democratic Republic from 2018 to 2020, and the Chief of Staff of the Sahrawi People's Liberation Army from 2021 to 2026. He has been active in the Western Sahara liberation movement since the 1970s when he joined the Movement for the Liberation of Saguia el Hamra and Wadi el Dhahab and was a founding member of the SPLA.

== Early life and education ==
Mohamed Wali Akeik was born in El Aaiun, Spanish Sahara, in 1950. He graduated from the Marshall Military Academy of Various Weapons.

== Career ==
Akeik was an early member of the Movement for the Liberation of Saguia el Hamra and Wadi el Dhahab. He was a founding member of the Sahrawi People's Liberation Army in El Aaiun in 1973, and was governor and commander of the army in the region. He was wounded in fighting and arrested for one year after participating in an attack on a Bou Craa phosphate conveyor belt in on 20 October 1974.

Akeik was Minister for the Moroccan Occupied Territories of Western Sahara and the Sahrawi Diaspora and a member of the National Secretariat of the Polisario Front. He holds the rank of major general in the Sahrawi People's Liberation Army.

President Brahim Ghali appointed Akeik to replace Abdelkader Taleb Omar as prime minister on 5 February 2018. He was appointed as chief of staff of the Sahrawi People's Liberation Army by Ghali on 1 November 2021, amid a reshuffling of the military leadership. Hamma Salama succeeded Akeik as chief on 23 March 2026, while he became Minister-Advisor at the Presidency of the Republic.

== Personal life ==
Akeik is married and is the father of eight children.

== Works cited ==
=== News ===
- "Биография премьер-министра г-на Мохамеда Эль-Вали Акека". Sahara Press Service. 5 February 2018. Archived from the original on 7 February 2018.
- "Sahara: Algeria supplies Polisario with additional weapons pushing for proxy war against Morocco". Sahara Press Service. 1 November 2021. Archived from the original on 1 November 2021.
- "Western Sahara: President Ghali appoints Mohamed Wali Akeik as Premier, replacing Abdelkader Taleb Omar". Algeria Press Service. 5 February 2018. Archived from the original on 26 June 2025.

=== Web ===
- "Committee of Chiefs of Staff of NARC Member States convenes its 11th meeting in Algeria". North African Region Capability. Archived from the original on 26 June 2025.
- El Hafed, Shaheed (23 March 2026). "President of Republic oversees handover of duties to Chief of Staff of Sahrawi People's Liberation Army". Sahara Press Service. Archived from the original on 26 March 2026.

Political offices
Preceded by Abdelkader Taleb Omar	Prime Minister of the Sahrawi Republic; 2018–2020	Succeeded by Bouchraya Hammoudi Bayoun
