= List of leaders of Middle Eastern and North African states =

This is a list of leaders of Middle Eastern and North African states. It consists of the heads of state and government within the Arab League, and of other MENA countries outside it.

== Leaders of Arab League member states ==
State	Region	Image	Leader	Title	In Office
Algeria	Maghreb		Abdelmadjid Tebboune	President of Algeria	19 December 2019
Algeria	Maghreb		Sifi Ghrieb	Prime Minister of Algeria	28 August 2025
Bahrain	Arabian Peninsula		Hamad bin Isa Al Khalifa	King of Bahrain	6 March 1999
Bahrain	Arabian Peninsula		Salman bin Hamad Al Khalifa	Prime Minister of Bahrain	11 November 2020
Comoros	Indian Ocean (Note: Comoros is entirely outside of the MENA, but is a Member of the Arab League.)		Azali Assoumani	President of the Comoros	26 May 2016
Djibouti	Horn of Africa		Ismaïl Omar Guelleh	President of Djibouti	8 May 1999
Djibouti	Horn of Africa		Abdoulkader Kamil Mohamed	Prime Minister of Djibouti	1 April 2013
Egypt	Northeast Africa (Note: Bulk of Territory; All of North Sinai and South Sinai, as well as parts of Port Said, Ismailia and Suez, are in Asia.)		Abdel Fattah el-Sisi	President of Egypt	8 June 2014
Egypt	Northeast Africa		Mostafa Madbouly	Prime Minister of Egypt	14 June 2018
Iraq	Fertile Crescent		Nizar Amidi	President of Iraq	11 April 2026
Iraq	Fertile Crescent		Ali al-Zaidi	Prime Minister of Iraq	14 May 2026
Jordan	Fertile Crescent		Abdullah II of Jordan	King of Jordan	7 February 1999
Jordan	Fertile Crescent		Jafar Hassan	Prime Minister of Jordan	15 September 2024
Kuwait	Arabian Peninsula		Mishal Al-Ahmad Al-Jaber Al-Sabah	Emir of Kuwait	16 December 2023
Kuwait	Arabian Peninsula		Ahmad Al-Abdullah Al-Sabah	Prime Minister of Kuwait	15 May 2024
Lebanon	Levant		Joseph Aoun	President of Lebanon	9 January 2025
Lebanon	Levant		Nawaf Salam	Prime Minister of Lebanon	8 February 2025
Libya	Maghreb		Mohamed al-Menfi	Chairman of the Presidential Council of Libya	10 March 2021
Libya	Maghreb		Abdul Hamid Dbeibeh (Note: Leadership is disputed.)	Prime Minister of Libya	15 March 2021
Mauritania	Maghreb		Mohamed Ould Ghazouani	President of Mauritania	1 August 2019
Mauritania	Maghreb		Mokhtar Ould Djay	Prime Minister of Mauritania	5 August 2024
Morocco	Maghreb		Mohammed VI of Morocco	King of Morocco	23 July 1999
Morocco	Maghreb		Fatima Ezzahra El Mansouri	Prime Minister of Morocco	29 September 2026
Oman	Arabian Peninsula		Haitham bin Tariq	Sultan of Oman	11 January 2020
Palestine	Levant		Mahmoud Abbas	President of Palestine	8 May 2005
Palestine	Levant		Mohammad Mustafa	Prime Minister of Palestine	12 March 2024
Qatar	Arabian Peninsula		Tamim bin Hamad Al Thani	Emir of Qatar	25 June 2013
Qatar	Arabian Peninsula		Mohammed bin Abdulrahman bin Jassim Al Thani	Prime Minister of Qatar	7 March 2023
Saudi Arabia	Arabian Peninsula		Salman of Saudi Arabia	King of Saudi Arabia	23 January 2015
Saudi Arabia	Arabian Peninsula		Mohammed Bin Salman	Prime Minister of Saudi Arabia	27 September 2022
Somalia	Horn of Africa		Aden Madobe	Acting President of Somalia	15 May 2026
Somalia	Horn of Africa		Hamza Abdi Barre	Prime Minister of Somalia	25 June 2022
Sudan	Northeast Africa		Abdel Fattah al-Burhan	Chairman of the Transitional Sovereignty Council	11 November 2021
Sudan	Northeast Africa		Kamil Idris	Prime Minister of Sudan	19 May 2025
Syria	Levant		Ahmed al-Sharaa	President of Syria (Note: Leader of the Syrian transitional government under the Constitutional Declaration of 2025.)	8 December 2024 (Note: As de facto Head of State of Syria until 29 January 2025.)
Tunisia	Maghreb		Kais Saied	President of Tunisia	23 October 2019
Tunisia	Maghreb		Sara Zaafarani	Prime Minister of Tunisia	21 March 2025
United Arab Emirates	Arabian Peninsula		Mohamed bin Zayed Al Nahyan	President of the United Arab Emirates	14 May 2022
United Arab Emirates	Arabian Peninsula		Mohammed bin Rashid Al Maktoum	Prime Minister of the United Arab Emirates	11 February 2006
Yemen	Arabian Peninsula		Rashad al-Alimi	Chairman of the Presidential Leadership; Council of Yemen	7 April 2022
Yemen	Arabian Peninsula		Shaya al-Zindani	Prime Minister of Yemen	15 January 2026

== Leaders of other states and unrecognised states in the MENA region ==
State	Region	Image	Leader	Title	In Office
Abkhazia	Near East and the Caucasus		Badra Gunba	President of Abkhazia	2 April 2025
Abkhazia	Near East and the Caucasus		Vladimir Delba	Prime Minister of Abkhazia	3 April 2025
Afghanistan	Near East		Hibatullah Akhundzada	Supreme Leader of Afghanistan	15 August 2021
Afghanistan	Near East		Hasan Akhund	Prime Minister of Afghanistan	23 August 2025
Armenia	Near East and the Caucasus		Vahagn Khachaturyan	President of Armenia	13 March 2022
Armenia	Near East and the Caucasus		Nikol Pashinyan	Prime Minister of Armenia	8 May 2018
Azerbaijan	Near East and the Caucasus		Ilham Aliyev	President of Azerbaijan	31 October 2003
Azerbaijan	Near East and the Caucasus		Ali Asadov	Prime Minister of Azerbaijan	8 October 2019
Chad	Central Africa		Mahamat Déby	President of Chad	20 April 2021 (Note: As President of the Transitional Military Council until 10 October 2022, and Transitional State President until 10 May 2024.)
Chad	Central Africa		Allamaye Halina	Prime Minister of Chad	24 May 2024
Cyprus	Levant		Nikos Christodoulides	President of Cyprus	28 February 2023
Eritrea	Horn of Africa		Isaias Afwerki	President of Eritrea	24 May 1993
Ethiopia	Horn of Africa		Taye Atske Selassie	President of Ethiopia	7 October 2024
Ethiopia	Horn of Africa		Abiy Ahmed	Prime Minister of Ethiopia	2 April 2018
Georgia	Near East and the Caucasus		Mikheil Kavelashvili	President of Georgia	29 December 2024
Georgia	Near East and the Caucasus		Irakli Kobakhidze	Prime Minister of Georgia	8 February 2023
Iran	Near East		Mojtaba Khamenei	Supreme Leader of Iran	8 March 2026
Iran	Near East		Masoud Pezeshkian	President of Iran	28 July 2024
Israel	Levant		Isaac Herzog	President of Israel	7 July 2021
Israel	Levant		Benjamin Netanyahu	Prime Minister of Israel	29 December 2022
Northern Cyprus	Levant		Tufan Erhürman	President of Northern Cyprus	23 October 2025
Northern Cyprus	Levant		Ünal Üstel	Prime Minister of Northern Cyprus	12 May 2022
Sahrawi Republic	Maghreb		Brahim Ghali	President of the Sahrawi Republic	12 July 2016
Sahrawi Republic	Maghreb		Bouchraya Hammoudi Bayoun	Prime Minister of the Sahrawi Republic	13 January 2020
South Ossetia	Near East and the Caucasus		Marat Kambolov	Acting President of South Ossetia	23 June 2026
South Ossetia	Near East and the Caucasus		Marat Kambolov	Prime Minister of South Ossetia	16 June 2026
Somaliland	Horn of Africa		Abdirahman Mohamed Abdullahi	President of Somaliland	12 December 2024
Turkey	Anatolia, the Fertile Crescent, and the Caucasus (Note: Bulk of Territory; Hatay is in the Fertile Crescent region; all of Edirne, Tekirdağ and Kırklareli, as well as parts of Çanakkale and Istanbul, are in the East Thrace / Balkans region, and therefore outside of the MENA)		Recep Tayyip Erdoğan	President of Turkey	28 August 2014
