= Lehbib Mohamed Abdelaziz =

Sahrawi military commander (1989–2026)

- Undated photo of Abdelaziz
- Born: 1989; Tindouf refugee camps, Algeria
- Died: 7 June 2026 (aged 36–37); Mijek, Western Sahara
- Cause of death: Drone strike
- Education: University of Algiers
- Children: 3
- Relatives: Mohamed Abdelaziz (father); Khadidja Hamdi (mother); Khalil Mohamed Abdelaziz (brother)
- Military career
- Allegiance: Sahrawi Republic
- Branch: Sahrawi People's Liberation Army
- Service years: 2011–2026
- Rank: Commander
- Commands: First Reserve Brigade
- Conflicts: Western Sahara clashes

Lehbib Mohamed Abdelaziz (Note: Also transliterated as Lahbib Mohamed Abdelaziz; Hassaniyya: لحبيب محمد عبد العزيز.) (1989 – June 2026) was a Sahrawi military commander and member of the National Secretariat of the Polisario Front. He was the youngest son of Mohamed Abdelaziz, former president of the Sahrawi Republic.

Abdelaziz enlisted in the Sahrawi People's Liberation Army in 2011. In the 2020s, he became a rising figure within the Polisario Front's ranks. In June 2026, Abdelaziz was killed by a Moroccan drone strike during renewed Western Saharan clashes.

== Early life ==
Lehbib Mohamed Abdelaziz was born in the Sahrawi refugee camps of Tindouf, Algeria, in 1989. Abdelaziz was of the eastern Reguibat tribe and born into an elite Sahrawi family. His father, Mohamed Abdelaziz (1947–2016), was the president of the Sahrawi Republic from 1976 until his death in 2016. His mother, Khadidja Hamdi (–2025), was from a wealthy family and served as the Sahrawi minister of culture from 2008 to 2015.

Abdelaziz was the youngest of Mohamed Abdelaziz's six children. He completed his primary education in the refugee camps. However, unlike his siblings who grew up in the camps, he was later raised in his grandfather's home. Abdelaziz studied international relations at the University of Algiers, receiving his degree in 2011. During his studies, he was the president of the Sahrawi Students' Union.

== Career ==
Abdelaziz returned to Tindouf and enlisted in the Sahrawi People's Liberation Army shortly after graduating from university. In 2013, he was appointed by his father to lead a gendarmerie squadron. In 2019, he was granted an honorary "director" title within the Sahrawi army. He later completed training at the Cherchell Military Academy in Cherchell, Algeria, prior to his promotion as major general. During his military career, he held the positions of platoon leader and later battalion commander.

Abdelaziz previously maintained a private life and only partook in one media interview before 2021. In January 2023, Abdelaziz was elected as a member of the National Secretariat at the 16th Congress of the Polisario Front. Weeks later, he was promoted to sit on the military council in charge of directing the ongoing Western Sahara clashes. By May 2023, The Africa Report dubbed Abdelaziz as the "Polisario Prince" and as the movement's "rising star". In 2024, Sahrawi president Brahim Ghali promoted Abdelaziz to command the First Reserve Brigade, a move described by El Pais as a sign of Abdelaziz's growing political and military influence. Media outlets described Abdelaziz as Ghali's potential successor.

== Death ==
In November 2020, low-intensity clashes resumed between Morocco and the Polisario Front, with the latter declaring that the 1991 ceasefire was void. Morocco uses drone warfare to attack Sahrawi targets; there are no effective countermeasures in Western Sahara against the drones.

On 7 June 2026, Abdelaziz and two other combatants were killed by a Royal Moroccan Armed Forces drone strike while riding in a military vehicle near Mijek, Western Sahara. Other combatants were injured in the strike as well. According to the Polisario Front, the group was targeted by the drone while withdrawing from a routine combat operation at the Western Sahara berm. Though Morocco did not publicly acknowledge the operation, Le Monde reported that there was "little doubt" that Morocco was responsible. El Pais equated the targeted killing to Israel's assassinations of its political enemies due to Abdelaziz's rising political profile.

A funeral was held in the Polisario-controlled area of Western Sahara, and the Sahrawi Republic declared three national days of mourning. Abdelaziz was survived by his wife, his two daughters, and his son. The Polisario Front stated that, despite the killings, it was still committed to peace negotiations with Morocco. President Ghali refrained from characterizing the drone strike as a selective attack because, according to him, Morocco targets all members of the Polisario Front—including its military, diplomats, and human rights defenders. Following the killing, Moroccan news website Yabiladi described Abdelaziz's brother Khalil Mohamed Abdelaziz as an emerging "significant figure" ahead of the Polisario Front's next congress.

The UN deputy spokesman for the Secretary-General, Farhan Haq, reported that MINURSO was "seeking security clearances from the parties to conduct an investigation" of the incident. Spanish foreign minister José Manuel Albares defended Spain's decision not to comment on the drone strike, stating that "no country in the world has commented on it" and that it was in Spain's best interests to maintain good relations with Morocco and other neighboring states. European Commission vice-president Kaja Kallas declined to open an investigaton into the drone strikes and instead emphasized close Morocco–European Union relations.
