= List of ambassadors of the Sahrawi Arab Democratic Republic to Mexico =

Sahrawi Ambassador to Mexico
- Sahrawi coat of arms
- Incumbent; Mojtar Leboihi Emboiric since 2020
- Ministry of Foreign Affairs
- Style: His Excellency
- Appointer: The president
- Inaugural holder: Bujari Ahmed (resident)
- Formation: 1988

The ambassador of the Sahrawi Arab Democratic Republic to Mexico is the official representative of the Sahrawi Arab Democratic Republic (SADR) to Mexico. The embassy is located at Calle Flamarion 44, Colonia Verónica Anzures, Miguel Hidalgo, Mexico City. Prior to its opening, the embassy in Caracas was accredited instead.

== Background ==
Mexico and the Sahrawi Arab Democratic Republic (SADR) established relations in 1979. In 1979, Mexico appointed its ambassador to Algeria, Oscar González, as ambassador concurrent to the SADR. In 1988, an embassy opened in Mexico City.

== List of representatives ==
Ambassadors from the Sahrawi Arab Democratic Republic to Mexico
Name	Term begin	Term end	President	Notes
Bujari Ahmed	1988	1989	Mohamed Abdelaziz	First resident ambassador.
Salek Bobbih	February 10, 1989	?	Mohamed Abdelaziz	Also written "Salec Bobbih".
Bachari Saleh	?	August 2004	Mohamed Abdelaziz	
Ahmed Mulay Ali Hamadi	August 2004	2020	Mohamed Abdelaziz	Previously served as the Polisario Front's representative in Madrid.
Mojtar Leboihi Emboiric	2020	Incumbent	Brahim Ghali	
