= Oubi Buchraya Bachir =

Sahrawi diplomat

His Excellency Oubi Buchraya Bachir

Sahrawi Ambassador to Nigeria
- Incumbent
- Assumed office 25 July 2008
- Prime Minister: Abdelkader Taleb Omar
- Preceded by: Aliyen Habib Kentaui

Sahrawi Ambassador to South Africa
- In office 19 April 2006 – 10 February 2008
- Preceded by: Sadafa Mohamed Bahia
- Succeeded by: Salah Abd Mohamed

Polisario Front Representative to Great Britain
- In office 30 October 2003 – 2006
- Prime Minister: Abdelkader Taleb Omar
- Preceded by: Breika Lehbib
- Succeeded by: Sidi Mohamed Omar

Polisario Front Representative to the Netherlands
- In office 2001 – 30 October 2003
- Prime Minister: Bouchraya Hammoudi Bayoun

Personal details
- Born: 1970 (age 55–56) Mijek, Sáhara Occidental
- Party: POLISARIO
- Education: University of Paris, France
- Occupation: Diplomat

Oubi Buchraya Bachir (born 1970 in Mijek, Sahara Occidental) is the current Sahrawi ambassador to Nigeria, with a base in Abuja. He earned a master's degree in "Conflicts, Peace and Development" at James I University in Castellón de la Plana. He speaks Hassaniya (a variety of Arabic), French and Spanish.

== Diplomatic postings ==
He started his diplomatic career in 2001, being appointed as the Sahrawi representative for the Netherlands, based in The Hague. In late 2003, he moved to London, as the Sahrawi representative to the United Kingdom and Ireland.

In 2006, he replaced Sadafa Mohamed Bahia as the Sahrawi ambassador to South Africa. In July 2008, he replaced Aliyen Habib Kentaui, presenting this credentials as ambassador to Nigerian President Umaru Musa Yar'Adua. Between 2010 and 2011 he acted first as special envoy and then as non-resident ambassador to Ghana, until the accreditation in late 2011 of Mahayub Sidina, the first Sahrawi resident ambassador in Accra.
