= Arab humor =

Wit and humor in Arab culture

Arab humor refers to the various forms of humor that exist within the Arab world. It is an important aspect of Arab culture and reflects the complexities and nuances of the Arab world. Arab humor is known for being witty, clever, and sarcastic. It often involves wordplay, puns, and irony. One common form of Arab humor is political satire, where political leaders and public figures are ridiculed and criticized through humor. This type of humor can be found in television shows, cartoons, and social media. Arab humor also includes jokes that are based on social norms and traditions. These jokes often poke fun at things that are considered taboo or unconventional. For example, jokes about gender roles, and family dynamics are common.

== History ==
Arab humor has a long history, dating back to ancient times. Arab literature, particularly poetry, is known for its use of humor. In the pre-Islamic era, poets used humor to criticize and satirize their rulers and the society in which they lived. This tradition continued into the Islamic era, with the famous Arab poet, Al-Mutanabbi, being known for his use of satire and irony.

In modern times, Arab humor has been shaped by political and social events. The Arab Spring, for example, inspired a wave of political satire and humor across the Arab world. In countries like Egypt and Tunisia, satirical television shows and social media accounts emerged, using humor to criticize their governments and leaders.

Despite its popularity, Arab humor can be controversial. In some cases, jokes and satire have led to arrests and even imprisonment. In countries like Saudi Arabia and the United Arab Emirates, authorities have cracked down on comedians and satirists who criticize the government or social norms.
