= Khadidja Hamdi =

Sahrawi politician (died 2025)

First Lady of Sahrawi Arab Democratic Republic
- In office 30 August 1976 – 31 May 2016
- President: Mohamed Abdelaziz
- Preceded by: Muieina Chejatu (Acting)

Personal details
- Born: Smara, Spanish Sahara
- Died: 11 July 2025
- Party: Polisario Front
- Spouse: Mohamed Abdelaziz
- Children: 3, including Lehbib Mohamed Abdelaziz and Khalil Mohamed Abdelaziz
- Education: Mohammed V University

Khadidja Hamdi (Arabic: خَديجة حَمْدي; died 11 July 2025) was a Sahrawi politician and activist. She was one of two women ministers in the Sahrawi Arab Democratic Republic (SADR) Government and held the post of Minister for Culture.

== Political career ==
Hamdi was an outspoken campaigner for Sahrawi women's rights, the value of cultural heritage and the importance of education to young people, especially those, like many Sahrawi who are displaced from their homeland. Her work in these areas encouraged international support for Sahrawi self-determination and in 2009 Hamdi led the delegation to the 2nd Pan-African Cultural Festival, held in Algiers.

During the festival, Hamdi publicly called on the Kingdom of Morocco to obey international law to enable self-determination and independence for the Sahrawi people. She was a vocal critic of the government of Morocco and their treatment of Sahrawi political prisoners, especially about a media black-out that was imposed on a group of 24 activists in 2013.

=== Women's rights ===
Speaking in public at international events was an important part of Hamdi's ministerial work. She travelled widely discussing Sahrawi rights and the rights of Sahrawi women – women who have often taken up leadership roles within refugee camps. In 2013, Hamdi travelled to Nigeria as part of the Global Power Women Network Africa (GPWNA) event. She praised the support the Nigerian government was giving the struggle for independence and commented on how women from all countries in Africa needed to work together to claim, support and expand their human and civil rights. She travelled to the UK in 2007 to lobby Members of Parliament, at the invitation of Jeremy Corbyn. She spoke alongside Aminetou Haidar. Hamdi had previously led, with her colleague Zahra Ramdan, the 2003 delegation of the National Union of Saharawi Women on their tour of political party conferences in the UK. This tour lasted nineteen days and they canvassed support for the Sahrawi cause and met with political leaders including Tony Blair, Jack Straw and Glenys Kinnock.

In 2006, in the Week of Solidarity with the SADR held in Algeria, Hamdi spoke to the conference under the title "The Saharawi woman: between duty of liberation and demands of the state". She was part of a wider discussion which included Nouria Hafs, the Secretary-General of the National Union of Algerian Women, and Saida Benhabilès, the President of the Algerian Women's Movement for Solidarity with Rural Women. Hamdi had previously led a 2003 delegation of Sahrawi women to the Algerian Popular Assembly, and met with its president Karim Younes.

=== Children's rights ===
Educating young people about Sahrawi heritage and culture and the access of Sahrawi young people to wider educational opportunities were important areas that Hamdi supported. In 2007, whilst in London she also spoke about the Sahrawi struggle at two schools. In 2001, Hamdi supported the delegation of Scouting and Guiding in Western Sahara to attend an international forum that eleven young people from the organization attended. She continued throughout her life to campaign for better access to education in refugee camps.

=== Cultural heritage ===
Hamdi was praised in 2014 for leading a "cultural resistance" to the occupation of the SADR, when she was welcomed to Algiers by the Algerian Minister for Culture Khalida Toumi. She spoke out publicly about the power of culture, both in terms of identity politics in Western Sahara, but also in terms of how art or poetry can be a catalyst for the cause of self-determination. In 2008, Hamdi petitioned Koïchiro Matsuura, Director-General of the UNESCO, to support educational programs in Sahrawi refugee camps, as well as supporting work to preserve and promote their cultural heritage for the future.

==== Film ====
Hamdi was closely involved with the Sahara International Film Festival. She launched the 12th festival in 2015 jointly with SADR Prime Minister Abdelkader Taleb Omar and South Africa's ambassador to Algeria, Dennis Thokozani Dlomo. The theme was "Universal Justice" and it had 423 participants from 20 countries. During the 2012 festival, Hamdi presented the festival's highest award, The White Camel, to Javier Bardem and Alvaro Longoria for their documentary film “Sons of the Clouds: Last Colony”.

==== Archives ====
In 2008, Hamdi visited Austria, where a team from GEZA were working to build a National Electronic Archive for Western Sahara. She led on a variety of cultural programmes for the population in exile, from projects around violence against women, to an oral history project called "Tell Me, Grandfather" to continually build up Sahrawi cultural heritage with young people.

==== Arts ====
In 2013, Hamdi travelled to Finland to raise awareness about women's rights in Western Sahara, especially in refugee camps and to open a new exhibition of artwork by Sahrawi artist Fadel Jalifa.

=== Accusations of aid misappropriation ===
In November 2011 it was rumored that a CD-ROM was being sent around refugee camps and on it were details of financial misappropriation of humanitarian aid, led by the Khadidja Hamdi.

== Personal life and death ==
Khadidja Hamdi was married to the president of the SADR, Mohamed Abdelaziz until his death in 2016.

She was also a writer, and her book "Wedding in a Prison" was one amongst 7000 that was donated to the SADR, by the Algerian Minister of Culture.

Hamdi died on 11 July 2025, after what was described as "a struggle with terminal illness".
