= Hamadi =

Hamadi is an Arabic surname. Notable people with the surname include:

- Abdel Wahab al-Hamadi (born 1979), Kuwaiti writer
- Ahmed Mulay Ali Hamadi (born 1954), Sahrawi diplomat
- Ali Al-Hamadi (born 2002), English-Iraqi footballer
- Fadane Hamadi (born 1992), Comorian track and field athlete
- Hamadi Ould Baba Ould Hamadi (born 1948), Mauritanian politician
- Hassane Hamadi, Comorian politician
- Muhammad Shamte Hamadi (1907–1964), Zanzibari politician
- Najah Hamadi (born 1984), Tunisian footballer
- Osama Al Hamadi (born 1975), Libyan football player
- Sa'dun Hammadi (1930–2007), Iraqi Prime Minister
