= Mohamed Abdelaziz =

Mohamed Abdelaziz may refer to:

- Mohamed Abdelaziz (Sahrawi politician) (1946–2016), president of the Sahrawi Arab Democratic Republic (1976–2016)
- Mohamed Abdelaziz (Libyan politician) (born 1951/1952), Minister of Foreign Affairs of Libya (2013–2014)
- Mohamed Ould Abdel Aziz (born 1956), president of Mauritania (2009–2019)
- Mohamed Abdelaziz (basketball) (born 1995), Qatari basketball player.

== See also ==
- Mohamed Abdelaziz Tchikou (born 1985), Algerian football player
- Muhammad Abdul Aziz (born 1938), American man wrongly convicted of the assassination of Malcolm X
