= Ahmed Mulay Ali Hamadi =

Western Sahara politician

His Excellency Ahmed Mulay Ali Hamadi مولاي أحمد علي حمادي

Sahrawi Ambassador to Mexico
- In office August 2004 – 2020
- Prime Minister: Abdelkader Taleb Omar
- Preceded by: Bachari Saleh
- Succeeded by: Mujtar Leboihi Emboiric

Personal details
- Born: 1954 (age 71–72) Hagunia or El Aaiun, Spanish Sahara, Spanish West Africa
- Party: POLISARIO
- Education: National Autonomous University of Mexico, Mexico
- Occupation: Diplomat, writer
- Website: http://www.embajadasaharauimexico.org/

Ahmed Mulay Ali Hamadi (Arabic: مولاي أحمد علي حمادي; born 1954) is a Sahrawi diplomat and writer. He is Director General for Latin America and the Caribbean at the Ministry of Foreign Affairs of the Sahrawi Arab Democratic Republic. He was Sahrawi ambassador to Mexico, with a base in Mexico City, between 2004 and 2020. He is a licenciate on International Relations by the UNAM, and a member of the Mexican Academy of International Law. Apart from his diplomatic career, Mulay Ali is also a writer in Spanish language, with books published in Mexico.

== Personal life ==
Mulay Ali was born in 1954 in Hagunia, a town near El Aaiun, the capital of the territory. In 1976, he was among the Polisario Front militants helping the Sahrawi civilians who were fleeing from the cities occupied by Morocco. In 1997, he was an observer of the identification process in El Aaiun for the planned self-determination referendum, and saw his mother and daughter for the first time since 1976.

== Diplomatic postings ==
From 2001 to 2004, he was the POLISARIO Delegate in Madrid, Spain. In August 2004, he was designated as Sahrawi resident ambassador in the United Mexican States, replacing Bachari Saleh.

== Books ==
In 2006 the editorial Sky published his novel "Viaje a la Sabiduría del Desierto" ("Journey to the Wisdom of the Desert"). In 2008, the short story "El Silencioso Debate de los Animales" ("The Animals Silent Debate") was published by Libros de Godot. In 2011, he self-published in Bubok the novel "Los Senderos de la Vida" ("The Paths of Life").
