= Brahim Mojtar =

Sahrawi politician

Brahim Mokhtar ابراهيم مختار
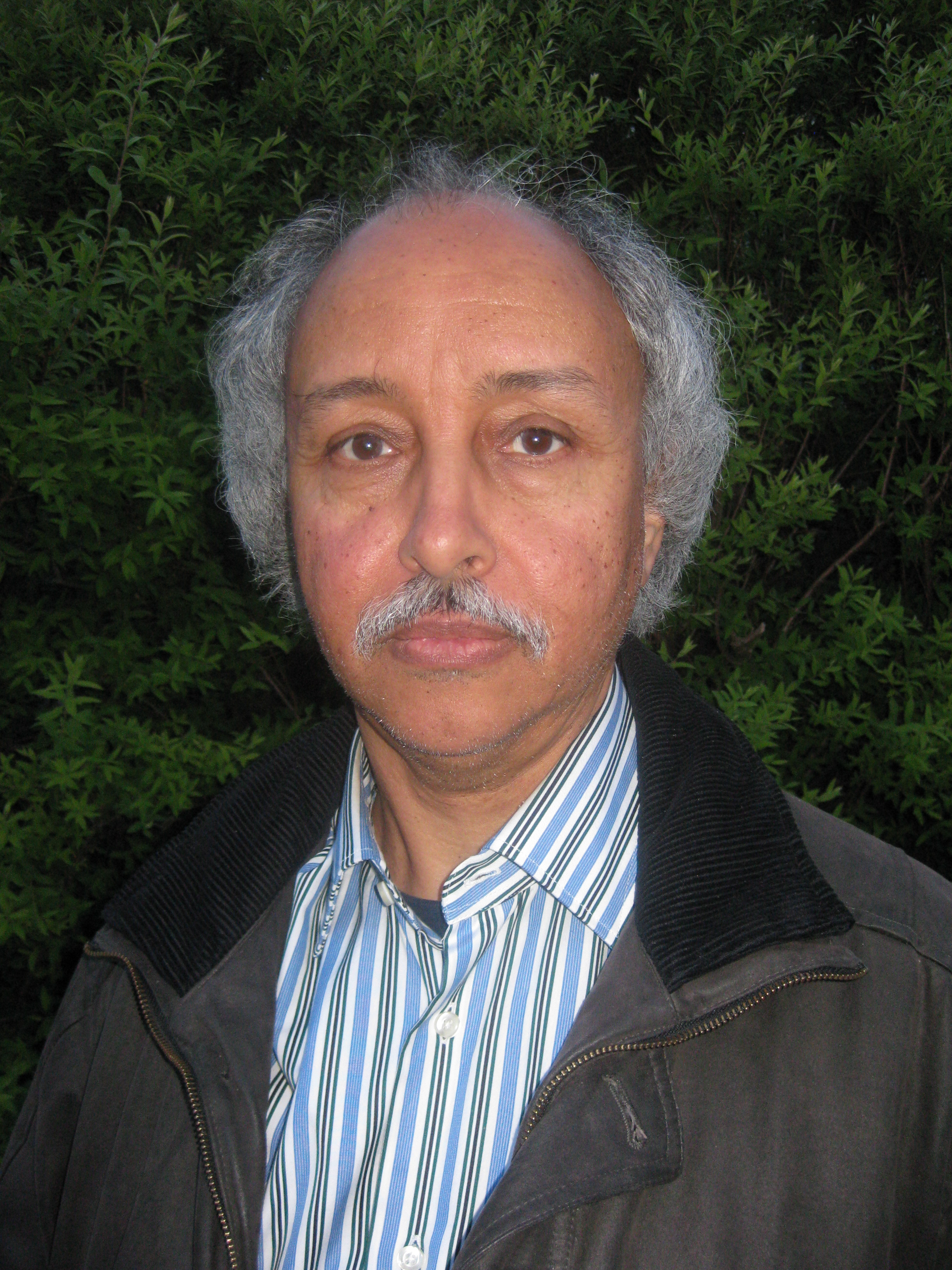
- Born: December 18, 1953; El Aaiun, Spanish Sahara
- Education: University of Málaga, Spain
- Occupations: Diplomat, Politician
- Years active: 1976-present
- Political party: POLISARIO

Brahim Mokhtar Boumakhrouta (born 18 December 1953, in El Aaiun, Western Sahara) is the Sahrawi Arab Democratic Republic Minister of Cooperation. He is a prominent member of the Sahrawi Arab Democratic Republic (SADR) diplomatic corps. He has had several postings around the world, both as Polisario representative and SADR ambassador. He has also held two positions in the SADR government, Secretary General of Government (cabinet position) 2001-2003 and Director of Protocol 2003-2007 of the President Mohamed Abdelaziz.

Mokhtar grew up in El Aaiun and studied economic science at the University of Málaga, Spain. In 1976, he opened the POLISARIO office in Stockholm, Sweden.

== Diplomatic postings ==
- 1976–1978 POLISARIO representative in Stockholm for Nordic countries.
- 1978–1980 Minister Council for West Africa at SADR embassy in Benin.
- 1980–1982 Minister Council for Central America with responsibility for Caribbean islands at SADR embassy in Panama.
- 1982–1987 SADR Ambassador for Mozambique and Southern Africa.
- 1987–1995 SADR Ambassador for Ethiopia, OAU and East Africa.
- 1987–1995 Permanent representative at Organization of African Unity for SADR.
- 1995–2001 POLISARIO representative in London for the United Kingdom & Ireland.
- 2001–2003 Secretary General of Government, SADR Government.
- 2003–2007 Director of Protocol, President of SADR.
- 2007–2012 POLISARIO representative in Stockholm for Nordic countries.
- 2012 SADR Delegate Minister for Africa.
- 2012–current SADR Minister of Cooperation.

Mokhtar has also carried out punctual diplomatic missions in 74 countries on behalf of the Sahrawi Arab Democratic Republic.
