= RASD TV =

- Broadcast area: North Africa, Europe, Americas

Programming
- Languages: Arabic, Spanish

Ownership
- Owner: Polisario Front

History
- Launched: 20 May 2009

Links
- Website: RASD TV

Availability

Streaming media
- RASD TV: Live stream

RASD TV is the Sahrawi state-owned satellite and terrestrial public-service television broadcaster. Its offices are located in the Sahrawi refugee camps of Tindouf Province, Algeria.

== History ==
The channel was established in February 2004, but due to the harsh conditions in the refugee camps, it did not start its regular broadcasting until 20 May 2009. The channel had previously made broadcasting test broadcasts since 2008, through Hispasat satellite.

== Programming ==
RASD TV broadcast daily for four hours by terrestrial signal (for the Western Sahara territory and the refugee camps) and two hours by satellite (for the rest of Africa, Europe and part of the Middle East), with its content, composed of newscasts, interviews, historical documentaries and cultural programs, mostly in Hassaniya and Modern Standard Arabic, but also some in Spanish.

== See also ==
- Radio Nacional de la R.A.S.D.
- Sahara Press Service
