= Bujari Ahmed =

Saharawi diplomat

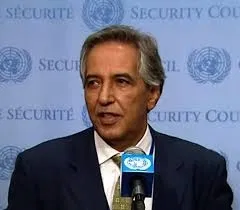
- Bujari Ahmed
- Born: 19 September 1952; Villa Cisneros, Spanish Sahara
- Died: 3 April 2018 (aged 65); Baracaldo, Spain
- Education: University of La Laguna; Complutense University of Madrid
- Occupations: Politic and diplomat
- Children: 5

Bujari Uld Ahmed Uld Barical-la, known as Bujari Ahmed or Boukhari Ahmed (19 September 1952 – 3 April 2018), was an intellectual, politician and Saharawi diplomat and from 1992 until his death in 2018 representative of the Polisario Front at the UN. He was a member of his National Secretariat and considered one of the most important Sahrawi negotiators in the history of the independence movement. He participated in the negotiations with Morocco after the ceasefire under the auspices of the United Nations in 1991. In 1978 he was the first representative of the Polisario Front in Spain.

== Biography ==
He was born on 19 September 1952 in Villa Cisneros, Spanish Sahara. He was the son of Ahmed Uld Barical-la, a notable Saharawi who served in the Spanish administration of the General Government of the Sahara from a young age as an interpreter of the Djema'a, which represented the territory in the Cortes Españolas and one of the pioneering figures of the Sahrawi independence movement and older brother of the also diplomatic Hash Ahmed.

He studied primary and secondary in Villa Cisneros, then a Spanish colony, and moved to Tenerife to continue his university studies. He graduated in Law from the University of La Laguna. Later he studied Political Science at the Complutense University of Madrid. According to the official note of the Polisario Front on the occasion of his death, he joined the independence movement in 1973 and participated in the organization and sensitization of Saharawi students in Spain. He was expelled from Spain and arrived in Tindouf, in Algeria. From there he traveled to Mauritania, later to Tunisia and when it produces the arrival of Morocco to El Aaiún, in 1975, he traveled to Tindouf.

== Diplomatic career ==
He was editor of the newspaper "Sahara Libre" (Sahara Free) (1975-1977) and in 1978 he returned to Madrid as the first representative of the Polisario Front in this country, representation that he assumed until 1980. From 1980 to 1984 he was the first ambassador of the SADR in Panama and in 1982 the first ambassador of the SADR in Costa Rica. From 1984 to 1985 he returned to Spain. His next position in 1985 to 1988 was that of ambassador in Venezuela and shortly after was appointed representative of the Polisario Front for Europe. In 1988 he was the first ambassador of Mexico and later Ambassador in Mission in several countries of Latin America. From 1992 until his death he was a representative of the Polisario Front at the UN headquarters in New York.

He was part of the negotiating delegation that attended several talks and negotiations between the Polisario Front and the Kingdom of Morocco, under the auspices of the United Nations.

In March 2016, he was the host of the Secretary General of the United Nations, Ban Ki-moon, during his visit to Bir Lehlu, in Western Sahara. The visit was the first by a UN Secretary General to the liberated territory of Western Sahara, a fact that was considered one of the most important diplomatic triumphs in the career of the Saharawi diplomat, in addition to the fact that Ban Ki-moon used the term "occupation".

He remained in the post of Saharawi representative at the UN until his death on the night of 3 April 2018. He died in the hospital of Cruces de Baracaldo of lung cancer, detected a few months before. The Saharawi Republic declared seven days of official mourning for his death. As the successor at the head of the Saharawi diplomatic mission at the UN, Mulud Saíd was provisionally appointed.
