= Muhammad Bassiri =

Sahrawi activist

Mohammed Bassiri
- محمد بصيري
- Born: Muhammad Sidi Brahim Sidi Embarek Basir; 1942 or 1944; Tan Tan, Cape Juby, Spanish protectorate in Morocco
- Disappeared: June 18, 1970; El Aaiun, Spanish Sahara
- Status: Presumed dead
- Education: Cairo University, Damascus University
- Occupations: Journalist, Quranic teacher
- Known for: Sahrawi activism
- Movement: Movement for the Liberation of Saguia el Hamra and Wadi el Dhahab

Muhammad Sidi Brahim Sidi Embarek Basir (Arabic: محمد سيدي إبراهيم سيدي مبارك بصير; born 1942 or 1944 – disappeared June 18, 1970) was a Sahrawi nationalist leader, disappeared and presumably executed by the Spanish Legion in June 1970.

== Biography ==
Muhammad Bassiri was born in a Sahrawi family in Tan-Tan, which was ceded to Morocco after the Treaty of Angra de Cintra in 1958, (nowadays Southern Morocco, then part of the Cape Juby in Spanish protectorate in Morocco). The Tarfaya strip, which included Bassiri's hometown, had been attributed to Morocco in a clause imposed by France in the Franco-Spanish Treaty of 1912, despite the fact that Morocco had never had either sovereignty, territorial right or actual control over it, as ruled by the International Court of Justice in 1975. Its cession to Morocco in 1958, which caused a clash between Sahrawi guerrillas and Moroccan troops in Tan-Tan, is interpreted by Sahrawi nationalists as an amputation of their historical territory.

In 1957 Bassiri left Tan-Tan for the newly independent Morocco to attend school in Marrakesh. He proceeded to Cairo, Egypt where he studied the Quran and the Arabic language. In Damascus, Syria, he studied journalism and became familiarized with Pan-Arabism. On returning to Morocco in 1966, he founded Al-Shihab (The Torch), a Sahrawi nationalist newspaper. He also worked as a journalist in Casablanca.

The Sahara has never been Moroccan. The Moroccan kingdom will never be able to justify that the Sahara was part of the Alauit kingdom. Through history, Morocco never sent any Moroccan governor to the Western Sahara, nor have the Saharawis ever pledged loyalty to any Moroccan monarch; there were only commercial relations between Saharawis and Moroccans.

— Muhammad Bassiri,

In March 1968 he was allowed to enter Spanish Sahara (he had tried to enter in December 1967, but he was detained and expelled), and settled in the city of Smara as a Quranic teacher. It was there he started to organize the anti-colonial movement known as the movement of liberation (In Arabic: Harakat Tahrir), calling for end of Spanish occupation of the Sahara. Bassiri stressed non-violence (influenced by the peaceful struggle of Gandhi in the colonized India), and wanted to bring about change through democratic action, although the ruthless colonial rule imposed by Francisco Franco's Spain forced the Harakat Tahrir to remain clandestine. Bassiri didn't want a precipitated independence, but to negotiate with the Spanish authorities.

== Disappearance ==
On early June 17, 1970 the organization appeared openly in a peaceful demonstration against the Spanish colonial rule, asking for autonomy (as a first step to independence) and self-determination in the Zemla neighborhood of El-Aaiun, in parallel to an official Francoist demonstration. The Spanish governor-general of the colony, General José María Pérez de Lema y Tejero, went to Zemla to talk with the organizers of the demonstration, but did not reach an agreement to make them disperse or join the official demonstration. The protest was seen by the Spanish authorities as a defiance to the official demonstration organized by the General governor, made to show the world the supposed Sahrawi support of the Spanish regime and refusal of UN involvement.

Tensions escalated between the growing mass of Sahrawi protesters and the Spanish reservist soldiers, and stones were thrown at the soldiers after they detained three of the protest's speakers. The soldiers answered by opening fire on the protestors at 17:30 PM. The disturbance continued until 19:00 PM, when troops of the Tercio "Juan de Austria" of the Spanish Legion put down what remained of the protesters. These events have been dubbed the Zemla Intifada by Sahrawis.

Bassiri, who had abandoned Zemla before violence erupted, was informed of the events. He was offered an escape to Mauritania by car, but he refused it. According to Salem Lebser, he replied: "Nobody could say I'm an adventurer who has led people to death and then disappeared. I already fled once Morocco, where I felt like a stranger. But I would not flee from my own land." Bassiri was tracked down that night, detained around 03:00 AM of June 18, and jailed at El Aaiun Territorial Police headquarters. On June 19, after being allegedly tortured, he testified before the Spanish military authorities. A photograph of him registering before the "Habs Shargui" prison authorities is the last known trace of him. Later, he was allegedly moved to "Sidi Buya", the Spanish Legion headquarters in El Aaiun. According to testimonies given by three different persons to then apostolic prefect to Spanish Sahara Félix Erviti Barcelona, Bassiri was executed by a Spanish Legion patrol in the dunes surrounding El Aaiun on the night of 29 July 1970, although Spanish authorities of the time claimed that he had been expelled from the territory to Morocco on that date, and they also claimed later that Bassiri had entered Spanish Sahara illegally from Algeria in September 1970. Spanish colonial authorities even claimed in 1971 that Bassiri had died on the Skhirat coup d'état against Hassan II.

Present-day Sahrawi nationalists such as the Polisario Front honor him as the father of the modern Sahrawi independence struggle, as well as the first of the Sahrawi "disappeared" and a national martyr for the Liberty.

== See also ==
- List of people who disappeared
