= Zemla Intifada =

1970 uprising in the Spanish-ruled Moroccan Sahara

- Part of Western Sahara conflict
- Date: 17 June 1970
- Location: El Aaiun, Spanish Sahara
- Goals: Independence of the territory
- Methods: Demonstrations; Rioting

Parties
Sahrawi people; Movement for the Liberation of Saguia el Hamra and Wadi el Dhahab	(Francoist Spain) Government of Spain: Territorial police force; Spanish Legion

Number
~3,000	~100

Casualties and losses
2–11 civilians killed, hundreds wounded or detained	Several injured

The Zemla Intifada (or the Zemla Uprising) is the name used to refer to disturbances of 17 June 1970, which culminated in a massacre (where between 2 and 11 people were killed) by Spanish Legion forces in the Zemla district of El Aaiun, Spanish Sahara (modern-day Western Sahara).

== Demonstration ==
Leaders of the previous secret organization Movement for the Liberation of Saguia el Hamra and Wadi el Dhahab (Harakat Tahrir) called for a demonstration to read out a petition of goals in response against the Spanish occupation of Western Sahara. On 17 June 1970, this petition was read to the Spanish governor-general of the colony, General José María Pérez de Lema y Tejero, peacefully.

== Riot ==
After the demonstration was being dispersed by orders from Spain's governor-general, police moved in to arrest the Harakat Tahrir's leaders. Demonstrators responded to the police's actions by throwing stones at the police. The Spanish authorities called in the Spanish Legion who opened fire on the demonstrators, killing at least eleven people.

== Aftermath ==
In the days following the incident, the Harakat Tahrir's founder Muhammad Bassiri and other Harakat Tahrir activists were hunted down by Spanish security forces. Bassiri disappeared in jail after being arrested in 1970.

The Zemla demonstration led to the end of the Harakat Tahrir. Hundreds of their supporters were arrested, while other demonstrators were deported from Spanish Sahara. The suppression of the Zemla demonstration pushed the Spanish Saharan anti-colonial movement into embracing armed struggle. The militant nationalist organization Polisario Front was formed three years later.
