= Jira Bulahi Bad =

Sahrawi engineer, politician, and activist (born 1965)

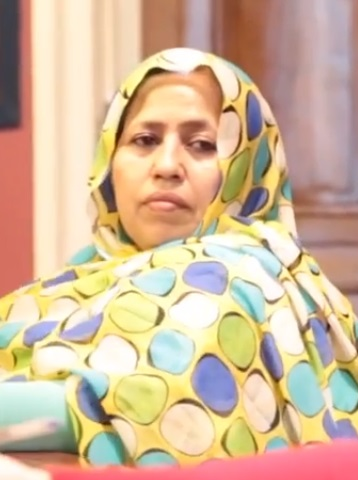
- In 2017, during a meeting with Spanish senators of Unidos Podemos
- Born: 20 June 1965 (age 61)
- Occupations: engineer, politician, and activist

Jira Bulahi Bad (born 20 June 1965) is a Sahrawi engineer, politician, and activist. She is the representative of the Polisario Front in Spain since 2016.

== Biography ==
She was born on 20 June 1965 in El Aaioun, then part of the Spanish colony of Saguia el-Hamra (in turn part of the Spanish Sahara).

Following the Green March mass demonstration in November 1975, Bad fled with her family to Tindouf, Algeria, close to the Mauritanian, Western Saharan, and Moroccan borders. She complete high school in that country and took advantage of a scholarship to study electrical engineering in Cuba. Upon her return, she joined various Sahrawi political and social organizations, such as the Sahrawi Youth Union and the National Union of Sahrawi Women, entities in which she occupied positions of leadership.

In the years that followed her return, Bad occupied herself with international relations. After obtaining a master's degree in International Cooperation at the University of Alicante in Spain, she became the representative of the "Popular de Liberación de Saguía el Hamra y Río de Oro" (English: ("Popular Front for the Liberation of Saguia el-Hamra and Río de Oro", or "Polisario Front") in Sweden for the Nordic countries. She has also served as director for the Department of International Relations and Cooperation.
