= Movement for the Liberation of Saguia el Hamra and Wadi el Dhahab =

Former independentist movement in Spanish Sahara

- Abbreviation: Movement of Liberation (حركة تحرير) Harakat Tahrir
- Formation: December 1969
- Dissolved: June 1970
- Type: Grassroots organization
- Purpose: Independence of then Spanish Sahara from Spanish colonial rule
- Location: Western Sahara
- Region served: Western Sahara
- Members: 4,700 (1970)
- Official language: Hassaniya Arabic, Spanish
- Leader: Muhammad Bassiri

The Movement for the Liberation of Saguia el-Hamra and Wadi el Dhahab, also referred to as the Liberation Movement (Arabic: حركة تحرير, romanized: Harakat Tahrir), Movement for the Liberation of the Sahara, Advanced Organization of the Sahara, or simply the Muslim Party, was a Sahrawi movement created in the late 1960s by Muhammad Bassiri, a Sahrawi journalist and teacher of Qur’an.

Its aim was the peaceful overturning of Spanish colonial rule and achievement of Western Sahara's self-determination. It initially organized and operated in secret, but revealed its existence in a demonstration in El-Aaiun (Laayoune) against Spanish rule in 1970, attempting to hand over a petition to the Spanish colonial rulers calling for better treatment and Western Sahara's independence.

The protest was immediately and bloodily suppressed by the colonial forces. The massacre and ensuing disturbances has been named the Zemla Intifada, or uprising, after the place the demonstration was held. A nationwide hunt for members of the movement followed: Bassiri himself was arrested and "disappeared" in Spanish custody. He is assumed to have been killed by his jailors, and is counted by the present-day Sahrawi nationalist movement as its first modern-day martyr (Morocco, which claims Western Sahara as its own province, has also similarly attempted to appropriate his legacy, arguing that the Harakat Tahrir was primarily interested in ejecting Spain, not in achieving independence as a nation separate from Morocco).

After the crushing of the Harakat Tahrir, Sahrawi nationalists abandoned the hope of a peaceful end to colonial rule. In May 1973 the militant Front Polisario formed under the leadership of El-Ouali, calling for armed revolution against Spanish rule. The Polisario, which is still active, would later turn its guns on the Moroccan and Mauritanian forces which invaded Western Sahara upon Spain's departure in 1975.
