= 17th Congress of the Polisario Front =

Election to renew the leadership of the Polisario Front

- 15–20 January 2027
- Secretary-General election
Secretary-General before election
Brahim Ghali
Polisario Front
Secretary-General-elect
TBD

The 17th Congress of the Popular Front for the Liberation of Saguia El Hamra and Río de Oro (Note: Arabic: المؤتمر السابع عشر للجبهة الشعبية لتحرير الساقية الحمراء ووادي الذهب Spanish: XVII Congreso del Frente Popular para la Liberación de Saguia El Hamra y Río de Oro) will held in the Dajla refugee camp in Tindouf, Algeria between 15 and 20 January 2027 to renovate the governing bodies of the Polisario Front and establish the movement's main lines of action and strategy for the next leadership term.

The Congress will also be used to elect a new Secretary-General for the Polisario Front, which would automatically become the President of the Sahrawi Arab Democratic Republic.

The Congress' slogan is "Unity, resilience and sacrifice to impose the Sahrawi State". (Note: Arabic: وحدة، صمود وتحدٍ لفرض الدولة الصحراوية Spanish: Unidad, firmeza y sacrificio para establecer el Estado Saharaui) The Congress was also named after former Ministry of Defence Abdullah Lahbib Bellal.

The Congress will be the second one to be held in a wartime situation since 1991 after the breakout of the Second Western Sahara War in 2020, and the first to be held after the dissolution of the United Nations Mission for the Referendum in Western Sahara (MINURSO). The Polisario Front declared on 10 November a state of general mobilisation in response to what it described as escalating Moroccan military movements and growing threats to the security and stability of the region.

== Background ==
The National Secretariat extended its term in September 2025 by a year as stipulated by Article 44 of the Basic Law of the Polisario Front, thus postponing the 17th Congress to no later than January 2027.

The Preparatory Committee, presided by Prime Minister Bouchraya Hammoudi Bayoun, was formed on 23 September 2026 and inaugurated on 6 October. He later announced on 11 November that the Congress would be held between 15 and 20 January 2027 in the Dajla refugee camp.

== Election system ==
The Congress elects the National Secretariat, which is the most important decision-making organism inside the Polisario Front when Congresses are not held, and the General-Secretary of the Front, which automatically becomes President of the Sahrawi Arab Democratic Republic.

To be elected Secretary-General of the Polisario Front the following requirements have to be met:

- Being a Sahrawi national.
- Having a militant experience of at least twenty years and have held positions in the national leadership for at least ten years.
- Having military experience during the war.
- Being at least 40 years old.
- Having a clean criminal record.

The candidates are proposed by the Election Commission, and voted on by the Congress. The vote is done by ballot directly and secretly, with a supermajority of at least two-thirds of the vote required to win the first round and an absolute majority for the second round.

Members of the National Secretariat of the Polisario Front shown per method of election. Congress-elected members: 27 seats Secret members of the Occupied Territories: 16 seats General-Secretary of the POLISARIO Front: 1 seat

After the reforms passed by the 16th Congress to the Basic Law of the Polisario Front, the National Secretariat will only have 44 members, of which 27 are directly chosen by the Congress, 16 are anonymously elected by the Occupied Territories to become anonymous members, and the General-Secretary serving as an ex officio member. To become a member of the National Secretariat the following requirements have to be met:

- Being a Sahrawi national.
- Having a clean criminal record.
- Being at least 30 years old.
- Having a university or academic graduation certificate with five years of continuous service or field experience of not less than ten years in one or more of the following positions:
  - Regional personnel in the military or higher.
  - Member of a regional branch or higher. Central Director at Ministry level or higher.
  - Ambassador or representative at the state level.
  - Member of the National Constitutional Council, the Superior Council of the Magistracy and the Consultative Council.
  - Member of the executive office of a mass organization.

The vote is direct and secret, with multiple non-transferable vote being used in the first round and ranked voting in the second one. The winning candidates are those who have obtained the absolute majority of the votes in the first round. In case of impossibility of obtaining the required number of candidates, the electoral commission continues to seek the vote of the congressmen on the basis of a list three times greater than the number of remaining candidates until obtaining the number of required candidates, elected by simple majority. There's a gender quota requiring at least six of the Congress-elected members to be women, while a new quota of six new members was introduced in this Congress before the election of the National Secretariat.
