= Sahara Press Service =

Sahrawi news agency

- Native name: وكالة الأنباء الصحراوية
- Romanized name: Wikālat al-’Anbā’ aṣ-Ṣaḥrāwīyah
- Type: Not-for-profit news agency
- Industry: News media
- Founded: 29 March 1999; 27 years ago
- Headquarters: Shaheed El Hafed, Tindouf, Algeria
- Key people: Editor-in-Chief Saleh Nafee
- Sahara Press Service
- Available in: Arabic; Spanish; French; English; Russian
- Commercial: No
- Current status: Available
- Website: www.spsrasd.info

Sahara Press Service (SPS; Arabic: وكالة الأنباء الصحراوية, romanized: Wikālat al-’Anbā’ aṣ-Ṣaḥrāwīyah, lit. 'Sahrawi News Agency') is the multi-lingual official press agency of the Sahrawi Arab Democratic Republic. The agency mainly report government-related news and current Sahrawi affairs, both from the liberated and occupied territories of Western Sahara, and the Sahrawi refugee camps in Tindouf, Algeria.

== History ==
Sahara Press Service was established on 29 March 1999 with a support from Algeria Press Service in collaboration with the Swiss Association for a Free and Fair Referendum in Western Sahara, known as ARSO, in the midst of interactions resulting from the cease-fire of the Western Sahara War on September 6, 1991. The SPS dispatches began to be posted on the internet since April 1999, due to the combined efforts of the Friends of Sahrawi People in Switzerland and Spain. Among the founders was the journalist and then SADR Minister of Information, Mohamed Fadel Ismail Ould Es-Sweyih. Its current director and editor-in-chief is Saleh Nafee. The Sahara Press Service also releases the El Karama monthly magazine, which reports on human rights violations in the region.

Reports were published only in French until 2001, when the SPS website was opened. In March 2001, news started to be published in Spanish. On April 20, 2003, the news were also published in English on the website. In 2005, SPS added Arabic to the language options of their site. In September 2010, SPS started releasing a weekly news resume bulletin in PDF format. On 1 July 2012 news started to be published in Russian as well.

On 25 January 2012, Sahrawi president Mohamed Abdelaziz inaugurated the new headquarters of the press agency on the Sahrawi refugee camps. SPS launched a new website and logo on 11 October 2023.

== See also ==
- RASD TV
