= José María Pérez de Lema =

Spanish military officer (died 1984)

General José María Pérez de Lema
- Born: José María Pérez de Lema y Tejero
- Died: 12 February 1984; Madrid, Spain
- Spouse: María Dolores Munilla Montero de Espinosa
- Military career
- Allegiance: Spain
- Branch: Spanish Army
- Service years: ?–1978
- Rank: Lieutenant general
- Commands: VI Military Region; Canary Islands
- Conflicts: Spanish Civil War
- Other work: Governor of Spanish Sahara (1967–1971)

José María Pérez de Lema y Tejero (died on 12 February 1984) was a Spanish military officer and colonial administrator, governor of Spanish Sahara, and Captain General of the Canary Islands during the Francoist regime.

== Biography ==
Towards the end of the Francoist regime he held important military positions: Governor-General of Spanish Sahara (1967–1971), Captain General of the VI Military Region (1971–1972), and Captain General of the Canary Islands (1972–1974). In October 1978, holding the rank of lieutenant general, he went into reserve.

== Family ==
He was married to María Dolores Munilla Montero de Espinosa.
