= Mahfoud Ali Beiba =

Sahrawi President in 1976

Mahfoud Ali Beiba Hammad Dueihi
- محفوظ علي بيبا حماد

President of the Sahrawi Republic Acting
- In office 10 June 1976 – 30 August 1976
- Prime Minister: Mohamed Lamine Ould Ahmed
- Preceded by: El-Ouali Mustapha Sayed
- Succeeded by: Mohamed Abdelaziz

Prime Minister of the Sahrawi Republic
- In office 4 November 1982 – 18 December 1985
- In office 16 August 1988 – 18 September 1993
- In office 8 September 1995 – 10 February 1999

Minister for the Occupied Territories
- In office 1999–2005
- Prime Minister: Bouchraya Hammoudi Bayoun; Abdelkader Taleb Omar

President of the Sahrawi National Council
- In office 11 January 1989 – 2 July 2010
- Preceded by: Salem Lebsir
- Succeeded by: Khatri Addouh

Personal details
- Born: 1953 El Aaiún, Spanish Sahara, Spanish West Africa
- Died: 2 July 2010 (aged 56–57) Sahrawi refugee camps, Tindouf province, Algeria
- Cause of death: Heart attack
- Party: POLISARIO
- Spouse: Muieina Chejatu
- Children: Chaiaa, Fala & Mahfuda

Mahfoud Ali Beiba Hammad Dueihi (Arabic: محفوظ علي بيبا حماد; 1953 – July 2, 2010) was a Sahrawi politician and co-founder of the Polisario Front, a national liberation movement that seeks self-determination for Western Sahara. From 1975 until his death, he lived in an exile in the Sahrawi refugee camps in Tindouf, Algeria.

== Youth and background ==
Ali Beiba was born in 1953 in El Aaiún, the capital of the territory then called Spanish Sahara. He studied in several Quranic schools, then the Primary and Secondary education at Spanish colonial schools, although he did not finish his studies because of family issues.

As a child in El Aaiún, the Zemla Intifada occurred, in which an unknown number of Sahrawi civilians were killed by the Spanish Legion in a demonstration.

== Polisario Front ==
In 1972, after hearing about the Sahrawi nationalist demonstrations during the mussem (an event that is both religious festivity and cattle show) of Tan-Tan, he travelled to the former Spanish protectorate, being the nexus between the Sahrawi groups in Western Sahara and Southern Morocco. In the foundation of the POLISARIO, he was designated as the head of the El Aaiún delegation. He also joined the first cell of special operations within the POLISARIO.

In 1974, he was elected as head of the Political Affairs Committee, during the II General Popular Congress of the POLISARIO. He also accompanied El-Ouali Mustapha Sayed, then POLISARIO General Secretary, to the first interview with the Sahrawi National Union Party General Secretary Khelli Henna Ould Rachid in Mauritania.

On the night of February 27, 1976, he was one of the POLISARIO leaders present in Bir Lehlou during the proclamation of independence of the Sahrawi Arab Democratic Republic by the Provisional Sahrawi National Council. Beiba briefly served as the provisional POLISARIO's Secretary-General, the movement's top post, starting on June 10, 1976, as he had constitutionally succeeded the organization's first leader, El-Ouali Mustapha Sayed, who had been killed in combat in Mauritania the day before. After about two months, the III General Popular Congress (GPC) was convened, and in the elections Beiba was replaced by long-standing Sahrawi president Mohamed Abdelaziz, who was last re-elected in 2011.

Following his service as Secretary-General, Beiba held several high-ranking posts in the POLISARIO structure and as a minister of the exile government of the Sahrawi Arab Democratic Republic (SADR), including as Prime Minister in 1982-85 and 1988–93. In 1995-99 he again served as Prime Minister but was forced out of office after the exile parliament, the Sahrawi National Council, brought his government down with a vote of no confidence. He was replaced by Bouchraya Hammoudi Bayoun, who appointed him to the post of minister for the occupied territories. From 2003, Beiba served as president and speaker of the SNC, and in this capacity he was also a member of POLISARIO's executive organ, the National Secretariat. Since 1997, he had been the head of the Sahrawi delegations on the successive negotiations with Morocco.

== Death ==
On July 2, 2010, Beiba suffered a fatal heart attack at his home in the February 27th camp (Sahrawi refugee camps, Tindouf). The SADR presidency declared a week of national mourning in his memory.

On July 4, a group of Sahrawis went to Beiba's family house in El Aaiún to express their condolences and made a collective praying for the deceased. Moroccan police intervened to avoid both the praying and more individuals to come to the house, making some people shouting slogans of support to the POLISARIO and the right of self-determination. Police charged against the protestors who came in with stones and rocks, injuring several of them. The same day, he was buried in a cemetery at the Sahrawi refugee camps, with the presence of the higher authorities of the SADR.

The National Assembly of Panama approved a resolution on July 8 that regretted Beiba's death, calling it an "irreparable loss".

On July 11, Beiba was replaced by Khatri Addouh as president of the SNC.

== Quotes ==
Some selected quotes:

- "We use the strength of law, and they have recoursed to the right of force"
- "Nature never admits the void, as like politics, our cause will have its good end"
- "If the (Spanish) abandonment of the Sahara was a political mistake of the dictatorship, it is logical that democracy repair it now"
- "If Sahrawis vote someday to be Moroccans, I will not be a Moroccan"

== Legacy ==
A group of activists headed by the "Western Sahara Occupied Territories Human Rights Observatory" who had tried since late 2010 to make up a flotilla from the Canary Islands to sail to Western Sahara, similar to the Gaza Freedom Flotilla, had named the expedition as "Independence Flotilla Mahfud Ali Beiba".

The 13th GPC of the Polisario Front, celebrated between 15 and 19 December 2011 in Tifariti, had been named "Martyr Mahfoud Ali Beiba" in his honour.

On July 2, 2012, a promotion of the SPLA Special Forces named "Mahfud Ali Beiba" was graduated on a ceremony held at the Sahrawi refugee camps.

== See also ==
- Abdelkader Taleb Omar
- Politics of Western Sahara
- Mohamed Ali El Admi

Political offices
| Preceded by El-Ouali Mustapha Sayed | President of the Sahrawi Republic; Acting; 1976 | Succeeded by Mohamed Abdelaziz |
| Preceded by Mohamed Lamine Ould Ahmed | Prime Minister of the Sahrawi Republic; 1982–1985 | Succeeded by Mohamed Lamine Ould Ahmed |
| Preceded by Mohamed Lamine Ould Ahmed | Prime Minister of the Sahrawi Republic; 1988–1993 | Succeeded by Bouchraya Hammoudi Bayoun |
| Preceded by Bouchraya Hammoudi Bayoun | Prime Minister of the Sahrawi Republic; 1995–1999 | Succeeded by Bouchraya Hammoudi Bayoun |
