= Prime Minister of the Sahrawi Arab Democratic Republic =

Head of government

- رئيس وزراء الجمهورية العربية الصحراوية الديمقراطية (Arabic); Primer Ministro de la República Árabe Saharaui Democrática (Spanish)
- Coat of arms of the Sahrawi Arab Democratic Republic

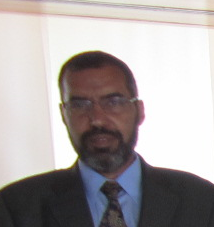
- Incumbent; Bouchraya Hammoudi Bayoun since 13 January 2020
- Type: Head of government
- Residence: Sahrawi refugee camps, Tindouf, Algeria
- Appointer: Brahim Ghali, as President of the Sahrawi Arab Democratic Republic
- Inaugural holder: Mohamed Lamine Ould Ahmed
- Formation: 5 March 1976; 50 years ago

The prime minister of the Sahrawi Arab Democratic Republic is the head of government of the partially recognised Sahrawi Arab Democratic Republic (SADR), a government in exile based in the Sahrawi refugee camps of Tindouf, Algeria. The post of the prime minister has been held by Bouchraya Hammoudi Bayoun since 13 January 2020.

== Prime ministers of the Sahrawi Arab Democratic Republic (1976–present) ==
No.	Portrait	Prime Minister	Took office	Left office	Time in office	Party	Ref.
1	Mohamed Lamine Ould Ahmed	Mohamed Lamine Ould Ahmed (born 1947)	5 March 1976	4 November 1982	6 years, 244 days	Polisario	—
2	Mahfoud Ali Beiba	Mahfoud Ali Beiba (1953–2010)	4 November 1982	18 December 1985	3 years, 44 days	Polisario	—
(1)	Mohamed Lamine Ould Ahmed	Mohamed Lamine Ould Ahmed (born 1947)	18 December 1985	16 August 1988	2 years, 242 days	Polisario	—
(2)	Mahfoud Ali Beiba	Mahfoud Ali Beiba (1953–2010)	16 August 1988	18 September 1993	5 years, 33 days	Polisario	—
3	Bouchraya Hammoudi Bayoun	Bouchraya Hammoudi Bayoun (born 1954)	19 September 1993	8 September 1995	1 year, 354 days	Polisario	—
(2)	Mahfoud Ali Beiba	Mahfoud Ali Beiba (1953–2010)	8 September 1995	10 February 1999	3 years, 155 days	Polisario	—
(3)	Bouchraya Hammoudi Bayoun	Bouchraya Hammoudi Bayoun (born 1954)	10 February 1999	29 October 2003	4 years, 261 days	Polisario	—
4	Abdelkader Taleb Omar	Abdelkader Taleb Omar (born 1951)	29 October 2003	4 February 2018	14 years, 98 days	Polisario	—
5	Mohamed Wali Akeik	Mohamed Wali Akeik (born 1950)	4 February 2018	13 January 2020	1 year, 343 days	Polisario	—
(3)	Bouchraya Hammoudi Bayoun	Bouchraya Hammoudi Bayoun (born 1954)	13 January 2020	Incumbent	6 years, 238 days	Polisario	—

== See also ==
- History of Western Sahara
- List of colonial governors of Spanish Sahara
- President of the Sahrawi Arab Democratic Republic
