= Mohamed Lamine Ould Ahmed =

Prime Minister of the Sahrawi Arab Democratic Republic

- محمد لامين ولد أحمد
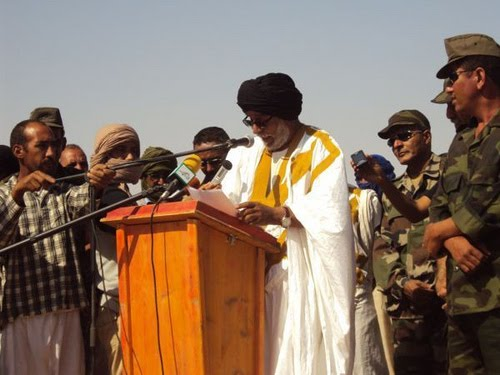
- Ahmed giving a speech at Mahfoud Ali Beiba's funeral in 2010

Minister of Health
- Incumbent
- Assumed office 2 January 2012

Prime Minister of the Sahrawi Arab Democratic Republic
- In office 5 March 1976 – 4 November 1982
- Preceded by: Office Established
- Succeeded by: Mahfoud Ali Beiba
- In office 18 December 1985 – 16 August 1988
- Preceded by: Mahfoud Ali Beiba
- Succeeded by: Mahfoud Ali Beiba

President of the Sahrawi National Council
- In office 1991–1999

Minister of Transportation
- In office 18 September 1999 – 29 October 2003

Minister of Interior
- In office 30 October 2003 – 2007

Personal details
- Born: 1947 (age 78–79) Smara, Spanish Sahara, Spanish West Africa
- Party: POLISARIO
- Parent(s): Moulay Ahmed Ould Mohamed el-Hassan Leili (father), Nouna Mint Abdellahi (mother)

Mohamed Lamine Ould Ahmed (Arabic: محمد لامين ولد أحمد; born 1947) is a Sahrawi politician, writer and member of the Polisario Front.

Since January 2012, he is the Minister of Health of the Sahrawi Republic.

Born in Smara and being one of the founding members of the POLISARIO, Mohamed Lamine Ould Ahmed became the first Prime Minister of the Sahrawi Arab Democratic Republic (SADR) in 1976, and held the post until 1982.

He returned to office in 1985–88 and has been a member of the National Secretariat of the Polisario since. According to Amnesty International, 11 of his family members have been "disappeared" by Moroccan security personnel for political reasons.

Political offices
Preceded by None, inaugural holder	Prime Minister of the Sahrawi Republic; 1976–1982	Succeeded by Mahfoud Ali Beiba
Preceded by Mahfoud Ali Beiba	Prime Minister of the Sahrawi Republic; 1985–1988	Succeeded by Mahfoud Ali Beiba
