= Abdelkader Taleb Omar =

Sahrawi politician and diplomat

- عبد القادر طالب عمر
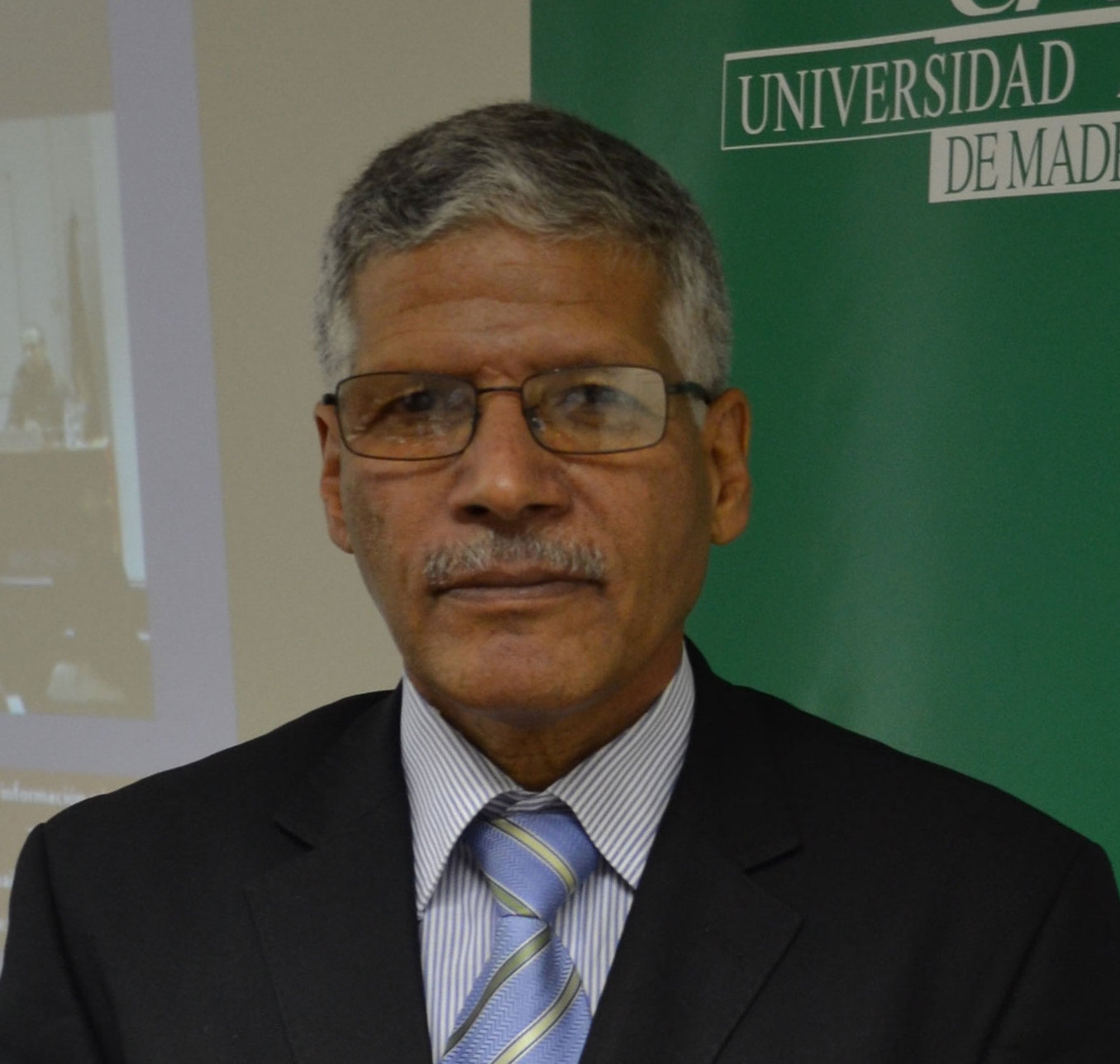
- Omar in 2015

Minister of Education and Vocational Training
- Incumbent
- Assumed office 24 May 2025
- President: Brahim Ghali
- Preceded by: Khatri Addouh

Sahrawi Ambassador to Algeria
- In office 17 March 2018 – 18 May 2025
- President: Brahim Ghali
- Preceded by: Bouchraya Hammoudi Bayoun
- Succeeded by: Khatri Addouh

Prime Minister of the Sahrawi Arab Democratic Republic
- In office 29 October 2003 – 4 February 2018
- President: Mohamed Abdelaziz; Khatri Addouh (Interim); Brahim Ghali
- Preceded by: Bouchraya Hammoudi Bayoun
- Succeeded by: Mohamed Wali Akeik

President of the Sahrawi National Council
- In office 1995–1999
- President: Mohamed Abdelaziz
- Preceded by: Mohamed Lamine Ould Ahmed
- Succeeded by: Salem Lebsir

Personal details
- Born: 1951 (age 74–75) El-Aaiún, Spanish Sahara
- Party: Polisario Front

Abdelkader Taleb Omar (Arabic: عبد القادر طالب عمر) is a Sahrawi politician and diplomat currently serving as the Minister of Education and Vocational Training of the Sahrawi Arab Democratic Republic since 2025. He was ambassador to Algeria from 2018 to 2025, and previously served as Prime Minister.

== Career ==
Omar is a Polisario Front veteran who has lived in exile in the Tindouf province, Algeria since 1975. He has held several ministerial posts in previous governments, served as speaker of the Sahrawi National Council (the parliament in exile) in the 1995-1999 period, and also as Wali (Governor) of the Smara refugee camp, near Tindouf.

He was named to that post of Prime Minister by SADR president Mohamed Abdelaziz, in the framework of the XI General Popular Congress held in Tifariti on 29 October 2003, and re-appointed again to that post in early 2012.

Omar was widely tipped to be the favorite to succeed Mohamed Abdelaziz, to the post of president in 2015, with the Algerian Département du Renseignement et de la Sécurité considered to be preferring him over other candidates. But Abdelkader ruled himself out, paving way for Brahim Ghali, who was serving as the ambassador in Algiers at that time, and was also considered to be close to the Algerian DRS to ascend to that post.

Omar is widely perceived as a liberal, arguing for a return of the United Nations Mission for the Referendum in Western Sahara to Sahrawi territories, as a preclude to the referendum, unlike many other Polisario Front leaders who would prefer an armed resistance against Morocco.

Political offices
Preceded by Bouchraya Hammoudi Bayoun	Prime Minister of the Sahrawi Republic; 2003–2018	Succeeded by Mohamed Wali Akeik
