= Mohamed Abdelaziz (Sahrawi politician) =

Sahrawi President from 1976 to 2016

- محمد عبد العزيز
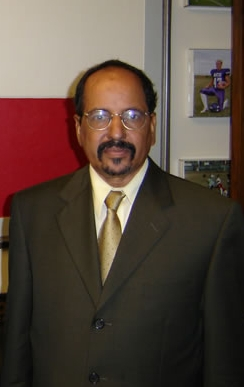
- Abdelaziz in 2005

2nd President of the Sahrawi Republic
- In office 30 August 1976 – 31 May 2016
- Prime Minister: Mohamed Lamine Ould Ahmed; Bouchraya Hammoudi Bayoun; Mahfoud Ali Beiba; Abdelkader Taleb Omar
- Preceded by: El-Ouali Mustapha Sayed; Mahfoud Ali Beiba (acting)
- Succeeded by: Khatri Addouh (acting); Brahim Ghali

Personal details
- Born: Mohamed Abdelaziz ben Khalili ben Mohamed al-Bachir Er-Rguibi; 17 August 1947 Smara, Spanish Sahara
- Died: 31 May 2016 (aged 68) Tindouf, Algeria
- Resting place: Bir Lehlou, Western Sahara
- Party: Polisario Front
- Spouse: Khadidja Hamdi
- Children: 6, including Lehbib Mohamed and Khalil Mohamed
- Education: Mohammed V University

Mohamed Abdelaziz (Note: Arabic: محمد عبد العزيز, romanized: Muhammad ʿAbd al-ʿAziz) (17 August 1947 – 31 May 2016) was a Sahrawi nationalist leader who served as the 3rd Secretary General of the Polisario Front, from 1976, and the President of the Sahrawi Arab Democratic Republic from 1982 until his death in 2016.

== Biography ==
Abdelaziz was born in Marrakesh or in Smara into a Sahrawi family of an eastern Reguibat subtribe, migrating between Western Sahara, Mauritania, western Algeria and southern Morocco.

He was the son of Khalili Ben Mohamed Al-Bachir Rguibi, who was a member of the Moroccan Liberation Army and the Royal Moroccan Army. Abdelaziz's father lived in Morocco with a part of his family and was a member of the Royal Advisory Council for Saharan Affairs. His father held two transport licences in Morocco for buses serving Rabat–Casablanca–Essaouira. The first license was given to him by Hassan II in 1983 and the second by Mohammed VI in 2002. His brother is Mohamed Lahbib Rguibi, lawyer of many Sahrawi human rights activists such as Aminatou Haidar or Naama Asfari, and former "disappeared" in Moroccan prisons between 1976 and 1991.

As a student in the Mohammed V University of Rabat, he gravitated towards Sahrawi nationalism, and became one of the founding members of the Polisario Front, a Sahrawi independence movement in Western Sahara with strong Arab socialist ideas which launched a few attacks against Spanish colonialism in the Spanish Sahara in 1973. Shortly after Spain relinquished control of the area to Mauritania and Morocco in the 1975 Madrid Accords, Polisario declared the Sahrawi Arab Democratic Republic (SADR), leading to the Western Sahara War (1975–1991). From 1976 until his death, Abdelaziz was Secretary-General of the Polisario Front, replacing Mahfoud Ali Beiba, who had taken the post as interim Secretary-General after El-Ouali Mustapha Sayed was killed in action in Mauritania.

Abdelaziz was also the first president of the SADR from August 1982, after a change made in the constitution by the fifth general congress of the Polisario, deciding the post were to be held by the secretary-general of the Polisario.

He lived in exile in the Sahrawi refugee camps in the Tindouf Province of western Algeria. According to some former members of Polisario now aligned with Morocco, Abdelaziz was "chosen" by Algeria at the top of the organization although he did not belong to the very closed circle of the organization's founders and "he always considered himself to be their man." Under Abdelaziz, Polisario continued its guerrilla war against Morocco and Mauritania, until the latter's withdrawal in 1979 and the construction of the Moroccan Wall in 1980s. With the wall limiting attacks, Abdelaziz turned to diplomatic measures to secure SADR's future.

The Organization of African Unity (OAU) seated Western Sahara for the first time in 1982, despite Morocco's vehement objections. This led to Morocco's withdrawal from the OAU two years later. In 1985, Abdelaziz was elected as Vice-President of the OAU at its 21st summit, effectively signalling that the Sahrawi Republic would be a permanent OAU member despite the controversy. When the African Union (AU) replaced the OAU in 2001, Abdelaziz was elected as AU vice-president at its first summit.

In December 2005, as leader of the Polisario Front, he received the Spanish Human Rights Association's "Human Rights International Prize".

Abdelaziz died of lung cancer on 31 May 2016, aged 68, and was buried in the Free Zone town of Bir Lehlou.

== Politics ==
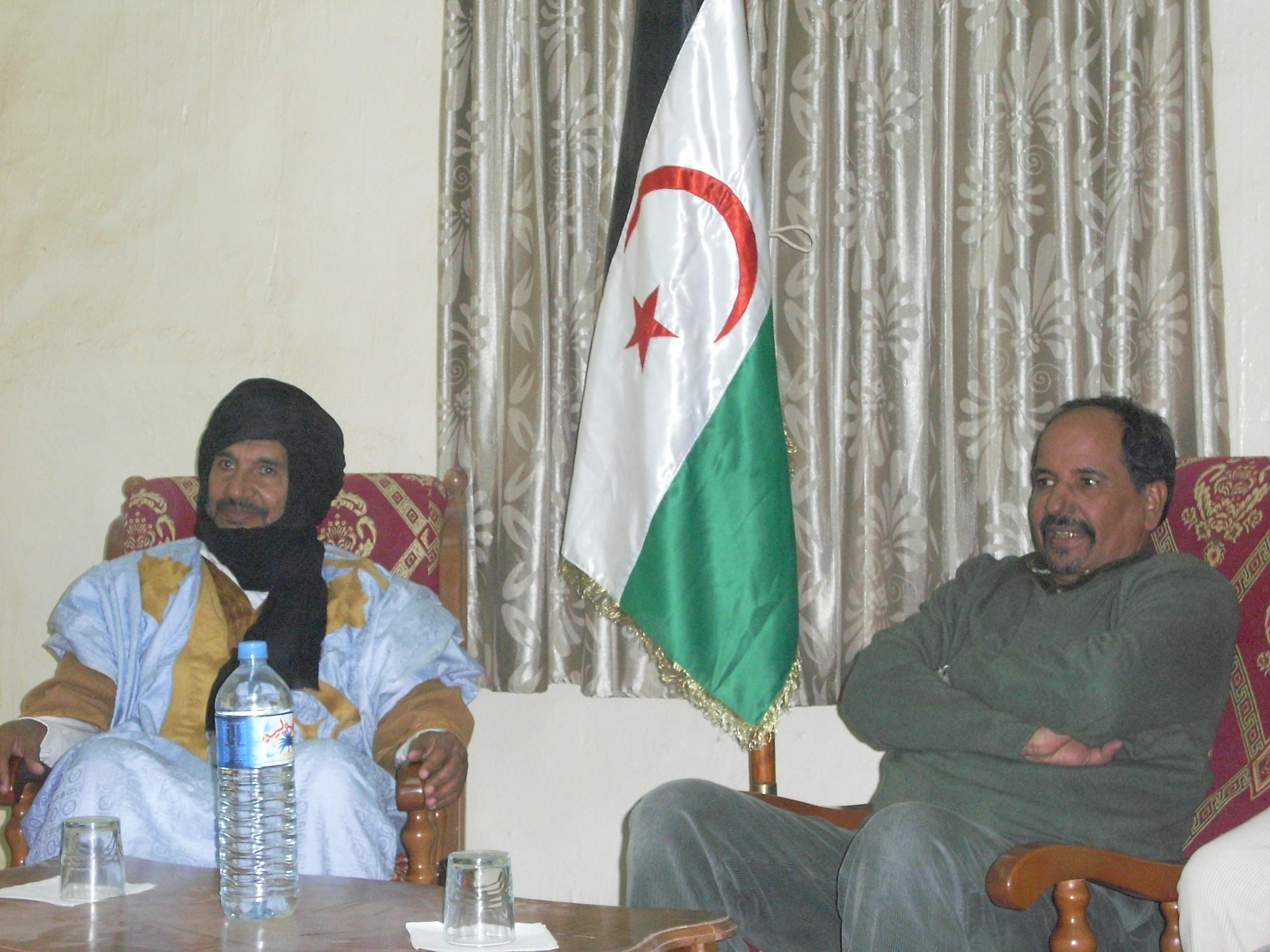
Mohamed Abdelaziz, the former general of the Polisario Front.

Abdelaziz was considered a secular nationalist and steered the Polisario and the Sahrawi republic towards political compromise, notably in backing the United Nations' Baker Plan in 2003.

There was some criticism against Abdelaziz from within the Polisario for preventing reforms inside the movement, and for insisting on a diplomatic course which had gained few concessions from Morocco, rather than re-launching the armed struggle favored by many within the movement. The only supposedly opposition group is the Front Polisario Khat al-Shahid, which states that it wants to continue with militant attacks. Abdelaziz specifically denied the existence of such a group; he maintained that only the Polisario exists in the camps.

Abdelaziz condemned terrorism, insisting the Polisario's guerrilla war is to be a "clean struggle" (that is, not targeting private citizens' safety or property); he however acknowledged mistreatment to Moroccan prisoners of war as well as attacking civilian populations in Moroccan cities by the Polisario Front, justifying this as necessary evils in times of war and that the Polisario had to use every means in order to defend the Sahrawi population from the enemy.

== Notes ==
Political offices
Preceded by Mahfoud Ali Beiba; Acting	President of the Sahrawi Republic; 1976–2016	Succeeded by Khatri Addouh; Acting
