= Bouchraya Hammoudi Bayoun =

Prime Minister of the Sahrawi Arab Democratic Republic

- بشرايا حمودي بيون
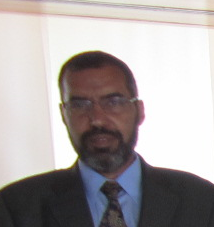
- Bouchraya in 2012

Prime Minister of the Sahrawi Arab Democratic Republic
- Incumbent
- Assumed office 13 January 2020
- President: Brahim Ghali
- Preceded by: Mohamed Wali Akeik
- In office 10 February 1999 – 29 October 2003
- President: Mohamed Abdelaziz
- Preceded by: Mahfoud Ali Beiba
- Succeeded by: Abdelkader Taleb Omar
- In office 19 September 1993 – 8 September 1995
- Preceded by: Mahfoud Ali Beiba
- Succeeded by: Mahfoud Ali Beiba

Sahrawi Ambassador to Algeria
- In office 2016 – 17 March 2018
- Prime Minister: Abdelkader Taleb Omar
- Preceded by: Brahim Gali
- Succeeded by: Abdelkader Taleb Omar

Minister for Economic Development and Commerce
- In office 1995–1999
- Prime Minister: Mahfoud Ali Beiba
- Succeeded by: Larabas Said Joumani

Minister of Interior
- In office 1999–2003
- Prime Minister: Bouchraya Hammoudi Bayoun
- Succeeded by: Mohamed Lamin Dedi

Personal details
- Born: 9 July 1954 (age 72) Dakhla, Spanish Sahara
- Party: POLISARIO
- Education: University of Havana
- Occupation: Diplomat, politician

Bouchraya Hammoudi Bayoun (Arabic: بشرايا حمودي بيون, Spanish: Bucharaya Hamudi Beyún; born 9 July 1954) is a Sahrawi politician and diplomat serving as Prime Minister of the Sahrawi Arab Democratic Republic since 13 January 2020, marking his third term in office. He previously served as ambassador to Algeria.

== Career ==
Bouchraya was born at Dakhla in 1954. He studied economics at the University of Havana, Cuba. He speaks Hassaniya (a variety of Arabic) & Spanish. He has held various positions in the Sahrawi government in exile. He started off his political career as the Minister of Trade and Development, when the former education minister Mohamed Lamine Ould Ahmed became the Prime Minister in December 1985.

He was selected as the Prime Minister in 1993 and served for a two-year term. He then served as the Economic Development & Trade Minister. He subsequently became the Prime Minister again between 1999 and 2003, during which he also served as the Minister of Interior.

Bouchraya called for a renewed emphasis on United Nations Mission for the Referendum in Western Sahara's mandate during his second Prime Ministerial tenure and pledged to accept the outcome of a free referendum regardless of whether the popular opinion was for integrating with Morocco. He was also critical of the new king Mohammed VI of Morocco, who he claimed was violating the rights of the Sahrawi people.

Bouchraya was appointed as the POLISARIO representative for Spain in 2008 replacing Brahim Ghali, who became the Sahrawi Republic ambassador in Algiers. When Brahim Ghali became the president of SADR, Bouchraya replaced him as the SADR representative at Algiers.

Political offices
Preceded by Mahfoud Ali Beiba	Prime Minister of the Sahrawi Republic; 1993–1995	Succeeded by Mahfoud Ali Beiba
Preceded by Mahfoud Ali Beiba	Prime Minister of the Sahrawi Republic; 1999–2003	Succeeded by Abdelkader Taleb Omar
Preceded by Mohamed Wali Akeik	Prime Minister of the Sahrawi Republic; 2020–present	Incumbent
