= Music of Western Sahara =

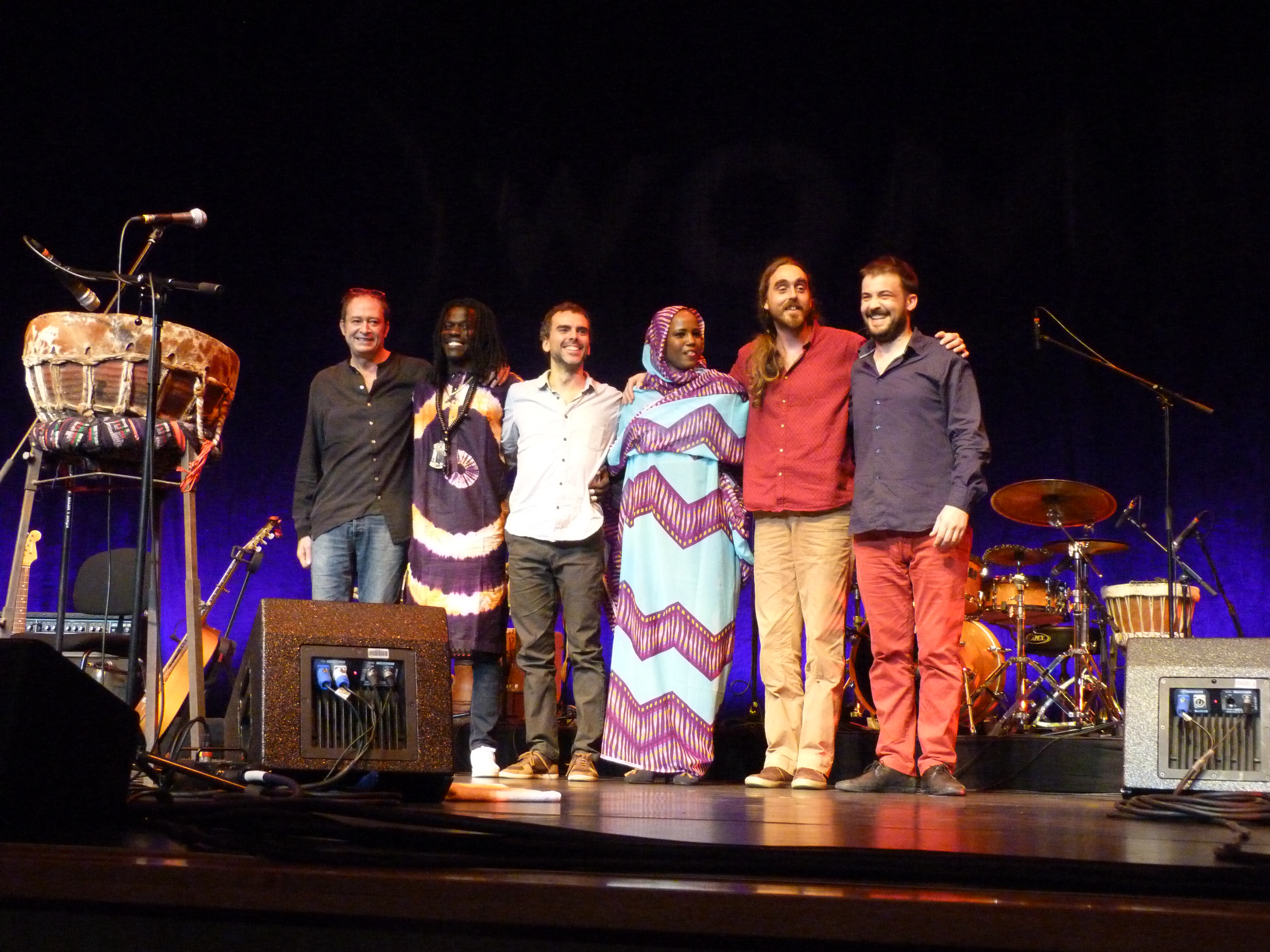
Aziza Brahim and Gulili Mankoo (band) - WOMEX 15, Budapest

The inhabitants of the Western Sahara have created both traditional as well as modern music styles. Sahrawi music shares much in common with neighbouring musical traditions, such as those of Mauritania and southern Morocco, and retains aspects of pre-colonial heritage.

The tbal is the basic percussion instrument, while the traditional string instrument called Tidinit, has largely been replaced by the electric guitar. Some performers are tribespeople who lived a nomadic existence before the Western Sahara War against Morocco between 1975 and 1991, which was true of the family of Mariem Hassan.

The first Sahrawi music album, titled Polisario vencerá, was recorded live in Barcelona, in 1982 by the band Shahid El Uali. From 1998, Nubenegra (a Spanish music label) marketed several Sahrawi music CDs in the United States and Germany, with a first release of a three-disc box titled Sahrauis: The Music of the Western Sahara. Featured artists in the compilation were singers Mariem Hassan and Aziza Brahim, Leyoad, and guitarist Nayim Alal. In 2000, American label Rounder Records released their own compilation Starry Nights in Western Sahara. In 2003 Nubenegra edited the album Nar (Fire) from guitarist and singer Nayim Alal.

In 2002 Mariem Hassan and Leyoad released a collaboration album, Mariem Hassan con Leyoad. Then, in 2005 Nubenegra edited Mariem Hassan's first solo album, titled Deseos (Wishes). In 2009, her album Shouka (Thorn) was published. Her last work, El Aaiun egdat (El Aaiun on fire) was released in 2012.

On November 8, 2007 Tiris released the album Sandtracks on British label Sandblast Records. In 2007, the American label Sublime Frequencies edited the album Guitar Music from Western Sahara, from the Dakhla-based band Group Doueh. In June 2009, Group Doueh released the album Treeg Salaam (Streets of Peace).

In 2008, Aziza Brahim released her first EP with the French label Reaktion, titled Mi Canto (My Singing). Her LP Mabruk with her band Gulili Mankoo was scheduled for June 2012.

Some Sahrawi musicians have settled in Dakar, where they have played with musicians from West Africa.

== Notable Western Sahrawi musicians ==
- Aziza Brahim
- El Wali
- Mariem Hassan
- Najm Allal
- Tiris
