= Mabruk (album) =

Studio album by Aziza Brahim
- Released: 11 June 2012
- Genres: Sahrawi music, Folk, World
- Length: 60:56
- Label: Reaktion
- Producer: Aziza Brahim

Aziza Brahim chronology
O.S.T. Wilaya (2011)	Mabruk (2012)	Soutak (2014)

Professional ratings
Review scores
Source	Rating
Mondomix	5/5 stars
Les Inrockuptibles	3/5 stars
Global Sounds	4/5 stars
Songlines	4/5 stars

Mabruk is the first LP of Sahrawi singer Aziza Brahim, after her 2008 EP Mi Canto. The album is accompanied by a 16-page booklet which includes French translation of the songs, and a text by Sahrawi writer Bahia Mahmud Awah on the history of their people. It was elected as 2012 World Music Album of the Year by the Dutch magazine Heaven.

== Track listing ==
No.	Title	Length
1.	"Marhabna"	3:21
2.	"Ard El Salam"	5:18
3.	"Wilaya Blues"	5:03
4.	"Hamid Rabi"	4:24
5.	"Invasores"	4:56
6.	"Laaiún Ezeina"	5:07
7.	"Mohamed Yislim"	5:25
8.	"Liberación de Guelta"	4:04
9.	"Ya Mulana"	5:24
10.	"Sensación Del Tanque"	4:15
11.	"La Tierra Derrama Lágrimas"	4:54
12.	"Regreso"	3:39
13.	"Machair"	2:58

International release bonus track
No.	Title	Length
14.	"Lamentos"	2:08
