= Equatoguinean literature =

Location of Equatorial Guinea.

Equatorial Guinea was the only Spanish colony in Sub-Saharan Africa. During its colonial history between 1778 and 1968, it developed a tradition of literature in Spanish, unique among the countries of Africa, that persists to the present day.

The literature of Equatorial Guinea in Spanish is relatively unknown, unlike African literature in English, French, and Portuguese. For example, M'bare N'gom, a professor at Morgan State University, searched 30 anthologies of literature in Spanish published between 1979 and 1991 and did not find a single reference to Equatoguinean writers. The same thing occurs in anthologies of African literature in European languages published in the 1980s and in specialized journals such as Research in African Literatures, African Literature Today, Présence Africaine or Canadian Journal of African Studies. This began to change in the late 1990s with the publication of a monograph in the journal Afro-Hispanic Review, and with the conferences Spain in Africa and Latin America: The Other Face of Literary Hispanism at the University of Missouri in Columbia, Missouri in May 1999 and Primer Encuentro de Escritores africanos en Lengua Española ("First Encounter with African Writers in the Spanish Language") in Murcia, Spain in November 2000.

== Predecessors ==
The first references to Africa in literature began in the 15th century with Portuguese and Spanish exploration of the Atlantic. This period was one of exploration and conquest, and the literature written then contains travel accounts, memoirs, chronicles, and reports.

The next period, one of occupation and exploitation, is characterized by colonial literature. The central theme of this literature is a savage, wild Africa; The protagonists are idealized white characters with a negative, paternalistic vision of the Africans, who are portrayed as inferior beings. These novels were written for the audience of the colonialists, not a local audience, and were used as justification for colonialism.

== Beginnings ==
The beginnings of Equatoguinean literature in Spanish are connected with La Guinea Española (Spanish Guinea), the missionary journal of the seminary of the Sons of the Immaculate Heart of Mary on the island of Bioko. This journal, which was founded in 1903, was profoundly colonialistic and directed to a white audience; it did not include contributions from Guinean writers. However, in 1947 a new section was added in which writers recorded local stories and myths to "preserve and disseminate" them (their ultimate purpose was to become better acquainted with the Equatoguinean peoples in order to "civilize" them, or assimilate them into white culture). This gave the African Guinean students of the seminary an opportunity to become writers for the journal; at first, they merely transcribed the local oral tradition of the griot or jeli, but gradually, their writing became a bridge between African oral tradition and European written tradition. Among these writers are Esteban Bualo, Andrés IKuga Ebombebombe, and Constantino Ocha'a Mve Bengobesama; they maintained a strong ethnographic component in their writing, but they also set the stage for a new native literature.

The first Equatoguinean novel was Cuando los combes luchaban (Novela de costumbres de la Guinea Española) (When the Kombes Fought: A novel of the customs of Spanish Guinea), by Leoncio Evita Enoy (Udubuandyola, Bata, 1929–), edited in 1953. The novel takes place in Río Muni, among the Kombe or Mdowe ethnic group (that of the author), in a precolonial era. It is written from the point of view of the protagonist, a white Protestant missionary; on occasion, he is used by the author to contrast European civilization with the savagery of African customs, which are explained in detail. This rejection by the author of his own identity, classified under the so-called "literature of consent," was widely used by the Spanish colonial authorities as an example of the civilizing effect of African colonization.

In 1962, the second Equatoguinean novel, Una lanza por el Boabí ("A Spear for the Boabi"), by Daniel Jones Mathama (San Carlos, 1913?-?), was published; it is sometimes erroneously considered to be the first. The protagonist of this novel, Gue, is an African who tells the story of his life. The writing has an autobiographical character; for example, the character Boabi, Gue's father, is based on Maximiliano C. Jones, Daniel Jones Mathama's father, who was a local authority sympathetic to the colonial government. The plot follows Gue's childhood in Fernando Pó, his move to Spain and his return to Guinea after his father's death. From the ethnographic point of view, the novel is very interesting, detailing the customs of the Bubi ethnicity of the island of Bioko. It may also be classified as part of the "literature of consent," since Boabi is the perfect example of a savage who is civilized by contact with the colonizers: "it is an inescapable duty to proclaim far and wide the great work that Spain is doing on that island."

Between 1962 and 1968, the year of Equatorial Guinea's independence, no important works were published; however, some authors continued to edit stories, legends, and ethnographies in various journals: Marcelo Asistencia Ndongo Mba, Constantino Ochaá, Ángel Nguema, Rafael María Nzé, and Francisco Obiang.

In contrast to other African literary traditions, no anticolonial works or works about combat appeared, and poetry did not attain great importance. Also, the authors of the time period attempted to reach the audience of the colonial power, not the local audience.

== Independence and exile ==
These small shoots of a literary tradition were uprooted when, only months after being democratically elected, Francisco Macías Nguema installed a dictatorship, termed "Afro-fascist" by the historian Max Liniger-Goumaz. As a result of this regime of terror, a third of the Equatoguinean population had gone into exile in neighboring countries or in Spain by the mid-1970s. The writer Juan Balboa Boneke referred to this as the "lost generation."

Madrid and the other places where the diaspora settled were foreign and sometimes hostile lands, which is reflected in the literature. Madrid was not like Paris was for African authors of the 1930s; there was no support for artistic endeavors or for public speech about the Guinean tragedy. The works of this time period circulated on single sheets of paper or in notebooks, or in limited-edition magazines and leaflets published by the refugees; consequently, this literature did not reach the Guinean public or the Spanish public. These pieces were usually written in poetic form and carried a forceful message, as shown by the poem "Vamos a matar al tirano" (Let Us Kill the Tyrant) by Francisco Zamora Loboch, or sometimes a message of nostalgia for the writers' homeland, such as the poem "¿Dónde estás Guinea?" (Where are you, Guinea?) by Juan Balboa Boneke.

Writers from the diaspora also wrote narratives of exile: for example, El sueño (The Dream) and La travesía (The Crossing) by Donato Ndongo-Bidyogo (Niefang, Río Muni, 1950–), La última carta del Padre Fulgencio Abad, C. M. F. (The Last Letter of Father Fulgencio Abad, C. M. F.) by Maplal Loboch (1912–1976), and Bea by Francisco Zamora Loboch (Santa Isabel, 1947–). These stories focus on the violent uprooting, both physical and spiritual, of the protagonist, connected with the history of the African continent before independence.

Also, essays were written that focused on the political situation in Equatorial Guinea and the tragedy of its people; for example, Historia y tragedia de Guinea Ecuatorial (History and tragedy of Equatorial Guinea) (1977) by Donato Ndongo-Bidyogo and ¿Dónde estás Guinea? (Where are you, Guinea?) (1978) by Juan Balboa Boneke.

Raquel Ilombé (Corisco, 1938–1992) (pen name for Raquel del Pozo Epita), whose mother was Guinean and whose father was Spanish, is a unique figure in this movement. Ilombé moved away from Guinea before she was a year old, grew up in Spain, and returned to Guinea after she was married to search for her roots. She wrote a collection of poems entitled Ceiba (Kapok) between 1966 and 1978; its theme is the search for identity, not personal suffering or the trauma of exile.

== After 1979 ==
After Macías Nguema was overthrown by his nephew Teodoro Obiang, who is still president, the culture of the country began to recover slowly.

=== 1981–84 ===
M'bare N'gom divides the most recent time period into two stages. The first stage began in 1981 with the publication of the first children's book, Leyendas guineanas (Guinean Legends) by Raquel Ilombé. Ilombé had to travel through the most remote areas of the country to compile the material for the eight legends that make up her book.

Also from this time period are O Boriba (The exile) (1982) and Susurros y pensamientos comentados: Desde mi vidriera (Comments on Whispers and Thoughts: From my window) (1983), both by Juan Balboa Boneke. Both are volumes of poetry; in some poems, the author frequently mixes words in the Bubi language, the native language of his ethnic group, with Spanish, and other poems are written completely in Bubi. The books focus on the exile and suffering of the Bubi people, persecuted by Nguema's regime.

At the end of this period, Antología de la literatura guineana (Anthology of Guinean Literature) (1984), by Donato Ndongo-Bidyogo, was published. It is the first anthology of its kind, containing the best of Equatoguinean literature then written, both poetry and prose, whether previously published or not. The volume includes many authors who have not published again; the only woman included in the anthology is Raquel Ilombé.

=== 1984–present ===
The second stage of the literary renaissance in Equatorial Guinea is related to the creation of the Center for Hispanic-Guinean Culture in Malabo in 1982. The Center contains a library and performs many cultural activities; it publishes its own quarterly magazine about cultural issues, Africa 2000, and has its own publishing house, Center for Hispanic-Guinean Culture Publishing, dedicated to Guinean writers, both established figures and young talents. Some notable narrative works that it has published include El amigo fiel (The Faithful Friend) (1987) by Ana Lourdes Sohora, Afén, la cabrita reina (Afén, the Little Goat Queen) (1989) and La última lección del venerable Emaga Ela (The Last Lesson of the Venerable Emaga Ela) (1991) by Antimo Esono Ndongo, and Boote-Chiba (1990) by Pedro Cristino Bueriberi. Poetic works include Gritos de libertad y de esperanza (Shouts of Liberty and Hope) (1987) by Anacleto Oló Mibuy and Delirios (Delirium) (1991) by María Nsué Angüe.

The authors of this second stage are characterized by their use of themes that relate to their lives in one way or another, which are often reinterpreted to depict the reality of Equatorial Guinea in symbolic form.

In 1985, Ekomo by María Nsué Angüe, the first novel written by an Equatoguinean woman, was published. The plot is centered on Nnanga, a Bantu woman, but it is told from the point of view of a man, Ekomo – a maneuver that allows the author more freedom to criticize the patriarchal world of postcolonial Africa. Nnanga, trapped between a past full of tradition and patriarchal oppression and a promising future, tries to find her own identity.

That same year, Juan Balboa Boneke published the novel El reencuentro. El retorno del exiliado (The reunion. The return of the exile). The novel, which is partly autobiographical, depicts the protagonist's return to Equatorial Guinea after eleven years of exile in Spain. It portrays the protagonist's expectations and good will with which he returns to the country to aid in its reconstruction and reintegrate into its society. The novel ends with his voluntary return to Spain.

Voces de espumas (Voices from the surf) (1987), by Ciriaco Bokesa, was the first book of poetry written on Guinean land by an Equatoguinean writer. The poems recount the suffering and the silence of the author, as well as personal reflections on poetry. That same year, Juan Balboa Boneke published his first anthology of poetry, Sueños en mi selva (Dreams in my jungle). Balboa Boneke, through his representation of the suffering of Guinea, transcends the provincialism that had characterized the country's poetry before then.

In 1987, Las tinieblas de tu memoria negra (The darkness of your black memory), a novel by Donato Ndongo-Bidyogo, was published. It also contains autobiographical themes, although the author considers it an autobiography of his generation. It depicts a child in Río Muni during the end of the colonial era. The innocent vision of the child allows the author to depict his own sharp and ironic vision of the contradictions of the colonial regime.

== Authors ==
Some recent authors:

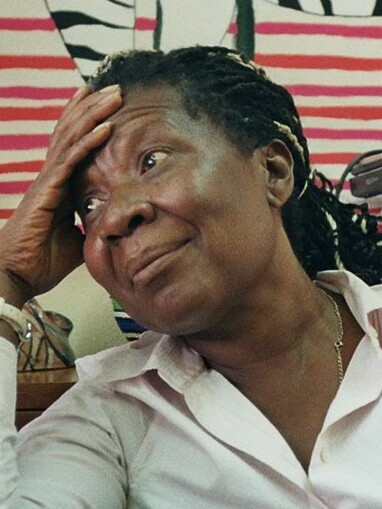
- María Nsué Angüe
  Antimo Esono (1954–1996)
- María Nsué Angüe (1945-2017)
- Juan Balboa Boneke (1938–2014)
- Juan Tomás Ávila Laurel (born 1966)
- Donato Ndongo-Bidyogo (born 1950)
- Raquel Ilombé (c. 1938–1992)
- Constantino Ocha'a Mve Bengobesama (died 1991)
- Mercedes Jora
- Gerardo Behori
- Juan Manuel Jones Costa
- A. Jerónimo Rope Bomabá
- Joaquín Mbomio
- Justo Bolekia Boleká
- Maximiliano Nkogo
- Leoncio Evita Enoy (1929–1996)
- Jose Eneme Oyono (born 1954)
- Remei Sipi (born 1952)

== See also ==
- Western Saharan literature in Spanish

== Additional references ==
- This article draws heavily on the corresponding article in the Spanish-language Wikipedia, which was accessed in the version of May 30, 2008.
- Ndongo-Bidyogo, Donato: Antología de la literatura guineana. Madrid: Editora Nacional, 1984.
- Ndongo-Bidyogo, Donato y Ngom, Mbaré (eds.): Literatura de Guinea Ecuatorial (antología). Madrid : SIAL, 2000.
- Ngom Faye, Mbaré: Diálogos con Guinea: panorama de la literatura guineoecuatoriana de expresión castellana a través de sus protagonistas. Madrid: Labrys 54, 1996.
- Onomo-Abena, Sosthène y Otabela Mewolo, Joseph-Désiré: Literatura emergente en español: literatura de Guinea Ecuatorial. Madrid: Ediciones del Orto, 2004.
