= Western Saharan literature in Spanish =

Body of contemporary writing

Western Saharan literature in Spanish is a small body of writing which has emerged in contemporary times mainly in the form of lyrics written by singers who have chosen the Spanish language as their medium and who use the Saharan Spanish dialect.

== Linguistic and historical context ==
This choice of the Spanish language as Western Saharan songwriters' medium of expression reflects the fact that, together with Equatorial Guinea, where a more sizeable Spanish language literature has emerged, Western Sahara was formerly a colony of Spain, and the principal language of that country has remained as a widespread lingua franca.

== Writers ==
Some of the better-known writers of Spanish language lyrics from Western Sahara include:

- Mariem Hassan
- Nayim Alal

== See also ==
- Mariem Hassan § Use of Spanish in lyrics
- Nayim Alal § Use of Spanish in lyrics
- Equatoguinean literature in Spanish
- List of African writers by country § Western Sahara
