= Listen to the Band =

Listen to the Band may refer to:

- "Listen to the Band" (song), a song by The Monkees
- Listen to the Band (album), a 1991 box set by The Monkees
- Listen to the Band, a 1975 album by The Glitter Band
- Listen to the Band, a BBC Radio programme which was broadcast on BBC Radio 2

== See also ==
- Listen to the Banned, a compilation album of the music of banned, censored and imprisoned artists
