= Tiris =

Tiris (Arabic: تيرس) may refer to:

== Geography ==
- Tiris Zemmour
- Tiris al-Gharbiyya (Western Tiris)

== Other ==
- Tiris (band)
- TIRIS, Texas Instruments Registration and Identification System
