= Echoes of Valhalla =

2017 non-fiction book by Jón Karl Helgason

Echoes of Valhalla: The Afterlife of the Eddas and Sagas
- Author: Jón Karl Helgason
- Translator: Jane Appleton
- Publisher: Reaktion Books
- Publication date: 2017
- ISBN: 978-1-780-23715-2
- OCLC: 978446995

Echoes of Valhalla: The Afterlife of the Eddas and Sagas is a non-fiction book by Jón Karl Helgason. An English-language version, translated by Jane Appleton, was published by Reaktion Books in 2017. The books describes the legacy of Icelandic mythology and sagas and their impact on modern works.
