= Monsters under Glass =

2018 non-fiction book by Jane Desmarais

Monsters under Glass: A Cultural History of Hothouse Flowers from 1850 to the Present
- Author: Jane Desmarais
- Publisher: Reaktion Books
- Publication date: August 2018
- Pages: 256
- ISBN: 978-1-780-23975-0

Monsters under Glass: A Cultural History of Hothouse Flowers from 1850 to the Present is a non-fiction book by Jane Desmarais. Published in 2018 by Reaktion Books, the book discusses horticulture and gardening in the Victorian era, as well as its influence on Victorian art, literature, and culture. Reviews of the book praised Desmarais's writing and analysis of Victorian texts, though noted that, despite the book's title, it did not include much material about 20th or 21st century botany.
