= Mariem Hassan =

Sahrawi singer (1958–2015)

Mariem Hassan مريم منت الحسان
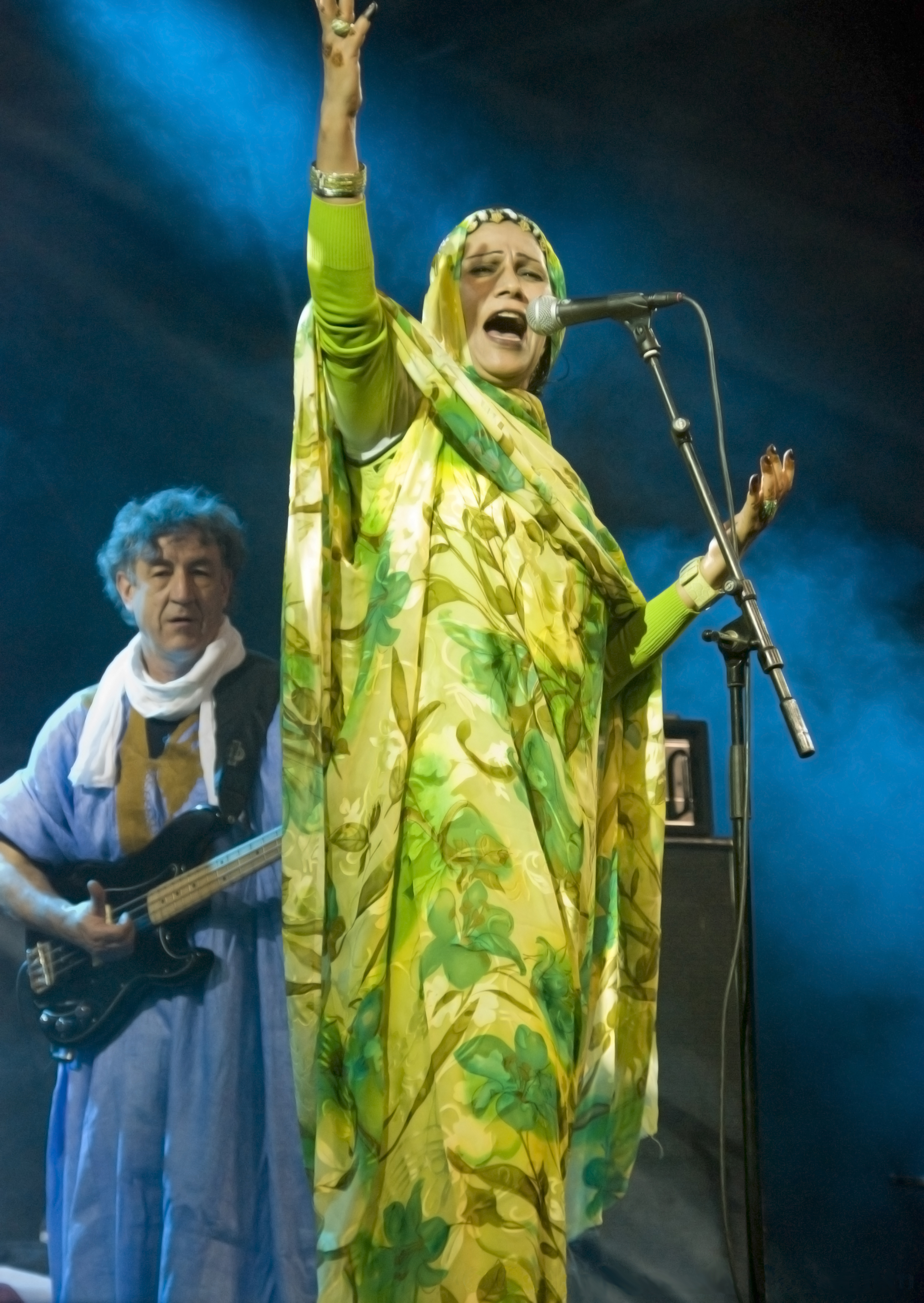
- Mariem Hassan in 2008

Background information
- Also known as: Voice of the Sahara
- Born: 15 May 1958; Uad Tazua, Spanish Sahara
- Died: 22 August 2015 (aged 57) Sahrawi refugee camps, Tindouf, Algeria
- Genres: Blues music, folk music, roots music
- Occupations: Musician, songwriter
- Instruments: Vocals, percussion
- Years active: 1976–2015
- Label: Nubenegra
- Website: web.archive.org/web/20170911134618/http://mariemhassan.com/

Mariem Mint Hassan (Arabic: مريم منت الحسان; 15 May 1958 – 22 August 2015) was a Sahrawi singer and lyricist. She usually sang in Hassaniya, an Arabic variant spoken mostly in Western Sahara and Mauritania, occasionally singing in Saharan Spanish.

== Biography ==
=== Life ===
Mariem Hassan was born in May 1958 in Uad Tazua, 20 km. away from Smara, Spanish Sahara. She was the third of ten siblings in a nomadic family. Music and poetry was important in the family and various relatives were singers, poets or dancers. In 1975, following the Green March and the Madrid Accords which ceded the territory to Morocco and Mauritania, she went with her family, first to Meharrize and finally to the Sahrawi refugee camps in Tindouf, Algeria, where she worked as nurse. Three of her brothers were killed during the Western Sahara War.

She lived there until 2002, when for work and health reasons she moved to Spain, first to Barcelona and then to Sabadell, where she lived with her husband and sons. She returned to Western Sahara some time prior to her death in 2015.

=== Career ===
In early 1976, Hassan joined the musical group Shahid El Hafed Buyema, which, following the death in combat of El-Ouali Mustapha Sayed, first president of the Sahrawi Arab Democratic Republic, became Shahid El Uali. She travelled with the band to many countries, playing at cultural events and headlining a number of world music festivals.

In 1998, Shadid El Uali disbanded, and Hassan started her solo career with a pair of songs on the album Sahrauis: The Music of the Western Sahara (A pesar de las heridas), released by the Spanish label Nubenegra. For the following concerts in Europe, she was accompanied by the group Leyoad (in which Nayim Alal plays the guitar). Following the success of their live performances, they recorded in 2000 a collaboration album, Mariem Hassan con Leyoad (in 2002).

In 2004, she contributed to the album Medej, followed by extensive touring in Europe (Barcelona, Madrid, Leipzig, Helsinki, Brussels, Zurich, Antwerp). Just before departing for her European tour, she received a diagnosis of breast cancer. She began receiving treatment after returning to Spain, staying there on a permanent basis due to the disease.

In 2005, her real first solo album was released. Deseos (Wishes), a personal interpretation of the traditional Haul music. It does not reveal the tragedies happening during its recording: the death from leukemia of Baba Salama (producer of the album and lead guitarist) before the album was published and Hassan's struggle with breast cancer. In March 2005, she was hospitalized in Spain for treatment. One of the highlights of the album is the "desert blues" song "La Tumchu anni".

Hassan performed at the WOMEX 2005 in Newcastle upon Tyne, and in several editions and locations of WOMAD festival, as WOMAD Las Palmas de Gran Canaria 2008, WOMAD Cáceres 2008, WOMAD Charlton Park 2009, WOMAD Sicily 2009, WOMADelaide 2010 and WOMAD New Zealand 2010.

In 2010, a new album was published. Shouka (The Thorn) represented a deep approach to the Haul and even the roots of Azawan music, but also with western influences. The main song "Shouka" is structured as a cantata, touching all the rhythms of the Sahrawi traditional music, in which Mariem gives a response paragraph by paragraph to the 1976 speech of Felipe González at the Sahrawi refugee camps. Some critics compared her sound with Tuareg bands like Tinariwen, while others denied similarities.

In March 2011, she performed for three consecutive days in Caracas during the "Sahrawi Cultural Week".

In late March 2012, her third solo album titled El Aaiun Egdat (El Aaiun on fire), inspired by the Sahrawi protests during and after the Gdeim Izik protest camp and the "Arab Spring", was published. This work marked a musical change, including blues and jazz sounds to the traditional haul structures. Several songs had lyrics written by old Sahrawi poets in exile, like Ali Bachir and Lamin Allal. A European tour for the album began at the World Village Festival in Helsinki on 27 April. In June, she played with her band in Chiasso Her album El Aaiun Egdat reached from the start a number 1 in the World Music Charts Europe in July 2012. In November, Mariem Hassan was one of the headlining acts of the III edition of the "Festival du Sahel", a music festival taking place in the Lompoul desert.

In 2013 Mariem Hassan completed both a Sahrawi oral history project, Cuéntame Abuelo – Música, and a tour to promote the album El Aaiun Egdat. During this tour she performed European venues such as Malmo and Goteborg (at the Clandestino Festival) in Sweden, Sines in Portugal, in Marseilles at the Babel Med Festival, in Rome at the ninth Mojo Station Blues Festival, at the Desert Session in Salento (Southern Italy), in Belgium and in Spain.

==== In media ====
Hassan was the subject of a 2007 documentary film, Mariem Hassan, la voz del Sáhara.

In 2010, Link TV produced a short documentary on Hassan's music and activism, as part of the series "Rappers, Divas and Virtuosos: New Music from the Muslim World."

In October 2014, Calamar Edicion y Diseño published Hassan's official biography in the form of a graphic novel, Mariem Hassan – Soy Saharaui, written and illustrated by Italian authors Gianluca Diana, Andromalis, and Federica Marzioni.

In 2017 Manuel Domínguez and Zazie Schubert-Wurr published their adventures with Mariem Hassan in her concert tours for 18 years. "The Indomitable Voice" was published in English and Spanish by Nubenegra. A year later the German version was published by Frieling editorial. The book contains her last album "La Voz Indómita" and a DVD.

=== Death ===
Hassan died of bone cancer in the Sahrawi refugee camps of Tindouf province, Algeria on 22 August 2015.

== Noted lyrics ==
Among her works is the Spanish language song "Tus ojos lloran" ("Your eyes weep"), dealing with her personal experience of a woman coping with the sufferings of life and bereavement (the deaths of her father and two of her brothers).

== Discography ==
=== Studio albums ===
==== Collaboration albums ====
- 2002 Mariem Hassan con Leyoad
- 2015 Baila, Sáhara, baila, Nubenegra, (Mariem Hassan and Vadiya Mint el Hanevi)
- 2017 La voz indómita, Nubenegra.

==== Solo ====
- 2005 Deseos
- 2010 Shouka
- 2012 El Aaiun egdat

=== Featured in ===
- 1998 A pesar de las heridas
- 2001 El hechizo de Babilonia
- 2003 Nar
- 2004 Medej
- 2007 Hugo Westerdahl – Western Sahara
- 2010 The Rough Guide To Desert Blues

== See also ==
- Music of Western Sahara
- Najm Allal
- Aziza Brahim
- Spanish language § Africa
- Mariem Hassan, la voz del Sáhara
