= The Writer From a Country Without Bookstores =

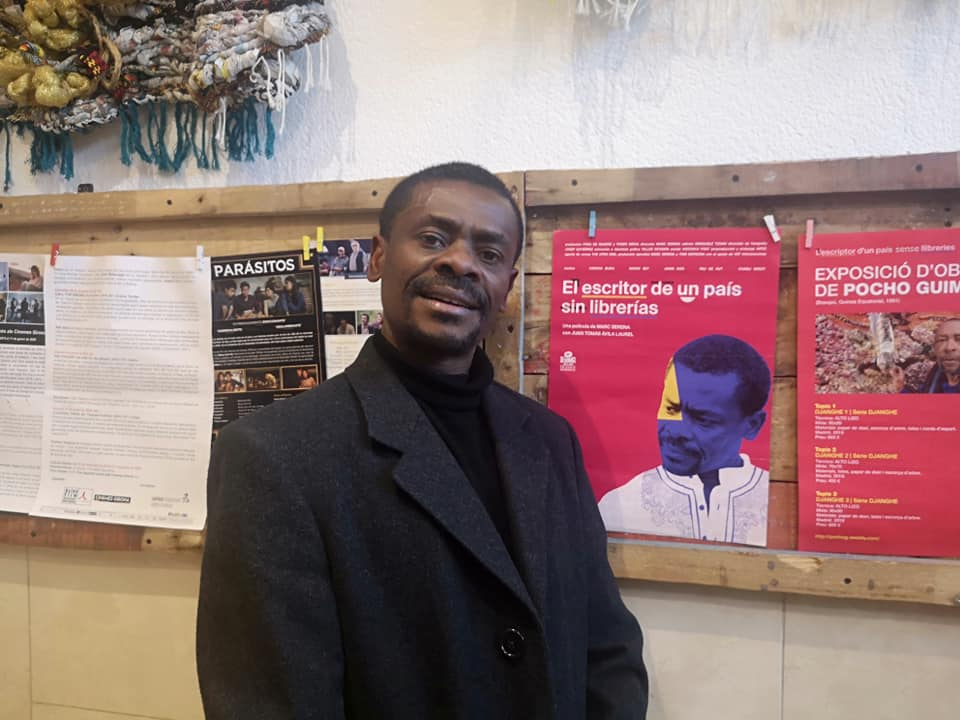
- Juan Tomás Ávila Laurel at the presentation of the documentary "The writer of a country without bookstores
- Directed by: Marc Serena
- Starring: Trifonia Melibea Obono, Juan Tomás Ávila Laurel, Negro Bey
- Release date: 2019
- Country: Equatorial Guinea
- Languages: Spanish, Creole

The Writer From a Country Without Bookstores is a documentary film that follows the life and work of Juan Tomás Ávila Laurel, the most translated writer from Equatorial Guinea, who had to flee his country in 2011 after protesting against the dictatorship of Teodoro Obiang. The film shows his journey as a refugee in Spain, where he struggles to find recognition and support for his literature, and his return to his homeland, where he faces the risks and challenges of being a dissident voice. The film is directed by Marc Serena, a Spanish filmmaker and journalist, who co-wrote the script with Ávila Laurel himself. The a film was released in 2019 and received several awards and nominations at international film festivals. The film is a powerful and inspiring portrait of a writer who uses his words as a weapon against oppression and injustice. His style of writing depicts world history with a connection to Equatorial Guinea and other countries.
