= Sahrauis: The Music of the Western Sahara =

1999 compilation album by various artists

Compilation album by Various artists
- Released: 14 September 1999
- Recorded: 1982; Barcelona, Spain; January 1998; Sahrawi refugee camps, Algeria & Madrid, Spain
- Genres: World, Folk
- Length: 2:46:00
- Label: Nubenegra
- Producers: Luis Delgado, Alberto Gambino, Zazie Wurr & Manuel Dominguez

Professional ratings
Review scores
Source	Rating
Down Beat	4.5/5 stars

Sahrauis: The Music of the Western Sahara is a three-disc box set of Saharawi music, published by the Spanish label Nubenegra. It was the first compilation of such songs released in the United States. The producers of the album travelled to the Sahrawi refugee camps and spent 14 days with the artists to record the CDs 1 & 2 of the compilation, with the aim of recording with the finest musicians and singers the traditional Sahrawi music (Haul) of the past and present.

CD 1, entitled "A Pesar De Las Heridas" ("Despite All Wounds") features Sahrawi women (including figures as Mariem Hassan or Aziza Brahim) singing Haul songs, while in CD 2, entitled "Sáhara Mi Tierra" ("Sahara My Land"), the lyrics are mostly interpreted by men, including guitarist Nayim Alal and Mahfoud Aliyen. CD 3, entitled "Polisario Vencerá" ("Polisario Will Win"), is a re-edition of a 1982 album by the Sahrawi band Chahid El Uali, which included singers as Mariem Hassan, Teita Leibid, Mahfoud Aliyen and Hadhoum Abeid.

== Track listing ==
The tracks on the 3 CDs are listed below:

Disc 1 – A Pesar De Las Heridas

1. "Dios Mío"
2. "A Pesar de las Heridas"
3. "Hijos de la Revolución"
4. "Nuestros Ojos"
5. "Se Alarga la Noche"
6. "Adán y Nuestra Madre Eva"
7. "Resistiendo"
8. "Nana"
9. "La Militante"
10. "La Sepultura"
11. "Danza de Smara"
12. "El Sahara Es Un Tesoro"
13. "La Noche del Exilio"
14. "Victoria al Señor de la Humanidad"
15. "Bani"
16. "La Tierra Derrama Lágrimas"
17. "El Jinete"
18. "Lo Que Anhelo"
19. "Canción de la Intifada"
20. "Llora Mi Corazón"
21. "Saludos y Adiós"

Disc 2 – Sáhara Mi Tierra

1. "Viva el Polisario"
2. "Madre No Llores por Mí"
3. "Plegaria"
4. "El Profeta"
5. "Qué Importan las Penas"
6. "Sahara Tierra Mía"
7. "Lumaya"
8. "Canta Conmingo"
9. "Bleida"
10. "Sin Secreto"
11. "Dios Mío"
12. "Palabras del Pasado"
13. "Nostalgia"
14. "Aucar"
15. "Viejos Recuerdos"

Disc 3 – Polisario Vencerá

1. "Jamás"
2. "RASD"
3. "Lucha de Masas"
4. "Aaiún"
5. "Creador de Glorias"
6. "20 de Mayo"
7. "Este Pueblo"
8. "Uargueziz"
9. "Luali"
10. "Ejército de Liberación"
