= Juan Tomás Ávila Laurel =

Equatoguinean author and activist

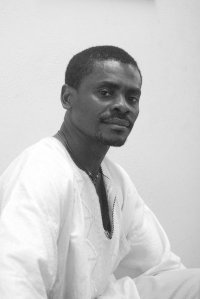
- Born: Juan Tomás Ávila Laurel; 6 November 1966 (age 59); Santa Isabel, Guinea, Spain (now Malabo, Equatorial Guinea)
- Occupations: Author, essayist, activist

Juan Tomás Ávila Laurel (born 6 November 1966) is an Equatoguinean author and activist. His parents were from the remote island of Annobón, off the West African coast. He is at the center of the feature award-winning documentary The Writer From a Country Without Bookstores.

For many years, Ávila Laurel was an author from Equatorial Guinea who lived in the country. He has engaged in protest and political activism regarding the government of Equatorial Guinea.

His first novel to be published in English, By Night the Mountain Burns (And Other Stories, 2014), was shortlisted for the 2015 Independent Foreign Fiction Prize, and is based on his time growing up on Annobón. The Gurugu Pledge, his second novel to appear in English, was published by And Other Stories in 2017.

Ávila Laurel made headlines in 2011 by embarking on an anti-government hunger strike, and now lives in exile in Barcelona.

== Novels translated into English ==
- (2014) By Night the Mountain Burns. And Other Stories, UK. ISBN 9781908276407
- (2017) The Gurugu Pledge. And Other Stories, UK. ISBN 9781908276940

== Other work ==
In 2003, he was appointed Joseph G. Astman Distinguished Faculty Lecturer at Hofstra University, New York. He has spoken at conferences in Korea, Switzerland, Spain and the United States. He is the author of more than a dozen books, including novels, plays, poetry, essays, and film scripts, and has several unpublished manuscripts, some of them forthcoming. Among his published titles are:

- 1994 – Poemas (Ediciones del Centro Cultural Hispano-Guineano, 1994)
- 1994 – Los hombres domésticos (Ediciones CCHG)
- 1998 – Rusia se va a Asamse (Ediciones CCHG)
- 1999 – La carga (Editorial Palmart, 1999)
- 1999 – Historia íntima de la humanidad (Ediciones Pángola, Malabo, 1999)
- 2000 – El derecho de pernada (Editorial Pángola, Malabo)
- 2000 – Áwala cu sangui (Editorial Pángola, Malabo)
- 2001 – El desmayo de Judas (Ediciones CCHG)
- 2002 – Nadie tiene buena fama en este país (Editorial Malamba, Avila, España)
- 2002 – Misceláneas guineoecuatorianas
- 2004 – El fracaso de las sombras
- 2005 – Cómo convertir este país en un paraíso: otras reflexiones sobre Guinea Ecuatorial
- 2006 – Guinea ecuatorial: vísceras (Institucio Alfons el Magnanim, 2006)
- 2007 – Cuentos crudos (Centro Cultural Español de Malabo, 2007)
- 2008 – Avión de ricos, ladrón de cerdos (El Cobre, 2008)
- 2009 – Arde el monte de noche (Calambur Editorial, 2009)
- 2019 – Cuando a Guinea se iba por (Ediciones Carena, Barcelona, 2019)

== See also ==
- Noted writers from Annobón Province
- Equatoguinean literature in Spanish
