= Raquel Ilombé =

Equatoguinean poet (1938–1992)

- Born: Raquel del Pozo Epita; 1931; Corisco, Spanish Guinea
- Died: 1992 (aged 60–61); Madrid, Spain
- Education: Madrid Royal Conservatory
- Occupations: Poet, author
- Writing career
- Pen name: Raquel Ilombé
- Language: Spanish

Raquel del Pozo Epita (1931–1992), known as Raquel Ilombé, was an Equatorial Guinean poet and author, who wrote in Spanish.

== Background and early life ==
She was born in Spanish Guinea (today Equatorial Guinea), on the island of Corisco, to an Equatorial Guinean mother and Spanish father. In her infancy, she moved to Burgos, Spain. She studied music and poem recital at the Madrid Royal Conservatory. She only returned to Equatorial Guinea later in life after she had married, and made several unhindered personal trips during the time of Francisco Macías Nguema. She died in Madrid in 1992.

== Poetry and writings ==
Ilombé is "recognized as the first female published author of Equatorial Guinean literature." Her pseudonym originates from one of the four main characters of the Ndowe storytelling. In this oral tradition, "Ilombe" represents the character of the dutiful(obedient) daughter.

Her first major published work was Ceiba, a collection of poems published in 1978. One of the primary topics is love. Ilombé wrote poems between 1970 and 1977 and they are arranged chronologically. References to both traditional African values and Catholic values can be seen within the work, such as in the poem "Quién Soy" (English: "Who am I"). While her references to nature reflect both Spain and Equatorial Guinea, her poems do not specifically touch on the nature of her being in diaspora. The collection is named after the Ceiba pentandra tree, the national tree of Equatorial Guinea which is found on its flag; the tree is also considered sacred.

In 1981 she published Leyendas Guineanas (English: Guinean Legends), a collection of eight legends from the Guinean ethnic groups of the Fang, Bubi, and Ndowe. It is considered the first children's book of Equatoguinean literature. In order to get the information found in the book, she toured remote villages in Equatorial Guinea in search of disappearing oral culture.

She has also published the poems "Nerea", "Ausencia", and "Amor", and written but not published the poem "Olvido".

== See also ==
- Equatoguinean literature in Spanish#1981–84
