= El Aaiun egdat =

Studio album by Mariem Hassan
- Released: 20 March 2012
- Recorded: January–March 2012, Axis studios, Madrid
- Genre: Blues, folk, world
- Length: 70:36
- Label: Nubenegra
- Producer: Manuel Domínguez

Mariem Hassan chronology
Shouka (2010)	El Aaiun egdat (2012)

Professional ratings
Review scores
Source	Rating
The Guardian	3/5 stars

El Aaiun egdat (Hassaniyya: العيون اگدات, romanized: ləʿyūn əgdāt, lit. 'El Aaiún burns') is the third album of Sahrawi singer Mariem Hassan. The album reached Number 1 on the World Music Charts Europe (WMCE) on June and July 2012. It was also elected as the best album presented at the 2012 edition of the World Village Festival in Helsinki, Finland.

== Track listing ==
No.	Title	Length
1.	"Arfa"	4:27
2.	"Arrabi Al Arabe"	4:26
3.	"Rahy El Aaiun Egdat"	5:53
4.	"Ana Saharauia"	5:23
5.	"Addumua"	4:08
6.	"Gdeim Izik"	5:27
7.	"Tarham Ya Allah Shuhada"	5:38
8.	"Eftaht Almayal"	4:59
9.	"Aulad Sahara"	4:15
10.	"Alamalhfa"	3:15
11.	"Legneiba"	4:34
12.	"Yalli Mashi Ani"	5:23
13.	"Annasr Shouru Tetnada"	5:27
14.	"Siyant Leyuad"	7:21
