= Mariem Hassan, la voz del Sáhara =

- Directed by: Manuel Domínguez
- Screenplay by: Manuel Domínguez
- Produced by: Canalmicro S. L., Manuel Domínguez
- Starring: Mariem Hassan
- Edited by: Sonia Marques, Manuel Domínguez
- Music by: Mariem Hassan
- Release date: 2007
- Running time: 55 minutes
- Country: Spain

Mariem Hassan, la voz del Sáhara ( in English, Mariem Hassan: the Voice of the Sahara) is a 2007 documentary film directed by Manuel Domínguez.

== Synopsis ==
Mariem Hassan was a Sahrawi singer and lyricist from Western Sahara whose worked helped modernize traditional Saharaui music. The documentary records the many ups and downs of Hassan's life. It reveals her as a "courageous and enduring character" who became a respected singer.

To make the documentary, director Manuel Dominguez accompanied Hassan on her travels with a camera, selected scenes from her concerts and recordings. His narrative captures the excitement of the "agarit" (cry of the desert). The documentary follows her at the ETNOSOI Festival in Helsinki in 2004, as well as in Les Escales, France, where the concert is transformed into a party with the Tuareg groups joining the performance. It also shows Hassan in a theater in Liège singing "Do not abandon me" two days before enduring an operation for cancer, as well as during recordings made in the desert at Saharawi camps.

== Director ==
Director Manuel Dominguez founded the Nubenegra record company in Madrid in 1994. Starting with Spanish and Cuban music, the company soon extended its range to new types of music from places such as Equatorial Guinea, Guinea-Bissau, Western Sahara, Brazil and the Sudan. In 1998 Nubenegra re-published Mariem Hassan's album "Polisario Vencerá", first released in 1982. Since then, Nubenegra has released several of her albums, starting with "Mariem Hassan con Leyoad" (2002). As well as directing the documentary Mariem Hassan, la voz del Sáhara, Manuel Dominguez supplied archival footage of Mariem's career and assisted in the production of the TV show Mariem Hassan: Voice of the Saharwis.
