= Mi Canto =

EP by Aziza Brahim
- Released: 12 January 2009
- Recorded: July–November 2007; Estudios Feedback, Sonido Vintage, León, Spain
- Genre: Blues, folk, world
- Length: 22:26
- Label: Reaktion
- Producer: Aziza Brahim

Aziza Brahim chronology
Mi Canto (2009)	O.S.T. Wilaya (2011)

Mi Canto is the debut solo digital ep of Sahrawi singer Aziza Brahim. It was released worldwide on 12 January 2009 by the French label Reaktion, reaching shortly after number one on the World music list of the web Emusic.com. Brahim, who produced the album herself, is accompanied by her band Gulili Mankoo in the recording.

In an interview during the recording of the album, Aziza Brahim remarked the fusion of the traditional Sahrawi music with other African musical traditions (wolof, bambara...) and instruments (djembe, darbuka...), and the use of modern musical structures instead of the Haul traditional ones. The song who gave name to the album, "Mi Canto", was composed years ago by Brahim and Nayim Alal. The lyrics are in Hassaniya, except the song "Hijo de las nubes", which is sung in Spanish.

== Track listing ==
No.	Title	Length
1.	"Himno"	03:44
2.	"Regreso"	05:00
3.	"Alli Nahuah"	03:39
4.	"Mi Canto"	05:18
5.	"Hijo De Las Nubes"	04:33
