= Soutak =

Studio album by Aziza Brahim
- Released: 7 February 2014
- Recorded: June 2013, Barcelona, Spain
- Genre: World, African, Arabic, Blues, Folk
- Length: 42:46
- Label: Glitterbeat Records
- Producer: Chris Eckman

Aziza Brahim chronology
Mabruk (2012)	Soutak (2014)	Abbar el Hamada (2016)

Professional ratings
Review scores
Source	Rating
The Irish Times	4/5 stars
London Evening Standard	4/5 stars
Financial Times	4/5 stars
Music OMH	4/5 stars
Spectrum Culture	4.25/5 stars

Soutak is a 2014 album by Sahrawi singer Aziza Brahim, and her first album for Glitterbeat Records.

The album was recorded at the studios El Tostadero, in Barcelona during June 2013. The producer of the album was Chris Eckman (Walkabouts, Ben Zabo, Tamikrest, Dirtmusic). The musicians on the album are Aziza Brahim (voice, tabal, rhythm guitar), Guillem Aguilar (bass), Kalilou Sangare (acoustic lead guitar), Nico Roca (percussion) and Badra Abdallahe (backing vocals).

== Reception ==
Soutak has topped the World Music Charts Europe (WMCE) for three months consecutively (March, April and May 2014), and stayed six months in the WMCE Top 20.

== Track listing ==
No.	Title	Length
1.	"Gdeim Izik"	6:09
2.	"Julud"	3:36
3.	"Espejismos"	4:37
4.	"Lagi"	5:53
5.	"Aradana"	2:59
6.	"Soutak"	3:44
7.	"La Palabra"	5:01
8.	"Manos Enemigas"	4:29
9.	"Ya Watani"	6:18
