= Starry Nights in Western Sahara =

Compilation album by Various artists
- Released: April 8, 2003
- Genre: Folk, World
- Label: Rounder Records
- Producer: Randy Barnwell & Randall Barnwell

Professional ratings
Review scores
Source	Rating
AllMusic	2.5/5 stars

Starry Nights in Western Sahara is an album compiled by filmmaker Danielle Smith, in the process of making one of her documentaries on Western Sahara. Starry Nights, published by North-American label Rounder Records, is the second compilation of Saharawi music released in the United States, after Sahrauis: The Music of the Western Sahara. The majority of the songs are sung by Umm Mekiya, a woman notorious for her voice. Songs range from traditional love songs to contemporary songs of political protest, accompanied with rhythmic clapping, lutes and tidinit.

== Track listing ==
No.	Title	Length
1.	"Ya Lali"	4:50
2.	"Ashweiba Gadia"	2:54
3.	"Ya Chaab Id Astighlalak"	5:48
4.	"Hayu Kamileen"	2:36
5.	"Ya Amal Al-Jamaheer"	6:07
6.	"Hal Yesmahu El-Alam"	2:55
7.	"The Celebration"	5:01
8.	"Instrumental tune played at weddings"	4:03
9.	"Bani"	3:32
10.	"Al-Hilm"	5:48
11.	"Assahara Ma Tinbaa"	3:07
