= Al Khadra Mabrook =

Sahrawi poet (1934–2021)

- الخضرة منت مبروك
- Born: 1938; Tiris, Spanish Sahara (now Western Sahara)
- Died: 2021 (aged 82–83); El Aaiún refugee camp, Tindouf, Algeria
- Occupation: Poet
- Writing career
- Pen name: Al Khadra
- Genre: Sahrawi oral poetry
- Subjects: Sahrawi resistance and struggle for independence

Al Khadra Mint Mabrook (Arabic: الخضرة منت مبروك; 1938 – October 2021), known as Al Khadra, was an internationally recognised Sahrawi poet.

== Biography ==
Al Khadra was born circa 1938 in Tiris. Her family were Bedouin and her childhood was spent moving through the region so her family could find grazing for their animals. She learnt poetry from a young age by listening to others perform.

The first poetry she learnt celebrated female beauty, but after the movement for self-determination from Spain started in the 1970s, her poetry changed to become socially conscious and celebrate the military achievements of the Polisario. Al Khadra is one of several poets, whose work has become a vital part of cultural resistance for the Sahrawi people. She is the only female Sahrawi poet to have documented the Western Sahara War from 1976 to 1991. Subjects of her poems include the Moroccan Western Sahara Wall, also known as the Berm; the Polisario's first tank; the refutation of "Moroccanisation" of her homeland; and providing fuel for "revolution".

In 1975, she was forced to move to the Tindouf refugee camps by the Moroccan army. In 2012 she was living in the El Aaiún refugee camp.

Al Khadra died in October 2021.

== Media ==
Al Khadra's granddaughter is the singer Aziza Brahim, who has performed poetry by her grandmother worldwide. The album Mabruk is dedicated to Al Khadra and records her work with backing by electric guitars and drums.

In 2012, Al Khadra was the subject of a documentary film entitled Al Khadra: Poet of the Desert, screened at the Africa in Motion Film Festival that year.
