= Saharan Spanish =

Spanish variety of Western Sahara

- Español saharaui
- Pronunciation: [espaˈɲol saxaˈɾawi]
- Language family: Indo-European: Italic; Latino-Faliscan; Romance; Western; Ibero-Romance; West Iberian; Castilian; Spanish; Saharan Spanish
- Early forms: Old Latin: Vulgar Latin; Proto-Romance; Old Spanish; Early Modern Spanish
- Writing system: Latin (Spanish alphabet)

Official status
- Official language in: Sahrawi Arab Democratic Republic

Language codes
- ISO 639-3: –
- IETF: es-EH

Saharan Spanish (Spanish: español saharaui) is the variety of the Spanish language spoken in Western Sahara and adjacent regions. This variety is heavily influenced by both Spanish cultural links and a strong expatriate community who live in Spain and particularly Mexico and Cuba.

== History ==
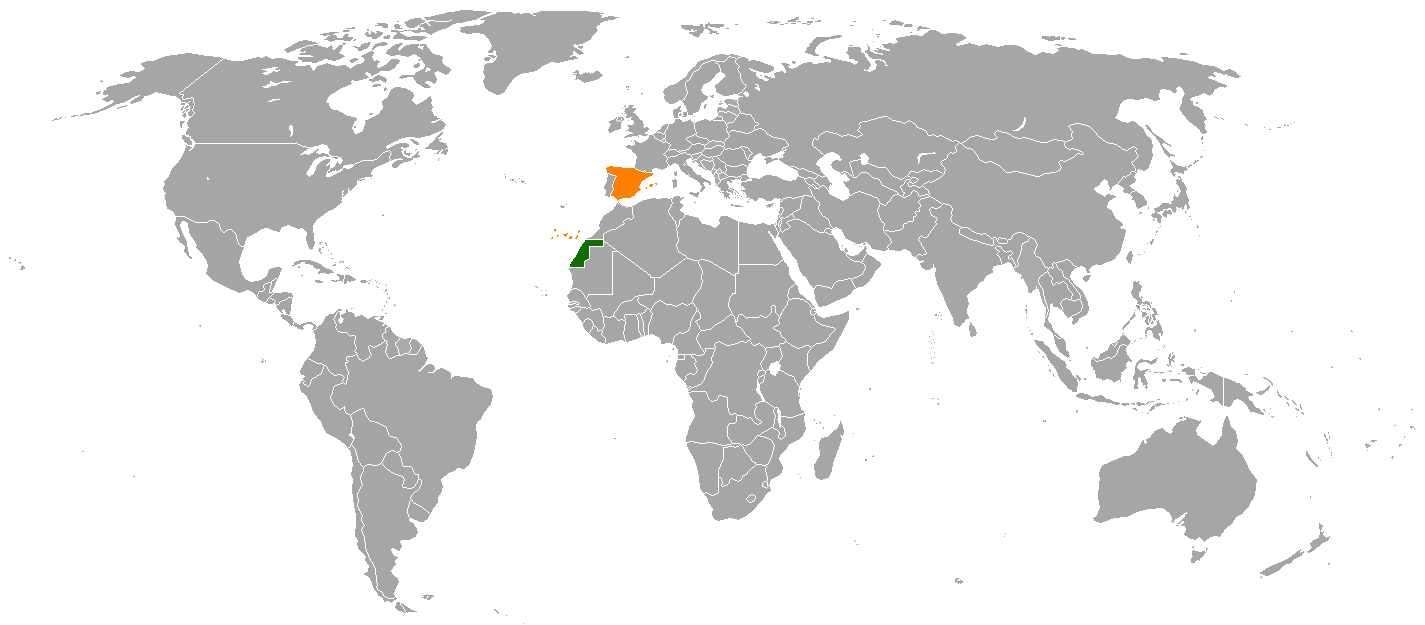

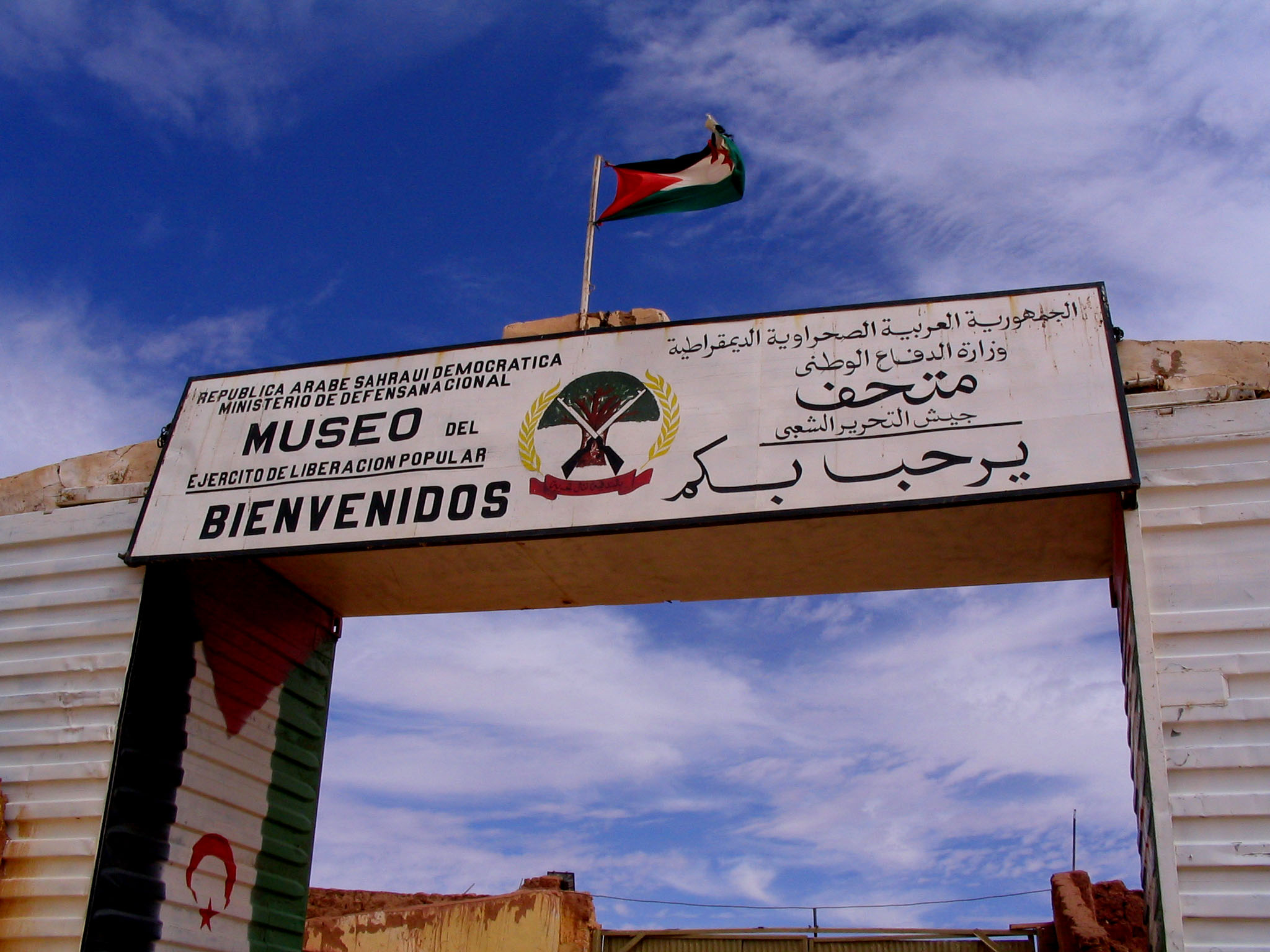
Western Sahara and former colonial power Spain (above) and frequent source of expatriate education Cuba (mid). A sign welcomes visitors to the People's Liberation Army Museum, a military museum in the Sahrawi refugee camps, in Arabic and Spanish.

The native and dominant language in Western Sahara is Hassaniya Arabic. Spanish was introduced by settlers in Spanish West Africa and Spanish Sahara in the 19th century. Older Sahrawis who went to school in the time of the Spanish colonization (up to 1975) are typically competent in the language, and in addition Spanish is taught to the new generations in the Sahrawi refugee camps near Tindouf, Algeria.

== Spanish during colonial rule ==
In 1957, just before the declaration of Western Sahara as a Spanish colony, there were 185 Spanish students and 53 Sahrawi students. In elementary schools, most of the teachers were Spanish with only thirty Sahrawi teachers. Between 1968 and 1969, the two secondary schools in El Aaiún and Villa Cisneros had a total enrollment of 3,655 students, with native Sahrawis making up half of the student body. According to the 1970 Spanish census, 21.8% of Western Sahara's population spoke Spanish. An important factor in the spread of the Spanish language was a bilingual radio program for Hassaniya speakers learning Spanish. It was launched by Radio ECCA, a Canarian radio station, which focuses on adult literacy and education.

== Postcolonial Spanish ==
In 1976, the Sahrawi Arab Democratic Republic established the Ministry of Education, Health, and Social Affairs. The initial team of Spanish educators consisted of two teachers, 35 university students, and several secondary school students. Between 1994 and 1999, the Ministry of Education implemented a reform in Spanish language instruction, focusing on teacher training, curriculum development, and the trial and expansion of a "Spanish Plan." This plan aimed to integrate crafts, technology, school activities, and physical education as practical areas for using Spanish in primary education. It was intended as a foundational step toward future bilingual secondary education, which has yet to be realized.

== Current usage and legal status ==
Spanish still influences Sahrawi society today and is the preferred second language for acquisition and government in the Sahrawi Arab Democratic Republic, though not in the Moroccan-ruled areas that make up most of the territory. In the Moroccan-ruled parts of the country, the foreign language taught in school is typically French, rather than Spanish. However, the role of Spanish remains apparent; for example, in Moroccan-controlled Laayoune, the Spanish Ministry of Education funds the international school Colegio Español La Paz. Arabic is the sole official language identified in the Sahrawi constitution, and the republic only uses Spanish for radio and TV broadcasts and state journalism. The Cervantes Institute estimates that there are 22,000 second-language speakers, 5% of the population, in Western Sahara, plus a larger number in the refugee camps in Algeria.

In zones controlled by the Sahrawi Arab Democratic Republic, Spanish is used in formal written and oral contexts among Sahrawi speakers themselves: Spanish, and not standard Arabic, covers everyday domains of use such as education, medicine and international relations, but is also used in the family sphere among speakers who have spent most of their lives in Spanish-speaking countries.

== Spanish in refugee camps ==
Bilingual education in refugee camps is obligatory and begins in the third year of primary school and extends to the beginning of secondary school. All written documentation from the ministry of public health, including administrative records, clinical files, reports, and medical prescriptions, is in Spanish. Additionally, Spanish is used in patient reception, consultations, medical procedures, and prescriptions. Health professionals and the Sahrawi population maintain constant interaction with medical staff from Spain and Cuba. Spanish use is promoted among the younger generations through scholarship opportunities abroad, namely in Cuba, offering access to primary and secondary education for Sahrawi refugees and asylum seekers. Another program, "Vacaciones en Paz," gives Sahrawi children aged 10-12 the opportunity to live with a family in Spain during the summer. In 2024, 2,930 Sahrawi children participated in the program.

Spanish vocabulary has entered Hassaniya, particularly in fields related to agriculture, automobiles, diet, and sanitation. These loanwords are reinforced due to Sahrawis studying abroad in Hispanic lands and returning to either Western Sahara or the Sahrawi refugee camps.

== Lexicon ==
Regarding the lexicon, the preference for Hispanisms in the framework of technique and tools has been documented, just as other countries have opted for solutions of the colonizing language such as English or French.

Hispanisms used by the Saharawi community
Lexical field	Originating loanword
Tools	enchufe destornillador tornillo martillo muelle
Automobiles/Transportation	coche caja de cambio tubo de escape chapa furgoneta motor volante
Sport	defensa extremo gol
Furniture	mueble cuna mesa cama
Health/Medicine	dispensario pomada venda jeringuilla receta
Education	biblioteca recreo lápiz
Food	pera manzana helado tortilla zumo queso
Clothing	chaqueta falda blusa

== Morphosyntax ==
In addition to lexical items, Sahrawi Spanish speakers have been noted to modify Spanish words according to typical Arabic morphological structures. This happens with plurals, which instead of taking the Spanish plural morpheme /-s/, adopts the Arabic morpheme for feminine plurals /-at/, as in /bañador-bañadurat/. The same morphological changes are made in the formation of diminutives. For example, /kama/ (cama; bed) makes the plural /kamat/ and the diminutive /akuaima/.

== Gallery of Spanish in Sahrawi society ==
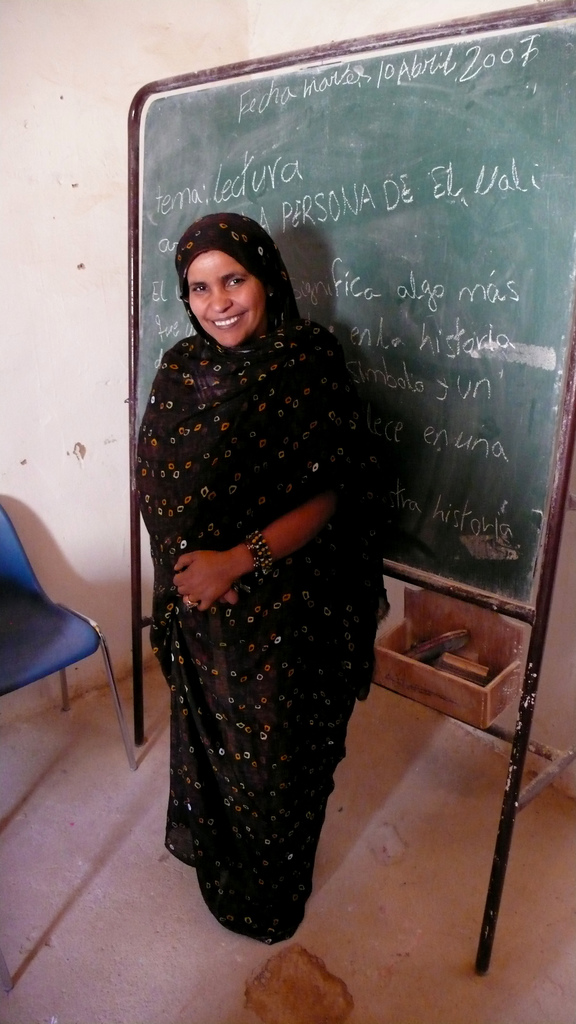
Sahrawi woman teaching Spanish in one of the Tindouf refugee camps.

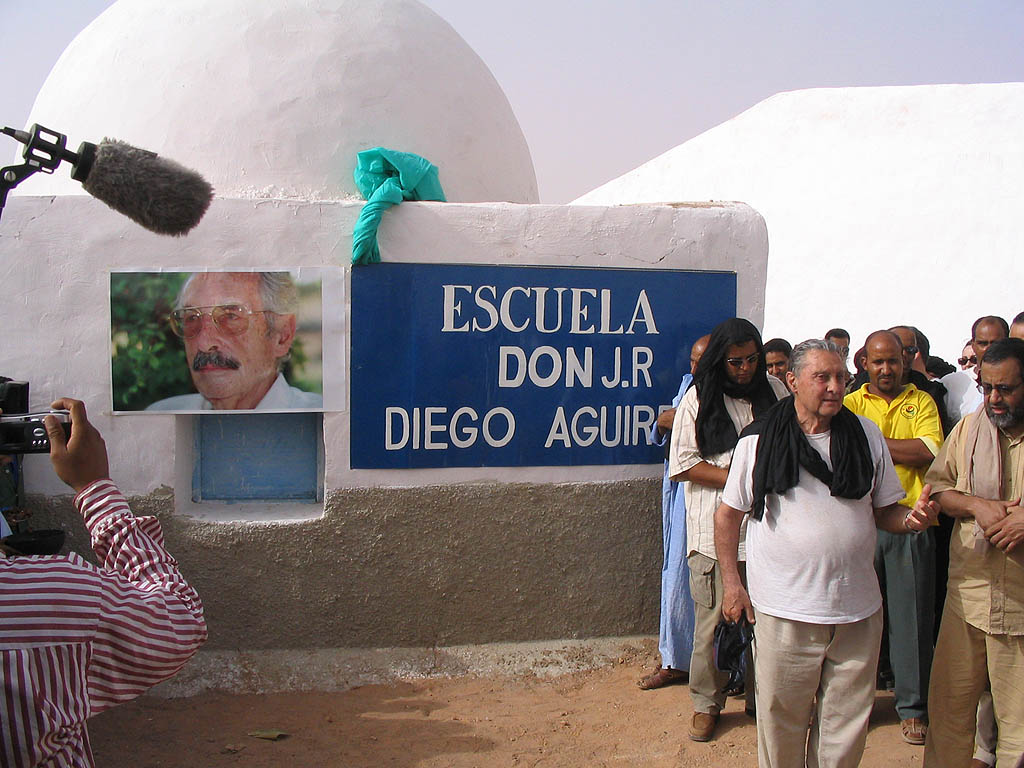
School in Bir Lehlu.

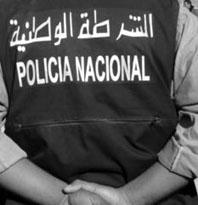
National Sahrawi Police.

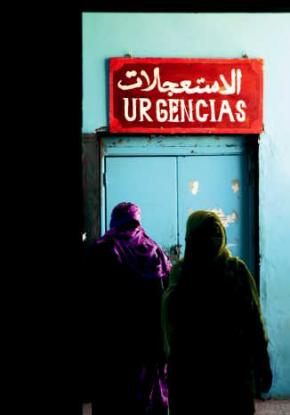
Emergency room.

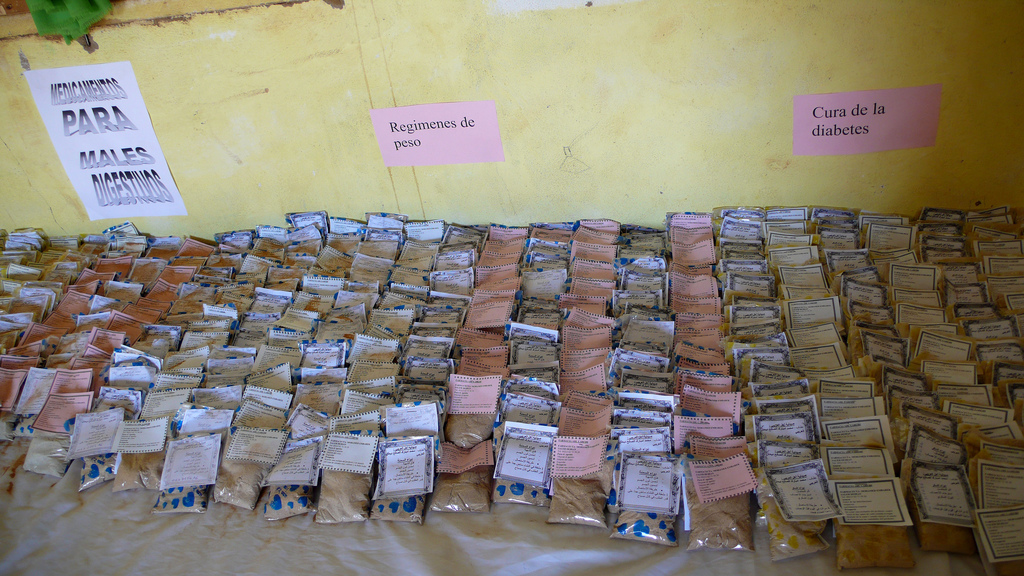
Sale of products in a Dajla pharmacy with posters in Spanish.

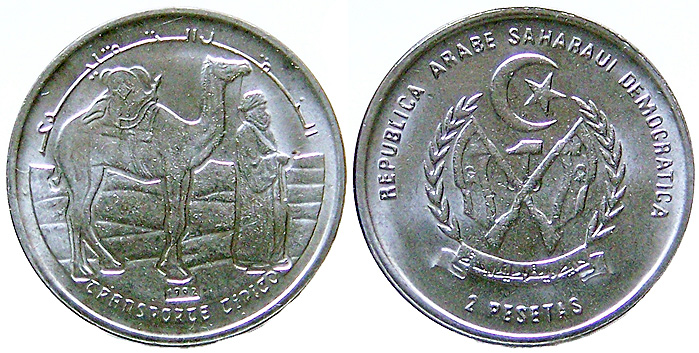
Coins of 2 Sahrawi pesetas with inscriptions in Spanish.

== See also ==
- Western Saharan literature in Spanish
- Equatoguinean Spanish
