= Shouka (album) =

Studio album by Mariem Hassan
- Released: 25 March 2010 (UK)
- Recorded: October 2009; Axis estudios, Madrid
- Genre: Blues, folk, world
- Length: 69:10
- Label: Nubenegra
- Producer: Manuel Domínguez

Mariem Hassan chronology
Deseos (2005)	Shouka (2010)	El Aaiun egdat (2012)

Professional ratings
Review scores
Source	Rating
AudioVideoHD.com	5/5 stars
RootsWorld.com	favorable link

Shouka (Hassaniyya: شوكة, romanized: šəwkə, lit. 'thorn') is the second album of Sahrawi singer Mariem Hassan. It was recorded again at Axis studios, in Madrid, and produced by Manuel Domínguez, who is also the boss of the label Nubenegra. The album reached Number 1 on the World Music Charts Europe (WMCE) in March 2010. "Shouka", the central song that titles the album, is a new experience in the Sahrawi music, as it is structured as a cantata. Taking the verses of Sahrawi poet Lamine Allal, Hassan developed a nine paragraph critical response to the 1976 speech of then Spanish opposition leader and later president of Spain Felipe González at the Sahrawi refugee camps (he compromised Spanish Socialist Workers' Party support to the Sahrawi people until "the final victory"), by using all scales and rhythms of the Haul. In this work, Mariem's group is completed with Lamgaifri Brahim (lead guitar) and Vadiya Mint El Hanevi (tbal, choruses and dances). Several other musicians contributed to the album, as Senegalese Malick Diaw (guitar), Spanish Kepa Osés (bass), Hugo Westerdahl (bass), Josemi Sánchez (guitar) and Jaime Muñoz (flutes), Iranian Behnam Samani (daf & tombak) and Davood Varzideh (ney), and Cuban-Haitian Mel Seme (percussionist).

== Track listing ==
No.	Title	Length
1.	"Azzagfa"	4:49
2.	"Terwah"	3:23
3.	"Tefla madlouma"	4:09
4.	"Baba Salama"	4:17
5.	"Ala Ahd Shaid"	3:32
6.	"Alu ummi"	4:15
7.	"Nabiyu rahma"	3:06
8.	"Maatal-la"	3:04
9.	"Laguman mbalgu"	4:18
10.	"Ragsat naàma"	3:55
11.	"Hinwani"	3:11
12.	"Abeina u manna"	3:43
13.	"Salem"	4:29
14.	"Fergan Leyuad"	4:21
15.	"Shouka"	12:08
16.	"Eid Arbain"	3:18
17.	"Haiyu"	3:22
