= Radio ECCA =

Coordinates: 28°7′9.96″N 15°26′14.6″W

Programming
- Language: Spanish
- Format: FM and internet
- Affiliations: Society of Jesus

Ownership
- Sister stations: Fourteen

Links
- Website: ECCA

Radio ECCA is a multifaceted educational radio station which began as a training center in adult literacy on the Spanish Gran Canary Island in 1967.

== History ==
A radio station dedicated exclusively to teaching was a revolutionary idea in 1965 when Francisco Villen of the Society of Jesus offered the first class on Radio ECCA. Villen gradually convinced public and private sources to give the necessary financial support to address the literacy needs of the people, which was not in itself a money-making venture. He based the ECCA educational system on the synchronization of radio classes with printed material for the students and counselling. In the first year the audience grew from 279 to 1,000 students.

The training provided by Radio ECCA began diversifying. In addition to conventional basic education, ECCA initiated training to facilitate access to the professional world for the people of the islands. Language and accounting were the first courses in ECCA's open classroom. This grew to more than two hundred programs covering fields as diverse as basic education, technologies, baccalaureate, languages, family intervention, free time, health and environmentalism.

Since the 1970s, ECCA Radio has collaborated with different Latin American institutions, giving rise to a wide network of initiatives that use the ECCA Radio Distance Learning system.

With more than 600 persons working in the network, ECCA continues to pursue its primary goal of reaching those with most need for an education, while also addressing the needs linked to new technologies and modern job training, democratic and participatory social values, culture of gender equality, those with disabilities.
