= Sandtracks =

Studio album by Tiris
- Released: 7 November 2007
- Recorded: Algiers, Algeria & Paris, France
- Genre: Blues, jazz, reggae, folk, world
- Length: 49:37
- Label: Sandblast - Believe Digital
- Producer: Kad Achouri & Mohamed Hafsi

Professional ratings
Review scores
Source	Rating
The Guardian	4/5 stars

Sandtracks is the 2007 debut album by the Sahrawi band Tiris, published by Sandblast Arts on November 7. A special digital edition was released on October 5 through Believe Digital. The album was re-released in 2011.

== Track listing ==
No.	Title	Length
1.	"Desert chant"	0:41
2.	"Ma Zein Wadna"	4:40
3.	"Tiris Nibreeha"	3:07
4.	"Istenfar" (featuring Manuel Delgado)	5:10
5.	"Ya Jayti"	2:03
6.	"El Nabi"	5:31
7.	"El Leil, el leil"	5:32
8.	"Assalam"	2:50
9.	"Aid Istiqlal"	2:51
10.	"Ghadara"	6:30
11.	"Ya Dayni"	5:11
12.	"Eh Heh Esski"	0:51

Digital edition bonus track

No.	Title	Length
13.	"El Nabi" (featuring Mufeed)	4:36
