= Donato Ndongo-Bidyogo =

Equatoguinean journalist and writer

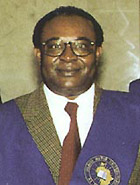
- Born: December 12, 1950 (age 75); Niefang
- Occupations: Writer; Journalist; Politician; Historian

Donato Francisco Ndongo-Bidyogo Makina (born 12 December 1950), known as Donato Ndongo, is an Equatoguinean journalist and writer who was one of the most prominent members of Hispanic African movement within the Spanish-speaking world.

== Early life ==
Ndongo was born in Niefang in 1950 (then in the Spanish Guinea, now in Equatorial Guinea). At the age of 14, he moved to Madrid, where he studied history and journalism. His first journalistic job was at the Spanish magazine Índice, where he reported on the Carnation Revolution. He later worked for media outlets such as Diario 16, Mundo Negro, and El País.

== Writings ==
Some of Ndongo's best-known books include Historia y tragedia de Guinea Ecuatorial (1977) and El Comercio Español con Africa (1980), in addition to numerous novels, historical, cultural and political articles written in Spain and for the foreign press. In 1984 he coordinated an anthology of Equatorial Guinean literature and was a finalist for the Sésamo Prize for his work entitled Las Tinieblas de tu Memoria Negra.

== Professional activities ==
Subsequently, Ndongo has served as the deputy director for "Nuestra Señora de África" in Madrid (1982–1985) and the Spanish Centre for Hispanic-Guinean Culture in Malabo (1985–1994), both dependent from the Spanish Ministry of Foreign Affairs.

== Later life ==
After returning to Spain in the 1990s, he settled into a house he owned in Los Alcázares (Region of Murcia) and later moved to a new home in the city of Murcia after winning a competition held by the University of Murcia to create a Centre for African Studies, where he had his children. After this contract ended in 2004, he worked temporarily as a visiting professor at the University of Missouri until he had to return to Spain in 2008. Without financial stability and without recognition of part of his Guinean work by Social Security, his situation worsened, and he had to re-mortgage his house in Los Alcázares, which he eventually lost, without settling his debts with the bank. As of July 2025, an eviction procedure for his second home is still open.

== Selected bibliography ==
=== Novels ===
- Las tinieblas de tu memoria negra (Editorial Fundamentos, 1987). Shadows of Your Black Memory, translated and with a postscript by Michael Ugarte (Swan Isle Press, 2007) ISBN 0-9748881-2-5
- Los poderes de la tempestad (Morandi, 1997)
- El metro ( El Cobre Ediciones, 2007)
- ¿Qué mató al joven Abdoulaye Cissé? (Ediciones Sequitur, 2023)
