= Aziza Brahim =

Aziza Brahim عزيزة منت ابراهيم
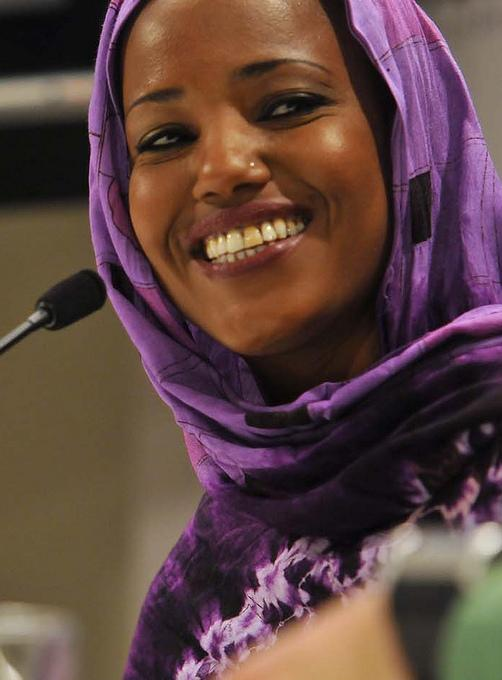
- Aziza Brahim during the presentation of the movie "Wilaya", at the 10th Human rights film festival in San Sebastián, Spain, April 26, 2012.

Background information
- Born: Aziza Brahim Maichan; June 9, 1976 (age 50); Sahrawi refugee camps, Tindouf, Algeria
- Genres: Folk music, roots music
- Occupations: Actress, musician, producer, songwriter
- Instruments: Vocalist, percussionist
- Years active: 1995–current
- Labels: Reaktion, Glitterbeat
- Website: azizabrahim.com

Aziza Brahim (Arabic: عزيزة منت ابراهيم, born June 9, 1976) is a Sahrawi singer and actress.

== Biography ==
=== Life ===
She was born in 1976 in the Sahrawi refugee camps, in the Tindouf region of Algeria where her mother had settled in late 1975, fleeing from the Moroccan occupation of Western Sahara. Her father remained in El Aaiun where he later died. Due to the Western Sahara War, Aziza never met him.

Growing up in the severe conditions of the desert camps, Aziza discovered music as both a source of entertainment and a natural way to express and communicate her personal emotions and thoughts of resistance.

At the age of 11, she received a scholarship to study in Cuba, like many Sahrawi students at the time. She wanted to study music, but was rejected. She left school and returned to the refugee camps in 1995, pursuing her musical career. Since 2000 she has lived in Spain, first in León and later in Barcelona. She is married and she has a daughter.

Her grandmother is the renowned Sahrawi poet Al Khadra Mabrook.

=== Career ===
In 1995, she won the "1st National Song Contest", in the National Culture Festival of the Sahrawi Arab Democratic Republic. She then joined the "National Sahrawi Music Group", touring Mauritania and Algeria. In 1998 she contributed with two songs to the collective album "A pesar de las heridas". That year she toured Europe with and the Sahrawi group Leyoad, visiting Spain, France and Germany. In 1999 she returned to the refugee camps, recording a session for the Sahrawi National Radio with Tuareg musicians from Tamanrasset, Algeria. Between 2001 and 2003, she toured again in Spain, France and Germany with Leyoad. In 2005, she collaborated with the Spanish Latin jazz band Yayabo. In 2007 she created the group Gulili Mankoo, composed of musicians from Western Sahara, Spain, Colombia or Senegal, mixing traditional African music with blues and rock, recording with them in 2008 her first solo work, the EP "Mi Canto". In 2009 she collaborated on a song of the collective rap EP "Interrapcion – Crisol 09", and one song from her EP was featured in the compilation album "Listen to the Banned". Since 2009, Aziza Brahim has been regularly touring Spain and France with the Basque txalaparta group Oreka Tx, in the "Nömadak Tx Zuzenean" tour.

In 2011, she became involved in the Spanish film Wilaya, composing, producing and interpreting the original soundtrack, as well as acting for the first time in a film.

In February 2012, Reaktion released Brahim's first LP, entitled "Mabruk" in honor of her grandmother, for June. In April, Efe Eme magazine reported that Brahim would take part in the 2012 edition of the WOMAD Cáceres festival.

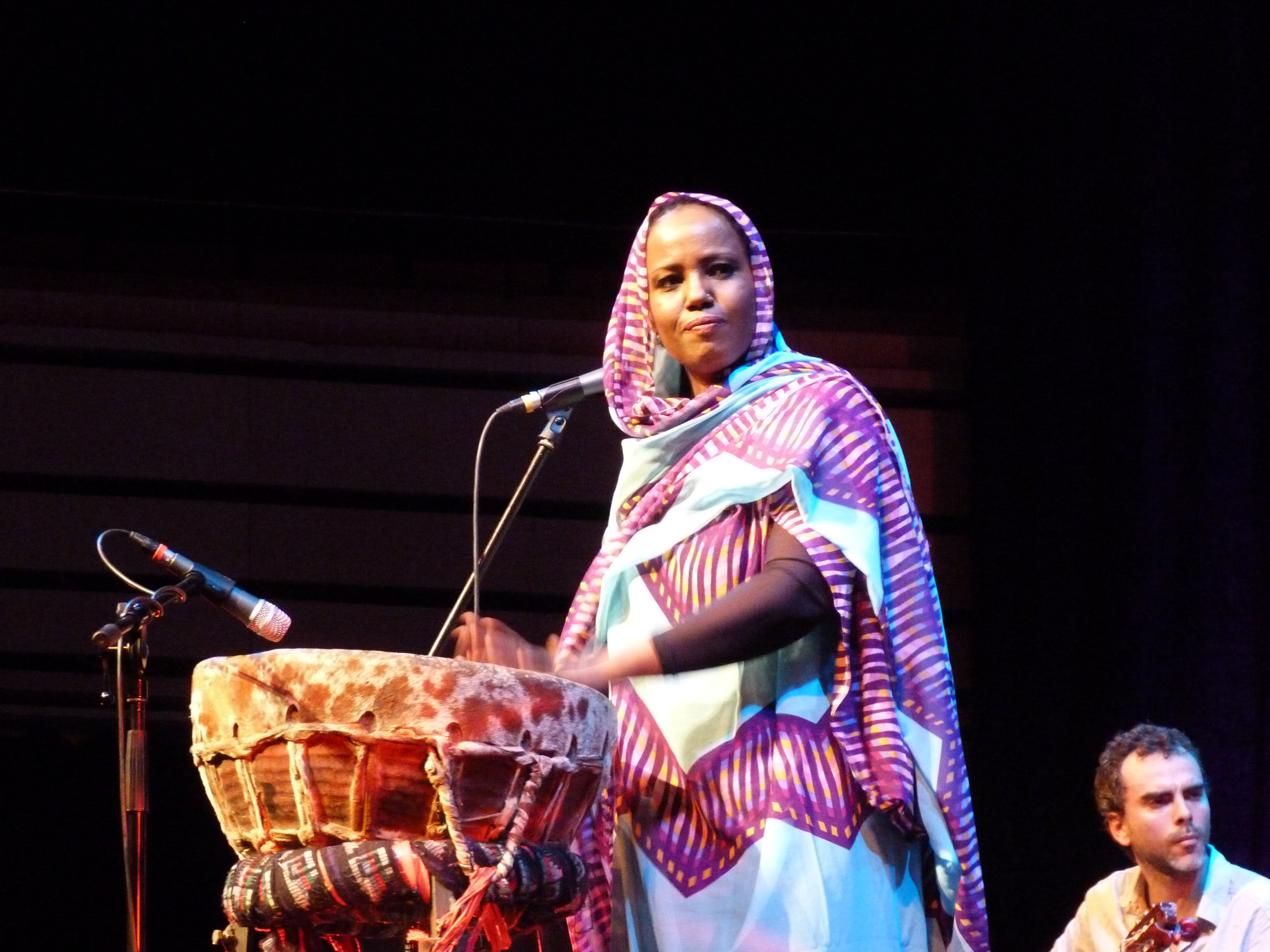
Aziza Brahim performing at WOMEX 15, Budapest

In 2014 Aziza Brahim released her third album Soutak (Glitterbeat, 2014), an acoustic record featuring musicians from both the Barcelona and Malian music scenes and incorporating Malian, Spanish, Cuban and contemporary Anglo-European influences in addition to Brahim's traditional Sahrawi sound. Soutak topped the World Music Charts Europe (WMCE) three times (March, April and May 2014).

== Discography ==
=== Studio albums ===
- 2008 Mi Canto EP
- 2011 OST Wilaya
- 2012 Mabruk
- 2014 Soutak
- 2016 Abbar el Hamada
- 2019 Sahari
- 2024 Mawja

=== Featured in ===
- 1998 A pesar de las heridas – Cantos de las Mujeres Saharauis
- 2003 Nar
- 2009 Interrapcion – Crisol 09
- 2010 Listen to the Banned

== Books ==
- 2025 Cantos en silencio

== Awards and nominations ==
In 2009, she was a finalist for the Freedom to Create Prize, which celebrates the power of art to fight oppression, break down stereotypes and build trust in societies. In late April 2012, she won the Málaga Spanish Film Festival Best Original Soundtrack Silver Biznaga, for her music of the movie Wilaya.

== Noted lyrics ==
Some of the lyrics of her songs are poems that she had heard from her grandmother El-Jadra Mint Mabruk, known as "the poet of the rifle" in the Sahrawi refugee camps

== See also ==
- Music of Western Sahara
- Nayim Alal
