= Mariem Hassan con Leyoad =

Studio album by Mariem Hassan and Leyoad
- Released: 1 January 2002 (Spain)
- Recorded: 1999–2001; Axis estudios, Madrid
- Genre: Folk, world
- Length: 50:40
- Label: Nubenegra
- Producer: Alberto Gambino & Manuel Domínguez

Mariem Hassan chronology
Mariem Hassan con Leyoad (2002)	Deseos (2005)

Professional ratings
Review scores
Source	Rating
Robert Christgau	A−

Mariem Hassan con Leyoad is a 2002 collective album by Mariem Hassan and the Sahrawi group Leyoad.

== Track listing ==
#	Title	Performer	Length
1.	"Id chad"	Mariem Hassan	3:32
2.	"Wadna"	Shueta	5:00
3.	"Enbia Allah"	Jalihena Natu	2:44
4.	"Wajadu"	Mariem Hassan and Jalihena Natu	4:49
5.	"Yasar geidu"	Mariem Hassan	3:22
6.	"Bismi Allah"	Bouba Han and Jalihena Natu	2:48
7.	"El Wejda"	Hababa and Nayim Alal	3:38
8.	"Arareida"	Mariem Hassan and Sahrawi women	3:24
9.	"Ya Arabia"	Mariem Hassan and Jalihena Natu	4:59
10.	"Nabi ana"	Mariem Hassan	5:01
11.	"El leil wana o mulana"	Jalihena Natu	5:34
12.	"Sahara neb gija"	Mariem Hassan	5:49
