= Bahia Mahmud Awah =

Sahrawi writer

Bahia Mahmud Awah محمود باهيا العوا
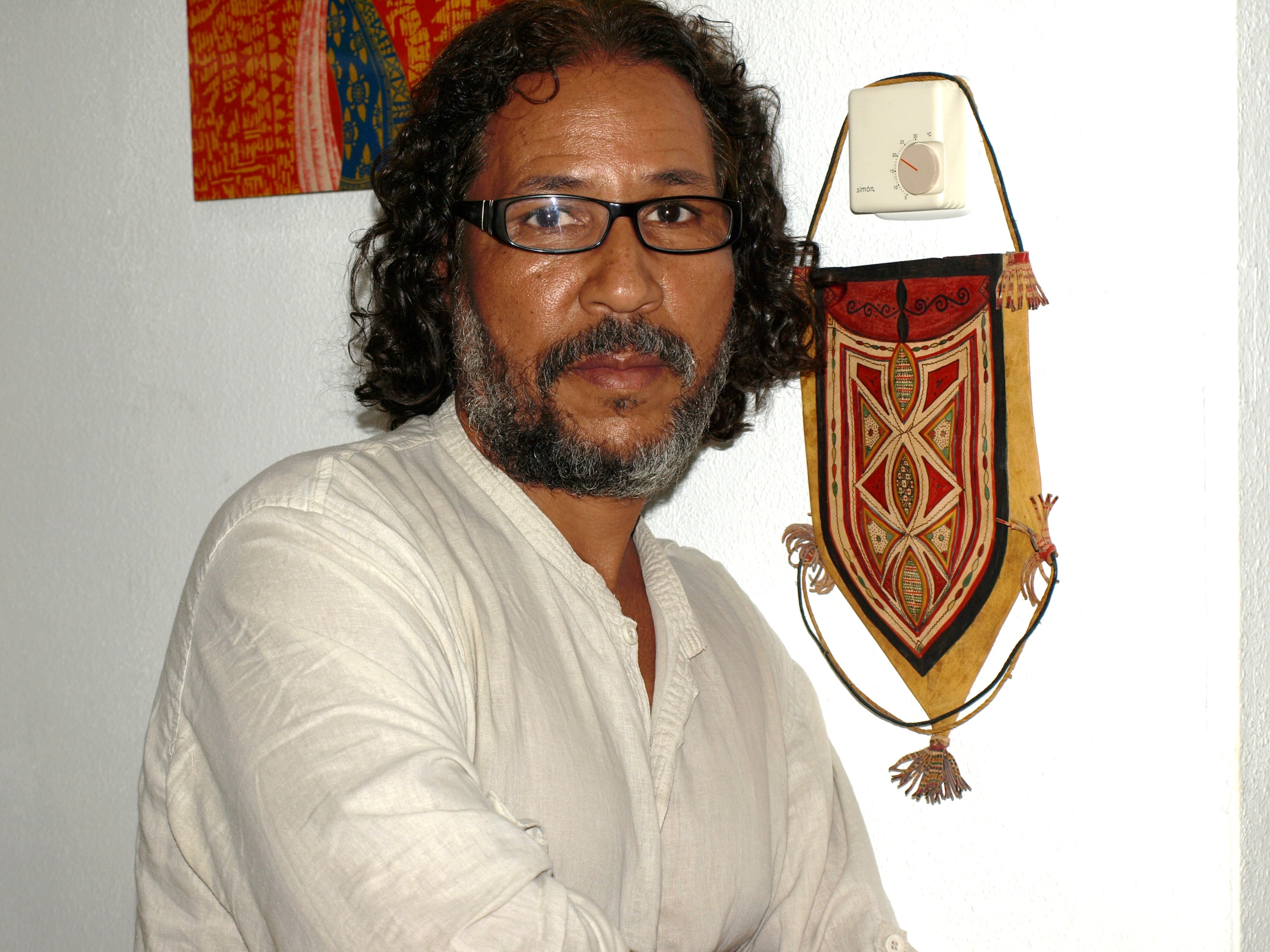
- Born: 1960 (age 65–66); Gleibat Ihiyak, Auserd, Spanish Sahara
- Education: University of Havana, Cuba
- Occupations: Writer, journalist
- Writing career
- Language: Spanish
- Notable works: Versos Refugiados (2007); Literatura del Sáhara Occidental (2008); El Porvenir del Español en el Sáhara Occidental (2009); La Maestra que me enseñó en una Tabla de Madera (2010); El Sueño de Volver (2012)
- Website: www.bahiaawah.net

Bahia Mahmud Awah (born 1960) is a Sahrawi writer, poet and journalist. He is a founding member of the group of writers known as the "Sahrawi Friendship Generation".

== Personal life ==
Bahia was born into a nomadic family in 1960 near Auserd, located in the Rio de Oro southern region of, what was then, the Spanish Sahara. He was named Bahia in honour of his uncle, the Sahrawi poet Bahia Uld Awah. His mother gave him his first classes, acting as teacher until he joined the first schools made by the Spanish authorities, an experience he later portrayed in his book "La maestra que me enseñó en una tabla de madera" (The Teacher Taught Me on a Wooden Board). Bahia spent those early years between the schoolyard and the desert, shepherding the flocks belonging to his family. He obtained his bachelor's degree by studying both in Western Sahara and Algeria, because of the start of the Western Sahara War.

In the late seventies he moved to Cuba to undertake his university studies, like many Sahrawi youths at the time. Although he had always loved the arts, he graduated in telecommunications from the University of Havana. On returning to the Sahrawi refugee camps, he directed the Spanish program at the Sahrawi National Radio for four years.

In 1998 he moved to Spain, where he did linguistics and translation studies at the Autonomous University of Madrid and the University of Alcalá. In 2001 he started the blog "Poemario por un Sáhara Libre" (Poems by a Free Sahara) as a space for social, political and cultural news about the Sahrawi people. Since 2010, he has been an honorary professor of Social Anthropology at the Faculty of Philosophy and Literature at the Autonomous University of Madrid. He has held conferences about the Sahrawi literature in the universities of Spain and USA.

== Career ==
Bahia started writing when he was 25, according to his "Little Reflections and Poems". In 2005, with other Sahrawi writers and poets, he formed the group known as the "Sahrawi Friendship Generation". In 2007, the Alcalá de Henares University published his first individual book of poems, entitled "Versos refugiados" (Refugee Verses). In 2008, he published what he stated was a "brief essay" named "Literatura del Sáhara Occidental" (Western Saharan Literature), where he took a look at the Sahrawi oral and written literature since the 18th century to now, both in Hassaniya and Spanish. In 2010 the editorial Sepha published his first novel, entitled "La maestra que me enseñó en una tabla de madera" (The Teacher Taught Me on a Wooden Board), a book mostly based on his childhood memories about his mother, who taught him to read and write. In 2012, the Arabic culture specialized editorial CantArabia published "El Sueño de Volver" (The Dream of Returning), in which Awah remembers his life and experiences in the then Spanish Sahara.
