= Deseos (Mariem Hassan album) =

Studio album by Mariem Hassan
- Released: 20 September 2005 (Spain); 8 February 2006 (UK)
- Recorded: 2005; Axis estudios, Madrid
- Genre: Blues, folk, world
- Length: 63:45
- Label: Nubenegra
- Producer: Baba Salama Said & Manuel Domínguez

Mariem Hassan chronology
Mariem Hassan con Leyoad (2002)	Deseos (2005)	Shouka (2010)

Professional ratings
Review scores
Source	Rating
Songlines (magazine)	4/5 stars
Robert Christgau	B+

Deseos (English: Wishes) is the 2005 debut solo album of the Sahrawi singer Mariem Hassan. The album was recorded at Axis estudios in Madrid, and produced by guitarist Baba Salama, who died of leukemia one week before the release of the album. With the use of two electric guitars (played by Baba Salama and Boika Hassan, Mariem's brother) and two tbals (played by Fatta Sadaf and Leila), the album had been hailed as a fresh actualization of the traditional Sahrawi Haul traditional music. The song "La Tumchu anni" is one of the highlights, a picturesque desert blues. It also contains one of Mariem's most known songs, "La Intifada", about the 2005 Sahrawi Independence Intifada. "El Chouhada" is dedicated to her three dead brothers, who were killed fighting during the Western Sahara War, while in "Mutamaniyat" she asks God for the healing of her breast cancer.

== Track listing ==
No.	Title	Length
1.	"Mawal"	3:12
2.	"Magat milktna dulaa"	4:49
3.	"La Tumchu anni"	6:40
4.	"Mutamaniyat"	4:31
5.	"El Chouhada"	4:45
6.	"Shauda"	6:36
7.	"La Intifada"	6:36
8.	"Sbar"	4:14
9.	"El Arabi"	2:43
10.	"Kalat Leili"	6:36
11.	"Tirka"	2:56
12.	"El Magil"	4:20
13.	"Jelefne bi salam"	3:59
14.	"Mawal"	1:48
