= El Wali (band) =

Sahrawi folk music group

El Wali is a Western Saharan folk music group who recorded an album, Tiris, in 1994. Their lyrics are "politically charged" and call for independence for the Sahrawi people; the album was described as "a call to arms—with national anthems, celebrations of political anniversaries, and religious pleas for peace". According to Sahel Sounds, the American label that reissued the album, it was recorded in Belgium and released in a limited run for the Belgian OXFAM. The band's music first appeared anonymously as "Polisario" on a 2012 compilation from the Sahel Sounds label, Music from Saharan Cellphones, before Tiris was released in 2019.

Ammar Kalia, writing for The Guardian, characterized the music as "80s synth-funk textures and propulsive, danceable rhythms". A reviewer for Spex called Tiris a "soundtrack for the socialist movement in the Western Sahara".

== Discography ==
- Tiris (1994)
