= Remei Sipi =

Equatoguinean writer (born 1952)

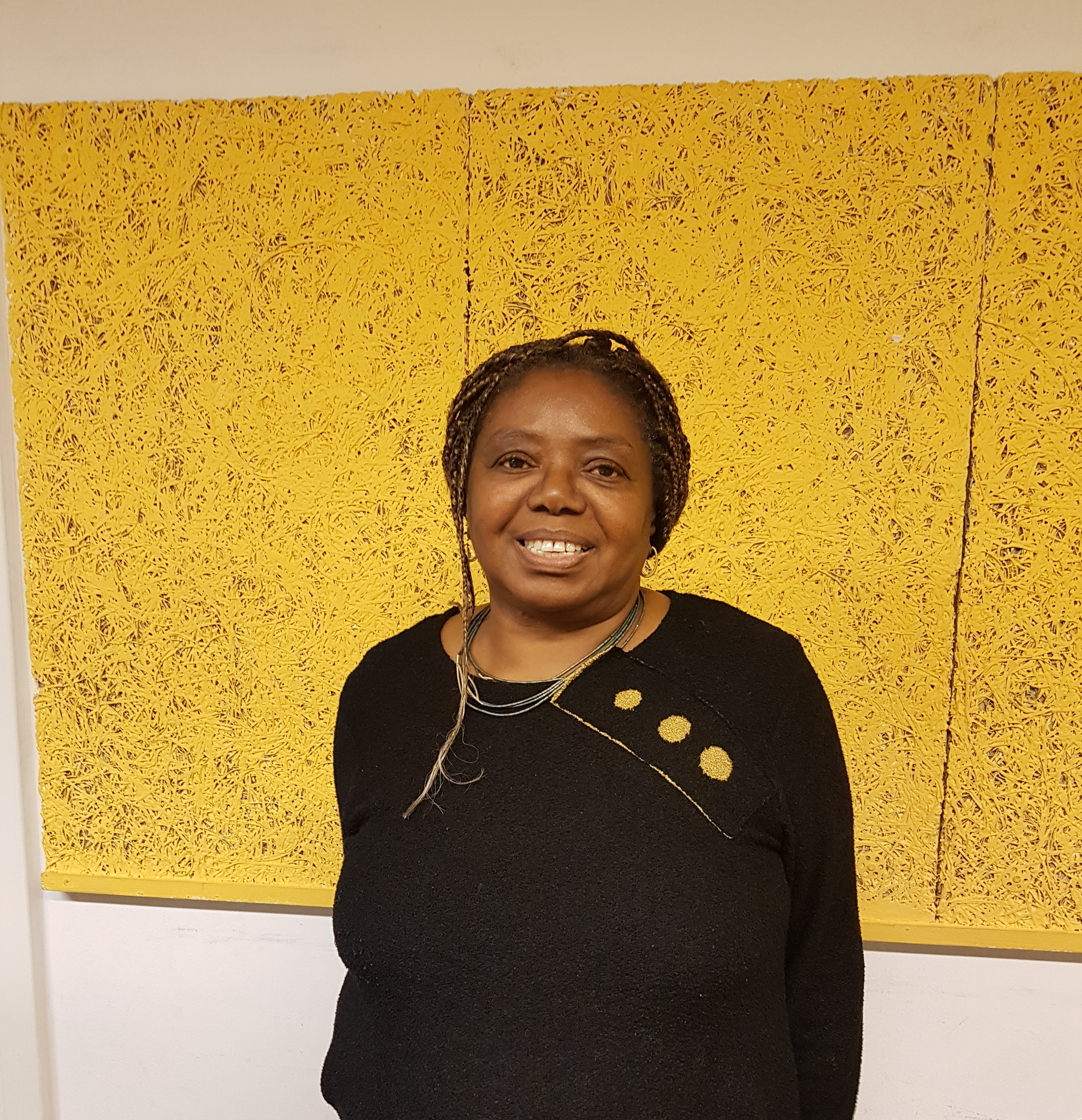
- Sipi in 2019
- Born: Remei Sipi Mayo; 1952 (age 73–74); Rebola, Spanish Guinea
- Other name: Tía Remei
- Education: Autonomous University of Barcelona
- Occupations: Writer, researcher, activist

Remei Sipi Mayo (born 1952), also known as Tía Remei, is an Equatorial Guinean writer, editor, educator, and activist focused on gender and development.

Based in Spain, she is noted for her activism in the Afro-descendent women's movement, and she previously served as president of the Federación de Asociaciones Guineanas de Cataluña (Federation of Guinean Associations of Catalonia).

== Biography ==
Remei Sipi was born in 1952 in Rebola, a town on the island of Bioko in Equatorial Guinea. In 1968, when she was 16 years old, she moved to live in Barcelona. She graduated with a degree in childhood education and a specialization in gender and development from the Autonomous University of Barcelona.

As an activist, she has worked to defend women, ethnic minorities, and immigrants. She has promoted the African women's movement, working to avoid folklorization—in which foreigners are defined by their cultural otherness—at intercultural events.

In the early 1980s, she became president of Riebapua, a collective of members of the Bubi people from Equatorial Guinea in Catalonia. In 1990, she co-founded the organization E’Waiso Ipola, which means "woman, lift yourself up/get woke." Three years later, she became one of the co-founders of the Spanish association of African intellectuals MFUNDI-KUPA. She also co-founded and led Yamanjá, a network of immigrant women in Catalonia, in 2005.

Sipi also served as president of the Federación de Asociaciones Guineanas de Cataluña (Federation of Guinean Associations of Catalonia), vice president of the Consell Nacional de Dones de Catalunya, spokesperson for the women's secretariat of the immigrant collective federation in Catalonia, and member of the Consell de la Llengua Catalana. She was also a member of the Network of Black and Ethnic Minority Women in Europe, the Support Platform for political prisoners in Equatorial Guinea, and various other women's organizations.

In addition to oral literature and essays, Sipi has written several books on gender and African migrant women. She is the founder of Editorial Mey, a publisher focused on Equatoguinean literature. In 2020, her work was included in the anthology Teléfono de emergencia literaria: escritoras ecuatoguineanas published by the Spanish Cultural Centers in Bata and Malabo.

== Selected works ==
- 1997 – Las mujeres africanas: Incansables creadoras de estrategias
- 2004 – Inmigración y género. El caso de Guinea Ecuatorial
- 2005 – Les dones migrades [Texto impreso]: apunts, històries, reflexions, aportacions
- 2005 – Cuentos africanos
- 2007 – El secreto del bosque: un cuento africano
- 2015 – Baiso, ellas y sus relatos, with Nina Camo and Melibea Obono
- 2015 – Voces femeninas de Guinea Ecuatorial. Una antología
- 2018 – Mujeres africanas: Más allá del tópico de la jovialidad
