= Juan Balboa Boneke =

Equatoguinean politician and writer (1938–2014)

- Born: 9 June 1938; Rebola, Spanish Guinea
- Died: 10 March 2014 (aged 75)
- Citizenship: Equatorial Guinean
- Occupations: Politician, Writer

Juan Balboa Boneke (9 June 1938 – 10 March 2014) was an Equatorial Guinean politician and writer.

He was born in Rebola, Spanish Guinea and studied at the Escuela Superior de Santa Isabel and at La Escuela social de Granada. His paternal side, the Balboa, was of Cuban descent. He was minister under Teodoro Obiang until he dissented with the dictatorship's policies and went into exile in Valencia, Spain. Prior to his position in the Guinean government, he would live for over 15 years in Mallorca (where his daughter María Concepción, a flamenco singer best known as Concha Buika, was born). After his exile, he settled down in Valencia with his second wife and her family.

Balboa Boneke died from renal problems, coupled with a three-year depression caused by the death of his wife, on 10 March 2014 in Valencia, Spain.

== Books ==
- ¿A dónde vas Guinea?", Palma de Mallorca, 1978.
- O Boriba (el exiliado), 1982.
- Desde mi vidriera, 1983.
- El Reencuentro: El retorno del exiliado, Ediciones Guinea, D.L. 1985 (Fuenlabrada : Anzos).
- Sueños en mi selva: (antología poética), Centro Cultural Hispano-Guineano, D.L 1987.
- La transición de Guinea Ecuatorial : historia de un fracaso. Madrid : Labrys 54, 1996.
