= Listen to the Banned =

Compilation album by Various Artists
- Released: Europe March, 2010; UK August, 2010; United States 26 October 2010.
- Genre: World
- Labels: Grappa Music, Valley Entertainment
- Producers: Deeyah Khan, Ole Reitov

Listen to the Banned is a compilation album that features the music of banned, censored and imprisoned artists from the Middle East, Africa and Asia. The album is the result of a two-year collaboration between the Norwegian artist Deeyah Khan and international organisation Freemuse. As well as receiving critical acclaim, Listen to the Banned album has peaked at number 6 on the World Music Charts Europe and spent months on these charts. The album was released worldwide in 2010

Together with Freemuse, Deeyah's' aim with Listen to the Banned is to help give a voice to the voiceless and to promote freedom of creative and musical expression and to promote the work of Freemuse. The album is supported by Amnesty International UK.

Freemuse & Deeyah present Listen to the Banned is the first album release in what is planned to be a long term series of Listen to the Banned compilation albums.

== Track listing ==
No.	Title	Performer(s)	Length
1.	"Mystery"	Mahsa Vahdat	4:59
2.	"Arooss-e-Aftaw"	Farhad Darya	3:44
3.	"Constitution Constipée"	Lapiro de Mbanga	7:31
4.	"Oh My Father, I Am Yusif"	Marcel Khalife	6:54
5.	"Rebel Woman"	Chiwoniso Maraire	4:31
6.	"Quitte Le Pouvoir"	Tiken Jah Fakoly	4:20
7.	"Salam Darfur"	Abazar Hamid	3:57
8.	"Al Shatte' Al Akhar"	Kamilya Jubran	4:45
9.	"Atlan Dok"	Kurash Sultan	5:32
10.	"Alisero"	Ferhat Tunc	5:33
11.	"Regreso"	Aziza Brahim	5:11
12.	"Speena Kontara"	Haroon Bacha	6:41
13.	"Non Au Racisme"	Fadal Dey	3:10
14.	"Bhallelak"	Amal Murkus	2:39
