= Leoncio Evita Enoy =

Equatoguinean intellectual (1929–1996)

Leoncio Evita
- Born: Leoncio Evita Enoy; 8 August 1929; Udubuandolo, Bata, Spanish Guinea
- Died: December 1996 (aged 67); Bata, Equatorial Guinea
- Occupations: Intellectual, painter, writer

Leoncio Evita Enoy (8 August 1929 – December 1996) was an Equatorial Guinean intellectual, painter and writer.

== Life ==
Evita attended several schools in San Carlos and learned drawing by correspondence. He worked as a teacher in Bata's Escuela de Artes y Oficios (School of Arts and Offices) and was a regular contributor to the Poto-Poto literary magazine. He lived in Cameroon from 1953 to 1960.

== Works ==
- Cuando los combes luchaban, 1953, considered the first novel from Equatorial Guinea.
- Alonguegue (No me salvaré)
- El guiso de Biyé.

=== Anthologies ===
- Donato Ndongo-Bidyogo; Mbaré Ngom (eds.) Literatura de Guinea Ecuatorial : antología, Madrid, España : SIAL Ediciones, ISBN 978-84-95498-17-5
