= Tiris (band) =

- Origin: Western Sahara, Sahrawi refugee camps
- Genres: Haul, Desert Blues, World music, Worldbeat
- Years active: 2005–present
- Label: Sandblast Arts

Tiris is a band formed by Sahrawi refugees at the Sahrawi refugee camps in Tindouf, Algeria. Their lyrics are about love, loss, and their long struggle and aspirations for independence in their homeland of Western Sahara. Their name honours of a southern zone of their country, known traditionally for being a land of holy men, poets and musicians.

The 9-member group made their first international major performance at the Festival au Désert, in Essakane, Mali in January 2006. The festival's director Manny Ansar defined them as "One of the best performances this year-absolutely wonderful!! I am delighted Tiris were able to participate!". Programmed for the opening night, they had to perform again on the last night by popular demand.

In 2007, Tiris released their first album, entitled "Sandtracks", being the first release of British "Sandblast Arts" label, and touring England with the "Sandblast Tour", with venues in South Bank, Brighton Dome or the Musicport World Music Festival, and they were featured at BBC Radio London.

Tiris performed at the "Ollin Kan Festival" in Mexico in May 2009. The band then made an August tour in Denmark and Sweden, performing at the Malmö Festival, Copenhagen, Asaa and Follenslev.

== Musical style ==
The band played the traditional Sahrawi music, the Haul, but mixing it with other styles influences, like Desert Blues, Reggae, Flamenco, Jazz, etc... The group played traditional instruments, like the tbal or the tidinit, but also uses electric guitar, bass, keyboard, synthesizer, accordion or even a drum machine.

== Band members ==
- Ahmed Sidi Mufid AKA Mufeed - vocals
- Mohamed Said Mohamed Salem Esouilma AKA Shueta - vocals
- Ahmed Ahmed Zein AKA Ahmed Zein or Mohamed Salek - tidinit
- Emhamed Ahmed Baba Ahmed AKA Mohamed Zein - electric guitar
- Bauba Bleiel Embarek AKA Beba - keyboards
- Embarka Zeju Ajeen AKA Embarka - dancer, background vocals
- Selma Ali Did AKA Swelma - dancer, background vocals
- Boubba Han Cheikh AKA Boubba - dancer, background vocals
- Mohamed Hafsi AKA Momo - electric bass

== Discography ==
- Sandtracks (2007)
