= Najm Allal =

Najm Allal الناجم علال
- Born: 1966 (age 59–60); Ued Hawa, Smara, Spanish Sahara
- Genres: Blues music, folk music, roots music
- Occupations: Musician, songwriter
- Instruments: Vocalist, Guitarist
- Years active: 1997–current
- Formerly of: Leyoad

Najm Allal (Arabic: الناجم علال, born 1966) is a singer, guitarist and writer of lyrics in Spanish from Western Sahara.

== Biography ==
=== Life ===
He was born in a nomadic family at the Ued Hawa, near Smara (Western Sahara) in 1966. All his brothers and sisters do poetry, and his brother Mohamed Lamin and Najm were musicians. His father worked in a Spanish company who constructed a road in the zone.

In 1975, he fled with all his family to Tifariti, then Mahbes and finally Tindouf. The next year he started school in the Sahrawi refugee camps. He takes secondary education in Algerian high schools. When he finished his studies, he had to do military service, where he learned the accordion and acoustic guitar. He subsequently joined the SPLA in 1986, as part of the Sahrawi military band. In 1990 he was intended to the frontline, where he composed his first hit and one of his most known songs "Viva el POLISARIO" ("Long live the POLISARIO"), where he describes the conquest of a Moroccan position.

=== Career ===
In 1997, he was moved back to Tindouf, where he joined the musical agrupation of the Wilaya of El Aaiun in the Sahrawi refugee camps, as he left the Army. That year he got in touch with the people of the Spanish music label Nubenegra, and he started to collaborate as guitarist in many editions of the label, most notably on the v.v.a.a. album Sáhara tierra mía ("Sahara land of mine"). That album contains "Viva el POLISARIO" and another of his most known works, the theme "Canta conmigo", ("Sing with me"). He also joined the Sahrawi band Leyoad in 1998, touring Europe with the band that year, and again in 2002 presenting the album Mariem Hassan con Leyoad.

In 2003, he released his first solo album, Nar ("Fire"), sung in Arabic, and giving more protagonism to his electric guitar, in a similar way as the Mali blues groups. He is considered one of the innovators of Western Sahara's traditional music, the "Hawl". His work has been added to the World Music National Geographic database. The character of some of Allal's lyrics is highly charged politically; this reflects political uncertainties which Western Sahara has faced in recent years.

== Discography ==
=== Studio albums ===
- 2003 Nar

=== Featured in ===
- 1998 Sáhara tierra mía (CD 2 of Sahrauis: The Music of the Western Sahara)
- 2002 Mariem Hassan con Leyoad
- 2004 Medej – Cantos antiguos Saharauis
- 2007 Hugo Westerdahl – Western Sahara

== See also ==
- Music of Western Sahara
- Mariem Hassan
- Aziza Brahim
- Spanish language § Africa
