= Reaktion Books =

UK independent book publisher founded 1985

- Founded: 1985
- Country of origin: United Kingdom
- Headquarters location: Islington, London
- Distribution: Grantham Book Services (UK); Chicago Distribution Center (The Americas)
- Publication types: Books
- Official website: reaktionbooks.co.uk

Reaktion Books Limited is an independent book publisher based in Islington, London, England. It was founded in 1985 in Edinburgh, Scotland, and moved to London in 1987. Reaktion originally focused on the fields of art, architecture, and design. In recent years it has broadened to include more areas and also publishes series of books.

== Details ==
Reaktion originally focused on the fields of art, architecture, and design – its first book was Ian Hamilton Finlay: A Visual Primer by Yves Abrioux. In recent years Reaktion's list has broadened substantially, and now also encompasses animal studies, Asian art and culture, biography, cultural studies, current events, fashion, film, food history, geography, general history, music, philosophy, photography, politics, and sports history. Reaktion now produces around 70 new titles each year and has about 500 titles in print.

Among the monographs released by Reaktion are studies of the Ottoman architect Sinan and the artists Delaroche, Holbein, Tintoretto, Bellini, Malcolm Morley, Leon Golub, and Caspar David Friedrich, the last of which was awarded the 1992 Mitchell Prize for the History of Art.

Reaktion also publishes many series of books, including Animal, short natural and cultural histories of individual animals; Edible, global histories of a particular food, drink, or ingredient; Critical Lives, concise critical biographies of important cultural figures; and Earth, studies of the historical and cultural significance of natural phenomena.

Recent books of note from Reaktion include Twenty Minutes in Manhattan by Michael Sorkin, Travels in the History of Architecture by Robert Harbison, Werner Herzog – Ecstatic Truth and Other Useless Conquests by Kristoffer Hegnsvad, Boxing: A Cultural History by Kasia Boddy, Tofu: A Culinary History by Russell Thomas, and Owl by Desmond Morris.
