= Outline of the Sahrawi Arab Democratic Republic =

Overview of and topical guide to the Sahrawi Arab Democratic Republic

The Flag of the Sahrawi Arab Democratic Republic

The Coat of arms of the Sahrawi Arab Democratic Republic

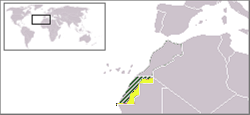
This map indicates the territory claimed by the Sahrawi Arab Democratic Republic, viz. Western Sahara (the lower half of the section shaded green). The majority of this territory is currently occupied by Morocco; the remainder is named the Free Zone by the SADR, it is marked in yellow.

The following outline is provided as an overview of and topical guide to the Sahrawi Arab Democratic Republic:

Sahrawi Arab Democratic Republic (SADR) – partially recognised state that claims sovereignty over the entire territory of Western Sahara, is a former Spanish colony. The SADR was proclaimed by the Polisario Front on February 27, 1976, in Bir Lehlou, Western Sahara. The SADR government controls about 20-25% of the territory it claims. It calls the territories under its control the Liberated Territories or the Free Zone. Morocco administers the rest of the disputed territory and calls this area its Southern Provinces. The United Nations, the SADR government and most of the countries around the world do not recognize Moroccan sovereignty over the territories occupied by Morocco and its occupation and annexation are illegal under international law.

== General reference ==
- Pronunciation: /səˈrɑːwi/ sə-RAH-wee
- Common English country name: Western Sahara
- Official English country name: The Sahrawi Arab Democratic Republic
- Common endonyms
  - الجمهورية العربية الصحراوية الديمقراطية (Arabic) – al-Jumhūrīyya al-ʿArabīyya aṣ-Ṣaḥrāwīyya ad-Dīmuqrāṭīyya
  - República Árabe Saharaui Democrática (Spanish)
- Official endonym(s):
- Adjectival(s):
- Demonym(s): Sahrawi, Saharawi, Western Saharan
- Etymology: Name of the Sahrawi Arab Democratic Republic
- ISO country codes: See the Outline of Western Sahara
- ISO region codes: See the Outline of Western Sahara
- Internet country code top-level domain: See the Outline of Western Sahara

== Geography of the Sahrawi Arab Democratic Republic ==
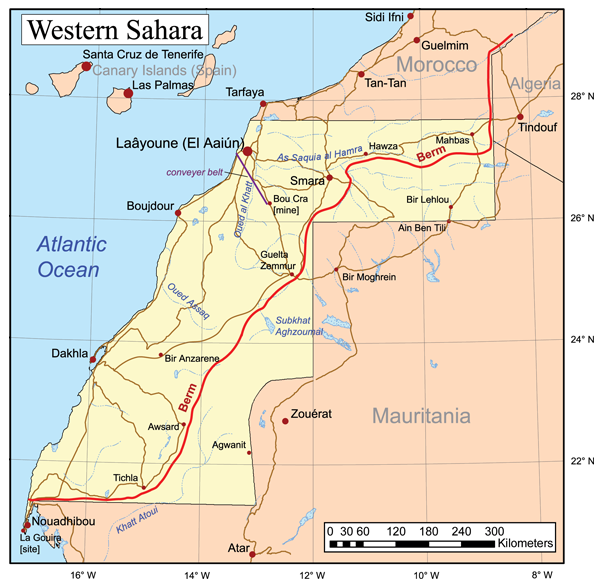
The red line indicates the Moroccan Wall. The territory to the east of it is the Free Zone, controlled by the SADR.

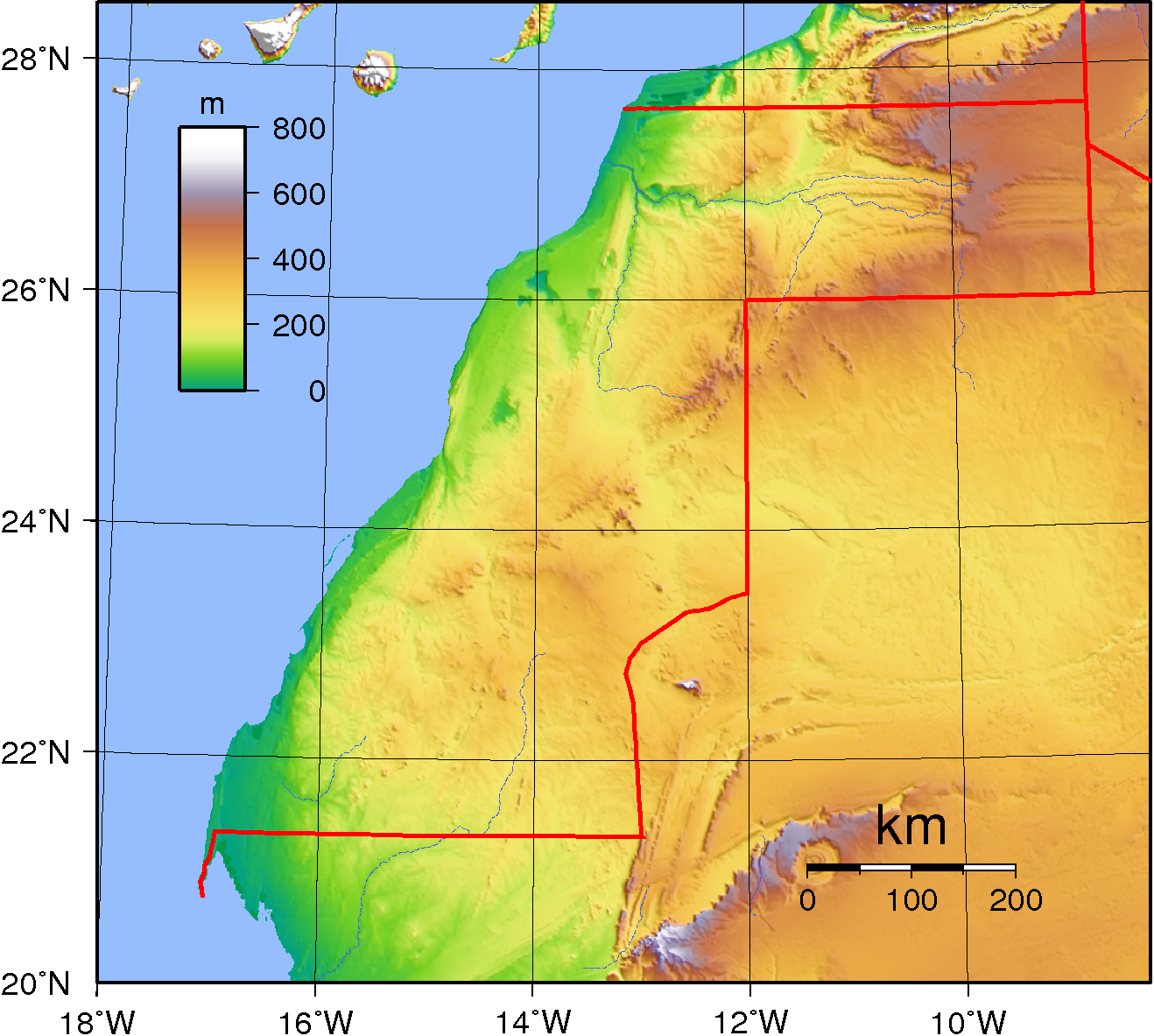
An enlargeable topographic map of Western Sahara

Geography of the Sahrawi Arab Democratic Republic

- Sahrawi Arab Democratic Republic is: a republic in exile, holding but a small portion of the territory they claim
- Location
  - Sahrawi Arab Democratic Republic is situated within the following regions of the world:
    - Northern Hemisphere and Western Hemisphere
    - Africa
      - Sahara Desert
      - North Africa
        - Western Sahara
  - Territory claimed: Western Sahara
  - Territory held: Free Zone
  - Location of most of the citizens in exile: Sahrawi refugee camps (self-managed camps in Tindouf Province, Algeria)
  - Time zone: Coordinated Universal Time UTC+00
- Atlas of the Sahrawi Arab Democratic Republic

=== Environment of Western Sahara ===
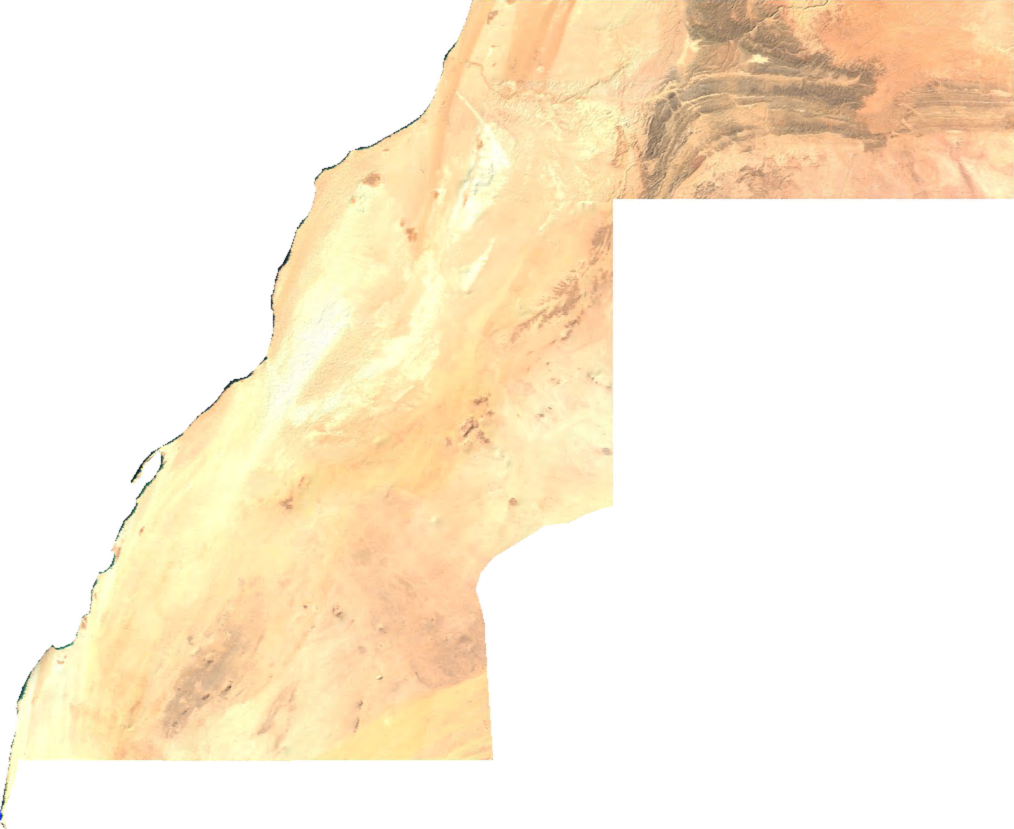
An enlargeable satellite image of Western Sahara

Environment of Western Sahara

- Climate of Western Sahara
- Ecoregions in Western Sahara
- Wildlife of Western Sahara
  - Fauna of Western Sahara
    - Birds of Western Sahara
    - Mammals of Western Sahara

=== Natural geographic features of Western Sahara ===
Landforms in Western Sahara

- Deserts in Western Sahara
  - Sahara
- Glaciers in Western Sahara: none
- World Heritage Sites in Western Sahara: None

=== Administrative divisions of the Sahrawi Arab Democratic Republic ===
Regions of Western Sahara

- Free Zone – area that lies between the Moroccan Wall and the border with Algeria.
- Sahrawi refugee camps – self-managed camps in Tindouf Province, Algeria
- The SADR claims the rest of Western Sahara, but the portion west of the Moroccan Wall is occupied by Morocco.
- Provinces of Western Sahara
  - Districts of Western Sahara

==== Municipalities of the Sahrawi Arab Democratic Republic ====
- Capital of the Sahrawi Arab Democratic Republic:
  - Tifariti – temporary capital and headquarters of the Polisario Front
  - El Aaiún (de jure) – headquarters of Moroccan occupation, but still considered by the SADR to be its true capital
- Towns within the Free Zone, administered by the Sahrawi Arab Democratic Republic
  - Tifariti (تيفاريتي) – temporary capital and headquarters of the Polisario Front
  - Bir Lehlou (بير لحلو) former temporary capital
  - Meharrize (محيرس)
  - Zug
  - Dougaj
  - Agounit (أغوانيت)
  - Mijek (Miyek, ميجك)
- For the rest of the cities and towns within Western Sahara claimed by the SADR, see List of cities in Western Sahara

== Government and politics of the Sahrawi Arab Democratic Republic ==
Politics of the Sahrawi Arab Democratic Republic Politics of Western Sahara

=== State ===
- Polisario
- Popular Front for the Liberation of Saguia el Hamra and Rio de Oro
- Western Sahara Authority
- Sahrawi Arab Democratic Republic
- Capital of the Sahrawi Arab Democratic Republic:
  - Tifariti – temporary provincial capital
  - El Aaiún – claimed capital of the SADR, occupied by Morocco
  - Tindouf, Algeria
  - Bir Lehlou – temporary capital of the SADR

=== Elections ===
- Elections in the Sahrawi Arab Democratic Republic
  - Sahrawi legislative election, 2008
- Political parties in the Sahrawi Arab Democratic Republic
- International recognition of the Sahrawi Arab Democratic Republic
- Former members of the Polisario Front

=== Branches of the government of the Sahrawi Arab Democratic Republic ===
Government of the Sahrawi Arab Democratic Republic

==== Executive branch of the government of the Sahrawi Arab Democratic Republic ====
- Head of state: President of the Sahrawi Arab Democratic Republic, Brahim Ghali
- Head of government: Prime Minister of the Sahrawi Arab Democratic Republic, Bucharaya Hamudi Beyun

==== Legislative branch of the government of the Sahrawi Arab Democratic Republic ====
- Sahrawi National Council

==== Judicial branch of the government of the Sahrawi Arab Democratic Republic ====
- Court system of the Sahrawi Arab Democratic Republic

=== Foreign relations of the Sahrawi Arab Democratic Republic ===
Foreign relations of the Sahrawi Arab Democratic Republic

- International recognition of the Sahrawi Arab Democratic Republic
  - Diplomatic missions in the Sahrawi Arab Democratic Republic
  - Diplomatic missions of the Sahrawi Arab Democratic Republic
- Relations with Algeria
- Relations with Cuba
- Relations with East Timor
- Relations with Mexico
- Relations with Nigeria
- Relations with Panama
- Relations with South Africa
- Relations with Venezuela

==== International organization membership ====
- African Union (AU)
- World Federation of Trade Unions (WFTU)

=== Law and order in the Sahrawi Arab Democratic Republic ===
Law of Western Sahara

- Constitution of the Sahrawi Arab Democratic Republic
- Human rights in the Sahrawi Arab Democratic Republic
  - LGBT rights in the Sahrawi Arab Democratic Republic
- Human rights in Western Sahara
- Law enforcement in Western Sahara

=== Military of the Sahrawi Arab Democratic Republic ===
Military of the Sahrawi Arab Democratic Republic

- Command
  - Commander-in-chief: Secretary General of the Polisario Front
- Forces
  - Army: Sahrawi People's Liberation Army, with 6,000 to 7,000 active troops.
  - Navy: none
  - Air Force: none

== History of the Sahrawi Arab Democratic Republic ==
Stages of the Moroccan Wall.

History of Western Sahara

- Hanno the Navigator – Carthaginian explorer c. 500 BC, best known for his naval exploration of the African coast.
- Sanhaja – a nomadic people who were once one of the largest Berber tribal confederations of the Maghreb region.
  - Almoravid dynasty – during the 11th century, the Sanhaja tribal confederation allied with the Lamtuna tribe to found the Almoravid dynasty.
- Trans-Saharan trade – throughout history, some trade routes crossed this region, particularly to and from the Ghana Empire during the Middle Ages.

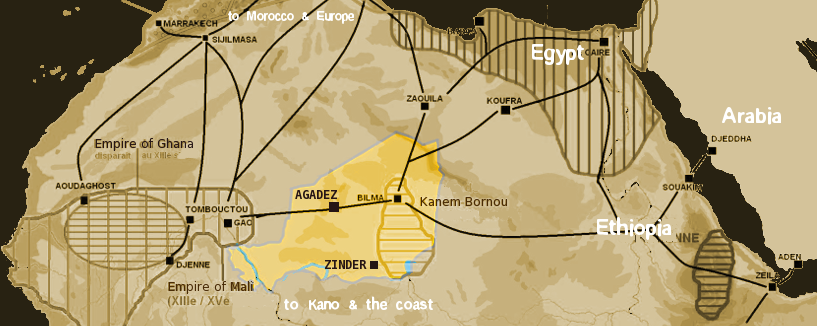
Saharan trade routes circa 1400, with the modern territory of Niger highlighted

- Spanish Sahara – name used for the modern territory of Western Sahara when it was ruled as a colonial territory by Spain between 1884 and 1975.
  - Ifni War – series of armed incursions into Spanish West Africa by Moroccan insurgents and Sahrawi rebels that began in October 1957 and culminated with the abortive siege of Sidi Ifni.
  - Polisario Front emerges – formally constituted on May 10, 1973 with the express intention of militarily forcing an end to Spanish colonization.
    - El-Ouali Mustapha Sayed – first Secretary General of the Polisario Front.
  - Green March – strategic mass demonstration in November 1975, coordinated by the Moroccan government, to force Spain to hand over the disputed, autonomous semi-metropolitan Spanish Province of Sahara to Morocco. The demonstration of some 350,000 Moroccans advanced several miles into the Western Sahara territory, escorted by near 100,000 Moroccan troops (camouflaged as civilians and uniformed), and meeting very little response by the Sahrawi Polisario Front.
  - Madrid Accords – treaty between Spain, Morocco, and Mauritania to end the Spanish presence in the territory of Spanish Sahara, which was until the Madrid Accords' inception a Spanish province and former colony.
  - Tropas Nómadas – auxiliary regiment to the colonial army in Spanish Sahara composed of Sahrawi tribesmen, equipped with small arms and led by Spanish officers, guarding outposts and sometimes conducting patrols on camelback. Following the Spanish Government's decision to hand over the territory to Morocco and Mauritania towards the end of 1975, numbers of them deserted. Many of the Tropas Nómadas soldiers are believed to have joined Polisario and Spanish-trained fighters formed the core of the Sahrawi People's Liberation Army set up to fight Morocco and Mauritania after the Green March.
  - 1975 United Nations visiting mission to Spanish Sahara – United Nations General Assembly in 1975 dispatched a visiting mission to the territory and the surrounding countries, in accordance with its resolution 3292 (December 13, 1974), to assist in the decolonization process.
- Western Sahara conflict – ongoing conflict between the Polisario Front of the Sahrawi people and the state of Morocco. The conflict is the continuation of the past insurgency by Polisario against the Spanish colonial forces in 1973-1975 and the subsequent Western Sahara War between the Polisario and Morocco (1975–1991).
  - Western Sahara War – armed struggle between the Sahrawi Polisario Front and Morocco between 1975 and 1991, being the most significant phase of the Western Sahara conflict.
    - Polisario declaration of independence – took place in 1976, establishing the Sahrawi Arab Democratic Republic.
    - Sahrawi refugee camps – set up in the Tindouf Province, Algeria in 1975-76 for Sahrawi refugees fleeing from Moroccan forces. With most refugees still living in the camps, the refugee situation is among the most protracted ones worldwide.
    - First Battle of Amgala (1976) – Units from the Algerian Army were attacked by units from the Royal Moroccan Armed Forces on the night of 27 January. Algeria claimed their troops were providing food and medical supplies to refugees at Amgala, while Morocco said the Algerian troops were heavily armed and were aiding Polisario.
    - Settlement Plan – agreement made in 1991 between the Polisario Front and Morocco on the organization of a referendum, which would constitute an expression of self-determination for the people of Western Sahara, leading either to full independence, or integration with the kingdom of Morocco. It resulted in a cease-fire which remains in effect (more or less) to this day.
    - United Nations Security Council Resolution 690 – adopted unanimously on 29 April 1991, established MINURSO (see below) to implement the Settlement Plan (see above).
      - United Nations Mission for the Referendum in Western Sahara (MINURSO) – UN peacekeeping mission in Western Sahara established in 1991 under United Nations Security Council Resolution 690 as part of the Settlement Plan, which had paved way for a cease-fire in the conflict between Morocco and the Polisario Front (as the Sahrawi Arab Democratic Republic) over the contested territory of Western Sahara (formerly Spanish Sahara).
  - Independence Intifada – series of disturbances, demonstrations and riots that broke out in May 2005 in the Moroccan-occupied parts of Western Sahara and south of Morocco.
    - Gdeim Izik protest camp – protest camp in Western Sahara established by a group of Sahrawis on 9 October 2010 and lasting into November, with related incidents occurring in the aftermath of its dismantlement on 8 November. It has been suggested by Noam Chomsky, that the month-long protest encampment at Gdeim Izik constituted the start of the Arab Spring, traditionally considered to be the self-immolation of Mohamed Bouazizi in Tunisia on 17 December 2010.
    - 2011 Western Saharan protests – began on 25 February 2011 as a reaction to the failure of police to prevent anti-Sahrawi looting in the city of Dakhla, Western Sahara, and blossomed into protests across the territory. They were related to the Gdeim Izik protest camp in Western Sahara established the previous fall, which had resulted in violence between Sahrawi activists and Moroccan security forces and supporters.
- Former members of the Polisario Front

== Demographics of Western Sahara ==
Demographics of Western Sahara

== Culture of the Sahrawi Arab Democratic Republic ==
Culture of Western Sahara

=== National symbols ===
- National symbols of the Sahrawi Arab Democratic Republic
  - Coat of arms of the Sahrawi Arab Democratic Republic
  - Flag of the Sahrawi Arab Democratic Republic
  - National anthem of the Sahrawi Arab Democratic Republic
- Public holidays in the Sahrawi Arab Democratic Republic

=== Culture ===
- Languages of Western Sahara
- National symbols of Western Sahara
  - Coat of arms of Western Sahara
  - Flag of Western Sahara
  - National anthem of Western Sahara
- Public holidays in Western Sahara
- Religion in Western Sahara
  - Christianity in Western Sahara
  - Hinduism in Western Sahara
  - Islam in Western Sahara
  - Sikhism in Western Sahara
- World Heritage Sites in Western Sahara: None

=== Art in Western Sahara ===
- Music of Western Sahara
  - Sahrauis: The Music of the Western Sahara
- Television in Western Sahara

=== People of Western Sahara ===
==== Persons and personalities ====
- Djema'a
- El-Ouali Mustapha Sayed
- James Baker
- Ma El Ainin
- Marrack Goulding
- Hassan II of Morocco
- Mohammed VI of Morocco
- Mohamed Abdelaziz
- Javier Pérez de Cuéllar

=== Sports in Western Sahara ===
Sports in Western Sahara

- Football in Western Sahara
  - Sahrawi Football Federation
  - Sahrawi national football team
  - Sahrawi Republic Cup

== Economy and infrastructure of the Sahrawi Arab Democratic Republic ==
Economy of Western Sahara

- Economic rank, by nominal GDP (2007):
- Currency of Western Sahara: Dirham (Imposed in The Occupied Territories under duress and illegal military occupation)
  - ISO 4217: MAD
- In Free Zone and Refugee Camps: Peseta Saharaui (de iure)
  - ISO 4217: EHP
  - (de facto) Euro, Franco, Dólar, Ouguiya, Dinar
- Health in Western Sahara
- Transport in Western Sahara
  - Airports in Western Sahara
  - Rail transport in Western Sahara
  - Road transport in Western Sahara

=== Communications of SADR ===
Communications in Western Sahara

- Sahara Press Service
- Internet in Western Sahara
  - .eh

== Education in the Sahrawi Arab Democratic Republic ==
Education in Western Sahara

- Zawiya
- Universities in Western Sahara
  - University of Tifariti

== See also ==
- List of international rankings
- Outline of Africa
- Outline of geography
