= Vehicle registration plates of the Sahrawi Arab Democratic Republic =

The Sahrawi Arab Democratic Republic requires its residents to register their motor vehicles and display vehicle registration plates.

== Format ==
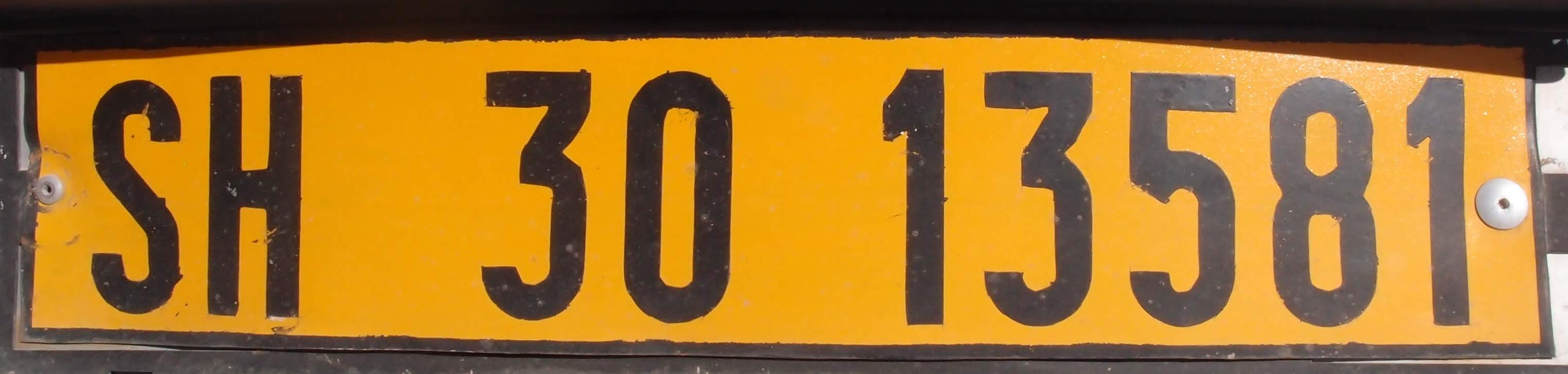
Sahrawi private registration plate

Sahrawi cars are marked by the following tokens. Regular license plates have format SH-12-34567, yellow with black characters, implemented in 1976.

SH 12 34567

Government license plates have format GSH-12-34567, green with black characters, also implemented from 1976.

GSH 12 34567

== History ==
Before 1976 there were operating Spanish plates series SH.

SH 123456

== Special license plates ==
Plates of Sahrawi People's Liberation Army have format 123456789, white with black markings and with Sahrawi flag, implemented from 1976.

123456789

There are also plates of MINURSO vehicles in use from 1991.

MIN-123

== Gallery ==
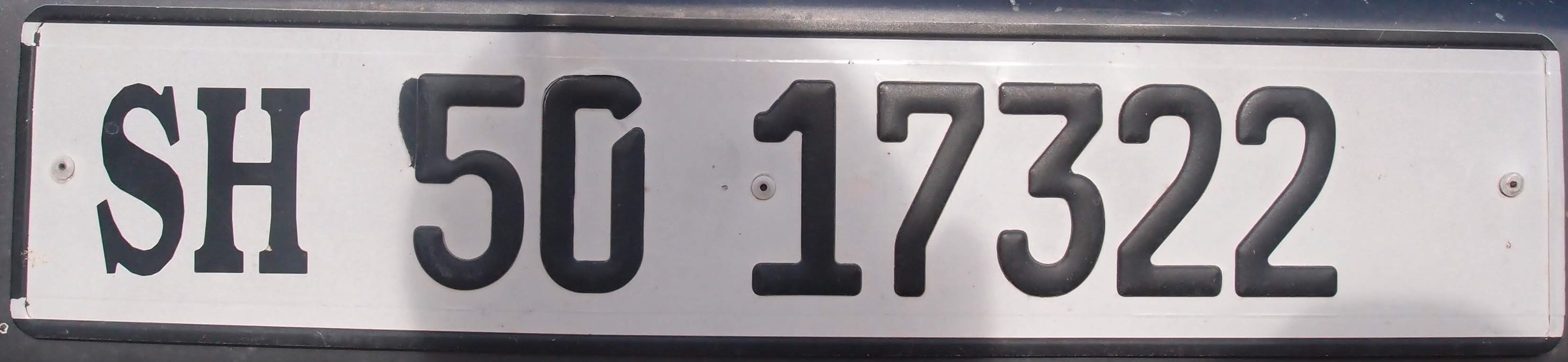
Sahrawi private registration plate

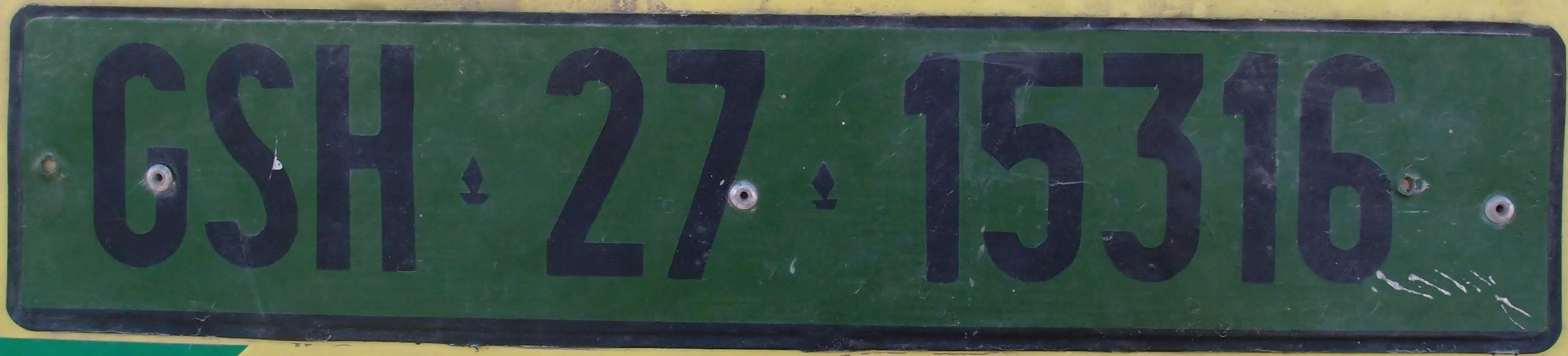
Sahrawi government registration plate

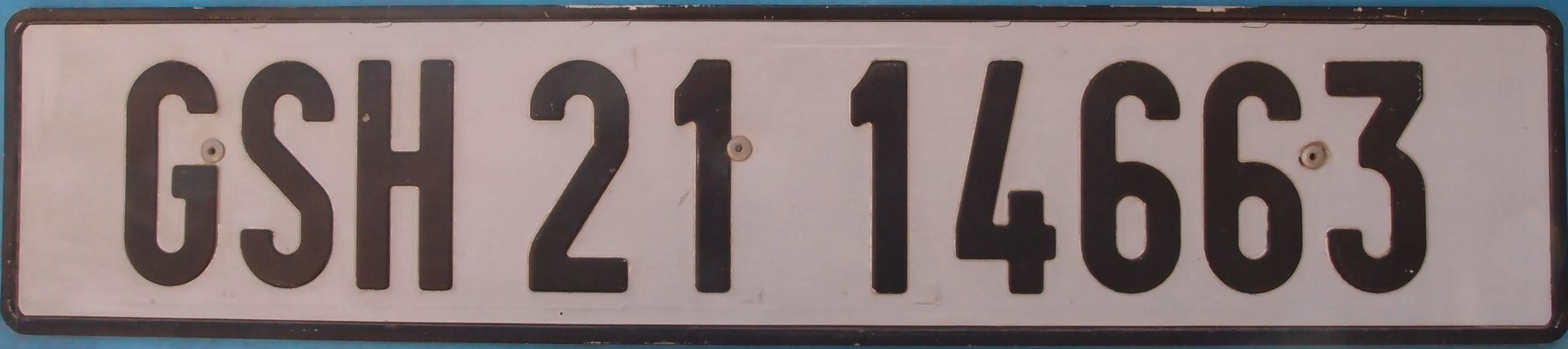
Sahrawi government registration plate

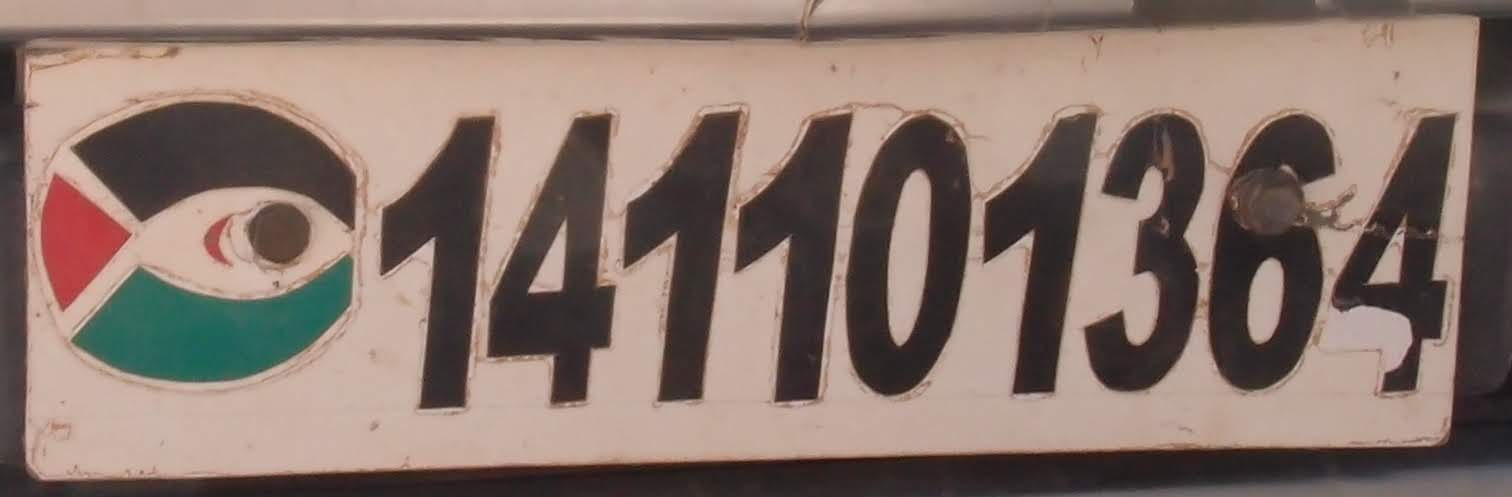
Sahrawi People's Liberation Army registration plate
