= Sahrawi Arab Democratic Republic–Venezuela relations =

- Sahrawi Arab Democratic Republic: Venezuela

Sahrawi Republic–Venezuela relations refers to the current and historical relations between the Sahrawi Arab Democratic Republic (SADR) and Venezuela.

== History ==
Venezuela recognized the SADR on August 3, 1982, and formal diplomatic relations were established in December that year, during the Luis Herrera Campins government. A Sahrawi embassy was opened in Caracas in 1982, and the Venezuelan embassy in Algiers was accredited to the SADR.

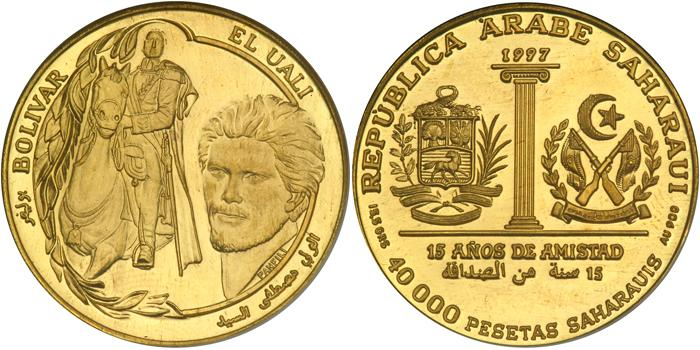
Gold 40,000 Sahrawi pesetas. 15th Anniversary of diplomatic relations between the SADR and Venezuela (1997)

On 5 October 2004, an Integral Cooperation Convention was signed by Venezuelan Minister of Energy and Mines Rafael Ramírez and Sahrawi Cooperation Minister Salek Baba. On 31 January 2007, eleven Sahrawi students arrived in Venezuela to make oil refining studies in Cumaná, within the scope of the International Scholarship Program of Venezuela. In April 2010, the Venezuelan Foreign Affairs Viceminister for Africa Reinaldo Bolívar met in the framework of the convention with Sahrawi ambassador Omar Emboirik Ahmed, reviewing the possibilities of educational cooperation. On 27 October 2011, the complementary accord to the Integral Water Resources Cooperation Convention was signed by Viceminister of Water of the Venezuelan Ministry of Environment and Natural Resources Cristóbal Francisco Ortiz and the Sahrawi ambassador.

On 21 March 2023, The two states signed a series of agreements to strengthen their political, diplomatic, social and economic alliances.
