= Telecommunications in Western Sahara =

Telecommunications in Western Sahara include radio, television, fixed and mobile telephones, and the Internet.

Morocco claims the Western Sahara territory and administers Moroccan law through Moroccan institutions in the estimated 85 percent of the territory it occupies. The Popular Front for the Liberation of Saguia el Hamra and Rio de Oro (Polisario), an organization that has sought independence for the former Spanish territory since 1973, disputes Morocco's claim to sovereignty over the territory. Because of this long running dispute, many traditional telecommunication statistics are not reported separately for the Western Sahara.

== Radio and television ==
- Radio stations:
  - Morocco's state broadcaster, Société Nationale de Radiodiffusion et de Télévision (SNRT, formerly RTM) operates a radio service from Laayoune (2008);
  - Polisario-backed medium wave (AM) and shortwave radio stations are on the air (2008);
  - Unofficial amateur radio stations occasionally operate from Polisario territory. This is classified as the DXCC entity "Western Sahara". Operators use callsigns with the prefix "S0"; an informal identifier that has not been issued by the International Telecommunication Union.
- Radios: 56,000 (1997).
- Television stations: Morocco's state broadcaster, SNRT, operates a TV service that is relayed in the territory (2008). The Polisario-owned territory operates a minor television service known by the name of RASD TV.
- Television sets: 6,000 (1997).

== Telephones ==
- Calling code: +212
- International call prefix: 00
- Main lines: about 2,000 lines in use (1999 estimate).
- Mobile cellular: Unknown.
- Telephone system: sparse and limited system; tied into Morocco's system by microwave radio relay, tropospheric scatter, and satellite (2008).
- Satellite earth stations: 2 Intelsat (Atlantic Ocean) linked to Rabat, Morocco (2008).

== Internet ==
- Top-level domain: none, as a disputed territory no country code top-level domain (ccTLD) is assigned, however, .eh is reserved for this purpose, and will be assigned if the competing claimants reach an agreement.
- Internet users: unknown (2012).
- Fixed broadband: unknown (2012).
- Wireless broadband: unknown (2012).
- Internet hosts: no hosts explicitly associated with Western Sahara (2012).
- IPv4: no addresses allocated (2012).
- Internet service providers (ISPs): NA

== Internet censorship and surveillance ==
There is no indication that Internet access in the territory differs from that in internationally recognized Morocco, which was generally open. Morocco was listed as engaged in selective Internet filtering in the social, conflict/security, and Internet tools areas and as little or no evidence of filtering in the political area by the OpenNet Initiative (ONI) in August 2009. Freedom House listed Morocco's "Internet Freedom Status" as "Partly Free" in its 2013 Freedom on the Net report.

Morocco considers the part of the territory that it occupies to be an integral component of the kingdom with the same laws and structures regarding civil liberties, political, and economic rights. Moroccan law prohibits citizens from criticizing Islam or the institution of the monarchy or to oppose the government's official position regarding territorial integrity and Western Sahara. Saharan media outlets and bloggers practice self-censorship on these issues, and there are no reports of government action against them for what they write. Human rights and Sahrawi bloggers affiliated with leftist political groups assume that authorities closely monitor their activities and feel the need to hide their identities.

== See also ==
- Telecommunications in Morocco
- Société Nationale de Radiodiffusion et de Télévision (SNRT), the public broadcaster of Morocco.
