= Nouakchott raid (1976) =

First Nouackchott raid
- Part of Western Sahara War
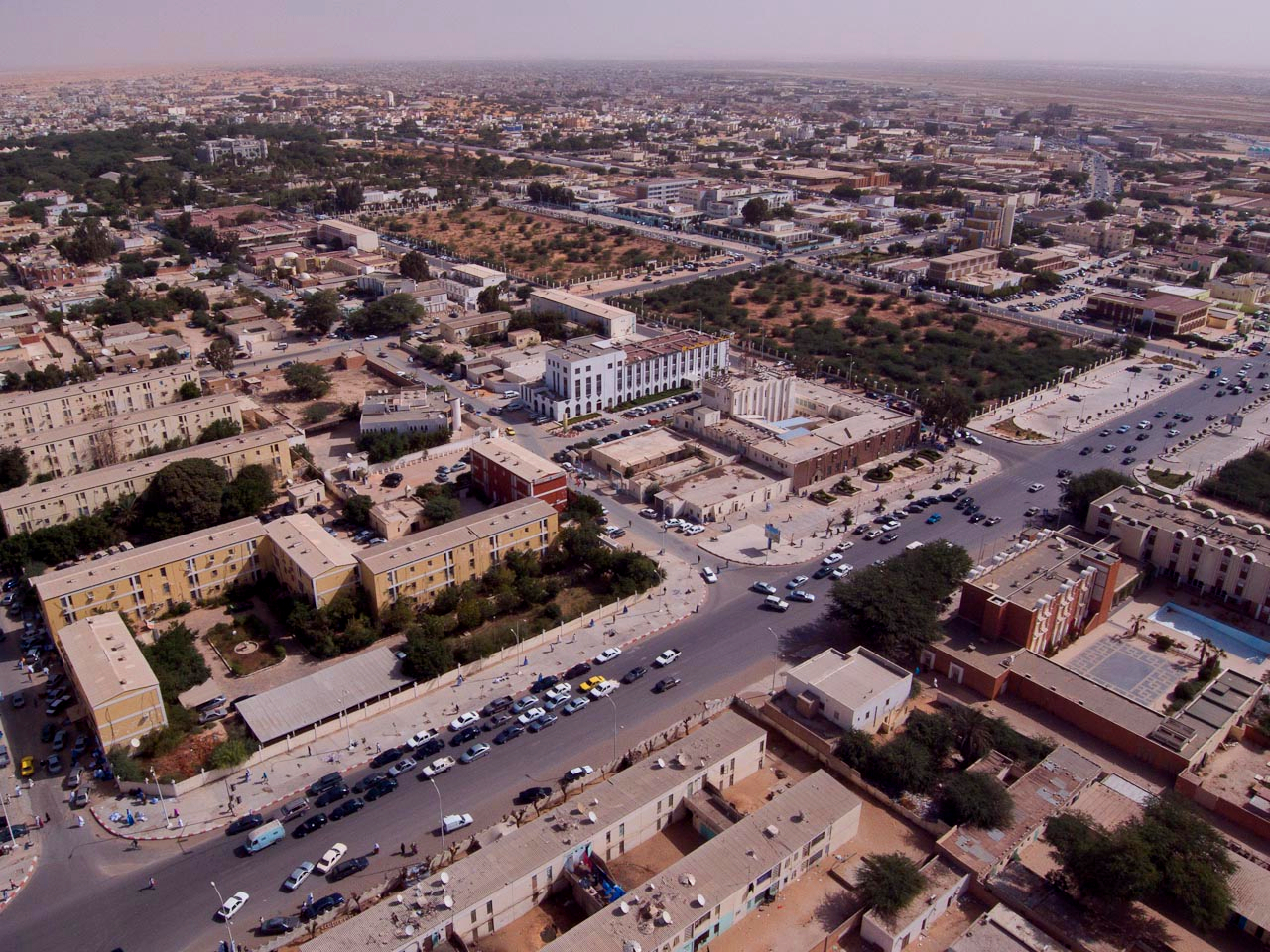
- Nouakchott in 2017
Date	8 June 1976
Location	Nouakchott, Mauritania
Result	Mauritanian victory: First president of SADR El-Ouali Mustapha Sayed killed; Polisario fighters were pushed back by Mauritanian army; Polisario failed overthrow of the regime of Moktar Ould Daddah

Belligerents
Mauritania	Sahrawi Arab Democratic Republic; Polisario Front

Commanders and leaders
(Mauritania) Moktar Ould Daddah (Mauritania) Col. Ahmed Ould Bouceif (Mauritania) Lt-Col. Mohammed Khouna Ould Heydallah	El-Ouali Mustapha Sayed †

Strength
(Mauritania) +400 under Ahmed Ould Bouceif	+500 (several hundred guerrillas)

Casualties and losses
(Mauritania) 4 killed, +10 injured	100–200 killed

The raid on Nouakchott in June 1976 was a significant military operation carried out by the Polisario Front, a Western Saharan guerrilla group, against the Mauritanian capital, Nouakchott. Led by their leader El-Ouali Mustapha Sayed, the Polisario forces aimed to overthrow the regime of President Moktar Ould Daddah.

== Prelude ==
In early June 1976, a force of several hundred Polisario guerrillas, led by El-Ouali Mustapha Sayed, embarked on a raid from their rear base in Tindouf, Algeria. The convoy consisted of approximately a hundred vehicles, including several Berliet-Algerian trucks loaded with ammunition, communication equipment, fuel, and supplies. They were equipped with heavy weaponry, such as 120mm mortars and 110mm recoilless Russian cannons. Surprisingly, there were also "anti-aircraft ramps," although these were not utilized during the raid.

The main objective of the raid was to reach Nouakchott, the capital of Mauritania, which had been left practically undefended as most of the country's armed forces were stationed far to the north. The Polisario forces planned to launch an attack on President Moktar Ould Daddah's residence.

== Initial skirmishes and raid ==
The Polisario convoy was spotted by a Mauritanian pilot on June 5, near the town of Zouérate, which led to the Mauritanian forces realizing the true objective of the Polisario's raid. Responding swiftly, Mauritanian forces, under the command of Lt.-Col. Ahmed Ould Bouceif, sent 400 troops to intercept the Polisario before they could reach Nouakchott. Despite Mauritanian efforts, the Polisario guerrillas reached the outskirts of the capital on June 8.

On the morning of June 8, the Polisario forces managed to shell the grounds of President Ould Daddah's residence for approximately 30 minutes. However, due to the absence of the element of surprise and reinforced Mauritanian defenses, they had to retreat.

== Casualties and aftermath ==
The retreat of the Polisario forces was met with fierce resistance from Mauritanian troops, particularly near the settlement of Bennichab on June 9. Hundreds of insurgents were killed in the ensuing battle. Notably, the raid resulted in the death of Polisario's Secretary-General, El Ouali, and his military deputy, about 100 kilometers north of Nouakchott. Polisario forces suffered over 200 casualties, and almost an equal number were taken as prisoners. On the Mauritanian side, four soldiers lost their lives, and around ten were injured during the raid.
