= El-Ouali Mustapha Sayed =

Sahrawi President in 1976

- الوالي مصطفى السيد

1st President of the Sahrawi Republic
- In office 29 February 1976 – 9 June 1976
- Prime Minister: Mohamed Lamine Ould Ahmed
- Preceded by: Position established
- Succeeded by: Mohamed Abdelaziz

Personal details
- Born: 1948 Bir Lehlou, Spanish Sahara, Spanish West Africa or Agyeiyimat, French West Africa
- Died: 9 June 1976 (aged 27–28) Inchiri Region, Mauritania
- Party: POLISARIO
- Education: Mohammed V University, Rabat, Morocco

Military service
- Battles/wars: Western Sahara War: Second Battle of Amgala; Nouakchott raid (1976) †

El-Ouali Mustapha Sayed (Note: Also known as El Uali, El-Wali, Luali or Lulei; Arabic: الوالي مصطفى السيد) (1948 – 9 June 1976) was a Sahrawi nationalist leader who was the co-founder and second secretary-general of the Polisario Front.

== Youth and background ==
El-Ouali was born in 1948 in a Sahrawi nomad encampment somewhere on the hammada desert plains in eastern Spanish Sahara or northern Mauritania; some sources give his place of birth as Bir Lehlou, a location that is symbolic for the Polisario Front, for being the place of the proclamation of the Sahrawi Arab Democratic Republic (SADR). His parents were poor and his father disabled, and with the sum of the severe drought on the Sahara that year, and the consequences of the Ifni War, the family had to abandon the traditional bedouin lifestyle of the Sahrawis, settling near Tan-Tan (nowadays southern Morocco) at the late 1950s. Some sources stated that Ouali's family was deported among others to Morocco by Spanish authorities in 1960.

He went to primary school in Tan-Tan in 1962, and then to the Islamic Institute in Taroudannt in 1966 with impressive results, being awarded scholarships to attend university in Rabat in 1970. There he studied law and political sciences, and met other young members of the Sahrawi diaspora, who like him were affected by the radicalism sweeping Moroccan universities in the early 1970s (heavily influenced by May 1968 in France). He was the first alumnus in the history of Moroccan universities on achieving a punctuation of 19 out of 20 in Constitutional law. He travelled to Europe for the only time in his life about this time, visiting Amsterdam in the Netherlands & Paris in France.

El-Ouali Mustapha Sayed was associated with Ila al-Amam, a clandestine Marxist group that took a position explicitly in favor of Sahrawi self-determination.

== Polisario Front ==
El-Ouali grew increasingly disturbed by the oppressive Spanish colonial rule over what was then known as Spanish Sahara, and although never involved with the Harakat Tahrir, news of the Zemla Intifada made a deep impression on him. In 1972, he returned to Tan-Tan (former Spanish Sahara), where he began organizing a group called the Embryonic Movement for the Liberation of Saguia el-Hamra and Río de Oro.

After a Sahrawi demonstration in Tan-Tan in June 1972, a group of 20 participants including Ouali were detained and tortured by the Moroccan police; then he met with other groups of Sahrawis from inside Western Sahara, Algeria & Mauritania, and in 1973 founded with them the Polisario Front. Days after the Polisario's foundation, El-Ouali and Brahim Ghali led a group of six poorly armed guerrillas in the 20 May 1973 El-Khanga raid, the first armed action of the Polisario Front (El-Khanga was a Spanish military post in the desert). El-Ouali and another fighter were briefly captured, but they managed to escape when the remaining patrol headed by Ghali overran the ill-prepared Spanish troops. The Khanga strike was to be followed by similar attacks on isolated targets, in which the POLISARIO gathered weapons and equipment, until they were finally able to enter into full-scale guerrilla warfare.

In April 1974, El-Ouali headed the Polisario delegation that took part in the Pan African Youth Movement meeting in Benghazi, Libya.

In August 1974, El-Ouali was elected Secretary-General of the Polisario, replacing Brahim Ghali on the post.

In 1974–75 the Polisario Front slowly seized control over the desert countryside, and quickly became the most important nationalist organization in the country.

By 1975 Spain had been forced to retreat into the major coastal cities, and reluctantly accepted negotiations on the surrender of power. At this point, the Polisario remained a relatively small organization of perhaps 800 fighters and activists, although supported by a vastly larger network of sympathizers.

According to claims by Alexander Mehdi Bennouna in his book Héros Sans Gloire, El-Ouali was the son of a member of the Moroccan Army of Liberation. Allegedly, he was a member of Union National des Étudiants Marocains (UNEM), the students union in Morocco and was recruited by Mohamed Bennouna to join the "Tanzim" (The Organization or the Structure), an Arabic nationalist and socialist organization which was created to overthrow the monarchy under King Hassan II and obtained support from Syria, Libya, and Algeria. El-Ouali was supposedly trained in Libya and his mentor was a man named "Nemri". Bennouna claims the death of Mahmoud and Nemri, as well as the fluctuating relationship between Tanzim and Algeria led to the creation of the Polisario Front. Bennouna personally views this as part of the armed revolution in Morocco and of the political dissidence against the Moroccan regime.

== Exile and war ==
After the joint Moroccan–Mauritanian invasion of Western Sahara in late 1975, and the Moroccan air raids on Sahrawi refugees columns in the desert, El-Ouali escorted them into exile in the refugee camps of Tindouf, Algeria. From there, as the Secretary-general of Polisario he presided over the establishing of the Sahrawi Arab Democratic Republic. The Sahrawi republic effectively became the government of some 50,000–60,000 people in 1976, housed in the Tindouf refugee camps. At that point, the Polisario Front, backed by Algeria and Libya, reinforced a guerrilla war against Morocco and Mauritania, who had substantially larger forces and armament, mostly from French and Spanish origin. The usual tactic of the Polisario guerrillas consisted in raids (sometimes of hundreds of km) on military objectives like Moroccan military posts on Tarfaya, Amgala or Guelta Zemmur, or economic objectives, as the Bou Craa phosphate conveyor belt, the Zouerat iron mines and the Mauritania Railway.

By all accounts, El-Ouali was intensely charismatic, and often made public speeches in the refugee camps. He frequently met with foreign journalists visiting the camps, acknowledging the importance of publicizing the Sahrawi struggle. He was widely respected by his compatriots for his habit of fighting at the front line with his troops, although this would ultimately prove a fatal choice.

== Death in combat ==
On 9 June 1976 El-Ouali was killed by a shrapnel piece through the head returning from a major Polisario raid on the Mauritanian capital, Nouakchott, in which they bombarded the Presidential palace. In the retreat, pursued by Mauritanian troops, armored vehicles and aviation, a group with Ouali separated from the principal column, going to Benichab (about 100 km north of Nouakchott) with the intention of destroying the water pipeline that supplied the capital. Other sources claim that the subsequent combat took place 60 km (37 mi) north of Akjoujt. They were surrounded and cornered by Mauritanian troops with Panhard AMLs and then annihilated. Ouali's body was sent to Nouakchott and buried secretly in a military terrain (in 1996, 20 years after his death, his exact resting place was revealed), where it still lies. His position as Secretary-General was briefly assumed in an interim capacity by Mahfoud Ali Beiba, who was then replaced by Mohammed Abdelaziz at the Polisario's III General Popular Congress in August 1976.

== Legacy and depictions in popular culture ==
=== Books ===
A book containing two letters and a speech of El Uali was published in 1978 entitled "Three texts: Two letters and a speech", being reedited in 2010. In 1997, the University of Alicante published the book "Luali: Now or never, the liberty", a joint effort by Spanish writer and prosecutor Felipe Briones and Sahrawi writers Mohamed Limam Mohamed Ali and Mahayub Salek, being the first published biography about El Ouali's life and legacy.

=== Eponyms ===
- El Uali Mustapha Sayed Special School, Cuban public educational institution, located in Marianao, Havana.
- Martyr El Wali Mostapha Military School, Sahrawi military institution, located in the Sahrawi refugee camps, Tindouf province, Algeria.

=== Quotes ===
Some selected quotes:

- "Anything usurped by force can only be recovered by force"
- "If you want your right is needed to sacrifice your blood"
- "Morocco and Mauritania were tiny enemies in comparison to illiteracy"
- "Stand together until the regaining of our land"
- "Moroccan revolutionary organizations have themselves at the service of the system, revolutionary leaders take the suitcases of the King, support the regime in its invasion and occupation of Western Sahara, support the occupation of our country and the expulsion of our people out of their homeland into exile"

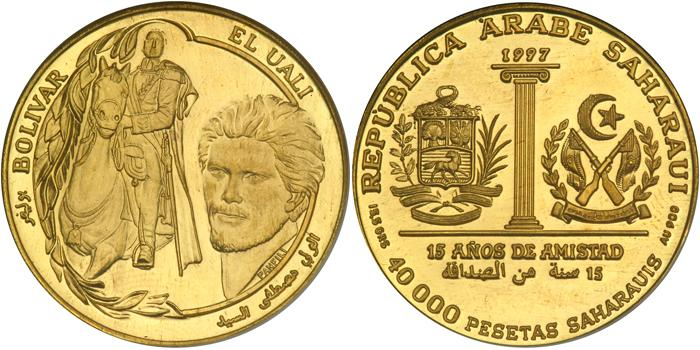
1997, 40000 Pesetas coin.

=== Coins ===
El-Ouali image appears on 2 Gold coins of 40,000 Sahrawi Pesetas of Western Sahara minted in 1997. One-coin weighs 15.5 grams, purity 900 out of 1,000, Mintage: 90 Pieces, the other coin weighs 15.52 grams, purity 999 out of 1,000, Mintage: 10 Pieces has a Proof quality. Both coins depict El-Ouali alongside of Simon Bolivar and were minted to commemorate 15 years of friendship between Western Sahara and Venezuela.

=== Music ===
The Sahrawi traditional music group "Shahid El Hafed Buyema" changed their name to "Shahid El Uali" shortly afterwards his death in combat.

=== National holidays ===
El-Ouali is revered as a Father of the Nation by the Sahrawi refugee population, and there is a simple stone memorial built to his honor in the desert. The day of his death, 9 June, has been declared The Day of the Martyrs, a holiday of the republic that honors all Sahrawi victims in the war for independence.

In Mauritania, the 9 June was declared by President Mokhtar Ould Daddah the day of the Mauritanian Armed Forces.

== See also ==
- Polisario Front
- Front Polisario Khat al-Shahid
- Politics of Western Sahara
- Western Sahara War
- Mohamed Ali El Admi

== Notes ==
Political offices
Preceded by None, inaugural holder	President of the Sahrawi Republic; 1976	Succeeded by Mahfoud Ali Beiba
