= Mohamed Ali El Admi =

Moroccan politician

Mohamed Ali El Admi alias Omar Hadrami
- Born: 1949 (age 76–77) east of Smara
- Occupation: civil servant
- Known for: Founder and Military leader in the Polisario Front

Mohamed Ali El Admi (Arabic: محمد علي العظمي; born Mohamed Ali Ould el Wali and commonly known by his nom de guerre Omar Hadrami) is a Sahrawi politician and ex-senior member of the Polisario Front, which he co-founded.

El Admi joined Morocco in 1989 and settled in Rabat. He has been accused of many human rights violations including alleged war crimes, torture of Moroccan prisoners of war and Sahrawi dissidents in the refugee camps.

In January 2014, Mohammed VI appointed him as the Wali (governor) of the Guelmim-Es Semara region.

== Positions in Morocco ==
- Governor of Kelaat Sraghna 25 January 1995 – 27 September 1998
- Governor of Sidi Kacem 27 September 1998 – 11 January 2002
- Wali of Chaouia-Ouardigha 11 January 2002 – 20 January 2007

== See also ==
- Former members of the Polisario Front
