= Ya Bani al-Sahra' =

National anthem of the Sahrawi Arab Democratic Republic

Yā Banī al-Ṣaḥrāʼ
English: O Sons of the Sahara
- يا بني الصحراء
- National anthem of the Sahrawi Republic
- Adopted: 1979
- Preceded by: Marcha Real

Audio sample
- MIDI instrumental rendition in F major: file; help

"Yā Banī al-Ṣaḥrāʼ" (Arabic: يا بني الصحراء, romanized: Yā Banī al-Ṣaḥrāʼ, lit. 'O Sons of the Sahara'; Spanish: ¡Oh, hijos del Sáhara!) is the national anthem of the Sahrawi Arab Democratic Republic (SADR) of Western Sahara. In 1979, the song became the SADR's national anthem.

== Lyrics ==
Arabic original

كورال:
𝄆 يا بني الصحراء 𝄇
𝄆 يا بني الصحراء 𝄇
انتم في الوغى حاملي المشعل
في الدرب الطويل اصنعوا الثورة
في أمتنا
واسلكوا من أجلها هذا السبيل
𝄆 اقطعوا رأس الدخيل 𝄇

١
أيها الثوار يا مجد الوطن
اقطعوا الاقطاع في هذي الربوع
وانزعو بالحرب أسباب الفتن
ورفضوها لا خضوع لا خنوع
𝄆 لا عميل لا دخيل 𝄇

٢
أيها السائل عنا إننا
من تحدى في الجهاد المستحيل
نحن من حطم ذاك الوثنا
نحن من لقنه الدرس الجليل
𝄆 إننا شعب نبيل 𝄇

٣
نحن من أعلناها ضد الغزاة
ثورة تحرق كل الغاصبين
إنها الحرب التي تمحو الطغات
وتقر الحق حق الكادحين
𝄆 إننا شعب نبيل 𝄇

٤
إنها الثورة من أجل الشعوب
وستمضي في البلاد العربية
تصنع الوحدة دوما في القلوب
وتقيم العدل والديمقراطية
𝄆 كل قرن كل جيل 𝄇

Transliteration

kūrāl:
𝄆 yā banī ṣ-ṣaḥrāʾ 𝄇
𝄆 yā banī ṣ-ṣaḥrāʾ 𝄇
ʾantum fī l-waḡā ḥāmilī l-mašʿal
fī d-darbi ṭ-ṭawīli ṣnaʿū ṯ-ṯawra
fī ʾummatinā
waslukū min ʾajlihā hāḏā s-sabīl
𝄆 iqṭaʿū raʾsa d-daḵīl 𝄇

1
ʾayyuhā ṯ-ṯuwwāru yā majda l-waṭan
iqṭaʿū l-iqṭāʿa fī hāḏī r-rubūʿ
wanzaʿū bi-l-ḥarbi ʾasbāba l-fitan
warfuḍūhā lā ḵuḍūʿu lā ḵunūʿ
𝄆 lā ʿamīlu lā daḵīl 𝄇

2
ʾayyuhā s-sāʾilu ʿannā ʾinnanā
man taḥaddā fī l-jihādi l-mustaḥīl
naḥnu man ḥaṭṭama ḏāka l-waṯanā
naḥnu man laqqanahu d-darsa l-jalīl
𝄆 ʾinnanā šaʿbu nabīl 𝄇

3
naḥnu man ʾaʿlannāhā ḍidda l-ḡuzāẗ
ṯawrata taḥriqu kulla l-ḡāṣibīn
ʾinnahā l-ḥarbu allatī tamḥū ṭ-ṭuḡāt
watuqirru l-ḥaqqu ḥaqqa l-kādiḥīn
𝄆 ʾinnanā šaʿbu nabīl 𝄇

4
ʾinnahā ṯ-ṯawratu min ʾajli š-šuʿūb
wasatamḍī fī l-bilādi l-ʿarabiyya
taṣnaʿu l-wiḥdata dawmā fī l-qulūb
watuqīmu l-ʿadla wad-dīmuqrāṭiyya
𝄆 kulla qarni kulla jīl 𝄇

IPA transcription (MSA) (Note: See Help:IPA/Arabic.)

[kuː.raːl]
𝄆 /jaː ba.ni‿sˤ.sˤaħ.raːʔ/ 𝄇
𝄆 /jaː ba.ni‿sˤ.sˤaħ.raːʔ/ 𝄇
/ʔan.tum fi‿l.wa.ɣaː ħaː.mi.li‿l.maʃ.ʕal/
/fi‿d.dar.bi‿tˤ.tˤa.wiːli‿sˤ.na.ʕu‿θ.θaw.ra/
/fiː ʔum.ma.ti.naː/
/was.lu.kuː min ʔad͡ʒ.li.haː haː.ða‿s.sa.biːl/
𝄆 /iq.tˤa.ʕuː raʔ.sa‿d.da.xiːl/ 𝄇

1
/ʔaj.ju.ha‿θ.θuw.waː.ru jaː mad͡ʒ.da‿l.wa.tˤan/
/iq.tˤa.ʕuː l.iq.tˤaːʕa fiː haː.ði‿r.ru.buːʕ/
/wan.za.ʕuː bil.ħar.bi ʔas.baː.ba‿l.fi.tan/
/war.fu.dˤuː.haː laː xu.dˤuːʕu laː xu.nuːʕ/
𝄆 /laː ʕa.miː.lu laː da.xiːl/ 𝄇

2
/ʔaj.ju.ha‿s.saː.ʔi.lu ʕan.naː ʔin.na.naː/
/man ta.ħad.daː fi‿l.d͡ʒi.haː.di‿l.mus.ta.ħiːl/
/naħ.nu man ħatˤ.tˤa.ma ðaː.ka‿l.wa.θa.naː/
/naħ.nu man laq.qa.na.hu‿d.dar.sa‿l.d͡ʒa.liːl/
𝄆 /ʔin.na.naː ʃaʕ.bu na.biːl/ 𝄇

3
/naħ.nu man ʔaʕ.lan.naː.haː dˤid.da‿l.ɣu.zaːt/
/θaw.ra.ta taħ.ri.qu kul.la‿l.ɣaː.sˤi.biːn/
/ʔin.na.ha‿l.ħar.bu‿l.la.tiː tam.ħu‿tˤ.tˤu.ɣaːt/
/wa.tu.qir.ru‿l.ħaq.qa ħaq.qa‿l.kaː.di.ħiːn/
𝄆 /ʔin.na.naː ʃaʕ.bu na.biːl/ 𝄇

4
/ʔin.na.ha‿θ.θaw.ra.tu min ʔad͡ʒ.li‿ʃ.ʃu.ʕuːb/
/wa.sa.tam.dˤiː fi‿l.bi.laː.di‿l.ʕa.ra.bij.ja/
/tasˤ.na.ʕu‿l.wiħ.da.ta daw.maː fi‿l.qu.luːb/
/wa.tu.qiː.mu‿l.ʕad.la wad.diː.muq.raː.tˤij.ja/
𝄆 /kul.la qar.ni kul.la d͡ʒiːl/ 𝄇

Spanish translation

Coro:
𝄆 ¡O hijos del Sáhara! 𝄇
𝄆 ¡O hijos del Sáhara! 𝄇
En el campo de batalla, ustedes son titulares de antorcha
En el camino largo haga la revolución
En nuestra nación
Y siga este camino por ella.
𝄆 Corte la cabeza del invasor. 𝄇

I
O revolucionarios, la patria será gloriosa.
Corte los estados en esta región.
Quite con la guerra las causas para la protesta
Y abandónelo; ninguna sumisión, ningún ceder.
𝄆 Ningún agente, ningún invasor 𝄇

II
Usted que pregunta sobre nosotros:
Somos estos que conducen la lucha de transformación.
Somos estos que rompen a aquel ídolo,
Somos estos que entienden la lección hermosa.
𝄆 Somos la gente del camino. 𝄇

III
Somos estos que revelaron el camino contra la incursión,
El que que quema encima de a los asaltantes.
Esto es la guerra para borrar al opresor
Y establecer el derecho de los trabajadores.
𝄆 Somos la gente del camino. 𝄇

IV
El levantamiento es para la gente
Y avanzará en las tierras árabes.
Esto producirá la unidad siempre en los corazones
Y establecerá la justicia y la democracia.
𝄆 Cada siglo, cada generación. 𝄇

English translation

Chorus:
𝄆 O sons of the Sahara! 𝄇
𝄆 O sons of the Sahara! 𝄇
In the battlefield, you are torchbearers
In the long road, make revolution
In our nation
And follow this path for her sake.
𝄆 Cut off the head of the invader. 𝄇

I
O revolutionaries, the homeland will be glorious.
Cut off the estates in this region.
Remove in war the causes for protest
And abandon it; no submission, no yielding.
𝄆 No agent, no invader. 𝄇

II
You who ask about us:
We are the ones who drive the transforming struggle.
We are the ones who smash that idol,
We are the ones who understand the beautiful lesson.
𝄆 We are the people of the path. 𝄇

III
We are the ones who revealed the path against the raid,
The one that burns up the raiders.
It is the war to erase the oppressor
And establish the right of the laborers.
𝄆 We are the people of the path 𝄇

IV
The uprising is for the people
And will advance in the Arab lands.
It will produce unity forever in the hearts
And will establish justice and democracy.
𝄆 Every century, every generation. 𝄇
