= Former members of the Polisario Front =

Since the end of the 1980s, several members of POLISARIO have decided to discontinue their military or political activities for the Polisario Front. Most of them returned from the Sahrawi refugee camps in Algeria to Morocco, among them a few founder members and senior officials. Some of them are now actively promoting Moroccan sovereignty over Western Sahara, which Morocco considers its Southern Provinces. Their individual reasons to stop working for POLISARIO, as reported in the media, vary, but include allegations of human rights violations, monopolization and abuse of power, blackmailing and isolating the refugee population in Tindouf, and misuse of foreign aid. They also claim POLISARIO is controlled by the government of Algeria and as one former member of POLISARIO put it, "[was] a group of Moroccan students who were urging the Spanish colonizer to leave and who had never claimed independence or the separation from motherland Morocco."

The following is a list of some former members of the POLISARIO. It is not complete.

- Ahmedou Souelem Ahmed Brahim, former "minister", responsible of relations with the Arab World
- Omar Hadrami – responsible of the military security of POLISARIO, a relative of the late Ma al-'Aynayn
- Lahbib Ayoub - co-founder of the POLISARIO, military commander
- Lebnaha Attaya – Close to Prime Minister of the Sahrawi Arab Democratic Republic, Mahfoud Ali Beiba
- Ghaoutah Mohamed Ahmed Baba – census official
- Mustapha El Barazani – founder member and representative at the Organisation of African Unity
- Mustapha Bouh – Political Commissar for Sahrawi Popular Army of Liberation.
- Bachir Dkhill – Founding member of the POLISARIO, representative of the organization in several countries and organizations.
- Guajmoula Bent Ebbi – member of the Politburo, and today Moroccan MP.
- Sidati Mohamed Abdellahi alias Sidati El Ghallaoui – representative of the POLISARIO in Italy and Malta.
- Mohamed Abdelkader Ould Mohamed Oul Habiboullah Ould Haibelti – Held several top positions before heading the Sahrawi Republic-radio
- Brahim Hakim – Former foreign minister of the RASD and representative of the POLISARIO in North America.
- Maâlainine Mohamed Khaled – POLISARIO observer at MINURSO in Mauritania (5-7-2005)
- Boullahi El Khalifa – Director of POLISARIO radio broadcasting
- Mohamed Salem Khatri
- Keltoum Khayati – Formerly in charge of the organization of women.
- Ayoub Lahbib – Founder member of the POLISARIO and member of the Executive Committee.
- Abderrahmane Leibek – POLISARIO member
- Mohamed Ahmed ben Omar Ouled M'Brirek – POLISARIO representative for the identification of Sahrawis
- Ahmed Moulay M’Hamed – Head of the Security Services
- Lfdal Malainine – director at the Education Ministry
- Ghoulam Najem Mouichane – representative in Germany
- Ahmed Ould Mohamed Abderrahman Cheikh Abdelaziz Rabani
- Hametti Rabani – Minister for Justice and Cults
- Mohamed Abdellahi Ould Mohamed El Mostapha Rabani – Lawyer
- El Haj Abdellah Ould Abdelkader Ould Rabani – Journalist
- Merrebih Rebbou
- Ahmed Ould Saleh – personal secretary of Ayoub Lahbib
- Bouchaâb Yahdih – representative of POLISARIO in France
- Cheikh Ali El Bouhali Hnini
- Daifallah Yahdih – former census official
- Cheikh El Mahjoub Ould M'Hamed Salem Ould Erraha – former census official
- Semlali Aabadilah – former politician of Polisario
- Hach Ahmed Baricalla – ambassador and minister
- Yanja El Khattat – mathematics tutor
- Jadiyetu Mohamud – translator

The reports of the experiences of the former members of POLISARIO have generally been published in Moroccan newspapers supporting the government position on Western Sahara. The possibility to freely report on the problem of Western Sahara is limited in Morocco (see: International Press Institute, World Press Freedom Review, 2005 Morocco).

US Congressman Donald M. Payne, from New Jersey, referred in 2005 to some former members of POLISARIO during a hearing before the subcommittee on Africa: "Also several people who were in a position of authority in the POLISARIO camps, when serious human rights abuses including torture were widespread, particularly during the late 1970s and throughout the 1980s, now occupy positions of authority in the Moroccan civil administration. This is based on information Amnesty International has been privy to."
