= Flag of Western Sahara =

Sahrawi Arab Democratic Republic
- علم البوليساريو; Bandera del Polisario ('Flag of Polisario')
- Use: National flag
- Proportion: 1:2
- Adopted: 27 February 1976; 50 years ago
- Design: A black, white, and green horizontal tricolour charged with a red star and crescent in the centre stripe and a red triangle at the hoist
- Designed by: El Uali Mustafá Sayed

The national flag of Western Sahara or the flag of the Sahrawi Arab Democratic Republic uses a national flag consisting of a black, white and green horizontal tricolor charged with a red star and crescent in the center stripe and a red triangle at the hoist. It is used on SADR-controlled areas, while the Moroccan flag is used on the occupied parts of Western Sahara.

The flag is a combination of the Pan-Arab colors of black, green, white, and red, and the Islamic symbol of the star and crescent. On 27 February 1976 the flag was adopted as the official flag of the Sahrawi Arab Democratic Republic (SADR). It is said to have been designed by El Uali Mustafá Sayed, the first president of the SADR.

== Description ==
The flag is a tricolor of three equal horizontal stripes (black, white, and green from top to bottom) overlaid by a red triangle issuing from the hoist. These are the Pan-Arab colors. There is a red star and crescent in the middle stripe.

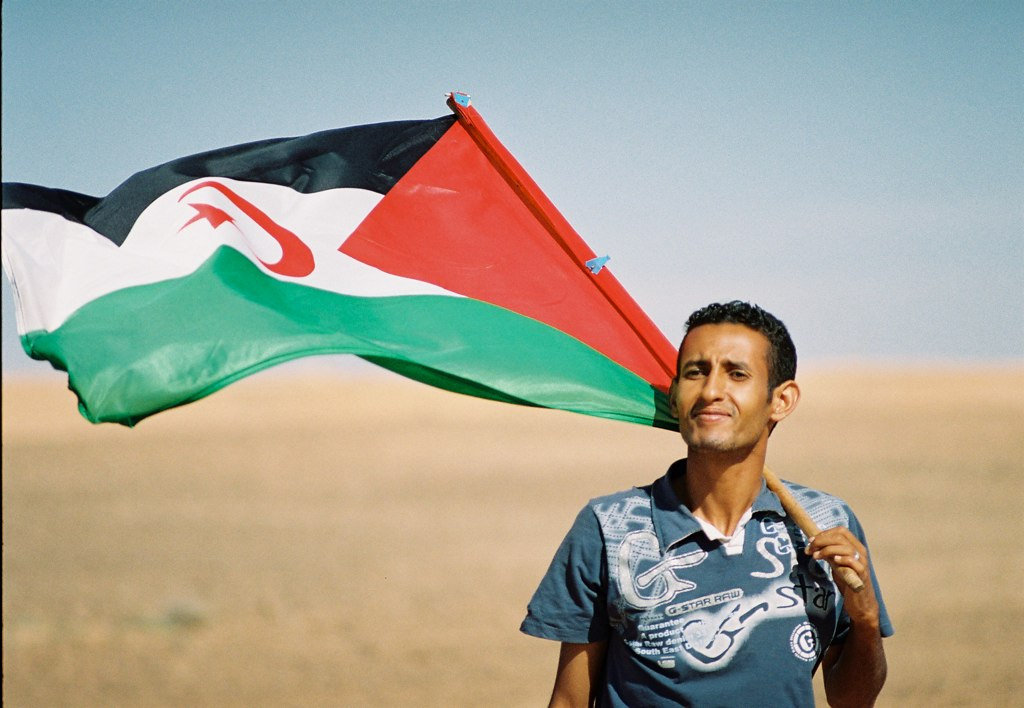
Man carrying the flag of Western Sahara, 2011.

The flag is similar to the flags of the Ba'ath Party, Jordan, Palestine, the Kingdom of Iraq, and the Arab Federation all of which draw their inspiration from the Arab Revolt against Ottoman rule (1916–1918). Prior to being the flag of Palestine, it was the flag of the short-lived Arab Federation of Iraq and Jordan. The flag of the Arab Revolt had the same graphic form, but the colors were arranged differently (white on the bottom, rather than in the middle).

Its design is based on that of the Palestinian flag, which in turn was derived from the colors used in the Arab Revolt. The star and crescent are considered symbols of Islam, and can be seen on flags of other neighboring Muslim-majority countries such as Algeria and Mauritania.

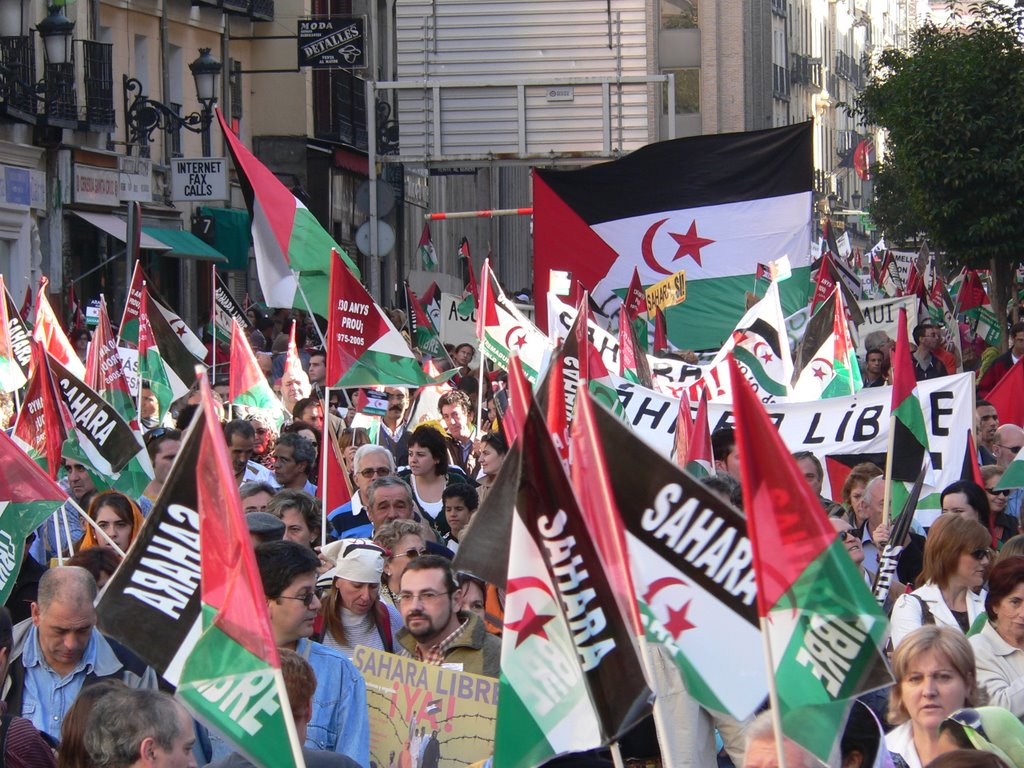
Western Sahara flags at a protest in Madrid, 2006.

=== Symbolism ===
The green of the flag represents the Sahrawi people's hope of one day returning to their lands and the white represents peace and the purity of the Sahrawi, while the black represents anguish and grief for the martyrs and the red represents the blood spilled by all the martyrs. The star represents the SADR being an Arab republic, while the crescent represents the Sahrawi Republic being a Muslim country.

== History ==
In the late 19th-century Western Sahara became a Spanish colony.

During the Spanish province of Sahara, the only official flag was the flag of Spain, however, the maritime province of Villa Cisneros, which corresponds to the current territory of Western Sahara, was assigned a cornet flag that consisted of two stripes, blue the upper and yellow the lower.

Like other demarcations of Spain, such as Cantabria, which created their symbols taking as references the flags of their maritime provinces, the Saharawi National Union Party created its flag based on that of the Maritime Province of Villa Cisneros, until its entry into the Polisario Front in a meeting held on October 12, 1975, with the leadership of said movement.

After the Madrid Accords of 1975, Spain disengaged itself leaving the territory to Morocco and Mauritania, who split the territory, giving two-thirds to the former. The Polisario Front rejected this and declared in exile, the Sahrawi Arab Democratic Republic (SADR) as the state representing an "independent" Western Sahara.

In 1979, Mauritania signed a Peace Treaty with the Polisario Front, and Morocco annexed the part formerly controlled by Mauritania.

An U.N.-brokered ceasefire was signed in 1991 between the two parties, but the sovereignty of the territory remains unresolved pending ongoing peace-talks.

=== Historical flags ===
Flag of Spain under Franco (1936–1938; Spanish Civil War, 1936–1939)

Flag of Spain under Franco (1938–1945; Spanish Civil War, 1936–1939)

Flag of Spain under Franco (1945–1975) and Juan Carlos I (1975–1977)

Flag of the Maritime Province of Villa Cisneros (1946–1975)

Flag of the Sahrawi National Union Party (1974–1975)

The flag of Mauritania was the official flag of Tiris al-Gharbiyya, the part of Western Sahara annexed by Mauritania (1976–1979)

==== Moroccan regional flags (1976–1997) ====
In the 1976–1997 provincial division of Morocco, three provinces included parts of Western Sahara. The provinces were, however, reorganized in 1997. Consequently, some of these flags are no longer in official use.

Flag of Laayoune province.

Flag of Boujdour province.

Flag of Dakhla province.

== Unicode ==
The flag of Western Sahara is represented as the Unicode emoji sequence U+1F1EA 🇪 REGIONAL INDICATOR SYMBOL LETTER E and U+1F1ED 🇭 REGIONAL INDICATOR SYMBOL LETTER H, making "🇪🇭".

== See also ==
- Flag of Morocco
- Flag of Mauritania
- Flag of Palestine
- Flag of Jordan
- Coat of arms of Western Sahara
- Gallery of flags with crescents
