= Coat of arms of Western Sahara =

Coat of arms of the Sahrawi Arab Democratic Republic
- Armiger: Sahrawi Arab Democratic Republic
- Adopted: 1976
- Crest: Star and crescent Gules
- Supporters: Two olive branches Or
- Motto: Arabic: حرية ديمقراطية وحدة "Liberty, Democracy, Unity"
- Other elements: Two crossed rifles with Sahrawi Arab Democratic Republic flags hanging from each

The coat of arms of the Sahrawi Arab Democratic Republic is a symbol created by the Polisario Front, the national liberation movement of Western Sahara. The Polisario Front proclaimed the Sahrawi Arab Democratic Republic on February 27, 1976, and both the flag and the coat of arms were adopted as state symbols.

The territory of Western Sahara is a disputed territory, claimed by:

- Morocco, which controls and administers about 80% of the territory. Currently, the coats of arms of the Moroccan regions of Western Sahara are used in this part of Western Sahara.
- The Polisario Front and the government-in-exile of the Sahrawi Arab Democratic Republic or SADR claim the independence of the territory. The coat of arms of the Sahrawi Arab Democratic Republic are used by these two bodies.

== Description ==
The symbol depicts two crossed rifles with the SADR flag hanging from either Mauser. Centered above them is a red crescent and star, Islamic and Arabic imagery. Surrounding the guns and crescent are two olive branches, one on either side. At the bottom is written in Arabic the Polisario motto "حرية ديمقراطية وحدة" (English: "Liberty, democracy, unity") in black on a red banner. Until June 1991 when it was modified, it also contained a hammer between the rifles.

== History ==
Coat of arms 1976–1991 with hammer

In the late 19th-century, Western Sahara formally became a Spanish colony. After the Green March pressure and the Madrid Accords of 1975, Spain unilaterally disengaged itself leaving the territory to Morocco and Mauritania, who split the territory, giving two thirds to the former, in a movement that was not recognized by the UN. The Polisario Front rejected this illegal move and declared in Bir Lehlou, the Sahrawi Arab Democratic Republic (SADR) as the state representing an independent Western Sahara.

In 1979, Mauritania signed a peace treaty with the Polisario front, and Morocco annexed the part formerly controlled by Mauritania. A U.N.-brokered ceasefire was signed in 1991 between the two parties, but the sovereignty of the territory remains unresolved pending ongoing peace-talks.

=== Coat of arms of Spanish Sahara ===
Coat of arms of Spanish Sahara

The coat of arms of Laâyoune or El Aaiún was used for the Spanish colony of Spanish Sahara. It was granted by the Spanish Government (Presidencia del Gobierno). The Order of 25 October 1955 was published in the Boletín Oficial del Estado Nr. 334 on 30th of November 1955. Its blason is: De sinople o verde: la banda ondeada, representando el agua, de plata y azur; en jefe, la palmera, de su color; y, en punta, la cabeza de camello arábigo, al natural. Bordura, de gules, cuatro castillos de oro, mazonados, alternando con cuatro leones de plata. That is: Vert a bend wawy Argent and Azure (alternatively: „charged with three bendlets wawy Azure“), representing water, in chief a palm tree and in base a natural head of a Arabian camel. A bordure Gules with four castles Or and three lions rampant Argent.

=== Emblem of MINURSO ===
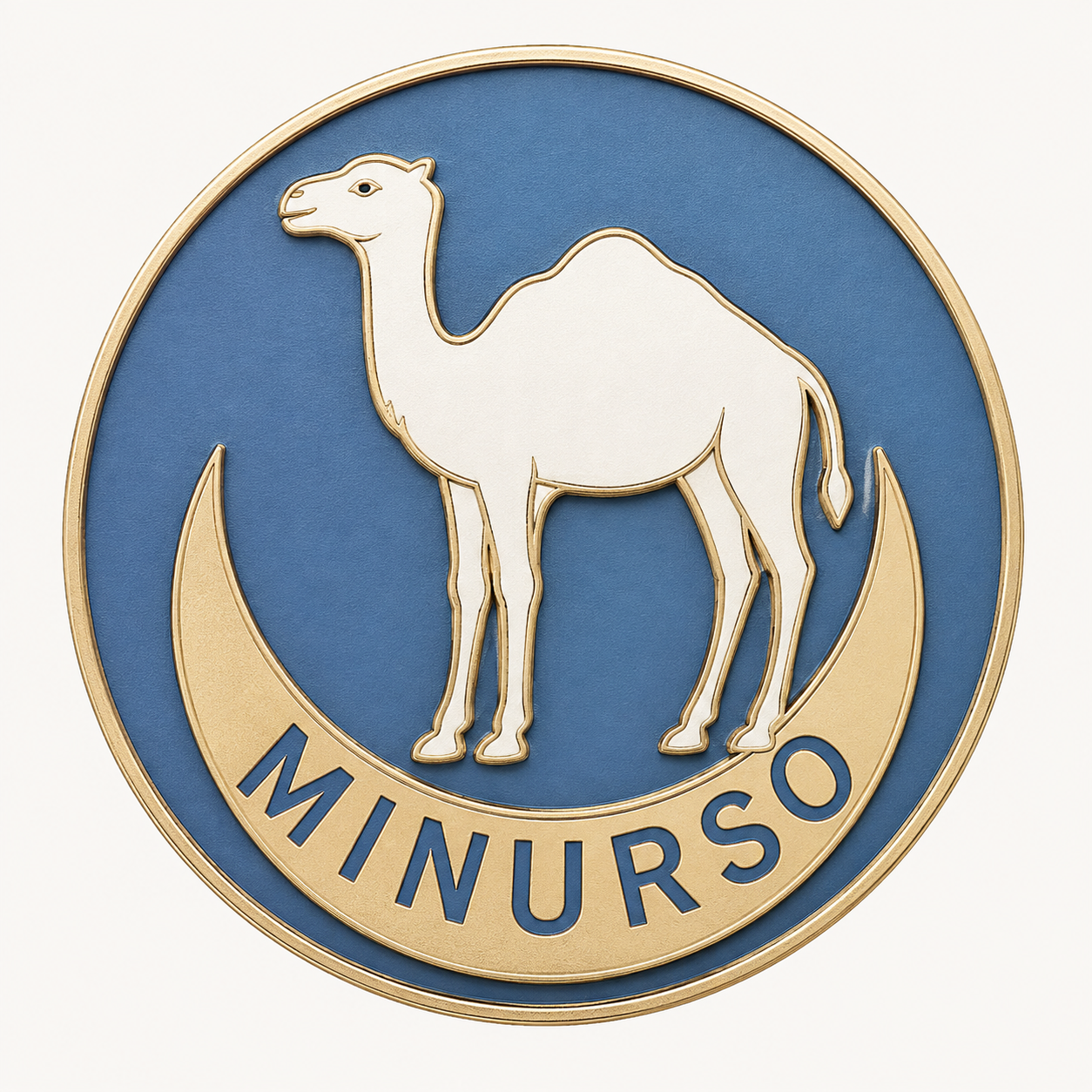
Emblem of MINURSO

The unofficial emblem of the MINURSO includes a design of a white camel standing on a crescent-shaped base, which contains the letters 'MINURSO', in blue.
