= .eh =

Internet Country code top-level domain (ccTLD) for Western Sahara

- Introduced: Not officially assigned
- TLD type: Country code top-level domain
- Status: Unassigned
- Registry: None
- Sponsor: None
- Intended use: Entities connected with Western Sahara
- Actual use: Not available for use
- Registration restrictions: Not available for registration

Western Sahara is a disputed territory, and as such it has no country code top-level domain (ccTLD). .eh is reserved for this purpose, and will be assigned if the Western Sahara conflict results in an agreement between the Sahrawi Arab Democratic Republic and Morocco. IANA has not designated a ccTLD manager for the .eh domain.

== History ==
The letters .eh correspond to "Sáhara Español" (ESH, as Western Sahara was previously called Spanish Sahara) and also match Saguia el-Hamra, one of two provinces in the earlier Spanish Sahara.

On August 1, 2007, an international consortium made a bid to IANA to administer the .eh domain on behalf of the Sahrawi Arab Democratic Republic. Morocco, which controls most of Western Sahara, has made competing claims to the domain.

On October 16, 2007, ICANN decided not to delegate .eh at all, with the explanation that:

there are currently two applicants for the delegation of the country code top-level domain (ccTLD) .EH (Western Sahara). Both requests meet the technical criteria for managing a top-level domain. In cases like this, IANA has a long-standing policy of requesting that the two contesting applicants work together to find a mutual solution that will serve the needs of the local Internet community in the best possible fashion. ICANN does not see a way to approve the .EH ccTLD delegation to one of the applicants without violating its long-standing policy unless the contesting parties are able to reach an agreement.

The two applicants remain armed belligerents; no such agreement has been reached and the domain remains inactive.

== Publicity ==
On April 1, 2013 the Canadian Internet Registration Authority announced it would be releasing .eh domain names to consumers as part of an April Fools' Day joke, the TLD being a play on the interjection "eh", which is stereotypically associated with Canadians and Canada.
