= Sahrawi peseta =

Currency in Western Sahara

البيزيتا الصحراوي (Arabic); Peseta saharaui (Spanish)

ISO 4217
- Code: None (EHP is used in commerce)

Unit
- Symbol: ₧ (rare, see Spanish peseta); Ptas.

Denominations
- Subunit
- 1/100: céntimo
- Coins: 1, 2, 5, 25, 50, 100, 500, 1000 pesetas

Demographics
- User(s): (Western Sahara) Sahrawi Arab Democratic Republic

Issuance
- Central bank: Polisario Front

Valuation
- Pegged with: Euro (166.386 pesetas = €1)

The Sahrawi peseta (Arabic: البيزيتا الصحراوي, Spanish: Peseta saharaui) is the de jure currency of the Sahrawi Arab Democratic Republic. It is divided into 100 céntimos, although coins with this denomination have never been minted, nor have banknotes been printed.

The first Sahrawi pesetas were minted in 1990, but they were not adopted as the national coin of Western Sahara until 1997. One site considers them to be "Fantasy coins", and alleges that the 1 Peseta coin was minted using a Cuban 1 Centavo planchet. As this territory is mostly controlled by Morocco, the circulating currency in that part of the country is the Moroccan dirham, with Algerian dinars and Mauritanian ouguiyas circulating alongside the Sahrawi peseta in the Sahrawi refugee camps and the SADR-controlled part of Western Sahara.

As it is not an official currency and not circulating, the exchange rate is not realistic. Despite this, the Sahrawi peseta was pegged at par to the Spanish peseta and, when the latter was phased out for the euro, the rate became €1 for 166.386 Pts.

== Coins ==
Non-commemorative coins are supposedly designated for circulation. They are made from cupronickel. The denominations are: 1, 2, 5, 10, 50, 100, 200 and 500 pesetas.

Denomination	Year	Metal	Diameter (mm.)	Weight (gr.)	Obverse	Reverse	Image
1 Peseta	1992	Cu+Ni	17.00	2.99	Bedouin and dromedary TRANSPORTE TIPICO النقل التقليدي	Value Coat of Arms REPUBLICA ARABE SAHARAUI DEMOCRATICA	
2 Pesetas	1992	Cu+Ni	20.00	3.51	Bedouin and dromedary TRANSPORTE TIPICO النقل التقليدي	Value Coat of Arms REPUBLICA ARABE SAHARAUI DEMOCRATICA	
5 Pesetas	1992	Cu+Ni	21.00		Bedouin and dromedary TRANSPORTE TIPICO النقل التقليدي	Value Coat of Arms REPUBLICA ARABE SAHARAUI DEMOCRATICA	
50 Pesetas	1990	Cu+Ni	24.40	6.4	Bedouin and dromedary TRANSPORTE TIPICO النقل التقليدي	Value Coat of Arms REPUBLICA ARABE SAHARAUI DEMOCRATICA	

There have also been commemorative issues in copper, silver and gold, as some of those shown here:

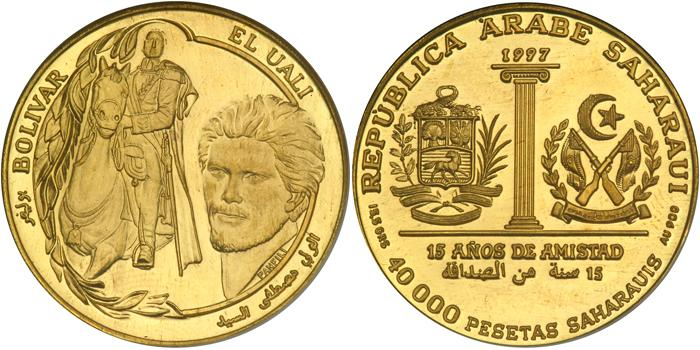
Gold 40,000 pesetas. 15th Anniversary of diplomatic relations with Venezuela (1997)

== See also ==
- Algerian dinar
- Mauritanian ouguiya
- Moroccan dirham
- Spanish peseta
