= Sahrawi Arab Democratic Republic =

Partially recognised state in North Africa

(in official languages)
Arabic	الجمهورية العربية الصحراوية الديمقراطية al-Jumhūriyyah al-‘Arabiyyah aṣ-Ṣaḥrāwiyyah ad-Dīmuqrāṭiyyah
Spanish	República Árabe Saharaui Democrática
- Flag Coat of arms
- Motto: حرية، ديمقراطية، وحدة (Arabic); Libertad, Democracia, Unidad (Spanish) "Freedom, Democracy, Unity"
- Anthem: يا بني الصحراء (Arabic); Yā Banī aṣ-Ṣaḥrāʾ ¡Oh, hijos del Sahara! (Spanish) "Oh, Sons of the Sahara!"
- Status: State with limited recognition, government-in-exile
- Capital and largest city: Laayoune (de jure); 27°9′N 13°12′W
- Capital-in-exile: Tifariti (declared temporary capital); Rabuni, Tindouf (de facto)
- Official languages: Arabic; Spanish (Note: It is described as the SADR's second official language)
- Spoken languages: Hassaniya Arabic; Saharan Spanish
- Religion: Islam (official)
- Demonyms: Sahrawi; Saharawi; Western Saharan
- Government: Unitary one-party semi-presidential republic
  - President: Brahim Ghali
  - Prime Minister: Bouchraya Hammoudi Bayoun
- Legislature: National Council

Formation
  - Relinquished by Spain: 14 November 1975
  - Republic declared: 27 February 1976
  - Sovereignty disputed with Morocco: Ongoing

Area
  - Total: 266,000 km^{2} (103,000 sq mi) (claimed); 90,000 km^{2} (35,000 sq mi) (controlled) (77th)
  - Water (%): Negligible

Population
  - Estimate: c. 200,000
  - Refugee camps: 173,600 (2023 estimate)
  - Liberated Territories: 40,000 (2010 estimate) (Note: Most of the civilian population has been relocated to the Sahrawi refugee camps in Tindouf after the outbreak of the Second Western Sahara War.)
- HDI (2015): 0.500 low
- Currency: Sahrawi peseta (de jure) (EHP) De facto: Moroccan dirham (MAD) (Note: In the Moroccan-occupied territories.); Algerian dinar (DZD); Mauritanian ouguiya (MRU); Euro (EUR) (Note: The euro is informally accepted in the Sahrawi refugee camps.)
- Time zone: UTC+0 (GMT)
- ISO 3166 code: EH
- Internet TLD: .eh (reserved)

The Sahrawi Arab Democratic Republic (SADR), (Note: /səˈrɑːwi/ sə-RAH-wee; SADR; also known as Saharawi Arab Democratic Republic; Arabic: الجمهورية العربية الصحراوية الديمقراطية, romanised: al-Jumhūriyyah al-ʿArabiyyah aṣ-Ṣaḥrāwiyyah ad-Dīmuqrāṭiyyah; Spanish: República Árabe Saharaui Democrática, [reˈpuβlik(a) ˈaɾaβe sa(χa)ˈɾawi ðemoˈkɾatika]) also known as the Sahrawi Republic, is a partially recognised state in the western Maghreb that claims sovereignty over the entire non-self-governing territory of Western Sahara, but controls only the easternmost portion of that territory.

Its claimed capital city is Laayoune, which is also the largest city in Western Sahara. Since the SADR does not control Laayoune, it has established a temporary capital in Tifariti, although most of the day-to-day administration happens in Rabuni, one of the Sahrawi refugee camps located in Tindouf, Algeria.

The SADR was proclaimed by the Polisario Front on 27 February 1976, in Bir Lehlou, Western Sahara. The SADR government calls the territories under its control the Liberated Territories or the Free Zone. Morocco occupies the rest of the disputed territory, and calls these lands its Southern Provinces. The SADR is a full member of the African Union, but is not a member of the Arab League, nor of the Arab Maghreb Union. It is one of only two African states in which the Spanish language is a significant language, the other being Equatorial Guinea.

== Etymology ==
The name Sahrawi is the romanisation of the Arabic word Ṣaḥrāwī صحراوي, meaning 'Inhabitant of the Desert', derived from the Arabic word Ṣaḥrāʼ (صحراء), meaning 'desert'.

== History ==
The territory of Western Sahara, inhabited predominantly by nomadic Sahrawi people, had been a Spanish possession since the late 19th century.

The Polisario Front was formally constituted in 1973 and immediately launched an armed revolution against the Spanish occupation. This, along with pressure from the United Nations General Assembly, forced the Spanish to announce an independence referendum. In 1975, the Spanish government was preparing to abandon the territory as part of its decolonisation of Africa. In early November 1975, the Green March (a political demonstration coordinated by the Moroccan government) led Spain, Morocco, and Mauritania to sign the Madrid Accords on 14 November 1975. Under the treaty, Spain agreed to relinquish administrative responsibility for Spanish Sahara, to be divided between Morocco and Mauritania, with no role for either the Polisario Front or the Sahrawi people.

By 12 January 1976, Spain had withdrawn all of its military forces from Western Sahara, and Moroccan and Mauritanian forces immediately occupied the territory. Neither Morocco nor Mauritania gained international recognition, and war ensued with the independence-seeking Polisario Front. The UN considers the Polisario Front to be the legitimate representative of the Sahrawi people, and maintains that the people of Western Sahara have a right to "self-determination and independence".

The creation of the Sahrawi Arab Democratic Republic was proclaimed on 27 February 1976, as the Polisario Front declared the need for a new entity to fill what they considered a political void left by the departing Spanish colonial administration. While the claimed capital is the former Western Sahara capital Laayoune (which is in Moroccan-occupied territory), the proclamation was made in the government-in-exile's provisional capital, Bir Lehlou, which remained in Polisario-held territory under the 1991 ceasefire (see Settlement Plan). On 27 February 2008, the provisional capital was formally moved to Tifariti. Day-to-day business, however, is conducted in the Sahrawi refugee camps in Tindouf Province, Algeria, which house most of the Sahrawi exile community.

== Government and politics ==
The Sahrawi Arab Democratic Republic is officially a one-party semi-presidential republic.

Since August 1982, the highest office of the republic has been the President of the Sahrawi Arab Democratic Republic, a post held by the secretary-general of the Polisario Front, presently Brahim Ghali, who appoints the Prime Minister, currently Bouchraya Hammoudi Bayoun. The SADR's government structure consists of a Council of Ministers (a cabinet led by the Prime Minister), a judicial branch (with judges appointed by the President) and the parliamentary Sahrawi National Council (SNC; the present speaker is Bashir Mustafa Sayed). Since its inception in 1976, the various constitutional revisions have transformed the republic from an ad hoc managerial structure into something approaching a governing apparatus. From the late 1980s the parliament began to take steps to institute a division of powers and to disentangle the republic's structures from those of the Polisario Front, although without clear effect to date.

Its various ministries are responsible for a variety of services and functions. The judiciary, complete with trial courts, appeals courts and a supreme court, operates in the same areas. As a government-in-exile, many branches of government do not fully function, and has affected the constitutional roles of the institutions. Institutions parallel to government structures also have arisen within the Polisario Front, which is fused with the SADR's governing apparatus, and with operational competences overlapping between these party and governmental institutions and offices. A 2012 report mentioned the existence of the Sahrawi Bar Association. In 2016, the bar association (going by the name Union of Sahrawi Lawyers) issued a report calling for the implementation of political and civil rights. Unfortunately, there is no clear indication as to how certain demographic groups, such as women, have fared in the legal field.

The SNC is weak in its legislative role, having been instituted as a mainly consultative and consensus-building institution, but it has strengthened its theoretical legislative and controlling powers during later constitutional revisions. Among other things, it has added a ban on capital punishment to the constitution, and brought down the government in 1999 through a vote of no-confidence.

The Sahrawi National Council is composed of 53 members, all from the Polisario Front.

=== Constitution ===
A 1999 Constitution of the Sahrawi Arab Democratic Republic took a form similar to the parliamentary constitutions of many European states, but with some paragraphs suspended until the achievement of "full independence". Among key points, the head of state is constitutionally the Secretary General of the Polisario Front during what is referred to as the "pre-independence phase", with provision in the constitution that on independence, Polisario is supposed to be dismantled or separated completely from the government structure. Provisions are detailed for a transitory phase beginning with independence, in which the present SADR is supposed to act as Western Sahara's government, ending with a constitutional reform and eventual establishment of a state along the lines specified in the constitution.

The broad guidelines laid down in the constitution for an eventual Western Saharan state include eventual multi-party democracy with a market economy. The constitution also defines Sahrawis as a Muslim, African and Arab people. The Constitution also declares a commitment to the principles of human rights and to the concept of a Greater Maghreb, as a regional variant of Pan-Arabism.

=== Military ===
The Sahrawi People's Liberation Army is the official military force of the Sahrawi Arab Democratic Republic and previously served as the armed wing of the Polisario Front prior to the foundation of the state.

=== International recognition and membership ===
As of September 2022, the Sahrawi Arab Democratic Republic has been recognised by 85 states, at one time or another. Of these, 39 have "frozen" or "withdrawn" recognition for a number of reasons. A total of 29 UN states maintain an embassy from the SADR, with Vietnam being the only nation not hosting an embassy but only sending their own mission. Sahrawi embassies exist in 18 states. Six UN states have other diplomatic relations, while a further nine UN nations and South Ossetia also recognise the state either by previous regimes or through international agreements in the past, but do not have any active relations at the moment (see foreign relations of the Sahrawi Arab Democratic Republic for more details).

Paraguay, Australia, Brazil, and Sweden have all internally voted to recognise the SADR, but none have yet ratified it.

Although it is not recognised by the UN, the SADR has held full membership of the African Union (AU, formerly the Organisation of African Unity, OAU) since 1982. Morocco withdrew from the OAU in protest during 1984, and from the time of South Africa's admittance to the OAU in 1994 was the only African UN member not also a member of the AU, until it was readmitted on 30 January 2017. The SADR participates as a guest in meetings of the Non-Aligned Movement and the New Asian–African Strategic Partnership, over Moroccan objections to SADR participation.

The SADR also participated in a conference of the Permanent Conference of Political Parties of the Latin American and the Caribbean (COPPPAL) in 2006; the SADR ambassador to Nicaragua participated in the opening conference of the Central American Parliament in 2010, and a SADR delegation participated in the meeting of COPPPAL and International Conference of Asian Political Parties in Mexico City in 2012.

On 27 February 2011, the 35th anniversary of the proclamation of SADR was marked in Tifariti, Western Sahara. Delegations, including parliamentarians, ambassadors, NGOs and activists from many countries participated in this event.

The SADR is not a member of the Arab League, nor of the Arab Maghreb Union, both of which include Morocco as a full member.

=== Area of authority ===
The Polisario Front governs the portion of Western Sahara east of Morocco’s fortified Moroccan Western Sahara wall, as well as the Sahrawi refugee camps around Tindouf Province in southwestern Algeria. It is headquartered in Camp Rabouni, south of Tindouf, although some official events have taken place in towns in the Free Zone, including the provisional capitals, first Bir Lehlou until 2008, then Tifariti. The government of the SADR claims sovereignty over all of the Western Sahara territory, but has control only within the Free Zone. Several foreign aid agencies, including the United Nations High Commissioner for Refugees and non-governmental organisations, are continually active in the camps.

=== Proposed Autonomy ===
==== Baker Plan (2000) ====
Under the Baker Plan created by James Baker, former UN Secretary-General Kofi Annan's personal envoy to Western Sahara, the SADR would have been replaced with a five-year transitional Western Sahara Authority (WSA), a non-sovereign autonomous region supervised by Morocco, to be followed by a referendum on independence. It was endorsed by the UN in 2003. As Morocco has declined to participate, however, the plan appears dead.

==== Western Sahara autonomy proposal ====
In April 2007, the government of Morocco suggested that a self-governing entity, through the Royal Advisory Council for Saharan Affairs (CORCAS), should govern the territory with some degree of autonomy for Western Sahara. The project was presented to the UN Security Council in mid-April 2007. A stalemate over the Moroccan proposal led the UN, in an April 2007 "Report of the UN Secretary-General", to ask the parties to enter into direct and unconditional negotiations to reach a mutually accepted political solution.

== Economy ==
The official currency of the SADR is the Sahrawi peseta, though, in practice, the Algerian dinar and Mauritanian ouguiya are the main currencies used within the controlled territories. The Moroccan dirham is also accepted, though it is mainly used only in the Moroccan-occupied territories.

== Demographics ==
=== Language ===
Modern Standard Arabic is the sole constitutionally recognised official and national language of the Sahrawi Republic. Hassaniya Arabic, a variety of Arabic also spoken in neighbouring countries such as Mauritania, is the common vernacular language of the Sahrawi people.

The Spanish language was introduced during the Spanish colonisation in the late 19th century, and remains as the preferred second language of the Sahrawi, also enjoying a de facto working language status. Instituto Cervantes estimates that around 20,000 Sahrawis have limited competencies in Saharan Spanish. In 2018, President Brahim Ghali stated that the SADR is the only Arab country in the world where Spanish is an official language.

=== Religion ===
Religion in Western Sahara (ARDA 2020 est.)
1. Islam (99.5%)
2. Christianity (0.15%)
3. Baháʼí (0.04%)
4. None (0.25%)

The predominant religion practiced by Sahrawis is the Maliki school of Sunni Islam, which is constitutionally recognised as the official religion of the SADR and a source of law. Virtually all Sahrawis identify as Muslim according to The World Factbook, which ranks the country among the most religiously homogeneous nations in the world.

The Catholic Church had an important presence during Spanish rule, with 20,000 Catholics (30% of the population) present before Spain abandoned the territory. Today around 300 people in the Moroccan-occupied areas are Catholic (mostly of Spanish origin). They can attend the St. Francis of Assisi Cathedral in Laayoune and the Our Lady of Mount Carmel Church in Dakhla.

== Culture ==
=== Sports ===
The SADR was invited to participate in the 2015 African Games in Brazzaville, which would have been the country's debut at a major international sporting event. However, its thirteen athletes were not allowed to compete by the Congolese organising committee. The country has a national football team, but its governing body, the Sahrawi Football Federation, is not a member of FIFA or the Confederation of African Football.

=== National holidays ===
Date	Name	Original event / Notes
27 February	Independence Day	Proclamation of the SADR in Bir Lehlou, 1976
8 March	First Martyr	
10 May	Foundation of the Polisario Front	The anniversary of the front's establishment in 1973
20 May	20 May Revolution	Start of the armed struggle against Spain in 1973
9 June	Day of the Martyrs	Day on which El-Ouali died in 1976
17 June	Zemla Intifada	Harakat Tahrir riots in El-Aaiun, 1970
12 October	Day of National Unity	Celebrating the commemoration anniversary of the Ain Ben Tili Conference, 1975

Additionally, Muslim celebrations are kept according to the lunar Islamic calendar.

Date	Name	Observance
Muharram 1	Islamic New Year	The anniversary of the Hijra from Mecca to Medina and the beginning of the lunar Islamic year
Dhu'l-Hijja 10	Eid al-Adha	Sacrifice feast
Shawwal 1	Eid al-Fitr	End of Ramadan
Rabi' al-Awwal 12	Mawlid	Birth of Muhammad

== Gallery ==
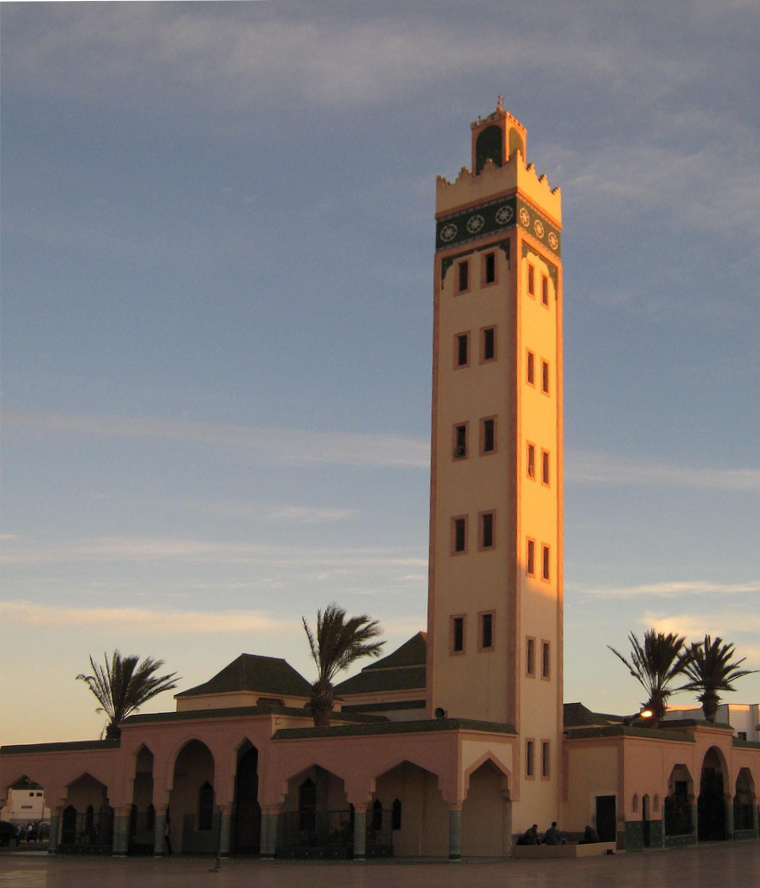
A mosque in Dakhla, a city under Moroccan occupation.

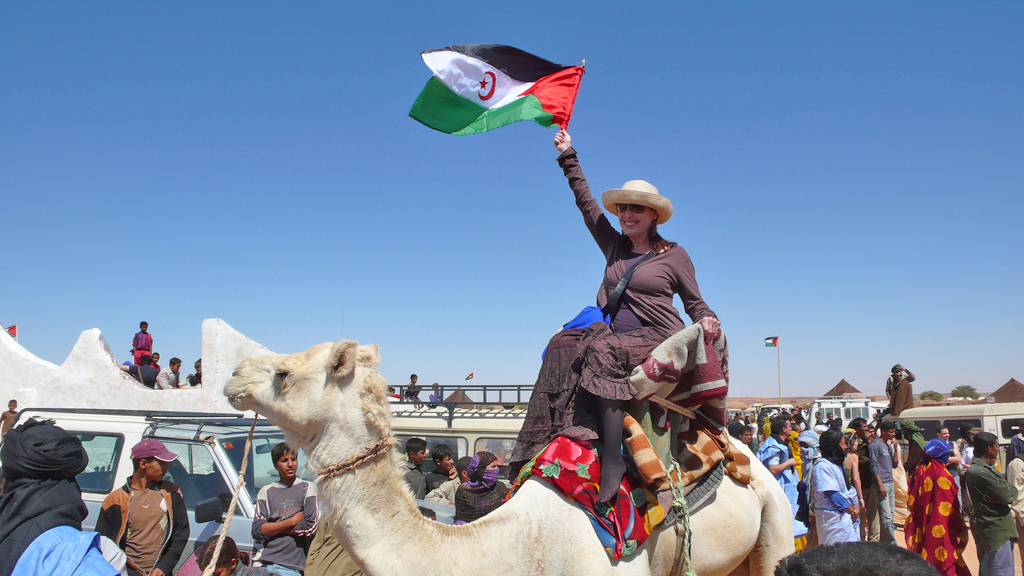
The Spanish actress Verónica Forqué at the Sahara Film Festival.

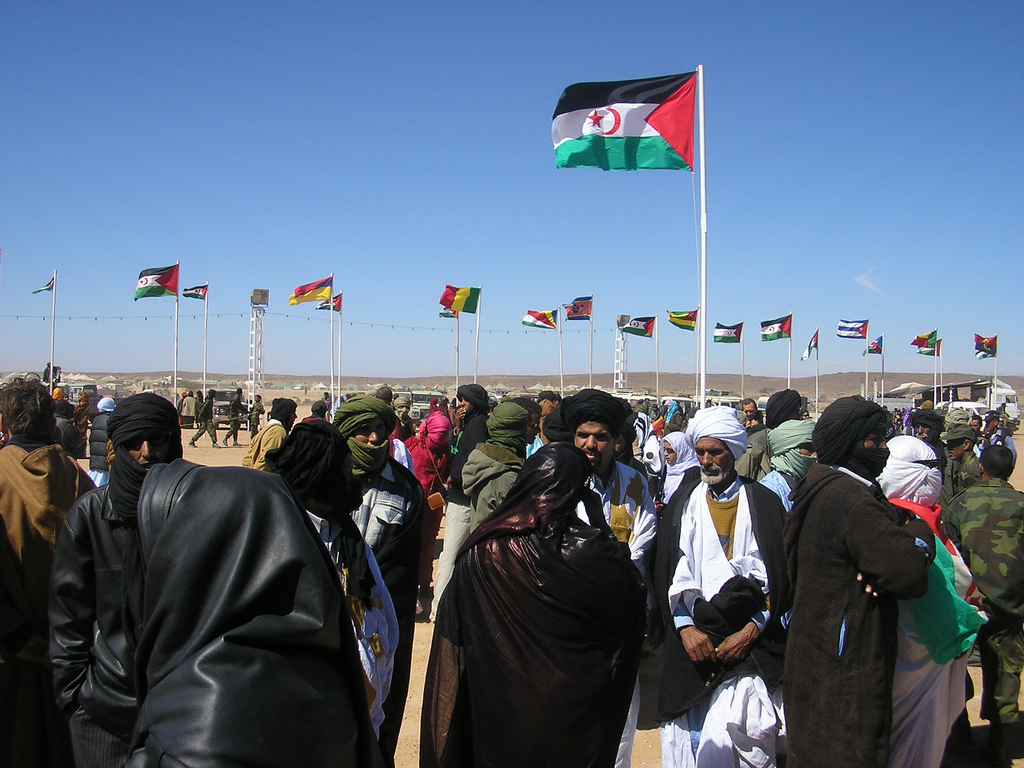
Commemoration of the 30th Independence Day in Tifariti, Liberated Territories, Western Sahara.

== See also ==
- Elections in the Sahrawi Arab Democratic Republic
- Foreign relations of the Sahrawi Arab Democratic Republic
- International recognition of the Sahrawi Arab Democratic Republic
- List of cities in Western Sahara
- Moroccan Western Sahara Wall
- Outline of the Sahrawi Arab Democratic Republic
- Political status of Western Sahara
- Politics of Western Sahara
