= List of cities in Western Sahara =

List of Human Settlements in Western Sahara

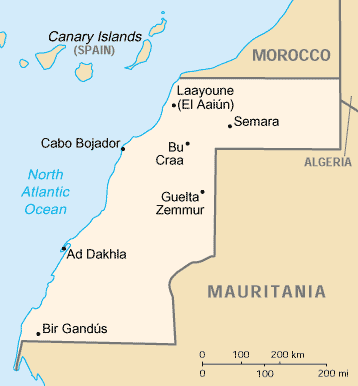
Map of Western Sahara

Location of cities in Western Sahara

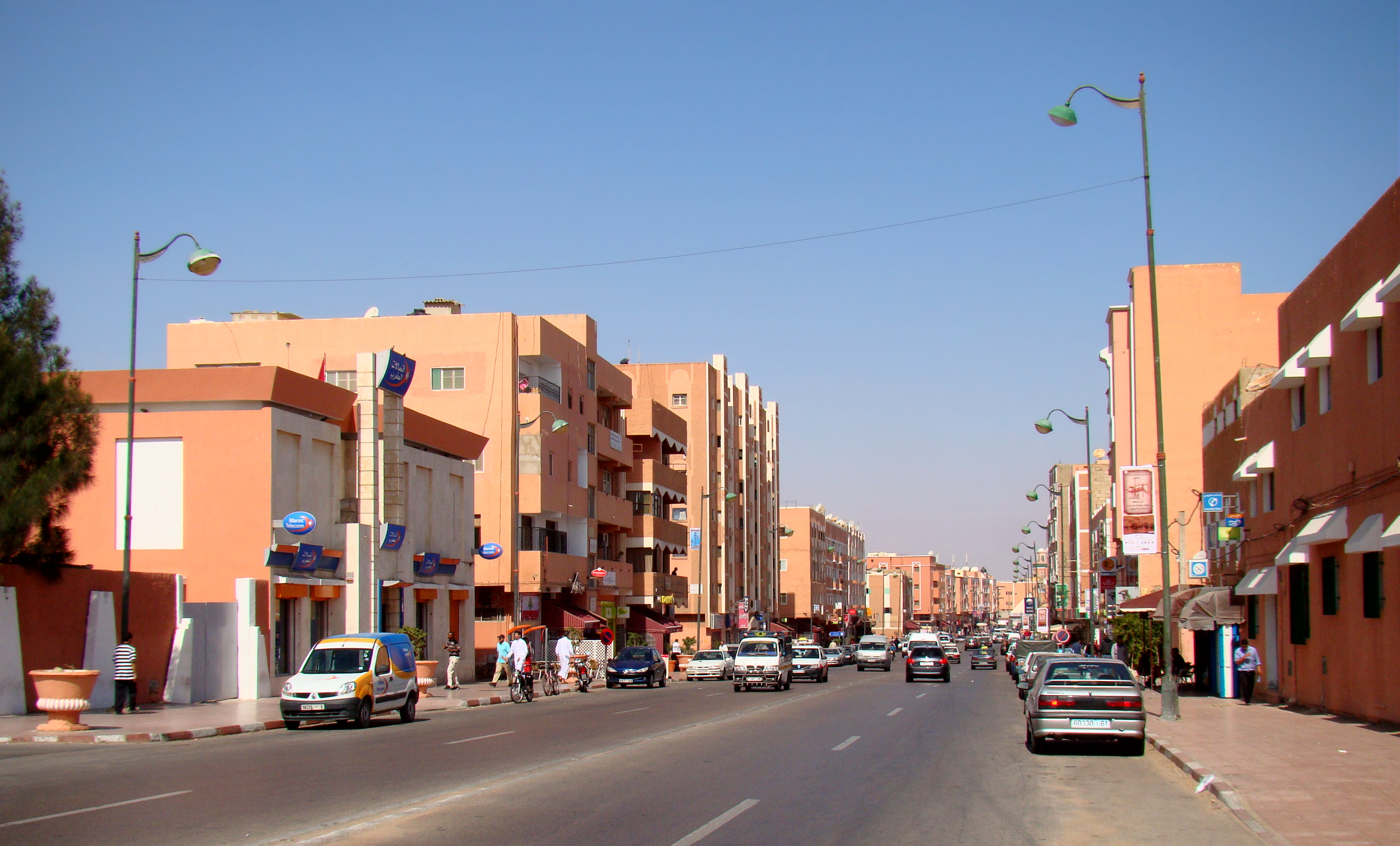
Laayoun

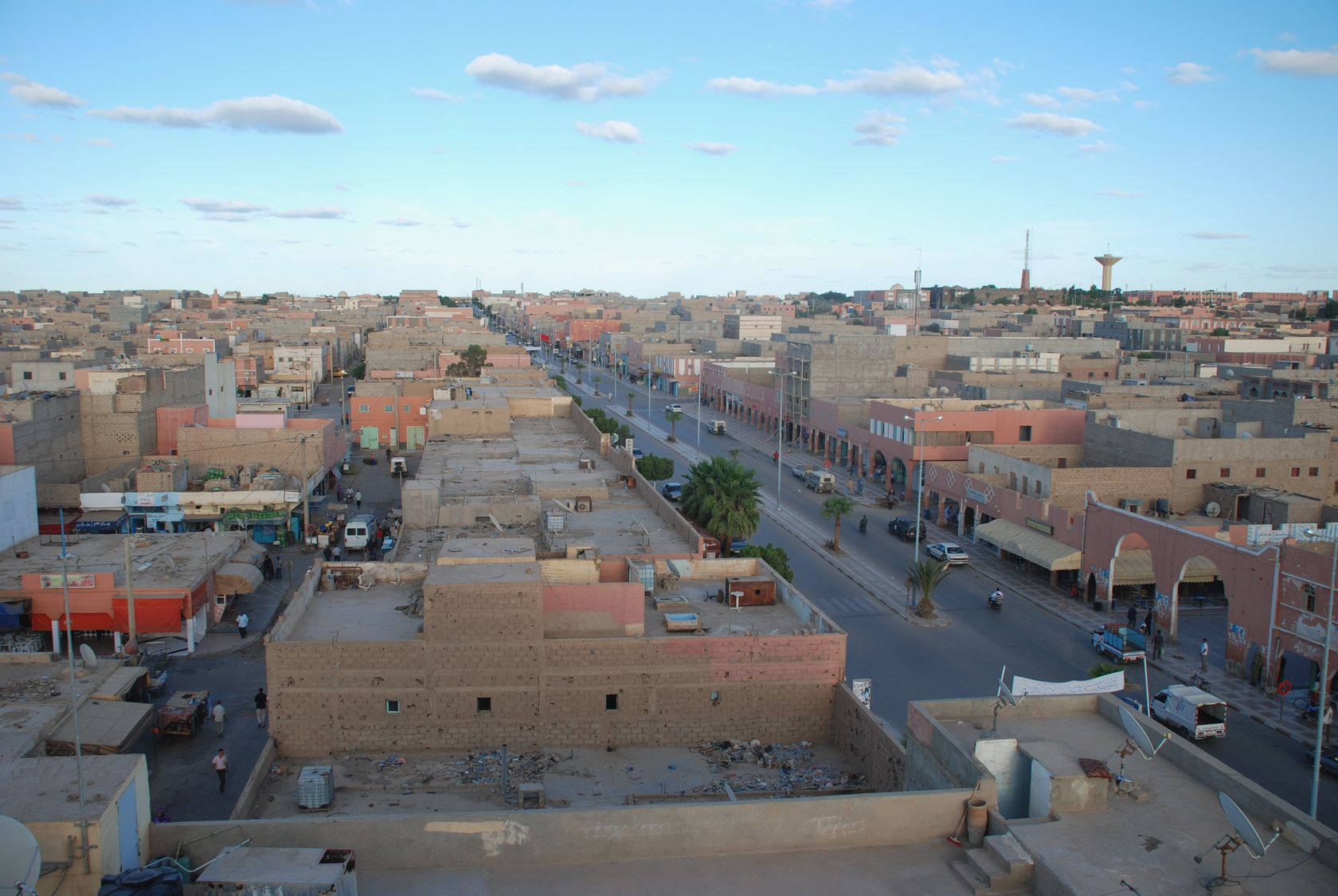
Smara

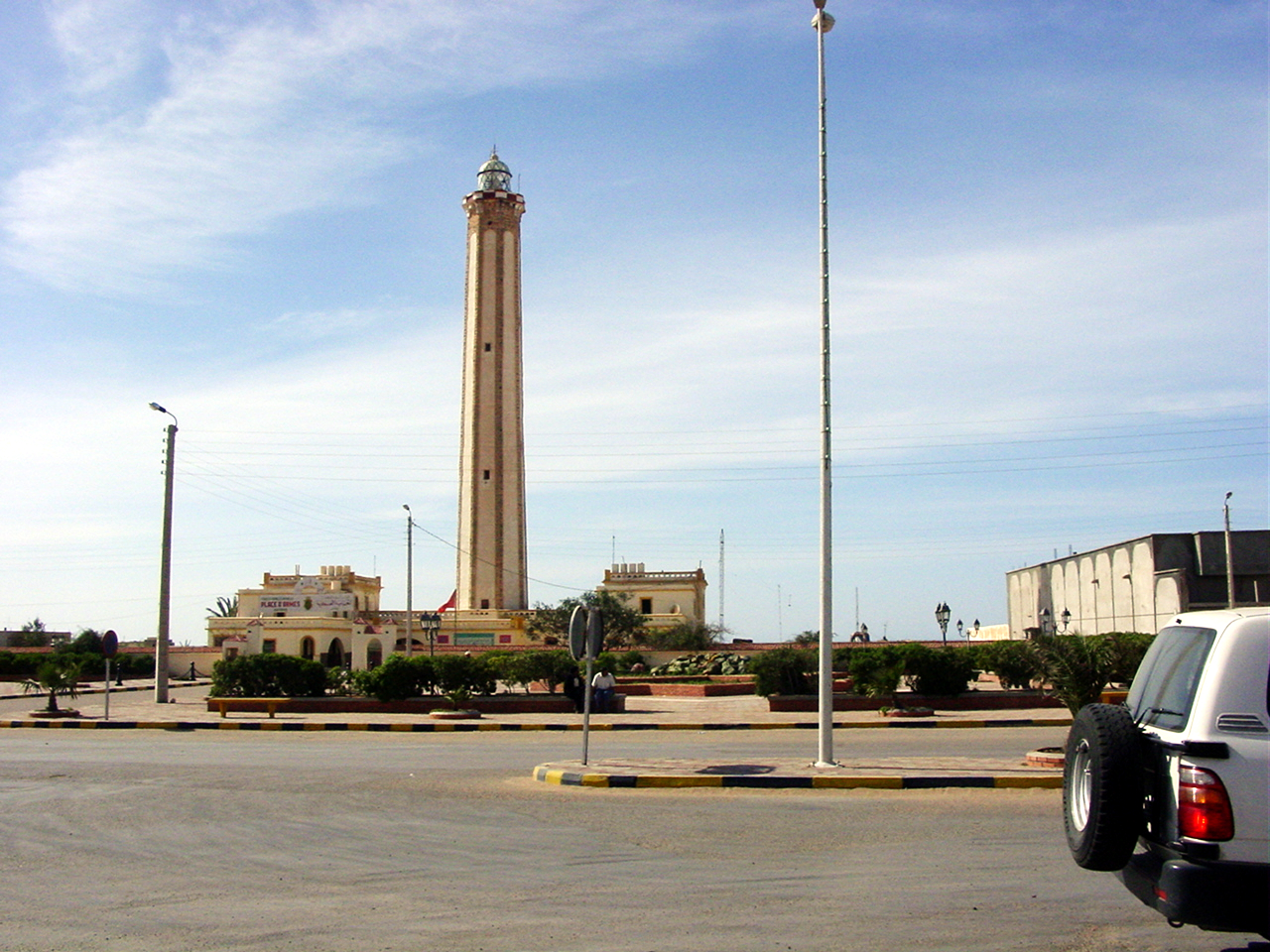
Cape Bojador

The following are cities in Western Sahara, listed by population. Due to an ongoing conflict over the territory, the majority is occupied by Morocco, and the eastern and southern portions are controlled by the Sahrawi Arab Democratic Republic (SADR). Only those cities under Moroccan occupation are subject to the government census; SADR-controlled cities are listed at the end. Morocco claims the entire territory, as does the SADR. The list includes cities, towns, villages, oases and other settlements.

== List ==
Overview of cities in Western Sahara
Name		Population			Status	
Transliteration	Arabic	1994 census	2004 census	2014 census	Location	Administration
Laayoune	العيون	136,950	179,542	217,732	North West	Morocco
Ad-Dakhla	الداخلة	29,831	55,618	106,277	North West	Morocco
Smara (Semara)	السمارة	28,750	33,910	57,035	North West	Morocco
Boujdour	بو جدور	15,167	36,731	42,651	North West	Morocco
El Marsa	المرسى	4,334	10,229	17,917	North West	Morocco
Hawza	الكويرة	2,940	3,726		North West	Morocco
Mahbes	المحبس	1,193	131		North West	Morocco
Guelta Zemmur	گَلتَة زَمُّور	4,716	512		North West	Morocco
Bir Anzarane	بئر إنزران	867	1,273		North West	Morocco
Tichla	تيشلا	290	469		North West	Morocco
Aousserd	أوسرد	672	976		North West	Morocco
El Argoub	العركوب	1,374	5,020		North West	Morocco
Bou Craa	بو كرع		2,519		North West	Morocco
Lamssid	لمسيد				North West	Morocco
Oum Dreyga	أم ادريكة				North West	Morocco
Jdiriya	اجديرية				North West	Morocco
Farciya	الفرسية				North West	Morocco
Sebaiera					North West	Morocco
Chalwa					North West	Morocco
Aridal					North West	Morocco
As-Sakn					North West	Morocco
Al Ga'da					North West	Morocco
Bir Gandouz	بئر كندوز				North West	Morocco
Guerguerat	الكركرات				North West	Morocco
Amgala	أمكالة		Included in Awserd		North East	Sahrawi Republic
Bir Lehlou	بير لحلو				North East	Sahrawi Republic
Tifariti	تيفاريتي		(near 3,000 by late estimates)	55	North East	Sahrawi Republic
Meharrize	محيرس				North East	Sahrawi Republic
Zug	الزوك		833		South East	Sahrawi Republic
Dougaj	دوكاج				South East	Sahrawi Republic
Agounit	أغوانيت				South East	Sahrawi Republic
Mijek (Miyek)	ميجك				South East	Sahrawi Republic
Bir Tiguisit	بير تيغیسیت				North East	Sahrawi Republic
Lagouira (La Güera, La Gouera)	الكويرة	509	3,726		South West	Mauritania

== See also ==
- List of cities in Morocco
- Moroccan Wall
- Tindouf and refugee camps
