= 1991 Tifariti offensive =

Operation Rattle
- Part of Western Sahara War
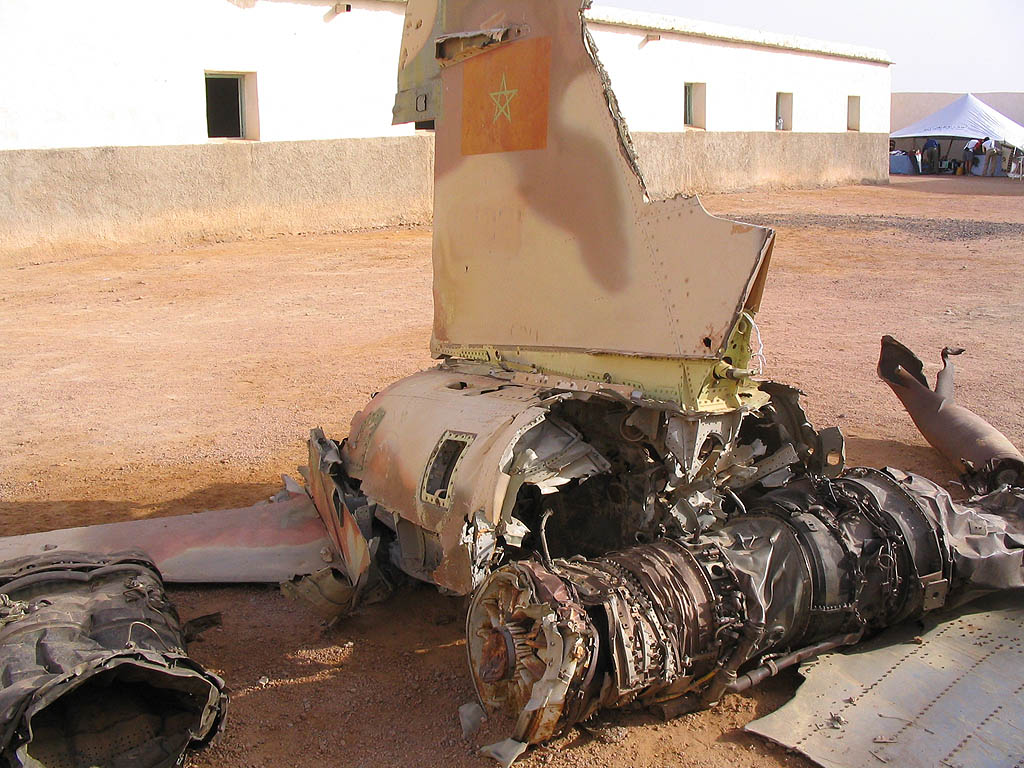
- Remains of a Moroccan Northrop F-5 shot down in Tifariti by guerilla forces during Operation Rattle.
Date	4 August 1991 to 6 September 1991
Location	Tifariti, Bir Lehlou, Mehaires, Mijek & Agwanit, Western Sahara
Result	Destruction of Tifariti & Bir Lehlou; temporary depopulation of the Liberated Territories

Belligerents
Morocco	Sahrawi Arab Democratic Republic; Polisario Front

Strength
10,000–100,000 soldiers 300 tanks Royal Moroccan Air Force support (14 planes)	Unknown

Casualties and losses
Unknown killed Unknown wounded 1 captured	Unknown killed Unknown wounded
- Civilian casualties: 30 killed 24 wounded 100 missing

Operation Rattle, also known as the 1991 Tifariti offensive, was the last military operation in the Western Sahara War by the Royal Moroccan Army against the Polisario Front, seeking independence for Western Sahara. A ceasefire (accorded to be in effect from 6 September 1991) had been agreed between the parts on July. During August and the first days of September 1991, the Royal Moroccan Army (RMA) conducted offensive operations in the areas of Mehaires, Tifariti, Bir Lahlou, Mijek and Agwanit, resulting in multiple Sahrawi civilian casualties, the destruction of Tifariti and Bir Lahlou, poisoning of the wells and subsequently depopulation of the area.

== Operation Rattle ==
Between 4–5 August, Moroccan troops and aviation attacked the towns of Tifariti, Mehaires and Mijek, destroying infrastructure that had been built for the nomad population of the area and the outcome of the referendum, and while a United Nations military experts mission was in the zone. POLISARIO sources stated that they had no military casualties, and on 13 August declared that one Sahrawi had been killed and another wounded during the attacks on Tifariti and Miyek. Sahrawi sources from Tindouf mentioned that three civilians were wounded during the attacks. On 4 August, a Moroccan Northrop F-5 was shot down by Sahrawi fighters near Tifariti, and his pilot Captain Youssef Megzari captured (he escaped from Tindouf prison in February 2005 along with another POW). While the POLISARIO saw the attacks as a Moroccan attempt to sabotage the peace plan, the Moroccan official news agency defined the attacks as a "cleansing operation in no-man's land" to avoid the "infiltration of elements armed and trained to make terrorist attacks on the Moroccan Sahara"

From 22 August, a second wave of attacks by the Moroccan forces took part on Tifariti, Bir Lehlou, Mijek and Agwanit. While Polisario Front sources defined the attacks as a "massive terrestrial offensive" and denounced the "systematic destruction of the water wells", MAP stated that since early August there had been "political operations of cleaning and searching in the no man's land", but denying that there were on a "greater scale". On 25 August, POLISARIO officials announced that Moroccan forces had reached the town of Bir Lehlou, the temporary capital of the Sahrawi Arab Democratic Republic, making hundreds of Sahrawi civilians flee into the desert. These sources stated that the Sahrawi forces were not opposing resistance to the Moroccan offensive, due to "respect to the date of September 6 marked by the UN peace plan for the ceasefire", but also adverted that if after the ceasefire date the attacks continued, "Sahrawis will be legitimated to exercise their self-defense right". Finally, they affirmed that at least twenty Sahrawi nomad civilians had died, most of them of thirst, during the Moroccan offensive. On 27 August, then UN Secretary-General Javier Pérez de Cuéllar expressed his confidence on the maintenance of the ceasefire date, while dismissing POLISARIO reports about the attacks. Moroccan press attacked Pérez de Cuellar, accusing him of not being neutral and creating confusion. Meanwhile, the Royal Moroccan Air Force bombed Tifariti again, killing at least five civilians, wounding 20 and destroying the infrastructure of the town, according to Hash Ahmed, then POLISARIO representative in Madrid, who added that ten thousand refugees on the Tifariti region were fleeing, and a hundred had disappeared. On 29 August Bachir Mustapha Sayed, POLISARIO representative for relations with the MINURSO, declared that the Moroccan troops were retreating into the Moroccan Wall.

== Cease fire ==
A cease-fire between the Polisario Front and Morocco, monitored by MINURSO (UN) has been in effect since 6 September 1991, with the promise of a referendum on independence the following year.

== See also ==
- Sahrawi refugees
