= List of twin towns and sister cities in Africa =

This is a list of places in the continent of Africa which have standing links to local communities in other countries. In most cases, the association, especially when formalised by local government, is known as "town twinning" (usually in Europe) or "sister cities" (usually in the rest of the world), and while most of the places included are towns, the list also includes villages, cities, districts, and counties with similar links.

== Algeria ==
Algiers

- Montreal, Canada
- Sofia, Bulgaria

Annaba

- Bizerte, Tunisia
- Yekaterinburg, Russia

Blida

- Dimitrovgrad, Bulgaria
- Kazanlak, Bulgaria
- Metz, France

Biskra

- Makhachkala, Russia

Chlef

- Skopje, North Macedonia

Constantine

- Grenoble, France
- Sousse, Tunisia

Mascara

- Bursa, Turkey
- Elkader, United States

Oran

- Alicante, Spain
- Bordeaux, France
- Dakar, Senegal
- Durban, South Africa
- Havana, Cuba
- Jeddah, Saudi Arabia
- Sfax, Tunisia
- Zarqa, Jordan

Sétif

- Lyon, France
- Rennes, France
- Tangier, Morocco

Tizi Ouzou

- Monastir, Tunisia
- La Roche-sur-Yon, France

Tlemcen

- Granada, Spain
- Lille, France
- Montpellier, France
- Nanterre, France
- Sarajevo, Bosnia and Herzegovina

== Angola ==
Cabinda

- Campinas, Brazil

Huambo

- Amadora, Portugal
- Caldas da Rainha, Portugal
- Castelo Branco, Portugal

Lobito

- Lowell, United States
- Seixal, Portugal
- Sintra, Portugal

Luanda

- Belo Horizonte, Brazil
- Busan, South Korea
- Houston, United States
- Lisbon, Portugal
- Oaxaca de Juárez, Mexico
- Porto, Portugal
- Salvador, Brazil

Lubango

- Santarém, Portugal

== Benin ==
Abomey

- Ostrava, Czech Republic

Cotonou

- Abidjan, Ivory Coast
- Atlanta, United States
- Rosny-sous-Bois, France
- Taipei, Taiwan

Djougou

- Évreux, France
- Al Wakrah, Qatar

Porto-Novo

- Lyon, France

== Botswana ==
Francistown

- Genk, Belgium
- Tai'an, China

Gaborone

- Burbank, United States

== Burkina Faso ==
Bobo-Dioulasso

- Bamako, Mali
- Bouaké, Ivory Coast
- Châlons-en-Champagne, France
- Fez, Morocco

Boussé

- Decatur, United States

Douroula

- Besançon, France

Fada N'gourma

- Épernay, France
- Great Barrington, United States

Garango

- Ladenburg, Germany
- Laval, France

Kaya

- Savannah, United States

Ouagadougou

- Bordeaux, France
- Briton Ferry, Wales, United Kingdom
- Grenoble, France
- Leuze-en-Hainaut, Belgium
- Loudun, France
- Lyon, France
- Nice, France
- Taipei, Taiwan
- Zhengzhou, China

Ouahigouya

- Chambéry, France
- Decatur, United States

== Burundi ==
Bujumbura

- Cape Town, South Africa
- Hefei, China

== Cameroon ==
Bamenda

- Dordrecht, Netherlands
- Lowell, United States

Douala

- Philadelphia, United States
- Taiyuan, China

Limbe

- Seattle, United States

Yaoundé

- Edessa, Greece
- Shenyang, China
- Udine, Italy

== Central African Republic ==
Bangui

- Çankaya, Turkey

== Chad ==
N'Djamena

- Istanbul, Turkey
- Liuzhou, China
- Stupino, Russia

== Congo ==
Brazzaville

- Bolingbrook, United States
- Changsha, China
- Dakar, Senegal
- Dresden, Germany
- Havana, Cuba
- Kinshasa, Democratic Republic of the Congo
- Nouakchott, Mauritania
- Reims, France

Pointe-Noire

- Dalian, China
- New Orleans, United States
- Suzhou, China

== Democratic Republic of the Congo ==
Bukavu

- Palermo, Italy

Kinshasa

- Ankara, Turkey
- (Republic of the Congo) Brazzaville, Congo
- Dakar, Senegal

Lubumbashi

- Liège, Belgium

Mwanza

- Tulsa, United States

== Djibouti ==
Djibouti City

- Saint Paul, United States
- Sancaktepe, Turkey

== Equatorial Guinea ==
Malabo

- Guadalajara, Mexico
- Madrid, Spain

== Eswatini ==
Manzini

- Keighley, England, United Kingdom

Mbabane

- Fort Worth, United States
- Kaohsiung, Taiwan
- Matola, Mozambique
- Mbombela, South Africa
- Taipei, Taiwan

== Ethiopia ==
Adama

- Aurora, United States

Addis Ababa

- Ankara, Turkey
- Beersheba, Israel
- Beijing, China
- Chuncheon, South Korea
- Harare, Zimbabwe
- Johannesburg, South Africa
- Khartoum, Sudan
- Leipzig, Germany
- Lusaka, Zambia
- Lyon, France
- Nairobi, Kenya
- Washington, D.C., United States
- Windhoek, Namibia

Axum

- Denver, United States

Bahir Dar

- Ashdod, Israel
- Białystok, Poland
- Cleveland, United States
- Madison, United States
- Oakland, United States

Dire Dawa

- Shijiazhuang, China

Gondar

- Corvallis, United States
- Montgomery County, United States
- Rishon LeZion, Israel

Mekelle

- Ramla, Israel
- Witten, Germany

== Gabon ==
Libreville

- Durban, South Africa
- Nice, France

== Gambia ==
Banjul

- Brooklyn Park, United States
- Dakar, Senegal
- Doha, Qatar
- Nanning, China
- Ostend, Belgium
- Taipei, Taiwan

Kanifing

- Madison, United States
- Memphis, United States

== Ghana ==
Aboadze

- Buffalo, United States

Accra

- Akron, United States
- Cape Town, South Africa
- Cheyenne, United States
- Chicago, United States
- Columbia, United States
- Columbus, United States
- North Miami Beach, United States

Cape Coast

- Bonn, Germany
- Buffalo, United States
- Hanover Park, United States
- New Orleans, United States

Ho

- Gainesville, United States

Kumasi

- Charlotte, United States
- Dortmund, Germany
- Newark, United States
- Wenzhou, China
- Winston-Salem, United States

Sekondi-Takoradi

- Boston, United States
- Oakland, United States

Sunyani

- Tuscaloosa, United States

Tamale

- Louisville, United States

Techiman

- Tuscaloosa, United States

Tema

- Cleveland, United States
- Columbia, United States
- Greenwich, England, United Kingdom
- Loudoun County, United States
- Norfolk, United States
- San Diego, United States

Winneba

- Birmingham, United States
- Charlottesville, United States
- Lowell, United States

== Guinea ==
Conakry

- Cleveland, United States
- Dakar, Senegal

== Guinea-Bissau ==
Bissau

- Águeda, Portugal
- Ankara, Turkey
- Dakar, Senegal
- Lisbon, Portugal
- Sintra, Portugal
- Taipei, Taiwan

Cacheu

- Lisbon, Portugal
- Viana do Castelo, Portugal

== Ivory Coast ==
Abidjan

- Cotonou, Benin
- Marseille, France
- Nice, France
- San Francisco, United States
- São Paulo, Brazil
- Tianjin, China
- Viseu, Portugal

Anyama

- Pontault-Combault, France

Bouaké

- Bobo-Dioulasso, Burkina Faso
- Coslada, Spain
- Reutlingen, Germany
- Villeneuve-sur-Lot, France

Daloa

- Campinas, Brazil
- Pau, France

Man

- Besançon, France

== Lesotho ==
Hlotse

- Crymych, Wales, United Kingdom

Maseru

- Austin, United States

== Liberia ==
Barclayville

- Lowell, United States

Buchanan

- Winston-Salem, United States

Gbarnga

- Baltimore, United States

Kakata

- Brooklyn Park, United States

Monrovia

- Dayton, United States
- Taipei, Taiwan

== Libya ==
Benghazi

- Istanbul, Turkey

Tripoli

- Belo Horizonte, Brazil
- Cairo, Egypt
- Madrid, Spain
- El Mina, Lebanon
- Sarajevo, Bosnia and Herzegovina

== Madagascar ==
Ambalavao

- Quatre Bornes, Mauritius

Antsirabe

- Montluçon, France
- Stavanger, Norway
- Vacoas-Phoenix, Mauritius

Antsiranana

- Port Louis, Mauritius

Antananarivo

- Montreal, Canada
- Nanning, China
- Nice, France
- Suzhou, China
- Vorkuta, Russia
- Yerevan, Armenia

== Malawi ==
Blantyre

- Hanover, Germany
- Kaohsiung, Taiwan

Lilongwe

- Nanning, China
- Taipei, Taiwan

Zomba

- Urbana, United States

== Mali ==
Bamako

- Angers, France
- Ashgabat, Turkmenistan
- Bobo-Dioulasso, Burkina Faso
- Bordeaux, France
- Dakar, Senegal
- Nouakchott, Mauritania
- Rochester, United States

Ségou

- Angoulême, France
- Richmond, United States

Timbuktu

- Chemnitz, Germany
- Hay-on-Wye, Wales, United Kingdom
- Kairouan, Tunisia
- Marrakesh, Morocco
- Saintes, France
- Tempe, United States

== Mauritania ==
Nouadhibou

- Casablanca, Morocco
- Fuzhou, China
- Las Palmas, Spain

Nouakchott

- Bamako, Mali
- Dakar, Senegal
- East Jerusalem, Palestine
- Lanzhou, China
- Madrid, Spain

== Mauritius ==
Beau Bassin-Rose Hill

- Changzhou, China

Curepipe

- Meixian (Meizhou), China
- La Teste-de-Buch, France

Grand Port

- Baie Lazare, Seychelles
- Qingdao, China
- Spelthorne, England, United Kingdom
- Tsiafahy, Madagascar

Port Louis

- Alexandria, Egypt
- Antsiranana, Madagascar
- Dakar, Senegal
- Doha, Qatar
- Foshan, China
- Karachi, Pakistan
- Lamentin, Guadeloupe, France
- Maputo, Mozambique
- Port Mathurin, Mauritius
- La Possession, Réunion, France
- Pretoria, South Africa
- Saint-Malo, France

Quatre Bornes

- Ambalavao, Madagascar
- Daqing, China
- Saint-Benoît, Réunion, France

Vacoas-Phoenix

- Antsirabe, Madagascar
- Pune, India
- Sainte-Suzanne, Réunion, France

== Mozambique ==
Beira

- Arganil, Portugal
- Boston, United States
- Bristol, England, United Kingdom
- Coimbra, Portugal
- Padua, Italy
- Porto, Portugal
- Seixal, Portugal
- Sintra, Portugal

Maputo

- Ankara, Turkey
- Chengdu, China
- Durban, South Africa
- Guarulhos, Brazil
- Jakarta, Indonesia
- Lisbon, Portugal
- Rio de Janeiro, Brazil
- Port Louis, Mauritius
- Shanghai, China

Mocuba

- Vila Nova de Famalicão, Portugal

Pemba

- Reggio Emilia, Italy

== Namibia ==
Windhoek

- Addis Ababa, Ethiopia
- Berlin, Germany
- Havana, Cuba
- Johannesburg, South Africa
- Kingston, Jamaica
- Nanjing, China
- Richmond, United States
- San Antonio, United States
- Shanghai, China
- Suzhou, China
- Trossingen, Germany

Walvis Bay

- Drakenstein, South Africa
- Kristiansand, Norway
- Lobatse, Botswana
- Wenzhou, China

== Niger ==
Niamey

- Ankara, Turkey

== Nigeria ==
Abuja

- Milwaukee, United States

Asaba

- Stockton, United States

Ibadan

- Cleveland, United States

Ifẹ

- Oberlin, United States
- Salvador, Brazil
- San Bernardino, United States

Lagos

- Atlanta, United States
- Belo Horizonte, Brazil
- Bucharest, Romania
- Port of Spain, Trinidad and Tobago

Onitsha

- Compton, United States
- Indianapolis, United States

Orlu

- Austin, United States

Osogbo

- Asheville, United States
- Wilmington, United States
- Xiangyang, China

Owerri

- Gresham, United States

Port Harcourt

- Kansas City, United States

Udu

- Brooklyn Park, United States

== Rwanda ==
Kigali

- Cleveland, United States
- Oklahoma City, United States
- San Bernardino, United States

== São Tomé and Principe ==
Lembá

- Moura, Portugal
- Porto, Portugal
- Santa Marta de Penaguião, Portugal

Lobata

- Seixal, Portugal
- Vila Nova de Famalicão, Portugal

Mé-Zóchi

- Guimarães, Portugal
- Tarrafal, Cape Verde

Príncipe

- Amadora, Portugal
- Faro, Portugal
- Marco de Canaveses, Portugal
- Oeiras, Portugal

São Tomé

- Lisbon, Portugal

== Senegal ==
Dakar

- Ann Arbor, United States
- Baku, Azerbaijan
- Bamako, Mali
- (The Gambia) Banjul, Gambia
- Bissau, Guinea-Bissau
- (Republic of the Congo) Brazzaville, Congo
- Casablanca, Morocco
- Conakry, Guinea
- Dijon, France
- Isfahan, Iran
- Kinshasa, Democratic Republic of the Congo
- Marseille, France
- Miami-Dade County, United States
- Milan, Italy
- Nouakchott, Mauritania
- Oran, Algeria
- Port Louis, Mauritius
- Rosario, Argentina
- Sfax, Tunisia
- Taipei, Taiwan
- Washington, D.C., United States

Diourbel

- Avignon, France

Guédiawaye

- Birmingham, United States

Kaolack

- Aosta, Italy
- Mérignac, France

M'Bour

- Concarneau, France
- Jackson, United States
- Molenbeek-Saint-Jean, Belgium

Rufisque

- Hénin-Beaumont, France
- Rio de Janeiro, Brazil

Saint-Louis

- Białystok, Poland
- Bologna, Italy
- Fez, Morocco
- Liège, Belgium
- Lille, France
- St. Louis, United States

Thiès

- Caen, France
- Cayenne, French Guiana, France
- Solingen, Germany
- Sousse, Tunisia

Ziguinchor

- Compiègne, France
- Rimini, Italy
- Saint-Maur-des-Fossés, France
- São Filipe, Cape Verde
- Viana do Castelo, Portugal

== Seychelles ==
Victoria

- Haikou, China
- Hanoi, Vietnam
- Panaji, India

== Sierra Leone ==
Freetown

- Charleston, United States
- Hefei, China
- Kansas City, United States
- Kingston upon Hull, England, United Kingdom
- New Haven, United States

== Somalia ==
Galkayo

- Bursa, Turkey

Mogadishu

- Ankara, Turkey
- Doha, Qatar
- Konya, Turkey
- Saint Paul, United States

== Sudan ==
El-Gadarif

- Khan Yunis, Palestine

Khartoum

- Addis Ababa, Ethiopia
- Ankara, Turkey
- Brasília, Brazil
- Cairo, Egypt
- Istanbul, Turkey
- Manisa, Turkey
- Saint Petersburg, Russia
- Tehran, Iran
- Wuhan, China

== Tanzania ==
Arusha

- Durham, United States
- Mürzzuschlag, Austria
- Kansas City, United States
- Tifariti, Western Sahara

Dar es Salaam

- Busan, South Korea
- Changzhou, China
- Hamburg, Germany
- Liuzhou, China
- Samsun, Turkey

Dodoma

- Linz, Austria

Moshi

- Delray Beach, United States
- Halmstad, Sweden
- Tübingen, Germany

Mtwara

- Redditch, England, United Kingdom

Musoma

- Calderdale, England, United Kingdom

Mwanza

- Tampere, Finland
- Würzburg, Germany

Singida

- Salzburg, Austria

Tanga

- Eckernförde, Germany
- Toledo, United States

Zanzibar City

- Haikou, China
- Potsdam, Germany
- Sakarya, Turkey

== Togo ==
Atakpamé

- Niort, France

Dapaong

- Issy-les-Moulineaux, France

Kpalimé

- Bressuire, France

Lomé

- Duisburg, Germany
- Shenzhen, China
- Taipei, Taiwan

Tsévié

- Parthenay, France
- Plainfaing, France

== Uganda ==
Entebbe

- Ashkelon, Israel
- Kalmar, Sweden
- Wuhan, China

== Western Sahara ==
Bir Lehlou

- Campi Bisenzio, Italy
- Montevarchi, Italy
- Novelda, Spain
- Pozuelo de Alarcón, Spain
- Prato, Italy

Dakhla

- Bethlehem, Palestine
- Cádiz, Spain
- Creil, France
- Crotone, Italy
- Great Neck, United States
- Vibo Valentia, Italy

Laayoune

- Hollywood, United States
- Montevideo, Uruguay

La Güera

- Leganés, Spain
- Londa, Italy
- El Puerto de Santa María, Spain
- Valle de Yerri / Deierri, Spain
- Vitoria-Gasteiz, Spain

Tifariti

- Arusha, Tanzania
- Balmaseda, Spain
- Carmona, Spain
- Los Palacios y Villafranca, Spain
- Reggiolo, Italy

Zug

- Medina del Campo, Spain
- Torrelavega, Spain
- Valdemoro, Spain
- Zumaia, Spain

== Zambia ==
Kasama

- Clovis, United States

Kitwe

- Baia Mare, Romania
- Detroit, United States
- Sheffield, England, United Kingdom

Livingstone

- Funchal, Portugal
- Santa Fe, United States

Lusaka

- Addis Ababa, Ethiopia
- Albuquerque, United States
- Białystok, Poland
- Dushanbe, Tajikistan
- Los Angeles, United States
- Nanjing, China

Ndola

- Makhachkala, Russia
- Porto, Portugal

== Zimbabwe ==
Bulawayo

- Aberdeen, Scotland, United Kingdom
- Pretoria, South Africa

Harare

- Addis Ababa, Ethiopia
- Cincinnati, United States
- Guangzhou, China
- Kazan, Russia
- Munich, Germany
- Nottingham, England, United Kingdom

Mutare

- Portland, United States
