= Diabene, Ghana =

Diabene
- Country: Ghana
- Region: Western Region (Ghana)

Diabene is a town in the Western region of Ghana. It is 15 kilometres from the centre Takoradi the Western regional capital. The serves as a dormitory town for workers who work in and around the Takoradi metropolis.

== Boundaries ==
The town is bordered on Mpintsin on the East, Fijai on the North and Sekondi on the south.

== Notable place ==
The town has a secondary technical school - The Diabene Secondary Technical School. It is a unisex secondary institution that offers course mostly in Metal work, wood work etc.
