= Zahra el Hasnaoui Ahmed =

- Born: 1963; Laayoune
- Occupation: Poet

Zahra el Hasnaoui Ahmed (born 1963) is a Western Saharan poet and journalist. She is a leading figure in the Friendship Generation of Saharawi Spanish-language poets. She published the poetry collection El silencio de las nubes ("The Silence of the Clouds", 2017).

Zahra el Hasnaoui Ahmed was born in 1963 in El Aaiún in the colony of Spanish Sahara. She was in her final year of primary education in 1975 when Spain withdrew from the Western Sahara and the territory was invaded by Morocco and Mauritania. She was able to finish her next two years of education thanks to Spanish teachers who stayed behind under Moroccan occupation. She completed her secondary education in Tangiers and attended college in Spain, graduating from the Universidad Complutense de Madrid with a BA degree in English.

el Hasnaoui Ahmed lived in the Sahrawi refugee camps in Algeria for several years and worked on Spanish-language programming for Sahrawi National Radio. She returned to Spain in 1991.

In 2005, el Hasnaoui Ahmed and ten other Spanish-language Sahrawi poets signed a manifesto and dubbed themselves the Generación de la Amistad ("Friendship Generation") in tribute to the Spanish modernismo literary group Generation of 1927. el Hasnaoui Ahmed's poetry has appeared in the Sahrawi anthologies Aaiún, gritando lo que se siente (‘Aaiún, Crying What Is Felt’. 2006), Um Draiga (2007), and VerSahara (2016). English translations of her poems appeared in the anthology Poems for the Millennium, Volume Four: The University of California Book of North African Literature.

== Bibliography ==
- El Hasnaoui Ahmed, Zahra (2017). El silencio de las nubes. Arma Poética. ISBN 9788494627682.
