= Bir Tiguisit =

Bir Tiguisit بير تيغیسیت Buir Tiguisit Bir Tighissit
- Locality
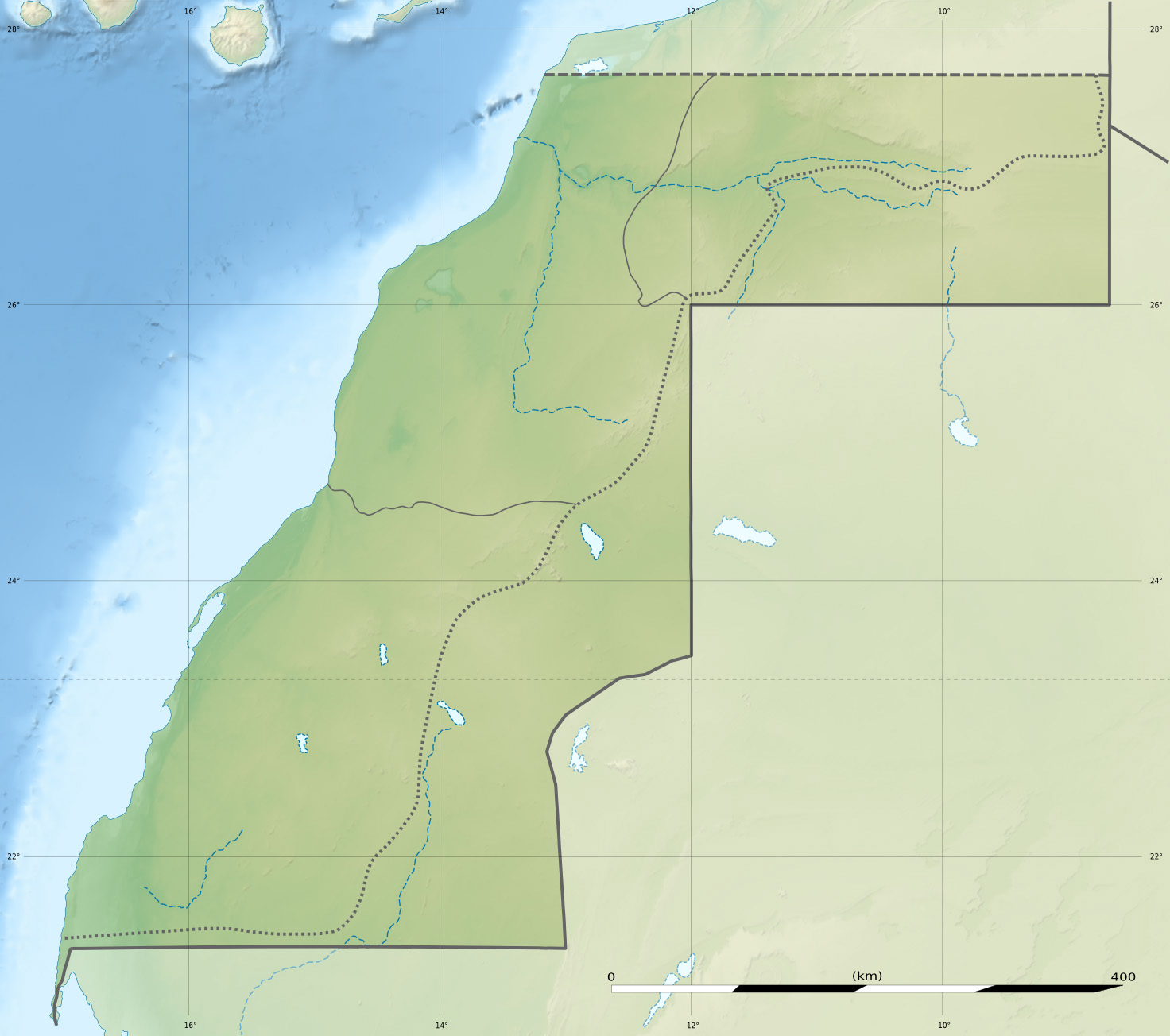
- Location in Western Sahara Bir Tiguisit (Africa)
- Coordinates: 26°02′00″N 10°29′46″W
- Territory: Western Sahara
- Claimed by: Morocco; Sahrawi Arab Democratic Republic
- Controlled by: Sahrawi Arab Democratic Republic

Government
  - Type: Locality

Area
  - Total: 4.8 km^{2} (1.9 sq mi)
- Time zone: UTC+0 (GMT)
- Climate: BWh

Bir Tiguisit, Buir Tiguisit or Bir Tighissit (Arabic: بير تيغیسیت) is a locality located in the southern part of Saguia el-Hamra, in Western Sahara. It is located south of Tifariti, near the border with Mauritania. It is currently controlled by the Polisario Front, in the Liberated Territories.

The demining carried out by MINURSO has made this population revitalized. It consists of a small hospital, a school and some small shops.

Bir Tiguisit is located near the remains of the old Spanish colonial town of Colomina and one of the bases of MINURSO.
