= Aboadze =

- Location in Ghana
- Coordinates: 4°58′0″N 1°37′0″W
- Country: Ghana
- Region: Western Region (Ghana)

Aboadze is a town in the Western region of Ghana. It serves both as a dormitory town as well as an industrialized zone. It also houses Ghana's first thermal plant for electricity production.

== Geography ==
The town is located 20 kilometres from the centre of Takoradi, the capital of the Western region. The town is bordered on the east by Shama, on the west by Inchaban and on the south by the Atlantic Ocean.
