= Free Zone (region) =

Region of Western Sahara

Coordinates: 23.349°N 12.933°W

The Free Zone or Liberated Territories (Arabic: المنطقة الحرة, romanized: al-minṭaqa al-ḥurra) are terms used by the Polisario Front government of the Sahrawi Arab Democratic Republic, a partially recognized sovereign state in the western Maghreb, to describe the part of Western Sahara that lies to the east of a 2,200-kilometre (1,400 mi) border wall flanked by a minefield, often referred as the Berm, and to the west and north of the borders with Algeria and Mauritania, respectively. It is controlled by the Sahrawi Arab Democratic Republic, as opposed to the area to the west of the Berm, which is occupied by Morocco as part of its Southern Provinces. Both states claim the entirety of Western Sahara as their territory.

The zone was consolidated as a Polisario-held zone in a 1991 cease-fire between the Polisario Front and Morocco, which had been agreed upon together as part of the Settlement Plan. Morocco occupies the areas west of the Berm, including most of the territory's population. The cease-fire is overseen by the United Nations' MINURSO forces, charged with peacekeeping in the area and the organization of a referendum on independence.

== Status and military agreement ==
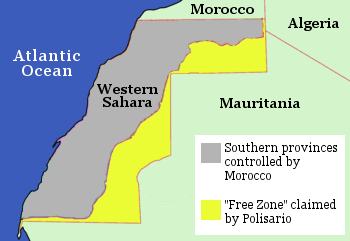
The Berm follows the line between the grey and yellow areas.

The status of Western Sahara is hotly disputed between Polisario and Morocco, and this includes the names used to refer to areas under the control of the different sides.

Morocco routinely refers to the Polisario-held region as a "buffer zone", or "buffer strip", and claims that Polisario forces are not allowed entry, and that both military activities and civilian construction in this area constitute violations of their cease-fire agreement. The Polisario Front, on the other hand, claims this does not correspond to the provisions of the agreement regulating the territory's status, which Morocco signed in 1991, and regards the "buffer strip" as only a slim portion of the entire territory. This zone serves as a division-of-forces no man's land. Areas outside this zone are open to activity by the side that controls them, provided they adhere to some restrictions on military movements. Similarly, Polisario call the areas a "liberated territory" or the "free zone", but this is not an official designation. The UN calls it simply "east of the Berm", and refers to territories under Moroccan occupation as "west of the Berm", thus not giving sanction to the claims of either party.

According to the Settlement Plan, the movement of Polisario fighters is restricted similarly to how Moroccan forces face restrictions on their side of the Berm. The MINURSO details the following restrictions for the different zones:

- One 5-kilometre-wide (3 mi) Buffer Strip (BS) to the south and east side of the Berm;
- Two 30-kilometre-wide (19 mi) Restricted Areas (RA) along the Berm. The Buffer Strip is included in the Restricted Area on the POLISARIO (FPOL) side and the Berm is included in the Restricted Area on the Military of Morocco (RMA) side;
- Two Areas with Limited Restrictions (ALR), which are the two remaining vast, stretches of land of Western Sahara on both sides respectively.

Each of the five parts has specific restrictions as for the two parties' military activities:

- Buffer Strip: No entry of RMA and FPOL personnel and equipment, by ground or air. No firing of weapons in or over the area.
- Restricted Areas: No firing of weapons and/or military training exercises, with the exception of physical training activities of unarmed personnel. No tactical reinforcements, no redeployment or movement of troops, headquarters/units, stores, equipment, ammunition, weapons, no entry of military aircraft and no improvements of defence infrastructures. Some exceptions apply and some activities are allowed after prior information to or approval by MINURSO (Note: these are restrictions in brief, for detailed information please read the MA#1 in full).
- Areas with Limited Restrictions: All normal military activities can be carried out, except the reinforcement of existing minefields, the laying of mines, the concentration of forces, the construction of new headquarters, barracks and ammunition storage facilities. MINURSO need to be informed if the parties intend to conduct military exercises, including the firing of weapons of a calibre above 9mm.

== Population and activities in the area ==
The population of the territory east of the Wall is estimated to be less than 10,000 inhabitants. By comparison, it is estimated that 618,600 inhabitants live west of the Wall, of which Moroccan settlers make up at least two thirds. Following the 1975 Green March, the Moroccan state has sponsored settlement schemes enticing thousands of Moroccans to move into the Moroccan-occupied part (approx. 70% of the disputed territory).

The major settlements on the zone are Tifariti (current temporary capital), Bir Lehlou (former temporary capital), Agounit, Dougaj, Meharrize, Mijek, and Zug.

Access is difficult even for Sahrawis due to the harsh climate of the Sahara, the military conflict and the abundance of land mines. The area is inhabited primarily by Sahrawi nomads, that maintain the traditional camel herding of their ancestors, between the zone, northern Mauritania and the refugee camps. There is also a small merchant population, who sell goods to travellers.

Major Sahrawi political events, such as Polisario congresses and opening sessions of the Sahrawi National Council (the SADR parliament in exile) are held in the zone (especially in Tifariti and Bir Lehlou), since it is considered socially, politically and symbolically important to conduct political affairs on Sahrawi land.

== Polisario Force strength ==
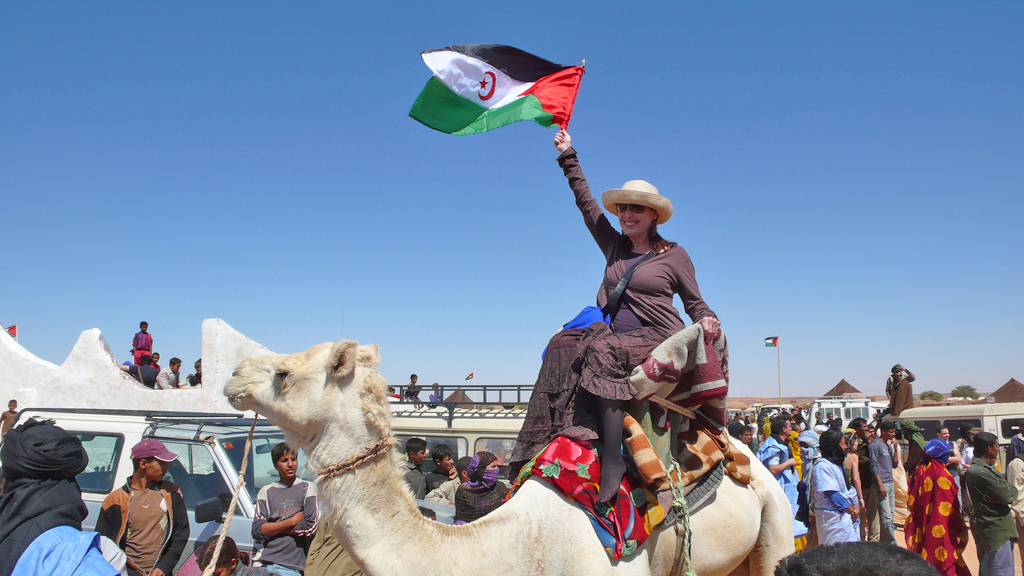
The Spanish actress Verónica Forqué at the Sahara Film Festival.

The Polisario troops (of the Sahrawi People's Liberation Army (SPLA)) in the area are divided into seven "military regions", each controlled by a top commander reporting to the President of the Polisario proclaimed Sahrawi Arab Democratic Republic. The total size of the Polisario's guerrilla army present in this area is unknown. Some sources claim between 3,000 and 6,000 men, while others rise the number up to 12,000, with additional combatants stationed in Algeria, Mauritania or having been demobilized due to the cease-fire. These forces are dug into permanent positions, such as gun emplacements, defensive trenches and underground military bases, as well as conducting mobile patrols of the territory.

== Incidents in the area ==
A concentration of forces for the commemoration of the Saharawi Republic's 30th anniversary were however subject to reproach by the United Nations, as it was considered an example of a cease-fire violation to bring such a large force concentration into the area.

Minurso reports that there are on average 2–4 such violations in the whole Western Sahara territory each month, between the two sides. In addition to this, there are several more violations related to local commanders on both sides refusing the inspection of their forces by Minurso personnel. As an example, the mission homepage quotes the month of June 2006, when there were "189 such FMO [freedom of movement]-violations, all related to the denial of UNMO [UN military officers] entry into the parties' strong-points and units."

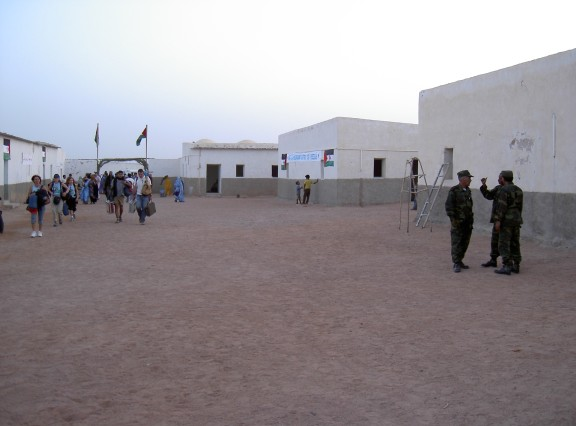
Tifariti, in the northeast of the zone, 2005

Annual demonstrations against the Moroccan Wall are staged in the region by Sahrawis and international activists from Spain, Italy and other mainly European countries. These actions are closely monitored by the UN.

== See also ==
- History of Western Sahara
- List of cities in Western Sahara
- Safe Zone (Syria)
- United Nations Safe Areas
- Demilitarized zone
