= Mpintsin =

Mpinstsin
- Country: Ghana
- Region: Western Region (Ghana)

Mpinstin is a town in the Western region of Ghana. It is 4.4 kilometres from the centre Sekondi Takoradi the Western regional capital. It serves as a dormitory town for workers who work in and around the Takoradi metropolis.

== Boundaries ==
The town is bordered on Inchaban on the East, Kojokrom on the West, Inchaban Nkwanta on the North and Ngyiresia on the south.
