= Dougaj =

Dougaj Duguech (Spanish)
- Municipality and town
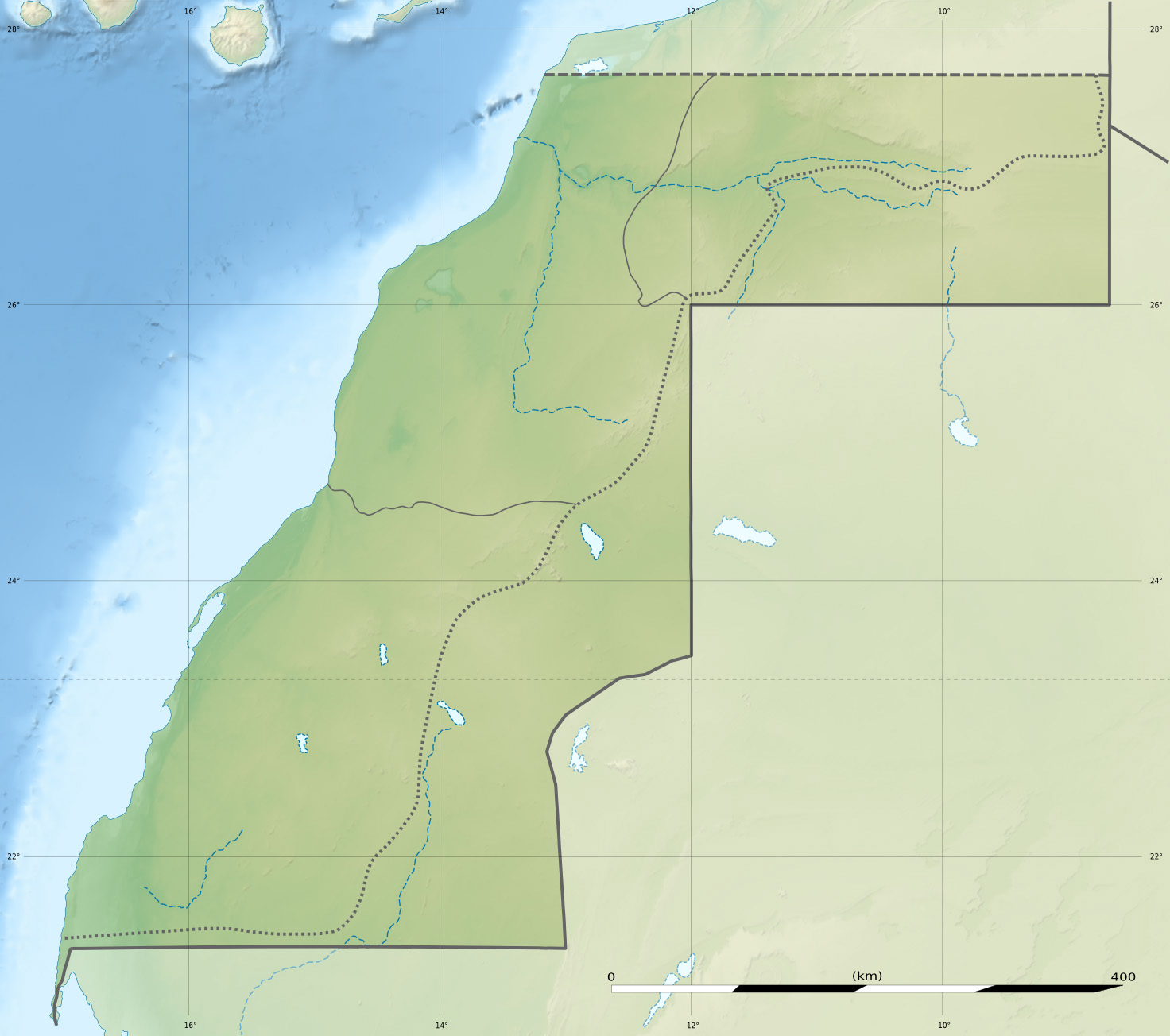
- Location in Western Sahara Dougaj (Africa)
- Coordinates: 22°3′20″N 13°33′10″W
- Territory: Western Sahara
- Claimed by: Kingdom of Morocco, Sahrawi Arab Democratic Republic
- Controlled by: Sahrawi Arab Democratic Republic

Government
  - Type: Municipality
- Elevation: 270 m (890 ft)
- Time zone: UTC+0 (GMT)

Dougaj (Spanish: Duguech) is a region and town situated in the south of Western Sahara of Africa approximately midway between the Agwanit region and the Moroccan Wall, 119 km from Fderik, Mauritania.

Dougaj is located in the part of Western Sahara controlled by the Polisario Front and often referred to as the Free Zone or Liberated Territories. It is the head of the 6th military region of the Sahrawi Arab Democratic Republic, and holds an SPLA military outpost.

== Infrastructure ==
On late June 2012, the Sahrawi Minister of Construction and Urbanization of the Liberated Territories laid the foundation stone of Dougaj's new school.
