= Radio Nacional de la R.A.S.D. =

Radio Nacional de la R.A.S.D. الاذاعة الوطنية للجمهورية العربية الصحراوية الديمقراطية
- Sahrawi Arab Democratic Republic
- Broadcast area: North Africa, Europe, Americas
- Frequency: 1550 kHz - Sahrawi refugee camps

Programming
- Languages: Arabic, Spanish
- Format: News, talk and music

Ownership
- Owner: Polisario Front

History
- First air date: 28 December 1975

Technical information
- Power: 100 kW
- Repeater: 7460 kHz - Bir Lehlou

Links
- Website: www.rasdradio.info

The National Radio of the Sahrawi Arab Democratic Republic (in Arabic: الاذاعة الوطنية للجمهورية العربية الصحراوية الديمقراطية; in Spanish: Radio Nacional de la República Árabe Saharaui Democrática) is the state-owned public radio broadcaster of the Sahrawi Republic.

== Background and establishment ==
"Radio Nacional de la RASD" started broadcasting on 28 December 1975, shortly after the beginning of the Western Sahara War. Previously, some emissions had been made from supportive radio stations in Algiers and Tripoli, as "La Voz del Sáhara Libre" (The Voice of Free Sahara). In the first months of the station and due to the war situation, the first transmissions were made from moving trucks, with very limited airplay.

In 1977 the first studios and archive were inaugurated in the Sahrawi refugee camps, while in late 1978 the power of the station rose to 20 kW, transmitting to all Western Sahara, Morocco, Algeria and part of Mauritania. In 1991 the station upgraded to 100 kW (its actual power), with a transmitting tower of 120 m.
