= Inchaban =

- Location in Ghana
- Coordinates: 4°59′34″N 1°40′53″W
- Country: Ghana
- Region: Western Region (Ghana)

Inchaban is a dormitory town in the Western region of Ghana. It is 21.6 kilometres from the centre Takoradi, the Western regional capital.

== Boundaries ==
The town borders Shama to the east and Aboadze to the west. The Atlantic Ocean lies to the south of the town.
