= Meharrize =

Mehaires: أمهيريز (Arabic); ⵎⵀⵉⵔⵉⵣ (Berber languages); Meharrize
- Municipality and town
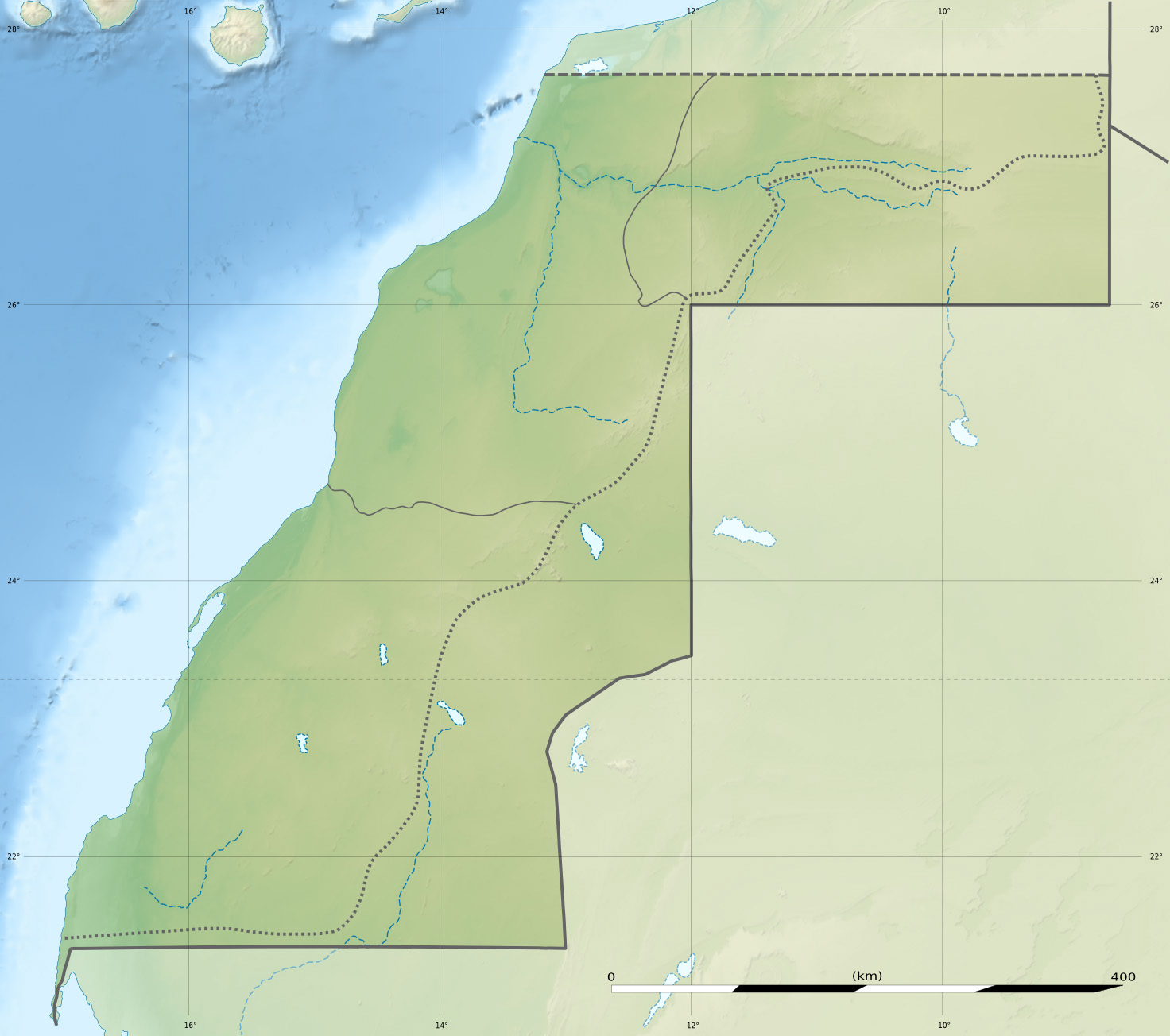
- Location within Western Sahara Location within Africa
- Coordinates: 26°8′50″N 11°4′9″W
- Territory: Western Sahara
- Claimed by: Kingdom of Morocco; Sahrawi Arab Democratic Republic
- Controlled by: Sahrawi Arab Democratic Republic

Government
  - Type: Municipality
- Elevation: 378 m (1,240 ft)
- Time zone: UTC+0 (GMT)

Meharrize (also transliterated Mheiriz, Mehaires; Arabic: أمهيريز, Tamazight: ⵎⵀⵉⵔⵉⵣ) is an oasis located in Western Sahara. It is situated between Tifariti and Amgala, 93 km from Smara, to the east of the Moroccan Wall, and in the Polisario Front-held part of Western Sahara close to the Mauritanian border.

The town has a dispensary, a school, and a mosque and is the headquarters of the 4th military region of the Sahrawi Arab Democratic Republic.

== Infrastructure ==
During late June 2012, the Sahrawi Minister of Construction and Urbanization of the Liberated Territories visited the town to supervise the family farms project and the construction of a school, opened in 2013.

== Politics ==
On June 17, 2007, the Polisario Front celebrated here the 37th anniversary of the Sahrawi uprising in 1970, the Zemla Intifada.

== Culture ==
In August 2008, Mheiriz hosted the III edition of the Summer University, for the Sahrawi students abroad. The students visited the historical archaeological sites in the region and profited from many conferences and lectures on different themes, such as religion, culture and security, in addition to other activities such as film projections and expositions.

== Twin towns - Sister cities ==
- Berantevilla, Álava, Basque Country, Spain
- Carranza, Biscay, Basque Country, Spain
- Firenzuola, Florence, Tuscany, Italy
- Lezama, Biscay, Basque Country, Spain
- Markina, Biscay, Basque Country, Spain
- Soria, Soria, Castilla y León, Spain (since May 8, 2008)
