= Zug, Western Sahara =

Zug زوك Zoug
- Municipality and town
- Location in Western Sahara Zug (Africa)
- Coordinates: 21°36′47″N 14°8′50″W
- Country: Western Sahara
- Claimed by: Morocco, Sahrawi Arab Democratic Republic
- Controlled by: Sahrawi Arab Democratic Republic

Government
  - Type: Municipality
  - Mayor: Nayem Enna Mahayub

Area
  - Total: 47.18 km^{2} (18.22 sq mi)
- Elevation: 212 m (696 ft)

Population (2004)
  - Total: 833
  - Density: 17.7/km^{2} (45.7/sq mi)
- Time zone: UTC+0 (GMT)

Zug (also transliterated "Zoug", "Sug"; Arabic: زوك) is a municipality located in the far south-east of Western Sahara, 170 km. from Atar, Mauritania. The only erg or sand sea in Western Sahara (known as "Galb Azefal") is located nearby, where it runs from south-west to north-east from Mauritania into Western Sahara and back into Mauritania, where the border forms a right angle. Zug is located in the part of Western Sahara that is controlled by the Polisario Front and by them referred to as the Liberated Territories.

It is the head of the 1st military region of the Sahrawi Arab Democratic Republic and holds a SPLA military outpost and a small hospital.

== Infrastructure ==
In June 2009, three friendship associations from Alicante (Spain) had a meeting with Sahrawi ministers, with the intention of building up a hospital in the town. On September, a solidarity concert with Chambao, Oléfunk & Mario Díaz was held in Altea, with the aim to collect money to finance the project. On November, an agreement between POLISARIO representatives and members of the friendship associations to build up the building was signed. In 2011, the construction works had been finished, only lasting the equipment and the medical supplies to open it.

It is the site of a former Spanish Foreign Legion outpost.

== Culture ==
Near Zug there are some Neolithic engravings with geometrical patterns, similar to others found in Chad and southern Morocco.

== Twin towns and sister cities ==
- Agullent, Valencia, Valencian Community, Spain(since December 1998)
- Ajangiz, Biscay, Basque Country, Spain
- Campo nell'Elba, Livorno, Tuscany, Italy
- Cantagallo, Prato, Tuscany, Italy (since September 28, 2001)
- Collesalvetti, Livorno, Tuscany, Italy
- Crespina, Pisa, Tuscany, Italy (since October 2007)
- Denia, Alicante, Valencian Community, Spain (since December 1998)
- Lamporecchio, Pistoia, Tuscany, Italy
- Lemoiz, Biscay, Basque Country, Spain
- Maracena, Granada, Andalucía, Spain
- Medina del Campo, Valladolid, Castilla y León, Spain (since August 10, 2008)
- Plentzia, Biscay, Basque Country, Spain
- Reggello, Florence, Tuscany, Italy
- Rosignano Marittimo, Livorno, Tuscany, Italy (since 1993)
- Torrelavega, Cantabria, Spain (since July 17, 2008)
- Valdemoro, Madrid, Spain (since November 20, 2007)
- Zegama, Gipuzkoa, Basque Country, Spain
- Zierbena, Biscay, Basque Country, Spain
- Zumaia, Gipuzkoa, Basque Country, Spain
