= Agounit =

Agwanit أغوانيت Agüenit Aghoueinit or Aghouinite
- Daerah
- Location in Western Sahara
- Coordinates: 22°11′0″N 13°7′59″W
- UN Non-Self-Governing Territory: Western Sahara
- Controlled by: Sahrawi Arab Democratic Republic
- Claimed by: Morocco

Government
  - Type: Municipality

Area
  - Total: 17.66 km^{2} (6.82 sq mi)
- Elevation: 306 m (1,004 ft)

Population (2004)
  - Total: 222
  - Density: 12.6/km^{2} (32.6/sq mi)
- Time zone: UTC+0 (GMT)

Agounit (also transliterated: Aghouinite, Aghounit, Aghoueinit, Agueinit, Agwenit, Agwanit, Agüenit, Aguanit; Arabic: أغوانيت) is a small town or village in the Río de Oro area of the disputed territory of Western Sahara. It is situated in the Polisario Front-held Free Zone of Western Sahara, under the jurisdiction of the Sahrawi Arab Democratic Republic, and near the Mauritanian border, 72 km (45 mi) south-west from Fderik. It has a hospital, a school and a mosque. It is the head of the 7th military region of the Sahrawi Arab Democratic Republic.

== Infrastructure ==
On 7 June 2006, during the celebrations of the 30th anniversary of the "Day of the Martyr" (commemorating the death in combat of El-Ouali Mustapha Sayed, first president of the SADR), Mohamed Abdelaziz (president of the SADR) inaugurated a hospital (built up with help from the Basque country government), a desalination centre (built with the help of Andalusia government), a school and the Mayoralty of Agwenit.

== Politics ==
In May 2000, the Polisario Front celebrated the 27th anniversary of the beginning of their armed struggle with a military parade in Agounit.

In June 2006 (during the celebrations of the 30th anniversary of the "Day of the Martyr") the town was the host of the annual conference of the Sahrawi communities abroad (Sahrawi diaspora).

== International relations ==
=== Twin towns and sister cities ===
Agounit is twinned with:

- Amurrio, Álava, Basque Country, Spain
- Busturia, Biscay, Basque Country, Spain
- Campiglia Marittima, Livorno, Tuscany, Italy
- Gatika, Biscay, Basque Country, Spain
- Lapuebla de Labarca, Álava, Basque Country, Spain
- Mallabia, Biscay, Basque Country, Spain
- Motril, Granada, Andalucía, Spain
- Poggio a Caiano, Prato, Tuscany, Italy
- Ponsacco, Pisa, Tuscany, Italy
- Portoferraio, Livorno, Tuscany, Italy (since 8 November 2004)
- Puçol, Valencia, Comunidad Valenciana, Spain (since 1 September 2002)
- Quarrata, Pistoia, Tuscany, Italy
- Rignano sull'Arno, Florence, Tuscany, Italy
- Tres Cantos, Madrid, Spain (since 1995)
