= Bir Lehlou =

Bir Lehlou بئر الحلو Bir Leḥlu
- Municipality and town
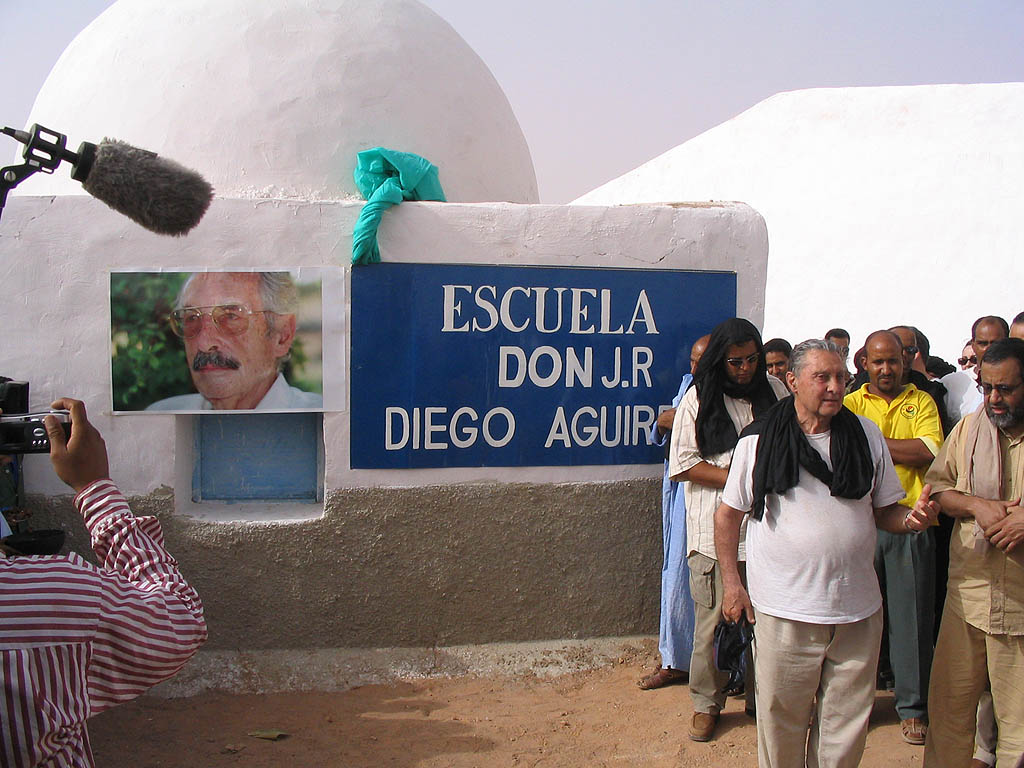
- Inauguration of the school "José Ramón Diego Aguirre" in Bir Lehlou, May 20, 2005

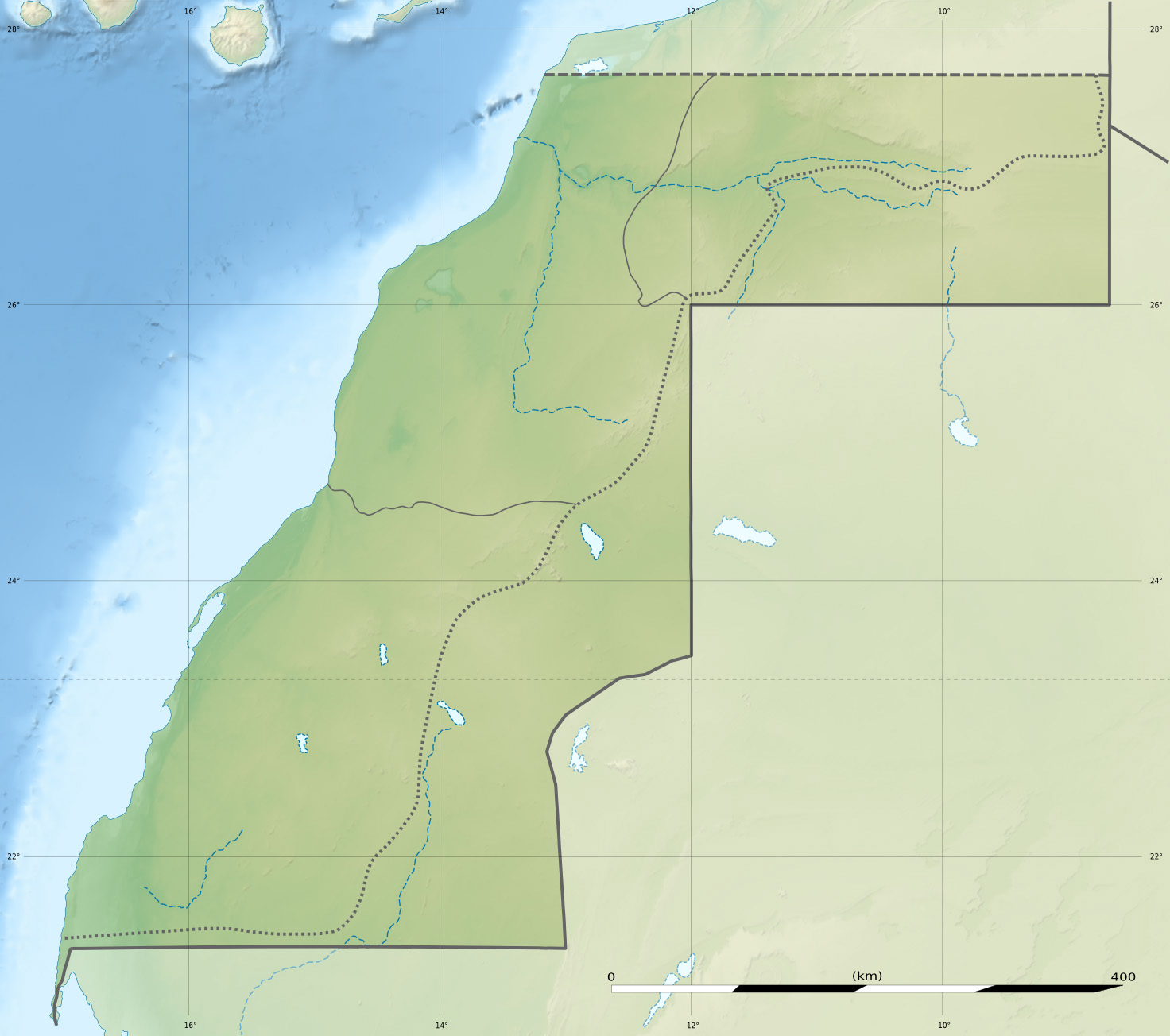
- Location in Western Sahara Bir Lehlou (Africa)
- Coordinates: 26°20′58″N 09°34′32″W
- Territory: Western Sahara
- Claimed by: Kingdom of Morocco (Sahrawi Arab Democratic Republic) Sahrawi Republic
- Controlled by: (Sahrawi Arab Democratic Republic) Sahrawi Republic

Government
  - Type: Municipality
  - Mayor: Abeid Moulud
- Elevation: 475 m (1,558 ft)
- Time zone: UTC+0 (GMT)
- Climate: BWh

Bir Lehlou (also transliterated Bir Lahlou, Bir Lehlu Arabic: بئر الحلو) is an oasis town in north-eastern Western Sahara, 236 km from Smara, near the Mauritanian border and east of the border wall, in Polisario Front-held territory. It has a pharmacy, a school and a mosque. It is the head of the 5th military region of the Sahrawi Arab Democratic Republic and was the factual temporary capital of SADR until Tifariti became the temporary capital in 2008. It is also the name of a Daïra of the Wilaya of Smara, in the Sahrawi refugee camps.

The name "Bir Lehlou" is transcribed from Maghrebi Arabic, and means "the sweet (meaning palatable or non-salty) water well". The Modern Standard Arabic transcription would be "bir al Halū" (بئر الحلو).

== History ==
The Sahrawi Arab Democratic Republic with an exiled government seated earlier in Tindouf, Algeria, administered Bir Lehlou as the temporary capital of the SADR, as long as the Sahrawi capital of El-Aaiun is under Moroccan control. For example, it had been the scenario of reunions of SADR's National Secretariat. This is also from where the republic's existence was proclaimed over radio on the night of February 27, 1976, by its first president, El-Ouali Mustapha Sayed. Some sources list also Bir Lehlou as El-Ouali's birthplace.

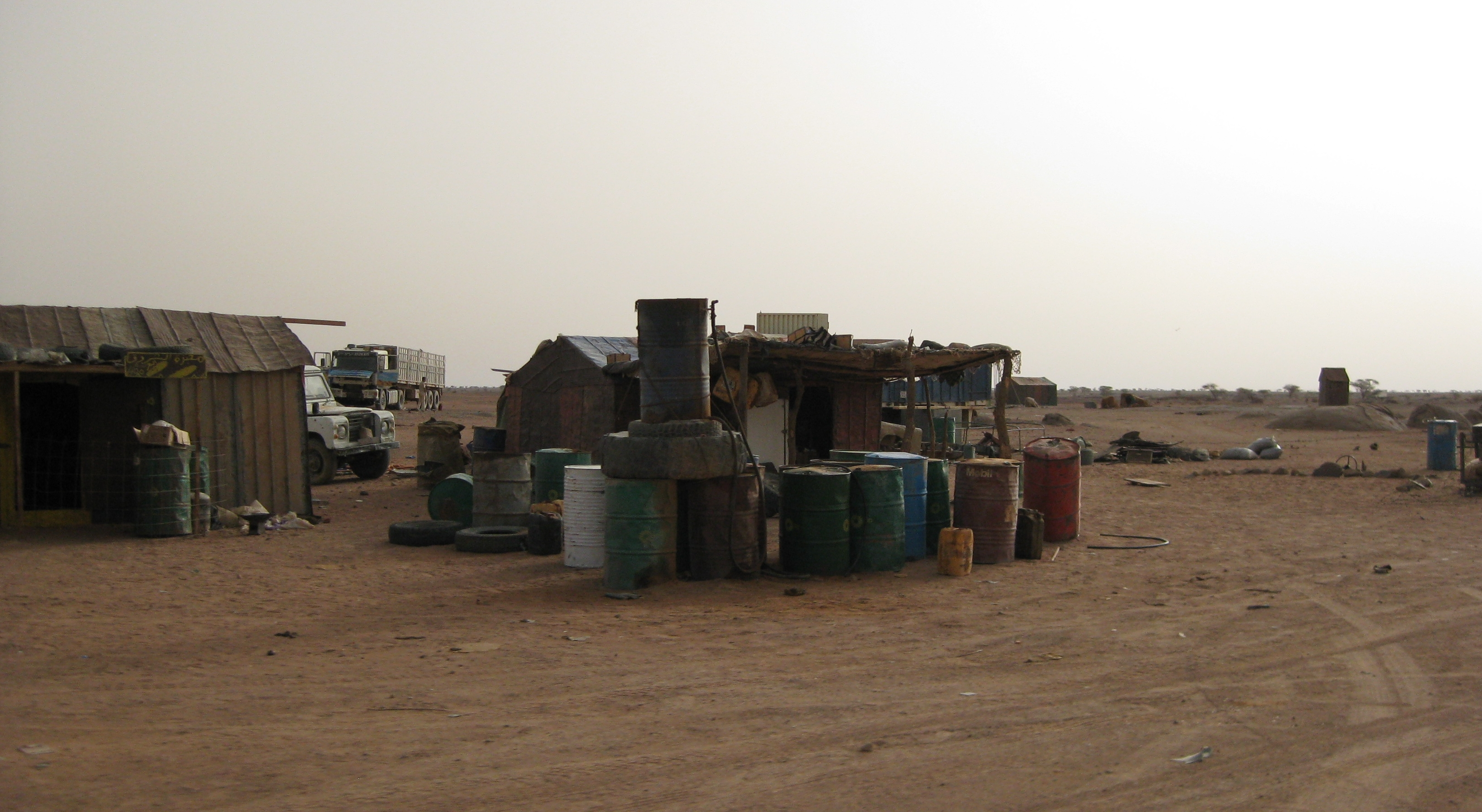
Gas station in Bir Lehlou. August 14, 2011.

Since late 1975, Radio Nacional de la Republica Árabe Saharaui Democrática (National Radio of the SADR) had broadcast from there on both medium and short wave, webcasting the programming in Hassaniya Arabic, and also some hours in Spanish.

On May 20, 2005, coinciding with the 32nd anniversary of the beginning of the armed struggle of the Polisario Front, a primary school was inaugurated in Bir Lehlou. The school was named "José Ramón Diego Aguirre" (Spanish colonel and historian, first foreigner to be awarded with the Sahrawi honorific nationality) in his honour.

On February 27, 2010, Bir Lehlou hosted the 34th anniversary of the proclamation of the SADR, with the presence of several African and South American ambassadors.

On October 12, 2011, during the 36th National Unity Day celebrations, the commander of the Sahrawi 5th military region, Hama Salama, inaugurated an extension of the town's school, as well as a mosque.

=== Climate change ===
A 2019 paper published in PLOS One estimated that under Representative Concentration Pathway 4.5, a "moderate" scenario of climate change where global warming reaches ~2.5–3 °C (4.5–5.4 °F) by 2100, the climate of Bir Lehlou in the year 2050 would most closely resemble the current climate of Kuwait. The annual temperature would increase by 2.1 °C (3.8 °F), and the temperature of the warmest month by 4.2 °C (7.6 °F), while the temperature of the coldest month would increase by 3.9 °C (7.0 °F). According to Climate Action Tracker, the current warming trajectory appears consistent with 2.7 °C (4.9 °F), which closely matches RCP 4.5.

== International relations ==
=== Twin towns and sister cities ===
Bir Lehlou is twinned with:

- Artziniega, Álava, Basque Country, Spain
- Batna, Batna Province, Algeria (since July 8, 2009)
- Benalúa de las Villas, Granada, Andalucía, Spain (since 2001)
- Bientina, Pisa, Tuscany, Italy
- Capraia e Limite, Firenze, Tuscany, Italy
- Campi Bisenzio, Firenze, Tuscany, Italy (since January 28, 1993)
- El Oued, El Oued Province, Algeria (since March 27, 2013)
- Pozuelo de Alarcón, Madrid, Spain (since April 23, 2008)
- Prato, Prato, Tuscany, Italy (since March 19, 1999)
- La Rinconada, Sevilla, Andalucía, Spain
- Montemurlo, Prato, Tuscany, Italy
- Monteroni d'Arbia, Siena, Tuscany, Italy
- Montevarchi, Arezzo, Tuscany, Italy
- Novelda, Alicante, Comunidad Valenciana, Spain (since December 1998)
- San Piero a Sieve, Firenze, Tuscany, Italy
- Sagunto, Valencia, Comunidad Valenciana, Spain (since November 29, 2003)
- Tolosa, Gipuzkoa, Basque Country, Spain (since 1996)
- Tomelloso, Ciudad Real, Castile-La Mancha, Spain (since March 10, 1994)
- Trapagaran, Biscay, Basque Country, Spain
- Vecchiano, Pisa, Tuscany, Italy

== Notable people ==
El-Ouali Mustapha Sayed, Sahrawi nationalist leader, co-founder and second Secretary-General of the Polisario Front and first President of the Sahrawi Arab Democratic Republic.

== See also ==
- List of cities in Western Sahara
- Politics of Western Sahara
- History of Western Sahara
