= Mijek =

Mijek ميجك (Arabic) Miyec (Spanish)
- Municipality and town
- Location in Western Sahara Mijek (Africa)
- Coordinates: 23°26′46″N 12°49′36″W
- Non-self-governing territory: Western Sahara
- Claimed by: Morocco; Sahrawi Republic
- Controlled by: Sahrawi Republic

Government
  - Type: Municipality

Area
  - Total: 21.58 km^{2} (8.33 sq mi)
- Elevation: 280 m (920 ft)

Population (2014)
  - Total: 519
  - Density: 24.1/km^{2} (62.3/sq mi)
- Time zone: UTC+0 (GMT)
- Climate: BWh

Mijek (Note: Also transliterated Mijik or Miyek.) (Arabic: ميجك; Spanish: Miyec) is a small town in the Río de Oro region of Western Sahara. It is located east of the berm, in the Liberated Territories (controlled by the Polisario Front and administered by the Sahrawi Republic), 80 km north of the Mauritanian town of Zouérat and 250 km. east of Dakhla. It has a hospital, and reportedly a school was opened during the 2012–2013 academic year. It is the head of the 3rd military region of the Sahrawi Arab Democratic Republic.

== History ==
The surroundings were the scene of several battles between Sahrawi tribes and the French Army (Battle of Teniamun in late 1931, Battle of Miyec in early 1932).

== Politics ==
On 20 May 2007, the Polisario Front celebrated in Mijek the 34th anniversary of the beginning of its armed struggle. It also hosted the annual conference of the Sahrawi communities abroad (Sahrawi diaspora).

On 12 October 2010, the village hosted the 35th anniversary of the "Day of National Unity", commemorating the Ain Ben Tili conference of 1975, as well as the Sahrawi diaspora conference.

== International relations ==
=== Twin towns and sister cities ===
Mijek is twinned with:

- Ivry-sur-Seine, Val-de-Marne, France (2022)
- Coslada, Madrid, Spain
- Elorrio, Biscay, Basque Country, Spain
- Incisa in Val d'Arno, Florence, Tuscany, Italy
- Llanera, Asturias, Spain (since 1996)
- Marciana Marina, Livorno, Tuscany, Italy
- Mundaka, Biscay, Basque Country, Spain
- Ormaiztegi, Gipuzkoa, Basque Country, Spain
- Oyón-Oion, Álava, Basque Country, Spain
- Peligros, Granada, Andalucía, Spain
- Poggibonsi, Siena, Tuscany, Italy
- Ponte Buggianese, Pistoia, Tuscany, Italy (since 27 January 1996)
- Ugao-Miraballes, Biscay, Basque Country, Spain
- Vaiano, Prato, Tuscany, Italy
