= Holland (disambiguation) =

Holland is a region within the Netherlands.

Holland may also refer to:

== Places ==
=== Netherlands ===
- Holland may refer to the Netherlands as a whole, in informal contexts and sports events
- County of Holland, a historical county in the Holy Roman Empire de facto until 1581, formally until 1795
- Dutch Republic or Republic of the Seven United Provinces, an independent aristocratic Republic from 1579/1581 until 1795, frequently called "Holland" in literature
- Kingdom of Holland, a French vassal state covering roughly the area of the Netherlands during the Napoleonic era (1806–1810)
- North Holland, a province of the Netherlands
- South Holland, a province of the Netherlands

=== Canada ===
- Holland, Manitoba, a city
- Holland Landing, an unincorporated community in Ontario
- Holland River, Ontario

=== Singapore ===
- Holland Village, Singapore, a neighbourhood

=== United Kingdom ===
==== Subdivisions ====
- Parts of Holland, a traditional subdivision of Lincolnshire and former administrative county
- South Holland District, a local government district in Lincolnshire

==== Populated places ====
- Holland-on-Sea, Essex, a town
- Holland, former name of Up Holland, Lancashire
- Holland, Orkney, a settlement on the island of Papa Westray
- Holland, Surrey, a neighbourhood of Oxted
- Great Holland, a village in Essex
- Holland Park, a part of Kensington, London
  - Holland (ward), an electoral ward of Kensington and Chelsea London Borough Council that has existed since the council's creation in 1964
- New Holland, Lincolnshire, a village

=== United States ===
- Holland, Arkansas
- Holland, Georgia
- Holland, Indiana
- Holland, Iowa
- Holland, Kansas
- Holland, Kentucky
- Holland, Massachusetts, a New England town
  - Holland (CDP), Massachusetts, the main village in the town
- Holland, Michigan
- Holland, Minnesota, city in Pipestone County
- Holland, Minneapolis, Minnesota
- Holland, Missouri
- Holland Township, New Jersey, in Hunterdon County
- Holland, Monmouth County, New Jersey
- Holland, New York
- Holland, North Carolina
- Holland, Ohio
- Holland, Pennsylvania
- Holland, Texas
- Holland, Vermont
- Holland, Wisconsin (disambiguation)
- Holland Township, Michigan (disambiguation)
- Holland Township, Minnesota
- South Holland, Illinois

== People ==
- Holland (surname)

=== Middle name ===
- John Holland Rose (1855–1942), English historian
- R. Holland Duell (1824–1891), US congressman from New York
- Charles Holland Duell (1850–1920), American politician and judge

=== Given name ===
- Holland Alphin (1926–1998), American football player
- Holland Andrews (born 1988), American singer, composer, performance artist, and clarinetist
- Holland Coffee (1807–1846), American trader
- Holland Cotter, American writer
- Holland Archer Davis (1869–1955), American engineer
- Holland Hollie Donan (1928–2014), American football player
- Holland S. Duell (1881–1942), New York politician
- Holland W. Hobbiss (1880–1970), English architect
- Holland Nimmons McTyeire (1824–1889), American bishop
- Holland Roden (born 1986), American actress
- Holland Smith (1882–1967), US Marine Corps general
- Holland Taylor (born 1943), American film, stage, and television actress, and playwright
- Holland Thompson (historian) (1873–1940), American historian
- Holland Thompson (politician), American politician
- Holland (singer) (born 1996; Korean: 고태섭), South Korean singer

== Art, entertainment, and media ==
=== Music ===
==== Groups and artists ====
- Holland (singer) (born 1996; Korean: 고태섭), South Korean singer
- Holland, the former name of a rock ‘n’ roll band from Nashville, Tennessee, now known as The Lonely Hearts
- Gollandia (or Gollandiya; Russian: Голландия, lit. 'Holland'), Russian rock/blues band
- Holland–Dozier–Holland, a songwriting and production team

==== Albums ====
- Holland (album), by The Beach Boys

==== Songs ====
- "Holland", by Sufjan Stevens on his album Michigan
- "Holland, 1945", on the In the Aeroplane Over the Sea album by Neutral Milk Hotel

=== Other arts, entertainment, and media ===
- Holland (film), 2025, starring Nicole Kidman and Gael García Bernal
- Holland Doc, a documentary channel of the Netherlands
- Holland Festival, a performing arts festival in the Netherlands
- Holland March, a fictional character from The Nice Guys (2016) played by Ryan Gosling
- Holland Novak, a fictional character from the Eureka Seven anime and manga series

== Brands and enterprises ==
- Holland (publisher), Dutch publishing house
- Holland, a brand of YRC Worldwide
- Holland & Holland, British gun-maker
- Holland & Holland coachbuilders, former London firm of coachbuilders
- Holland, Hannen & Cubitts, a British building firm
- Holland Land Company, an unincorporated syndicate of Dutch investors
- Holland Publishing, UK publishing house
- J A & P Holland, former UK confectionery company, now owned by Elizabeth Shaw Ltd.

== English titles ==
- Baron Holland, an English noble title, now extinct
- Earl of Holland, an English noble title, now extinct
- Holland baronets, four baronetcies created for persons with the surname Holland

== Sports ==
- Holland Dream, basketball team in Holland, Michigan
- Holland F.C., football club in England
- Holland Ladies Tour, women's elite professional road bicycle racing stage race
- Netherlands national football team, also known as Holland

== Structures ==
- Holland Harbor Light, harbor light in Ottawa County, Michigan
- Holland House, built in 1605, one of the first great houses in Kensington, London
- Holland Island Bar Light, U.S. lighthouse

== Submarines and ships ==
A range of prototype and commissioned submarines were designed and built by, or named for, John Philip Holland. The prototypes were designated using the Roman numerals (I–VI). The Holland VI prototype became the USS Holland (SS-1), the first US Navy submarine. The British Royal Navy submarines based on designs by Holland were designated using the Arabic numerals (1–6).

=== Prototype submarines ===
- Holland I (1878)
- Holland II
- Holland III (1883)
- Holland VI (1897–1900) – after trial runs and modifications, this prototype was commissioned in 1900 by the US Navy as USS Holland (SS-1), the US Navy's first submarine

=== Commissioned submarines and ships ===
- USS Holland (SS-1) (1900–1913) – in origin, this craft was launched in 1897 as the Holland VI prototype, and was given the USS Holland designation after it was commissioned in 1900 by the US Navy as its first submarine
- Holland-class submarine, Royal Navy
  - Holland 1 (1901–1913)
  - Holland 2 (1902–1913)
  - Holland 3 (1902–1913)
  - Holland 4 (1902–1914)
  - Holland 5 (1902–1912)
- American Holland-class submarine, a Russian class of submarines
- HNLMS Holland, several Dutch navy ships
- USS Holland, list of ships called USS Holland

== Transportation ==
- Holland America Line, shipping and passenger line
- Holland Arms railway station, UK railway station
- Holland station (Michigan), a railroad station in Holland, Michigan, US
- Holland station (SEPTA), a former railroad station in Holland, Pennsylvania, US
- Holland Tunnel, a highway tunnel under the Hudson River, carrying vehicular traffic over Interstate 78, between Manhattan, New York City and Jersey City, New Jersey

== Other uses ==
- Holland chicken, a breed of chicken originating in the US
- Holland Christian Schools, a private Christian school system in Holland, Michigan
- Holland cloth, a plainwoven linen fabric

== See also ==
- Dutchland (disambiguation)
- Netherlands (disambiguation)
- New Holland (disambiguation)
- Holand (disambiguation)
- Hollands (disambiguation)
- Hollander (disambiguation) (includes Hollaender and Holländer)
- François Hollande
- Hollandaise sauce
- Hollandia (disambiguation)
- Hollond (surname)
