= List of countries with multiple capitals =

Some countries can be considered to have multiple capitals. In some cases, one city is the capital for some purposes, and one or more others are capital for other purposes, without any being considered an official capital in preference to the others. There are also cases where there is a single legally defined capital, but one or more other cities operate as the seat of government of some or all parts of the national government; in these situations, sources may disagree on whether these other cities are considered additional capital cities.

== More than one capital at present ==
Color legend:

Sovereign state
State with limited recognition
Dependent territory

Country	Capital	Details
American Samoa	Pago Pago	Official capital and home to the territorial government.
American Samoa	Fagatogo	Seat of government, where the legislature, High Court and District Court are located.
American Samoa	Utulei	Legislative capital and home to the executive office building of the country.
Benin	Porto-Novo	Official capital.
Benin	Cotonou	Seat of government; de facto administrative capital.
Bolivia	Sucre	Constitutional capital.
Bolivia	La Paz	Seat of government; de facto executive and legislative capital.
Burundi	Gitega	Official political capital.
Burundi	Bujumbura	Economic capital and seat of government.
Eswatini	Mbabane	Administrative capital.
Eswatini	Lobamba	Legislative capital and royal residence.
Honduras	Tegucigalpa	Joint constitutional capital.
Honduras	Comayagüela	Joint constitutional capital.
Ivory Coast	Yamoussoukro	Official capital.
Ivory Coast	Abidjan	De facto administrative capital.
Malaysia	Kuala Lumpur	Constitutional and legislative capital; royal seat.
Malaysia	Putrajaya	De facto administrative and judicial capital.
Montserrat	Plymouth	De jure capital. Abandoned in 1997, following a volcanic eruption. A new capital, Little Bay, is currently under construction.
Montserrat	Brades	De facto capital.
Netherlands	Amsterdam	Capital per constitution.
Netherlands	The Hague	Seat of government.
Palestine (Note: The Palestine Liberation Organization (PLO) declared the establishment of the State of Palestine on November 15, 1988. As of September 2025, the State of Palestine is recognized as a sovereign state by 157 of the 193 member states of the United Nations, or just over 80% of all UN members. It is a non-member observer state at the United Nations since November 2012. This limited status is largely due to the United States, a permanent member of the Security Council with veto power, which has consistently used its veto or threatened to do so to block Palestine’s full membership to UN. The existence of a state of Palestine is recognized by the states that have established bilateral diplomatic relations with it. There is a wide range of views on the legal status of the State of Palestine, both among international states and legal scholars.)	Jerusalem	Proclaimed capital of the country, but with limited recognition. The Palestinian Declaration of Independence proclaims the "establishment of the State of Palestine on our Palestinian territory with its capital Jerusalem (Al-Quds Ash-Sharif)". Israel exercises de facto control over Jerusalem, but neither state's claims to Jerusalem are widely recognized by the international community.
Palestine	Ramallah	De facto capital of the country. It is also the administrative capital where government institutions and foreign representative offices are located.
Philippines	Manila	De jure capital of the country.
Philippines	Metro Manila	De facto capital of the country. While Manila is designated as the country's capital, the seat of government is the National Capital Region, commonly known as "Metro Manila", of which the city of Manila is a part.
South Africa	Pretoria	Administrative and executive capital.
South Africa	Cape Town	Legislative capital.
South Africa	Bloemfontein	Judicial capital.
South Korea	Seoul	Official capital and the primary seat of the National Assembly.
South Korea	Sejong City	De facto administrative capital; since the Sejong Government Complex was finished in 2014, some authorities have moved there from Seoul, making it their primary seat.
Sri Lanka	Sri Jayawardenepura Kotte	Legislative capital.
Sri Lanka	Colombo	Executive, judicial, and commercial capital.
Western Sahara (Note: Western Sahara is recognized by 44 UN member states and South Ossetia. It was proclaimed by the Polisario Front on 27 February 1976, in Bir Lehlou. The Western Sahara government calls the territories under its control the Liberated Territories or the Free Zone. Morocco occupies the rest of the disputed territory, and calls these lands its Southern Provinces. The claimed capital city of Western Sahara is Laayoune, which is also its largest city. Since Western Sahara does not control Laayoune, it has established a temporary capital in Tifariti, although most of the day-to-day administration happens in Rabouni, one of the Sahrawi refugee camps located in Tindouf, Algeria.)	Laayoune	De jure capital of the country due to it being de facto under Morocco's control.
Western Sahara	Rabouni, Tindouf (Note: Rabouni as one of the capitals of Western Sahara is located outside this country, in Tindouf, Algeria.)	De facto capital of the country, and also, one of its capitals-in-exile (along with Tifariti).
Western Sahara	Tifariti	Provisional capital of the country, and also, one of its capitals-in-exile (along with Rabouni).
Yemen	Sanaa	Official and constitutional capital. It is still considered the country's de jure capital due to it being under Houthi control since 2014.
Yemen	Aden	Seat of the Presidential Leadership Council (the internationally recognized government of Yemen) and the country's de facto capital. It is currently claimed by this executive body as the country's provisional capital.

== More than one capital in the past ==
These countries have had two cities that served as administrative capitals at the same time, for various reasons such as war, weather or partition. In some cases, the second capital is considered a temporary capital.

Country	Year(s)	Capitals	Details
British Raj	1858–1947	Kolkata (a.k.a. Calcutta) (1858–1911)	Administrative capital
British Raj	1858–1947	New Delhi (1911–1947)	Administrative capital
British Raj	1858–1947	Shimla (a.k.a. Simla)	Summer capital
Austria-Hungary	1873–1918	Vienna	Cisleithania
Austria-Hungary	1873–1918	Budapest	Kingdom of Hungary
Republic of China	1937–1945	Nanjing (a.k.a. Nanking)	Capital of the Japanese-controlled puppet state
Republic of China	1937–1945	Chongqing	Provisional capital of the Kuomintang-ruled Republic of China
Republic of China	1945–1991	Nanjing	Administrative, legislative, and judicial capital (claimed between the 1949 Retreat and the 1992 Consensus)
Republic of China	1945–1991	Taipei	Provisional capital of the Kuomintang-ruled Republic of China on Taiwan
France	1940–1944	Vichy	De facto administrative capital
France	1940–1944	Paris	De jure constitutional capital, also capital for the German military administration
Kingdom of Italy	1943–1944	Brindisi (1943–Feb 1944)	De facto provisional capital
Kingdom of Italy	1943–1944	Salerno (Feb–Jun 1944)	De facto provisional capital
Kingdom of Italy	1943–1944	Rome	De jure capital until 1944 when it was liberated by the Allies
Italian Social Republic	1943–1944	Salò	De facto capital until 1944 when it became the primary capital
Italian Social Republic	1943–1944	Rome	De jure capital until 1944 when it was liberated by the Allies
Democratic People's Republic of Korea	1948–1972	Seoul	De jure capital, albeit briefly in 1950
Democratic People's Republic of Korea	1948–1972	Pyongyang	Provisional seat of government
Laos	1947–1975	Vientiane	Administrative capital
Laos	1947–1975	Luang Prabang	Royal capital
Libya	1951–1963	Tripoli	One of two official capitals of the Kingdom of Libya, then Bayda became the capital of Libya from 1963 to 1969
Libya	1951–1963	Benghazi	One of two official capitals of the Kingdom of Libya, then Bayda became the capital of Libya from 1963 to 1969
Malawi	1974–1994	Lilongwe	Administrative and judiciary capital
Malawi	1974–1994	Zomba	Legislative capital
Netherlands-Indonesia Union	1948–1956	Amsterdam	Kingdom of the Netherlands
Netherlands-Indonesia Union	1948–1956	Batavia	United States of Indonesia
Norway	1940	Oslo	Official capital
Norway	1940	Hamar	Temporarily one-day capital that seated the parliament
Pakistan	1962–1971	Rawalpindi (1962–14 August 1967)	Seat of the government
Pakistan	1962–1971	Islamabad (14 August 1967–1971)	Seat of the government
Pakistan	1962–1971	Dhaka	The constitutional "second capital" and de jure Legislative capital
Philippines	1948–1976	Quezon City	Official capital
Philippines	1948–1976	Manila	De facto seat of government
Philippines	1901–1976	Baguio	Summer capital (still known as summer capital, outside of political use)
Serbia and Montenegro	2003–2006	Belgrade	Administrative and legislative capital
Serbia and Montenegro	2003–2006	Podgorica	Judicial capital

== See also ==
- List of national capitals - A list of national capitals.
- List of purpose-built national capitals
