= Holland =

Region and former province of the Netherlands

Coordinates: 52.250°N 4.667°E

- North and South Holland (in orange) shown together within the Netherlands
- Country: Netherlands
- Largest settlements: List: Amsterdam (pop. 862,965); Rotterdam (pop. 644,618); The Hague (pop. 537,833); Haarlem (pop. 161,265); Zoetermeer (pop. 124,944); Leiden (pop. 124,899); Dordrecht (pop. 118,654); Alkmaar (pop. 108,558); Delft (pop. 103,163); Alphen aan den Rijn (pop. 110,986)

Area
  - Total: 7,511 km^{2} (2,900 sq mi)
  - Land: 5,476 km^{2} (2,114 sq mi)

Population (1 November 2019)
  - Total: 6,583,534
  - Density: 1,203/km^{2} (3,120/sq mi)
- Demonym: Hollander

GDP
  - Total: €448.623 bn (2023)
- Time zone: UTC+1 (CET)
  - Summer (DST): UTC+2 (CEST)

Holland is a geographical region and former province on the western coast of the Netherlands. From the 10th to the 16th century, Holland proper was a unified political region within the Holy Roman Empire as a county ruled by the counts of Holland. By the 17th century, the province of Holland had risen to become a maritime and economic power, dominating the other provinces of the newly independent Dutch Republic.

The area of the former County of Holland roughly coincides with the two current Dutch provinces of North Holland and South Holland, into which the county was divided, and which together include the Netherlands' three largest cities: the capital city (Amsterdam), the home of Europe's largest port (Rotterdam), and the seat of government (The Hague). Holland has a population of 6,583,534 as of November 2019, and a population density of 1203/km^{2}.

The name Holland has frequently been used to refer to the whole of the country of the Netherlands. This casual usage is commonly accepted in other countries, and is even employed by many Dutch themselves. However, some in the Netherlands (particularly those from regions outside Holland or the Randstad) find it undesirable or misrepresentative to use the term for the whole country. In 2019, the Netherlands officially dropped its support of the term Holland for the whole country, which included a logo redesign that changed "Holland" to "NL".

== Etymology and terminology ==
County of Holland within the Batavian Republic (1795)

=== Etymology ===
The name Holland first appeared in sources for the region around Haarlem, and by 1064 was being used as the name of the entire County of Holland. By the early 12th century, the inhabitants of Holland were called Hollandi in a Latin text. Holland is derived from the Old Dutch term holtlant ('wood-land'). This spelling variation remained in use until around the 14th century, at which time the name stabilised as Holland (alternative spellings at the time were Hollant and Hollandt). A popular but erroneous folk etymology holds that Holland is derived from hol land ('hollow land' in Dutch), purportedly inspired by the low-lying geography of the land.

=== Derivative forms ===
The people of Holland are referred to as "Hollanders" in both Dutch and English, though in English this is now unusual. Today this refers specifically to people from the current provinces of North Holland and South Holland. Strictly speaking, the term "Hollanders" does not refer to people from the other provinces in the Netherlands, but colloquially "Hollanders" is sometimes used in this wider sense.

In English, Dutch refers to the Netherlands as a whole, but there is no commonly used adjective for "Holland". The word "Hollandish" is no longer in common use. "Hollandic" is the name linguists give to the dialect spoken in Holland, and is occasionally also used by historians and when referring to the pre-Napoleonic province.

==== Regional implication in Dutch ====
In regional contexts, Holland, Hollands (adjectival form and the language), or Hollanders (people of Holland) may be colloquially used with the intention of contrasting with other types of Dutch people or forms of the language. By the Flemish (Belgian Dutch-speakers) it is often used to denote the Dutch people and language in the Netherlands. By the southern Dutch people (those living "below the great rivers"; a natural cultural, social, and religious boundary formed by the rivers Rhine and Meuse) it is used to refer to the northern Dutch (those living north of these rivers). The use of the term in this context by the southern Dutch is in a derogatory fashion. In the southern province of Limburg, the term may apply to people and (non-Limburgish) dialects from the other 11 provinces.

=== Holland as pars pro toto ===
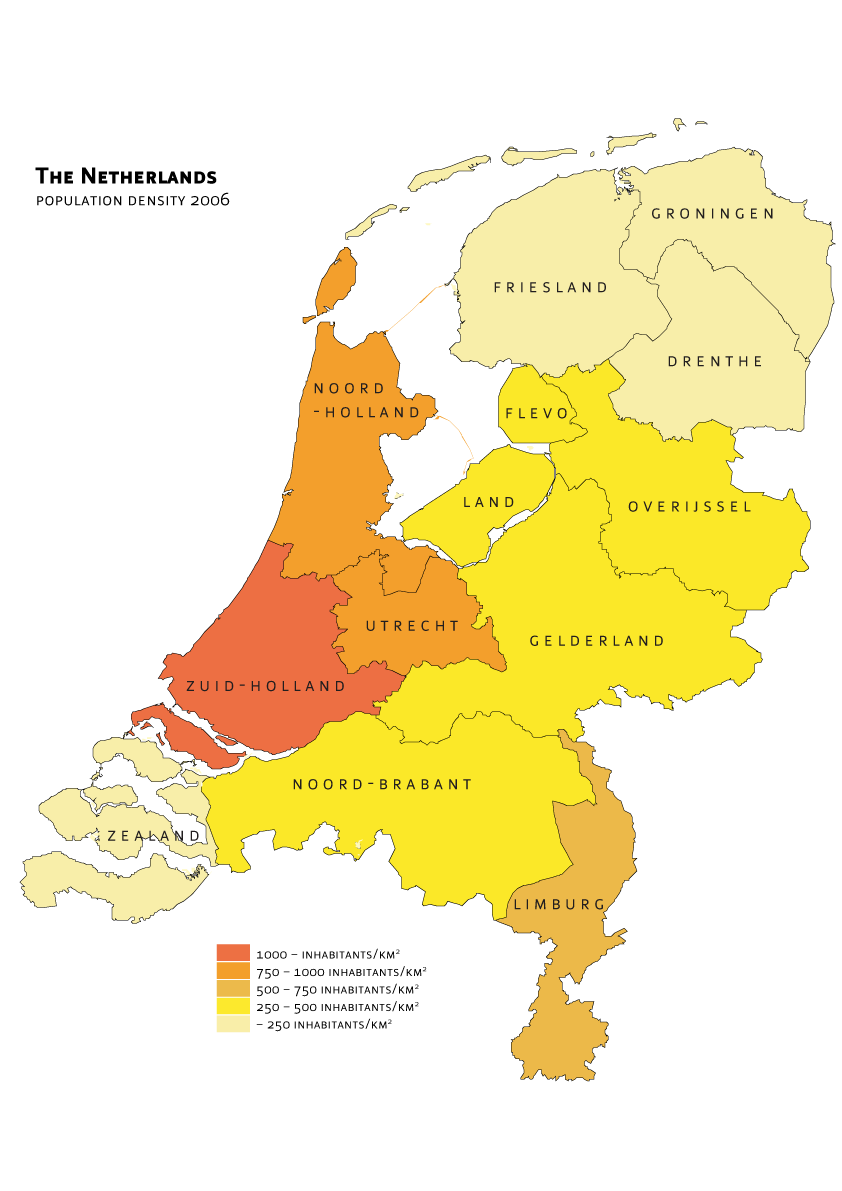
The Netherlands by population density by province (2006)

Historically, "Holland" served as the official national name only between 1806 and 1810, during the Napoleonic Kingdom of Holland; (Note: Between 1806 and 1810 "Holland" was the official name for the country as a whole, after Napoleon made his brother Louis Bonaparte the monarch of the Kingdom of Holland.) otherwise, it has always been a region or county within the historical countries of the Dutch territory. In today's Netherlands, Holland comprises the provinces of North Holland and South Holland, representing two of the country’s twelve provinces, covering about 13% of its national territory and approximately 38% of the Dutch population.

==== 'Hollandocentrism' ====
'Hollandocentrism' refers to the tendency to centre Holland in representations of the Netherlands. This is partly explained by the historical cultural, political, and economic dominance of Holland within the Netherlands, which (inter)nationally became the most influential region of the country and positioned it as the primary point of international contact. This dominant position resulted in the incorrect use of "Holland" as a pars pro toto or synecdoche for the entire country, akin to tendency to refer to the United Kingdom as "England". The practice of referring to the entire country as "Holland" is controversial within the Netherlands. Many Dutch people, particularly those from outside Holland, object to this usage as inaccurate or misrepresentative, drawing parallels to Northern Irish, Welsh or Scottish objections when the UK is referred to as England.

The predominance of Holland has fostered regionalist sentiments among other provinces, which perceive Holland as a threat to their local culture and identity. Holland and its inhabitants are often associated with strong, frequently negative stereotypes, to whom certain qualities are ascribed within a mental geography, a conceptual mapping of spaces and their inhabitants. Conversely, some Hollanders take their region's cultural centrality for granted, treating "Holland" and "the Netherlands" as interchangeable and identifying primarily as Dutch rather than specifically as Hollanders, excluding the majority of the Dutch citizens in this definition. The phenomenon known as hollandocentrism encompasses both the perspective and the broader cultural dominance of Holland.

In 2009, members of the Senate stated that "if in addition to Holland a recognisable translation of the Netherlands does exist in a foreign language, it should be regarded as the best translation" and that "the Kingdom of the Netherlands has a right to use the translation it thinks best, certainly on official [Dutch] documents". Since 2019, the Dutch government has officially favoured "the Netherlands" in all international communications. They stated: "It has been agreed that the Netherlands, the official name of our country, should preferably be used."

==== Official exonym ====
Whilst "Holland" has been replaced in English as the official name for the country of the Netherlands, several other languages still use it, or a calque of it, as the official contemporary terminology to refer to the Netherlands. This is predominantly the case in Southeast Asia, (Note: In Thai ฮอลแลนด์ is considered as another name for the Netherlands, also found in the name of Baan Hollanda)) but can for example be seen in:

- Acehnese: Blanda
- Banjar: Walanda
- Banyumasan: Landa
- Danish: Holland
- Javanese: Walanda
- Malay (including Indonesian and Malaysian standards): Belanda
- Minangkabau: Balando
- Khmer: ហុល្លង់
- Greek: Ολλανδία

== History ==
Initially, Holland was a remote corner of the Holy Roman Empire. Gradually, its regional importance increased until it began to have a decisive, and ultimately dominant, influence on the History of the Netherlands.

=== County of Holland ===
Historical coat of arms of the County of Holland

Until the start of the 12th century, the inhabitants of the area that became Holland were known as Frisians. The area was initially part of Frisia. At the end of the 9th century, West-Frisia became a separate county in the Holy Roman Empire. The first count known about with certainty was Dirk I, who ruled from 896 to 931. He was succeeded by a long line of counts in the House of Holland (who were in fact known as counts of Frisia until 1101). When John I died childless in 1299, the county was inherited by Count John II of Hainaut. By the time of William V (House of Wittelsbach; 1354–1388) the count of Holland was also the count of Hainaut and Zealand.

After the St. Lucia's flood in 1287 the part of Frisia west of the later Zuiderzee, West Friesland, was conquered. As a result, most provincial institutions, including the States of Holland and West Frisia, would for more than five centuries refer to "Holland and West Frisia" as a unit. The Hook and Cod wars started around this time and ended when the countess of Holland, Jacoba or Jacqueline was forced to cede Holland to the Burgundian Philip III, known as Philip the Good, in 1432.

In 1432, Holland became part of the Burgundian Netherlands and since 1477 of the Habsburg Seventeen Provinces. In the 16th century the county became the most densely urbanised region in Europe, with the majority of the population living in cities. Within the Burgundian Netherlands, Holland was the dominant province in the north; the political influence of Holland largely determined the extent of Burgundian dominion in that area. The last count of Holland was Philip III, better known as Philip II, king of Spain. He was deposed in 1581 by the Act of Abjuration, although the kings of Spain continued to carry the titular appellation of Count of Holland until the Peace of Münster signed in 1648.

=== Dutch Republic ===
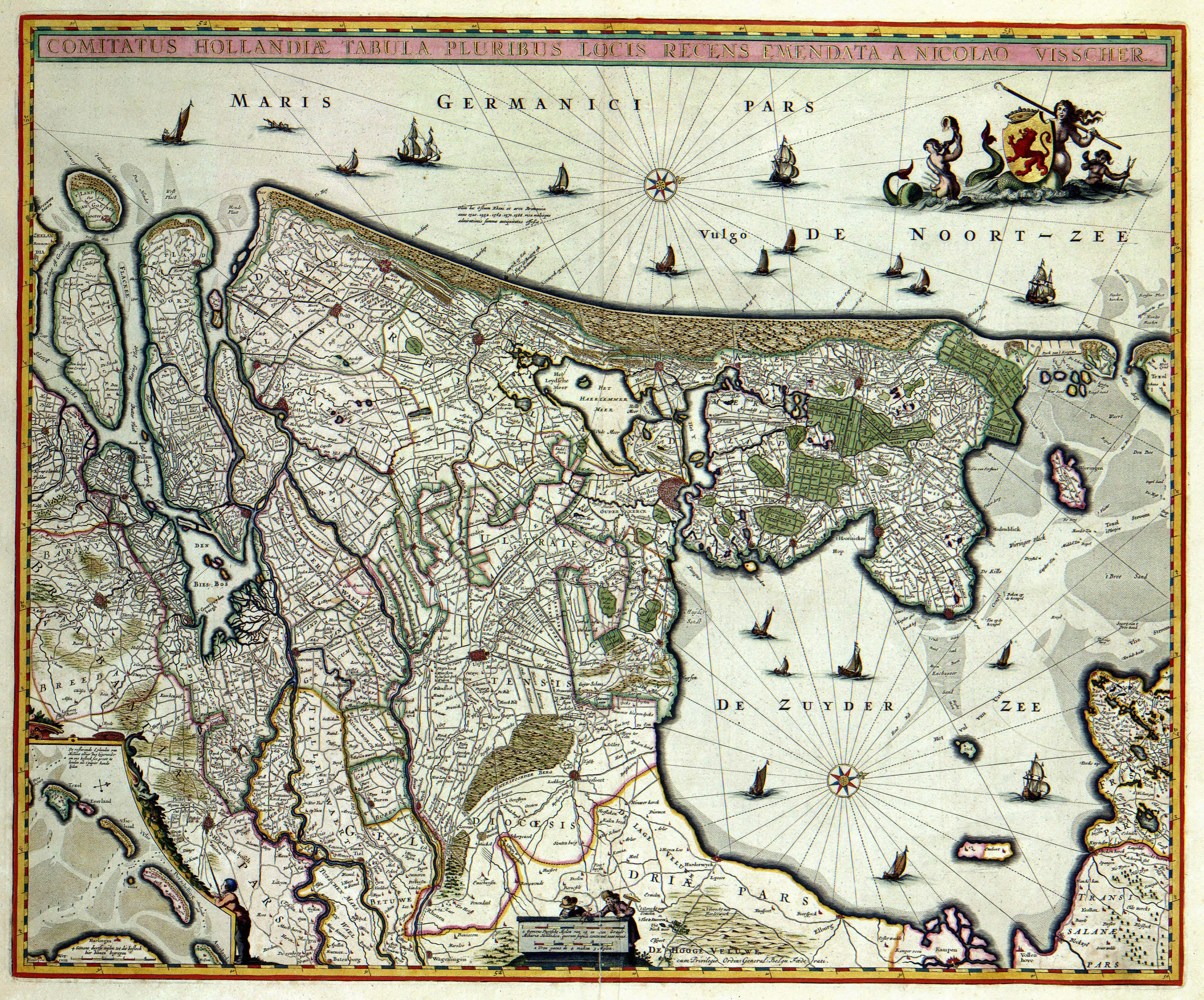
A map of Holland (1682)

In the Dutch Rebellion against the Habsburgs during the Eighty Years' War, the naval forces of the rebels, the Watergeuzen, established their first permanent base in 1572 in the town of Brill. In this way, Holland, now a sovereign state in a larger Dutch confederation, became the centre of the rebellion. It became the cultural, political and economic centre of the United Provinces (Dutch: Verenigde Provinciën), in the 17th century, the Dutch Golden Age, the wealthiest nation in the world. After the King of Spain was deposed as the count of Holland, the executive and legislative power rested with the States of Holland, which was led by a political figure who held the office of Grand Pensionary.

The largest cities in the Dutch Republic were in the province of Holland, such as Amsterdam, Rotterdam, Leiden, Alkmaar, The Hague, Delft, Dordrecht, and Haarlem. From the great ports of Holland, Hollandic merchants sailed to and from destinations all over Europe, and merchants from all over Europe gathered to trade in the warehouses of Amsterdam and other trading cities of Holland.

Many Europeans thought of the United Provinces first as Holland rather than as the Republic of the Seven United Provinces of the Netherlands. A strong impression of Holland was planted in the minds of other Europeans, which then was projected back onto the Republic as a whole. Within the provinces themselves, a gradual slow process of cultural expansion took place, leading to a "Hollandification" of the other provinces and a more uniform culture for the whole of the Republic. The dialect of urban Holland became the standard language.

=== Under French rule ===
Departments of the northern French Empire (1811)

The formation of the Batavian Republic, inspired by the French Revolution, led to a more centralised government. Holland became a province of a unitary state. Its independence was further reduced by an administrative reform in 1798, in which its territory was divided into several departments called Amstel, Delf, Texel, and part of Schelde en Maas.

From 1806 to 1810, Napoleon styled his vassal state, governed by his brother Louis Napoleon and shortly by the son of Louis, Napoleon Louis Bonaparte, as the "Kingdom of Holland". This kingdom encompassed much of what would become the modern Netherlands. The name reflects how natural at the time it had become to equate Holland with the non-Belgian Netherlands as a whole.

During the period when the Low Countries were annexed by the French Empire and actually incorporated into France (from 1810 to 1813), Holland was divided into départements Zuyderzée, and Bouches-de-la-Meuse. From 1811 to 1813, Charles-François Lebrun, duc de Plaisance served as governor-general. He was assisted by Antoine de Celles, Goswin de Stassart and François Jean-Baptiste d'Alphonse. In 1813, Dutch dignitaries proclaimed the Sovereign Principality of the United Netherlands.

=== Kingdom of the Netherlands ===
In 1815, Holland was restored as a province of the United Kingdom of the Netherlands. Holland was divided into the present provinces North Holland and South Holland in 1840, after the Belgian Revolution of 1830. This reflected a historical division of Holland along the IJ into a Southern Quarter (Zuiderkwartier) and a Northern Quarter (Noorderkwartier), but the present division is different from the old division. From 1850, a strong process of nation formation took place, the Netherlands being culturally unified and economically integrated by a modernisation process, with the cities of Holland as its centre.

== Geography ==
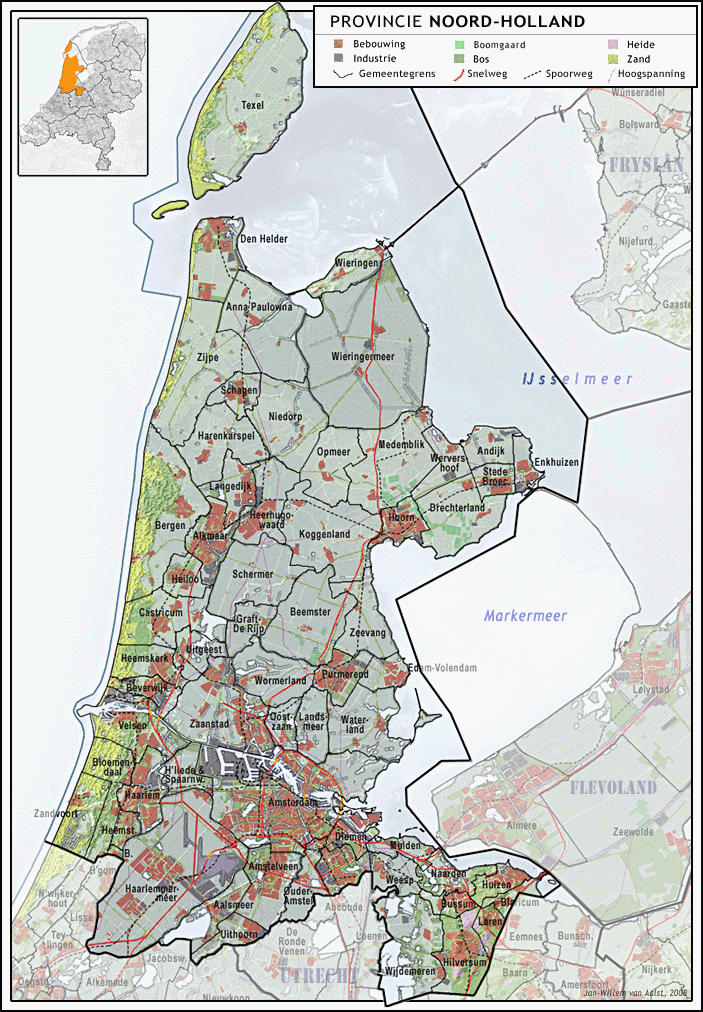
North Holland

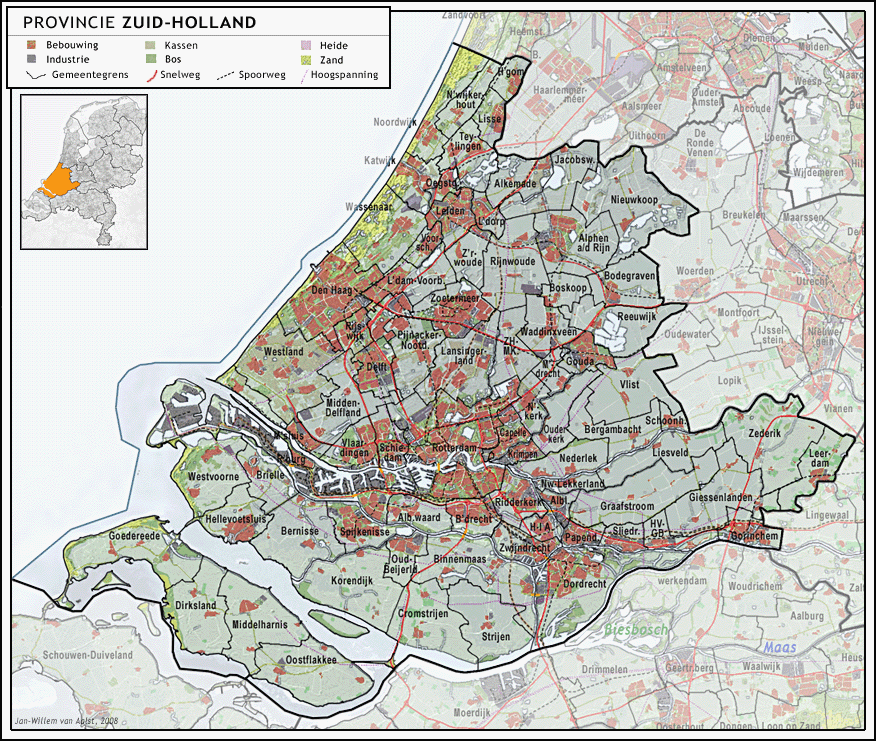
South Holland

Holland is located in the west of the Netherlands. A maritime region, Holland lies on the North Sea at the mouths of the Rhine and the Meuse. It contains numerous rivers and lakes, and has an extensive inland canal and waterway system. To the south is Zealand. The region is bordered on the east by the IJsselmeer and four Dutch provinces.

Holland is protected from the sea by a long line of coastal dunes. The highest point in Holland, about 55 metres (180 ft) above sea level, is in the Schoorlse Duinen ('Schoorl Dunes'). Most of the land area behind the dunes consists of polder landscape lying well below sea level. At present the lowest point in Holland is a polder near Rotterdam, which is about 7 m (23 ft) below sea level. Continuous drainage is necessary to keep Holland from flooding. In earlier centuries, windmills were used for this task. The landscape was (and in places still is) dotted with windmills, which have become a symbol of Holland.

Holland is 7,494 km^{2} (2,893 sq mi), land and water included, making it roughly 13% of the area of the Netherlands. Looking at land alone, it is 5,488 km^{2} (2,119 sq mi) in area. The combined population was 6.5 million in 2018.

The main cities in Holland are Amsterdam, Rotterdam and The Hague. Amsterdam is formally the capital of the Netherlands and its largest city. The Port of Rotterdam is Europe's largest and most important harbour and port. The Hague is the seat of government of the Netherlands. These cities, combined with Utrecht and other smaller municipalities, effectively form a single metroplex—a conurbation called Randstad.

The Randstad area is one of the most densely populated regions of Europe, but still relatively free of urban sprawl. There are strict zoning laws. Population pressures are enormous, property values are high, and new housing is constantly under development on the edges of the built-up areas. Nevertheless, much of the province still has a rural character. The remaining agricultural land and natural areas are highly valued and protected. Most of the arable land is used for intensive agriculture, including horticulture and greenhouse agri-businesses.

=== Reclamation of the land ===
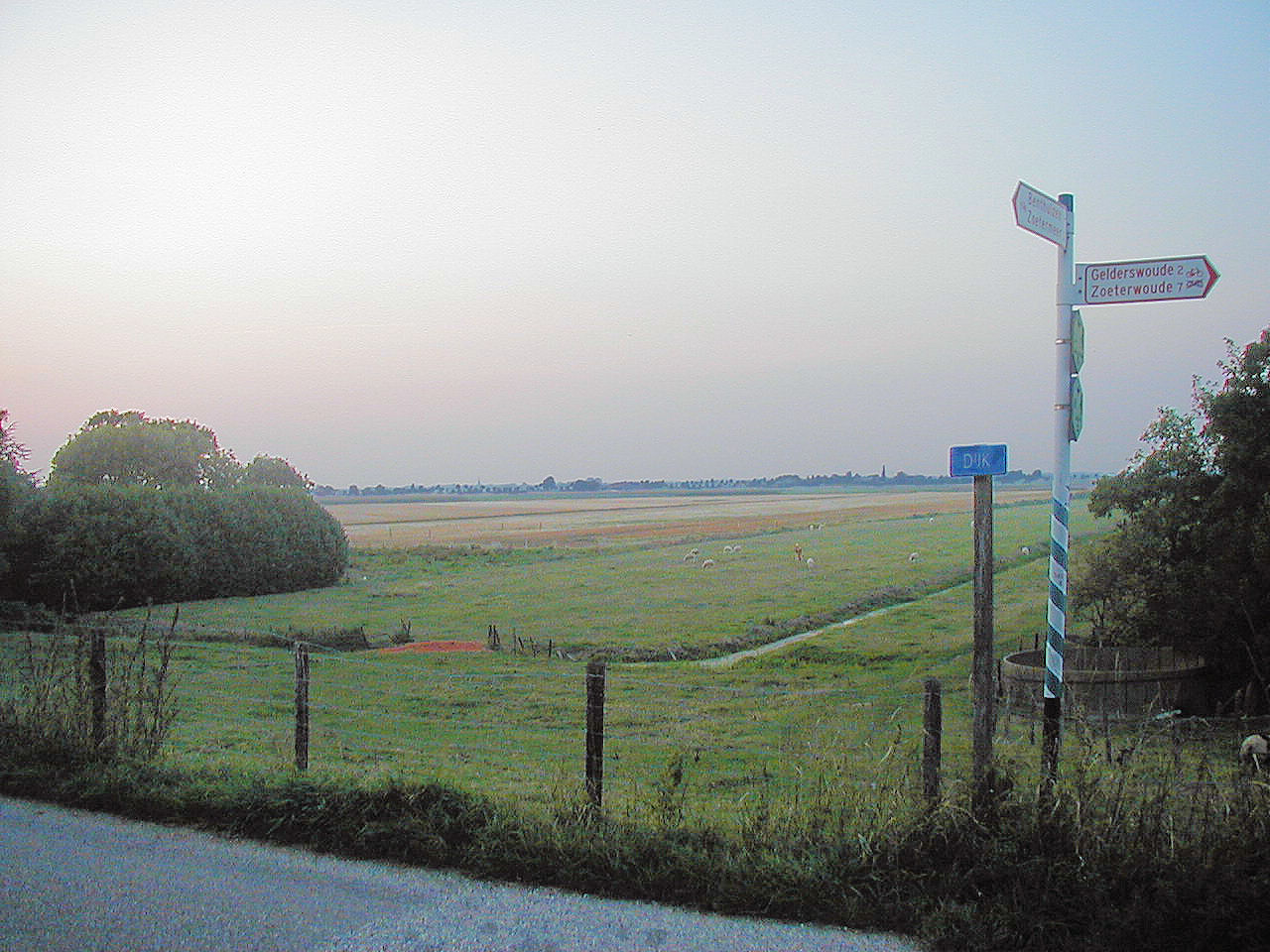
Benthuizen polder, as seen from a dike

The land that is now Holland has not been geographically "stable" since prehistoric times. The western coastline shifted up to 30 kilometres (19 miles) to the east and storm surges regularly broke through the row of coastal dunes. The Frisian Islands, originally joined to the mainland, became detached islands in the north. The main rivers, the Rhine and the Meuse, flooded regularly and changed course repeatedly and dramatically.

The people of Holland found themselves living in an unstable, watery environment. Behind the dunes on the coast of the Netherlands a high peat plateau had grown, forming a natural protection against the sea. Much of the area was marsh and bog. By the tenth century the inhabitants set about cultivating this land by draining it. However, the drainage resulted in extreme soil shrinkage, lowering the surface of the land by up to 15 metres (49 feet).

To the south of Holland, in Zeeland, and to the north, in Frisia, this development led to catastrophic storm floods literally washing away entire regions, as the peat layer disintegrated or became detached and was carried away by the flood water. From the Frisian side the sea even flooded the area to the east, gradually hollowing Holland out from behind and forming the Zuiderzee (present-day IJsselmeer). This inland sea threatened to link up with the "drowned lands" of Zeeland in the south, reducing Holland to a series of narrow dune barrier islands in front of a lagoon. Only drastic administrative intervention saved the county from utter destruction. The counts and large monasteries took the lead in these efforts, building the first heavy emergency dikes to bolster critical points. Later special autonomous administrative bodies were formed, the waterschappen ('water control boards'), which had the legal power to enforce their regulations and decisions on water management. They eventually constructed an extensive dike system that covered the coastline and the polders, thus protecting the land from further incursions by the sea.

Hollanders began land reclamation projects around the 16th century, converting lakes, marshy areas and adjoining mudflats into polders. This continued well into the 20th century. As a result, historical maps of mediaeval and early modern Holland bear little resemblance to present maps.

== Culture ==
The stereotypical image of Holland is a contrived amalgam of tulips, windmills, clogs, Edam cheese, and the traditional dress (klederdracht) of the village of Volendam, far from the reality of everyday Holland. These stereotypes were deliberately created in the late 19th century by official "Holland Promotion" to attract tourists.

=== Languages ===
The predominant language spoken in Holland is Dutch. Hollanders sometimes call the Dutch language "Hollands," instead of the standard term Nederlands. Inhabitants of Belgium and other provinces of the Netherlands use "Hollands" to mean a Hollandic dialect or strong accent.

Standard Dutch was historically largely based on the dialect of the County of Holland, incorporating many traits derived from the dialects of the previously more powerful Duchy of Brabant and County of Flanders. Strong dialectal variation still exists throughout the Low Countries. Today, Holland proper is the region where the original dialects are least spoken, in many areas having been completely replaced by standard Dutch, and the Randstad has the largest influence on the developments of the standard language—with the exception of the Dutch spoken in Belgium.

Despite this correspondence between standard Dutch and the Dutch spoken in the Randstad, there are local variations within Holland itself that differ from standard Dutch. The main cities each have their own modern urban dialect, that can be considered a sociolect. Some people, especially in the area north of Amsterdam, still speak the original dialect of the county, Hollandic. This dialect is present in the north: Volendam and Marken and the area around there, West Friesland and the Zaanstreek; and in a southeastern fringe bordering the provinces of North Brabant and Utrecht. In the south on the island of Goeree-Overflakkee, Zeelandic is spoken.

== Legacy ==
=== New Holland ===
The former County of Holland gave its name to a number of colonial settlements and regions that were called Nieuw Holland or New Holland.

The largest was the island continent presently known as Australia. New Holland was first applied to Australia in 1644 by the Dutch seafarer Dirk Hartog in the Latinised form Nova Hollandia, and remained in international use for 190 years. New Zealand was likewise named after the then usual English spelling for the County of Zeeland (now the province of Zeeland), after an exploratory voyage led by the Dutch explorer Abel Tasman landed there. In the Netherlands, Nieuw Holland would remain the common name of the island continent until the end of the 19th century, with the present-day Dutch name being Australië.

In the Americas, New Holland (present-day northeast coast of Brazil) was a 17th-century colonial territory of the Dutch West India Company, and later that same century the name New Holland was also given to a colony in northeastern North America.
