= Holandia =

Holandia may refer to:

- Holandia, Pomeranian Voivodeship, a settlement in Poland
- Holandia, the Polish name of The Netherlands
- Anopinella holandia, a species of moth of the family Tortricidae

== See also ==
- Hollandia (disambiguation)
- Holand (disambiguation)
