= Hollandia =

Hollandia may refer to:

- HVV Hollandia, Dutch football team
- Hollandia Victoria Combinatie, defunct Dutch football team
- Hollandia (1742 ship), a ship of the Dutch East India Company, wrecked in 1743 on her maiden voyage
- Jayapura, a city in Indonesia, known as Hollandia from 1910 to 1962

- Sentani Airport, the city's airport, formerly known as Hollandia Airfield Complex
- Battle of Hollandia, 1944 battle between American and Japanese forces during World War II

- Landing at Hollandia, a battle of the Western New Guinea campaign of World War II in April 1944
- Naval Base Hollandia, a United States Navy base built during World War II
- Hollandia Hut, Swiss Alpine Club hut
- Hollandia Roeiclub, Dutch rowing club
- Hollandia (moth)
- Hollandia beer, Dutch lager made by Bavaria Brewery (Netherlands)

== See also ==
- Holandia (disambiguation)
- Holland (disambiguation)
