= Holand =

Holand may refer to:

== Places ==
- Holand, Trøndelag, a village in Lierne municipality, Trøndelag, Norway
- Holand, Sortland, a village in Sortland municipality, Nordland, Norway
- Holand, Vega, a village in Vega municipality, Nordland, Norway

== People ==
- Hjalmar Holand, an American historian and author
- Johan E. Holand, a Norwegian journalist and politician
- Lisbeth Holand, a Norwegian politician for the Socialist Left Party
- Otho Holand, an English soldier and a founder Knight of the Garter

== Other ==
- Baron Holand, an English title

== See also ==
- Høland, a former municipality in Akershus county, Norway
- Holland, a region and former province on the western coast of the Netherlands
- Holland (disambiguation)
- Holandia (disambiguation)
