= Capital of Jammu and Kashmir =

Capital of Jammu and Kashmir may refer to:

- Jammu, winter capital of Jammu and Kashmir
- Srinagar, summer capital of Jammu and Kashmir
