= Holland Township, Michigan =

Holland Township is the name of some places in the U.S. state of Michigan:

- Holland Township, Missaukee County, Michigan
- Holland Charter Township, Michigan in Ottawa County, Michigan

== See also ==
- Holland Township (disambiguation)
