= Seat of government =

Place from which a governmental entity exercises its authority

A seat of government is a "building, complex of buildings or the city from which a government exercises its authority". When referring to a city, the seat of government is generally the capital of the state or administrative entity in question, although there are exceptions. Particular terms for the seat of certain territorial subdivisions are administrative centre, county seat (common in the United States), county town (United Kingdom and Ireland), or barrio-pueblo (Puerto Rico), among others or Peterborough; buildings that may function as seats of government include official residences, supreme court buildings, city or town halls, administrative or executive buildings, shire or county halls, legislative buildings, and barangay halls.

== National seats of government ==
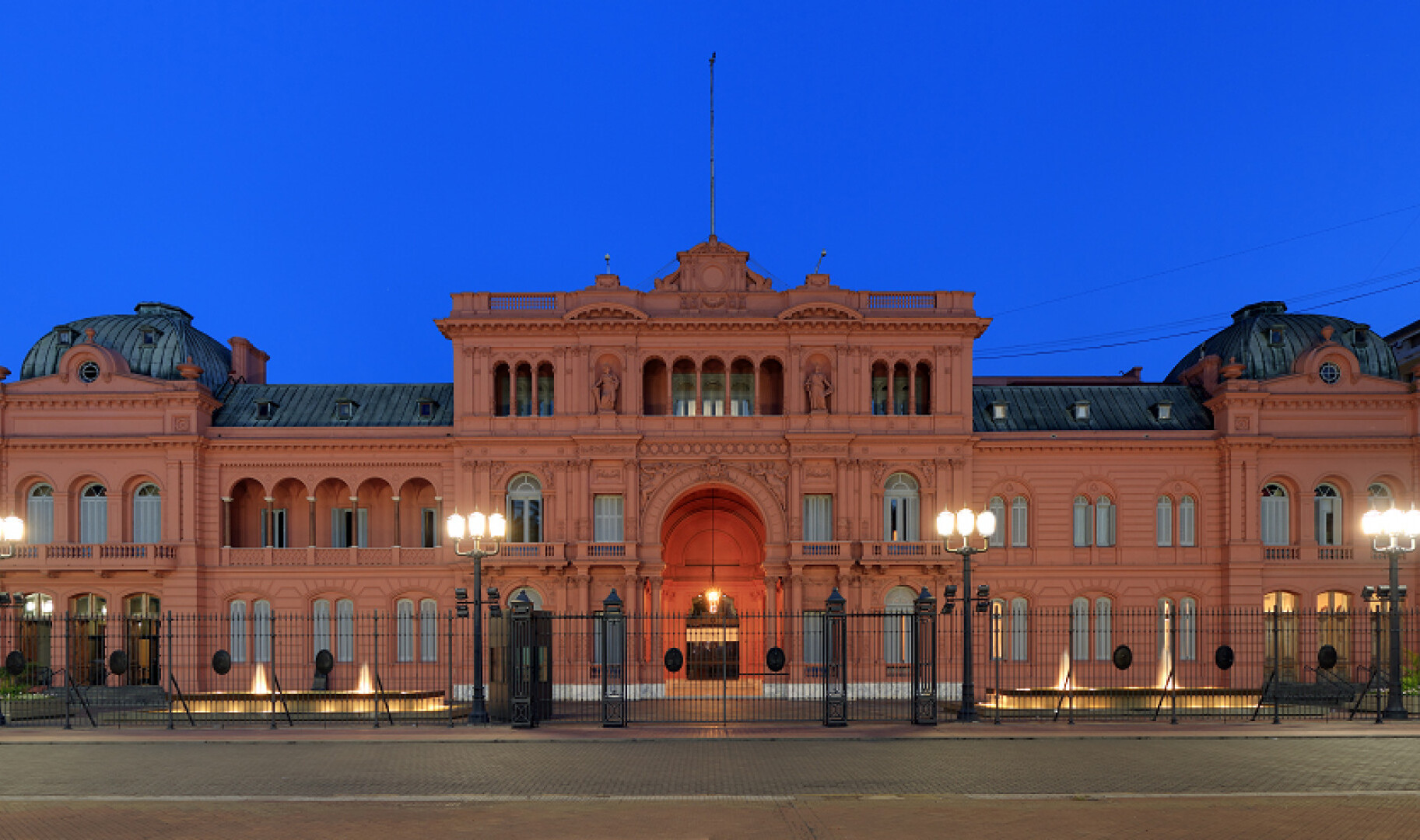
Casa Rosada (Executive Seat) in Buenos Aires, Argentina.

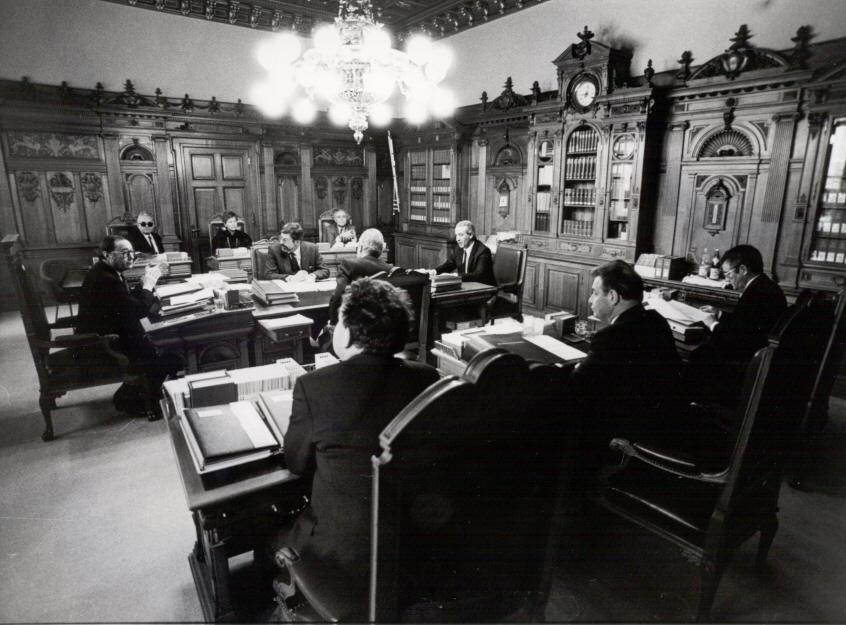
Meeting room of the Swiss government (1987).

Examples of seats of national government include:

- Canada: the city of Ottawa is the seat of government of Canada.
- India: Three sites in Raisina Hill, New Delhi: the Parliament House (legislative seat), the Rashtrapati Bhavan, Seva Teerth (executive seat), Supreme Court of India (judicial seat).
- Philippines: Four buildings in National Capital Region (NCR)/Metro Manila, Philippines: the GSIS Building in Pasay (Senate of the Philippines) and Batasang Pambansa Complex in Quezon City: House of Representatives of the Philippines (legislative seat), the Malacañang Palace (executive seat), and Supreme Court of the Philippines (judicial seat) in Manila.
- United Kingdom: Three sites in London: the Palace of Westminster (legislative seat), 10 Downing Street (executive seat), and Middlesex Guildhall (judicial seat).
- United States: the US Constitution provides that the federal district shall be the seat of government of the United States. The District of Columbia was established under this section.

=== List of seats of country government which are not country capitals ===
There are several countries where, for various reasons, the official capital and de facto seat of government are separated:

- Benin: Porto-Novo is the official capital, but Cotonou is the seat of government.
- Bolivia: Sucre is the constitutional capital, and the supreme tribunal of justice is located in Sucre, making it the judicial capital. The Palacio Quemado, the national congress and national electoral court are located in La Paz, making it the seat of government.
- Eswatini (Swaziland): Lobamba is the traditional, spiritual, and legislative capital city of Eswatini, seat of the Parliament, while the capital is Mbabane.
- Israel and Palestine: Jerusalem is considered by Israel to be the national capital since 1950 but was fully declared the undivided capital of the nation from 1980 according to the Jerusalem Law, though most government offices are located in West Jerusalem. This move is not recognized by the international community and thus the vast majority of embassies are located in Tel Aviv. In addition, the State of Palestine also declares East Jerusalem or the entirety of Jerusalem as its capital but the seat of government resides in Ramallah as does the Palestinian National Authority. (For more details see: Status of Jerusalem.)
- Ivory Coast: Yamoussoukro was designated the national capital in 1983, but most government offices and embassies are still located in Abidjan.
- Malaysia: Putrajaya is the federal administrative centre of Malaysia. The seat of government was shifted in 1999 from Kuala Lumpur to Putrajaya because of overcrowding and congestion in the former.
- Montserrat: Its official capital is Plymouth, but it was permanently abandoned in 1997 after it was completely destroyed by the eruptions of the Soufrière Hills volcano. Since 1998 the de facto capital is Brades. The move was initially intended to be temporary, but it has remained the island's de facto capital ever since. Several names have been suggested for the new official capital now being constructed in the Little Bay area.
- Netherlands: Amsterdam is the constitutional national capital even though the Dutch government, the parliament, the supreme court, the Council of State, and the work palace of the King are all located in The Hague, as are almost all the embassies. (For more details see: Capital of the Netherlands.)
- Sri Lanka: Sri Jayawardenepura Kotte, commonly known as Kotte is the official administrative capital of Sri Lanka. It is a satellite city of and located within the urban area of Sri Lanka's de facto economic and legislative capital, Colombo.
- Tanzania: Until 1974, Dar es Salaam served as Tanzania's capital city, at which point the capital city commenced transferring to Dodoma, by order of then-president Julius Nyerere, which was officially completed in 1996. However, as of 2018, it remained focus of central government bureaucracy, although this is in the process of fully moving to Dodoma.

=== Countries with no official capital ===
- Nauru: Yaren District (in earlier times Makwa/Moqua), is the de facto capital of Nauru; the republic does not have an official capital.
- Switzerland: As of 2026, no Swiss city holds an official status of national capital. In 1848, the Federal Assembly voted to locate the seat of government in Bern, but no official status was granted to the city. The city has since been informally referred to as "Federal City".
- Republic of China (Taiwan): Since 7 December 1949, Taipei has been the provisional capital and the seat of government of the Republic of China after losing the Chinese Civil War. Although Nanjing had been claimed as the nominal capital of the country, its claims were downplayed in the 1990s.

=== Historical examples ===
- Federal Republic of Germany: Since German reunification in 1990 at the end of the Cold War and until 1999, Berlin was its capital and Bonn was the seat of government. However, the Berlin-Bonn Act specifies that many federal government institutions are to maintain a seat in Bonn indefinitely. Prior to reunification, the question as to what was the de jure capital was complicated by questions regarding the status of Berlin.
- Kingdom of England: The traditional capital was the City of London, while Westminster, outside of the boundaries of the City of London, was the seat of government. They are both today part of the urban core of Greater London.
- Kingdom of France: The traditional capital was Paris, though in the periods 1682–1789 and 1871–1879 the seat of government was at the Palace of Versailles, located southwest of Paris.

== See also ==
- Institutional seats of the European Union
  - Seat of the European Parliament in Strasbourg
  - Seat of the European Central Bank
- Regional seat of government
- Lists of capitals
