= Temporary capital =

Municipality serving as a temporary seat of government

A temporary capital or a provisional capital is a city or town chosen by a government as an interim base of operations due to some difficulty in retaining or establishing control of a different metropolitan area. The most common circumstances leading to this are either a civil war, where control of the capital is contested, or during an invasion, where the designated capital is taken or threatened.

By definition, a temporary capital is located somewhere on the country's territory, as opposed to a capital-in-exile located on the territory of a different country. However, a country's capital may move in and out of exile over the course of a conflict.

The following list is sorted by the most recent date the temporary capital's status existed.

== Current ==
=== National capitals ===
- Due to the ongoing Yemeni civil war, Yemen has declared Aden as its provisional capital while its de jure capital Sanaa is controlled by the rebel Houthis. The declaration was made by then-President Abd Rabbuh Mansur Hadi in the wake of the 2014–15 Yemeni coup d'état.
- Palestine has its provisional capital as the city of Ramallah due to the current Israeli occupation of East Jerusalem. Although officially supposed to be a provisional setup, the role of Ramallah as administrative capital of Palestine has not changed since the year 1993 when the Palestinian Authority was created.
- Due to the Western Sahara conflict, the Sahrawi Arab Democratic Republic has a declared temporary capital in Tifariti (previously Bir Lehlou), in contrast to its de jure capital of Laâyoune, which is controlled by Morocco. However, its de facto headquarters are in exile in Rabouni, Tindouf Province, Algeria.

=== Provincial capitals ===
- Due to the Russo-Ukrainian War, the capital of Donetsk Oblast was de facto moved from Donetsk to Mariupol in June 2014, then to Kramatorsk in October 2014, where it currently is.
- Due to the capture of Goma in January 2025 by the March 23 Movement, Beni became temporary provincial capital of North Kivu in the Democratic Republic of the Congo.
- Due to the capture of Bukavu in February 2025 by the March 23 Movement, Uvira became temporary provincial capital of South Kivu in the Democratic Republic of the Congo.

=== For reasons other than war ===
- Brades acts as the de facto temporary capital of Montserrat since 1998, after the de jure capital of Montserrat at Plymouth in the south of the island was abandoned in 1997 after it was buried by the eruptions of the Soufriere Hills volcano in 1995. Interim government buildings have since been built at Brades, becoming the new temporary capital in 1998. The move is intended to be temporary, but it has remained the island's de facto capital ever since. A new official capital is being constructed in the Little Bay area, but has been plagued by multiple delays.

== 21st century ==
- Port Sudan served as the de facto seat of government of Sudan between April 2023 and March 2025 as a result of the Battle of Khartoum (2023–2025).
- Lviv in western Ukraine was a de facto temporary capital of Ukraine during the Battle of Kyiv at the start of the Russian invasion of Ukraine in February 2022, with several other governments relocating their embassies. The embassies were moved back to Kyiv after the battle concluded in a Ukrainian victory.
  - Due to the Russo-Ukrainian War, the capital of Luhansk Oblast was de facto moved from Luhansk to Sievierodonetsk in 2014. As of the fall of Sievierodonetsk in June 2022, the government of Luhansk Oblast is operating remotely in Ukraine.
- The Turkish cabinet used İzmir as a temporary capital for a short while after the coup attempt on 15 July 2016.
- During the 2011 Libyan Civil War, the National Transitional Council (NTC) declared its base of operations in Benghazi to be the temporary capital of the Libyan Republic, as the NTC had previously declared its capital to be Tripoli, controlled by Muammar Gaddafi's Great Socialist People's Libyan Arab Jamahiriya.
- The Transitional Federal Government of Somalia met in various locations within its territory rather than Mogadishu while the latter was deemed too dangerous to meet in, such as Baidoa in 2007.
- Between 1996 and 2001, the Northern Alliance in Afghanistan relocated the capital from Kabul to Taloqan followed by Fayzabad.

== Cold War ==
- Germany after 1945 considered Berlin to remain the German capital. But due to the onset of the Cold War Berlin itself was divided and 161 kilometers (100 miles) beyond the Inner German Border within the Soviet-controlled zone that would soon become the German Democratic Republic. As a result, Bonn was established as a temporary capital for the Federal Republic of Germany until the two countries reunited in 1990. The Federal Republic of Germany's government and the bulk of its offices have since moved to Berlin, but a large portion of its offices remain in Bonn. (The German Basic Law has only mentioned the capital since 2008.)
- At the height of the Chinese Civil War in 1949, the Republic of China, whose capital was Nanjing, evacuated its central government, military, and many loyal citizens—totalling at around 1.2 to 2 million individuals—to the city of Taipei, located on the island of Taiwan.
  - The Constitution of the Republic of China does not mention a de jure capital, leaving the issue to other official texts, which were inconsistent initially. For example, an official text in 1967 declared Taipei to be the "wartime capital", one from 1969 and one from 1975 declared Taipei to be the "capital", and one from 1979 declared Nanjing to be the "national capital". From 1982 onward, official documents have consistently declared Taipei to be the capital. In 2004 the ROC bureau that maintains maps stopped censorship of privately published maps showing Taipei as the capital.
  - The provincial capital of Fujian, Republic of China was moved from Fuzhou to Jincheng, Kinmen Island after the evacuation. A year after the 1955 First Taiwan Strait Crisis, it was moved out of Fujian Province completely to Xindian, Taiwan Island and only military personnel were allowed onto Kinmen. After the end of the Cold War, it was moved back to Jincheng (before provinces were de facto abolished in 2018). A similar situation arose in Zhejiang Province before all of the province fell under the control of the PRC in 1955.
- During the Bangladesh Liberation War in 1971, the Provisional Government of Bangladesh declared Mujibnagar as the temporary capital, even though the seat of the government in exile remained in Calcutta for most of the war.
- During the First Indochina War (1946–1954) the government moved from Hanoi to Việt Bắc.
- During the Korean War, the South Korean government temporarily moved its capital to Pusan (Busan) before the Korean People's Army advance which conquered and occupied Seoul. South Korea reestablished Seoul as the permanent capital of South Korea after the Korean War Armistice.(see Provisional Capital Memorial Hall
  - During the UN offensive into North Korea, North Korea temporarily moved its capital from Pyongyang to Sinuiju, followed by Kanggye. Between 1948 and 1972, North Korea also claimed in its Constitution that Seoul was its de jure capital, and that Pyongyang was a temporary capital.

== World War II ==
- During the Second Sino-Japanese War, the capital of the Republic of China at Nanjing was captured by the Empire of Japan, forcing the Republic of China to relocate to Chongqing.
- Due to the Japanese occupation of the Philippines, the capital of the Philippine Commonwealth was de facto moved from Manila to Corregidor Island followed by various other yet-to-be-occupied islands, then Melbourne, then Washington, DC. After the Leyte Landing it was moved to Tacloban and finally back to Manila.
- Due to the Fall of France, the government of France/Free France moved from Paris to Tours on 10 June 1940, followed by Bordeaux on 14 June, followed by exile in London. As Free France regained territory, its de facto capital went from London to Brazzaville, followed by Algiers, and finally back to Paris. (In between D-Day and the Liberation of Paris, de Gaulle also gave a speech in Bayeux, Normandy proclaiming Bayeux the capital of Free France, and a regional government was set up there, but the legislature remained in Algiers.) The Pétain government was located in Vichy (1940–1944).
- By contrast, the Belgian government in exile continued to operate out of London while administering the Belgian Congo, and did not set up a temporary capital in the Belgian Congo.
- During World War II due to evacuation actions following Nazi Germany's invasion and the Battle of Moscow the Soviet Union had different de facto capitals:
  - Kuybyshev (now Samara) — planned temporary capital in case of occupation of Moscow and de facto temporary administrative and diplomatic capital
  - Sverdlovsk (now Yekaterinburg) — de facto temporary industrial capital
  - Kazan — de facto temporary scientific capital
  - Tyumen — de facto temporary spiritual capital due to the presence of the remains of Vladimir Lenin
- The Parliament of Finland moved from Helsinki to Kauhajoki during the Winter War.

== Interwar period ==
- During the Spanish Civil War, the Nationalists initially had a temporary capital at Burgos; once the Nationalists started to besiege Madrid, the Republicans maintained temporary capitals first at Valencia then at Barcelona. The capital returned to Valencia when Barcelona fell to the Catalonia Offensive.
- Lithuania in Kaunas rather than Vilnius during the interwar period when Poland controlled the latter city (see Temporary capital of Lithuania).
- The Pan-Russian "White" regime of Alexander Kolchak in Omsk during the Russian Civil War.
- Following the Armistice of 11 November 1918 that ended fighting in World War I, Berlin as the capital was considered too dangerous for the National Assembly to use as a meeting place, because of its street rioting after the German Revolution. Therefore, the calm and centrally located Weimar was chosen as the temporary capital (see Weimar Republic).

== World War I ==
- During the Finnish Civil War in 1918, Vaasa served as the temporary capital of White Finland when the Red Guards controlled the capital de jure, Helsinki. Vaasa continued to serve as the capital until the Battle of Helsinki.
- During the Serbian Campaign in World War I, the government of the Kingdom of Serbia temporarily moved its seat from Belgrade to Niš (1914–1915) and Corfu (1916–1918).
- During World War I, the government of Romania moved to Iaşi after the fall of Bucharest to the Central powers.

== 19th century ==
- The First Philippine Republic government under Emilio Aguinaldo had four different temporary capitals throughout the Philippine Revolution against Spanish colonization and subsequent American occupation: Malolos, Bacolor, Cabanatuan, and Palanan.
- During the Franco-Prussian War (1870–1871), France's Government of National Defence maintained two temporary capitals. President Louis-Jules Trochu led government ministries in besieged Paris, while Interior Minister Léon Gambetta evacuated other ministries to Bordeaux.
- During the lead-up to and the early weeks of the American Civil War, the provisional government of the Confederate States of America met in Montgomery, Alabama before relocating to Richmond, Virginia after Virginia joined the Confederacy. Likewise, after the fall of Richmond in 1865, the government evacuated to Danville, Virginia before Robert E. Lee's surrender at Appomattox Court House.
- During the Colombian Civil War (1860–1862), Pasto was declared temporary capital by the leaders of the Colombian Conservative Party.
- During the Hungarian War of Independence (1848–1849) the government moved from Pest-Buda to Debrecen.
- During the Napoleonic Wars, Lisbon was occupied and Portugal moved its capital to Rio de Janeiro, Portuguese Brazil.

== See also ==
- Summer capital
- Rival government
