= Capital of the Netherlands =

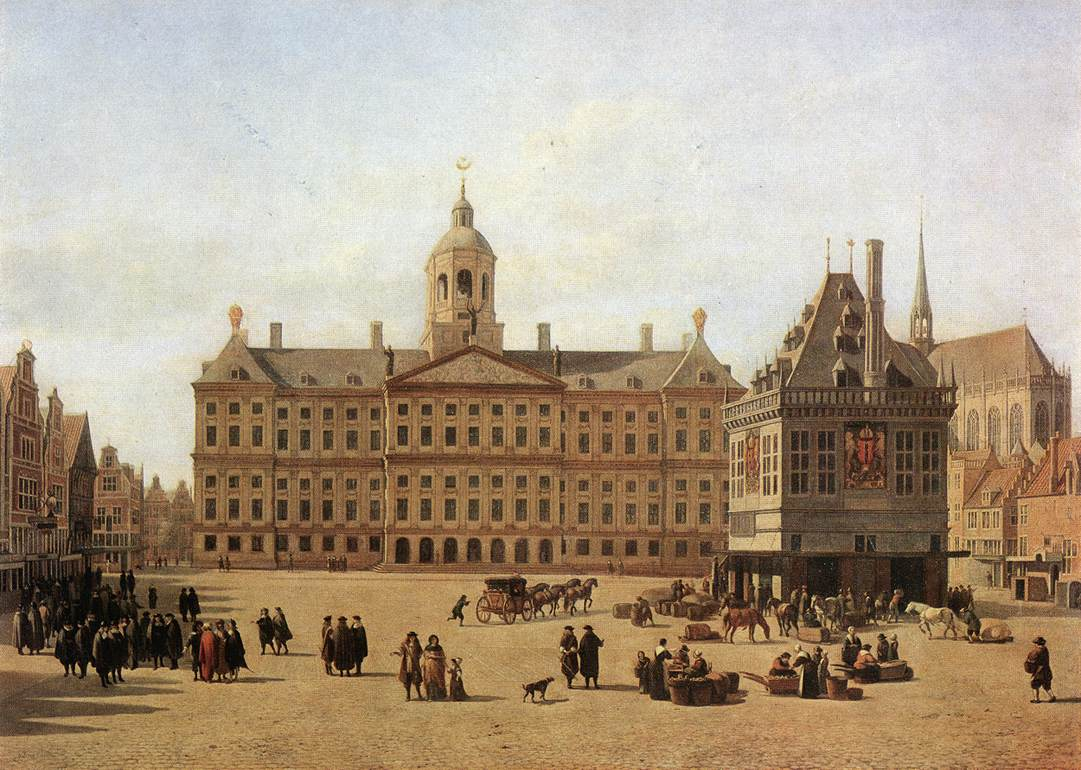
Dam Square with a view of the City Hall of Amsterdam in the late 17th century. Painting by Gerrit Adriaenszoon Berckheyde (Gemäldegalerie, Dresden).

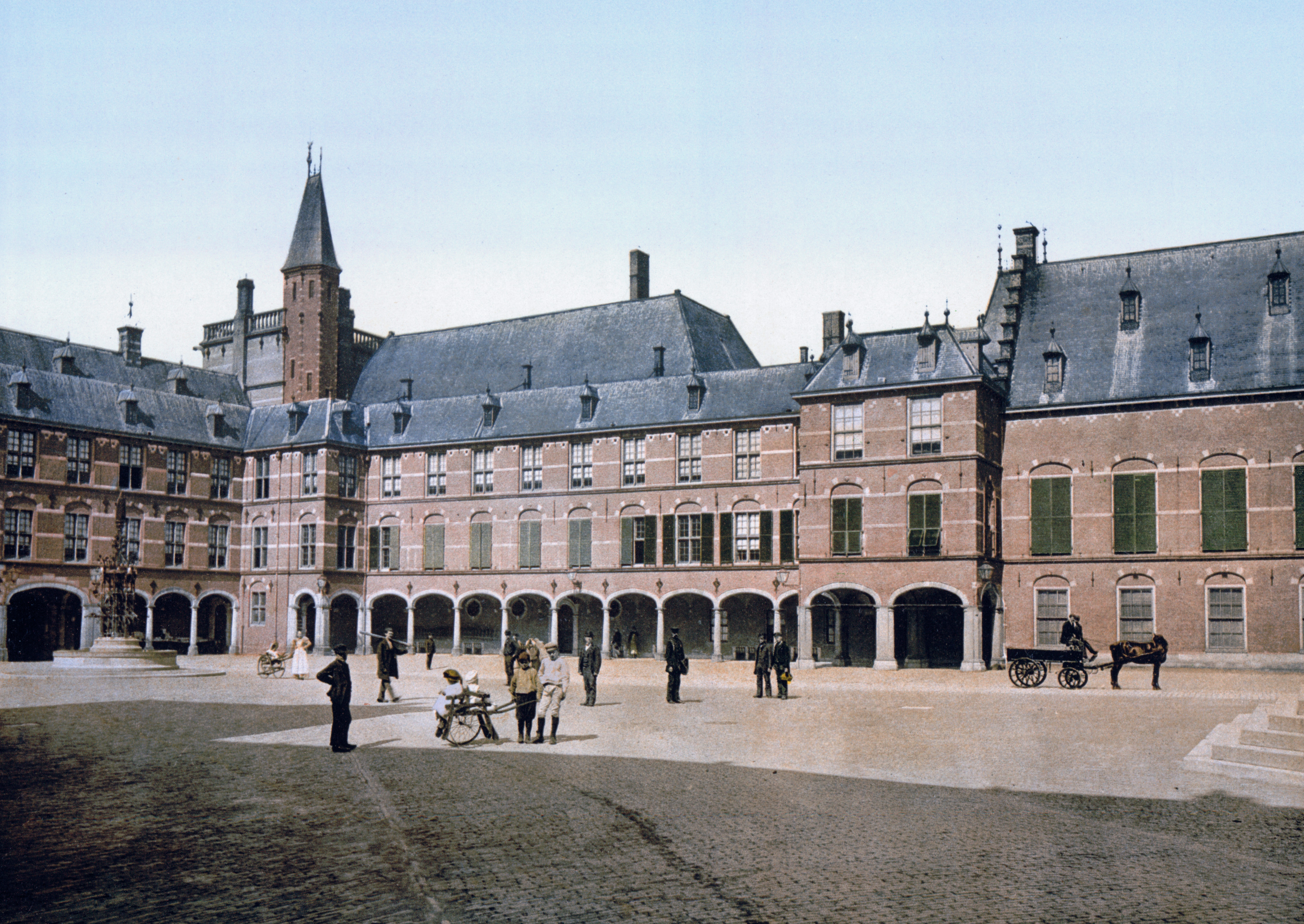
The Hague has been the seat of government of the Netherlands since 1588. The Binnenhof houses the States General of the Netherlands.

In the Netherlands, the Constitution refers to Amsterdam as the capital city. However, since 1588, the States General and the Executive Branch, along with the Supreme Court and the Council of State, have been situated in The Hague as the seat of government. Since the 1983 revision of the Constitution of the Netherlands, Article 32 mentions that "the King shall be sworn in and inaugurated as soon as possible in the capital city, Amsterdam". It is the only reference in the document stating that Amsterdam is the capital. In contrast, The Hague is customarily called the residentie ("residence").

Only once during its history was Amsterdam both "capital" and seat of government. Between 1808 and 1810, during the Kingdom of Holland, King Louis Napoleon resided in Amsterdam and declared the city capital of his kingdom and seat of government. To accommodate the king, the grand seventeenth-century Town Hall of Amsterdam, a prime example of the republican values that were prevalent for so long in the Netherlands, was converted into a Royal Palace.

In 1810, the Netherlands were annexed by the French Empire and King Louis Napoleon was replaced by a French governor, who took up residence in the Royal Palace in Amsterdam. From 1810 to 1813, Amsterdam kept its position of capital city somewhat, as Emperor Napoleon declared the city to be the third city of the Empire (after Paris and Rome) and an imperial residence. In December 1813, after the fall of Napoleon and the accession of Prince William VI of Orange as Sovereign Prince of the Netherlands, The Hague was restored as the seat of government.

== Historical background ==
Although the proper legal status of Amsterdam as capital of the Netherlands is of recent date, the city has been recognized as the capital since 1814. In that year Willem Frederik, Prince of Orange and Nassau, was proclaimed Sovereign Prince of the United Netherlands and invested as such on 30 March 1814 in the Nieuwe Kerk in Amsterdam. This is partly because it is a Royal City, used not only for the inauguration of kings, but also for royal weddings (note though that royal burials take place in Delft), and also because of its dominant position in Dutch history. From the end of the 16th century, the city grew rapidly to become the largest and most powerful city in the Netherlands and the main centre of trade, commerce, finance and culture.

The origins of the split between Amsterdam as capital city and The Hague as seat of government lay in the peculiar Dutch constitutional history. From the middle-ages to the sixteenth century, The Hague had been the seat of government of the County of Holland and residence of the Counts of Holland. Amsterdam in the meantime was growing to be a more important city. After the establishment of the Republic of the United Netherlands in 1572/1581, Dordrecht briefly became the seat of government of the United Provinces, residence of the States General, the Council of State and the Prince of Orange as Prince Stadtholder. In 1588, these central governmental institutions were moved to The Hague, which, from that point onwards, kept the position of seat of government for the whole republic. Amsterdam remained loyal to the Spanish/Burgundian empire until relatively late in the Eighty Years War, which allowed the city a lot of trade opportunities, but made it unsuitable for the seat of government of the emerging 'rebel' state.

Before the institution of the Batavian Republic of 1795, the Netherlands was not a unitary state, but more of a confederation in which the independent provinces and the larger cities and towns were very much politically autonomous. During the seventeenth century, the Prince Stadtholder as official of the States of Holland clashed several times with the city government of Amsterdam about policy, up to the point that the city was beleaguered by the army. Up to 1795 there remained a strong animosity between the Orange faction and the republican faction in Dutch politics. The former supported the idea of hereditary political leadership vested in the princes of Orange as Stadtholders, and had its powerbase in The Hague and the rural areas. The latter supported civic independence and found its support mainly in the cities and towns of Holland, with Amsterdam as its progenitor and most outspoken representative.

When in 1814 the new kingdom was formed, the appointment of Amsterdam, still the most prominent city in the kingdom, as capital city was also very much a conciliatory gesture of the Orange faction towards the town, and a recognition of the strong civic and republican basis of the new kingdom.

== Brussels ==
Brussels was briefly the capital of the Netherlands and the Low Countries in the 16th and 19th centuries. Brussels was the capital of the Seventeen Provinces (1549–1581). During the United Kingdom of the Netherlands (1815–1839), there were two government centres: The Hague and Brussels. The government sat in one of these cities every other year. As a result, ministers and officials had to own or rent homes in both cities.

Brussels was successively the capital of the Duchy of Brabant, the Seventeen Provinces, the Southern Netherlands, and the United Kingdom of the Netherlands. It is currently the capital of Belgium, the Flemish and French Communities, as well as the de facto capital of the European Union.

== See also ==
- List of countries with multiple capitals
