= Holland Township =

Holland Township may refer to:

- Holland Township, Saline County, Arkansas, in Saline County, Arkansas
- Holland Township, Illinois
- Holland Township, Iowa
- Holland Township, Kansas
- Holland Township, Missaukee County, Michigan
- Holland Charter Township, Michigan in Ottawa County
- Holland Township, Minnesota
- Holland Township, Missouri
- Holland Township, New Jersey
- Holland Township, Douglas County, South Dakota, in Douglas County, South Dakota

== See also ==
- Howland Township, Ohio
