= Hollond =

Hollond is a surname. Notable people with the surname include:

- Henry Arthur Hollond (1884–1974), professor and army officer
- John Robert Hollond (1843–1912), politician
- Robert Hollond (1808–1877), English balloonist and politician
- Spencer Edmund Hollond (1874–1950), British Army officer

== See also ==
- Holland (disambiguation)
