= Provisional Capital Memorial Hall =

Museum in Busan, South Korea

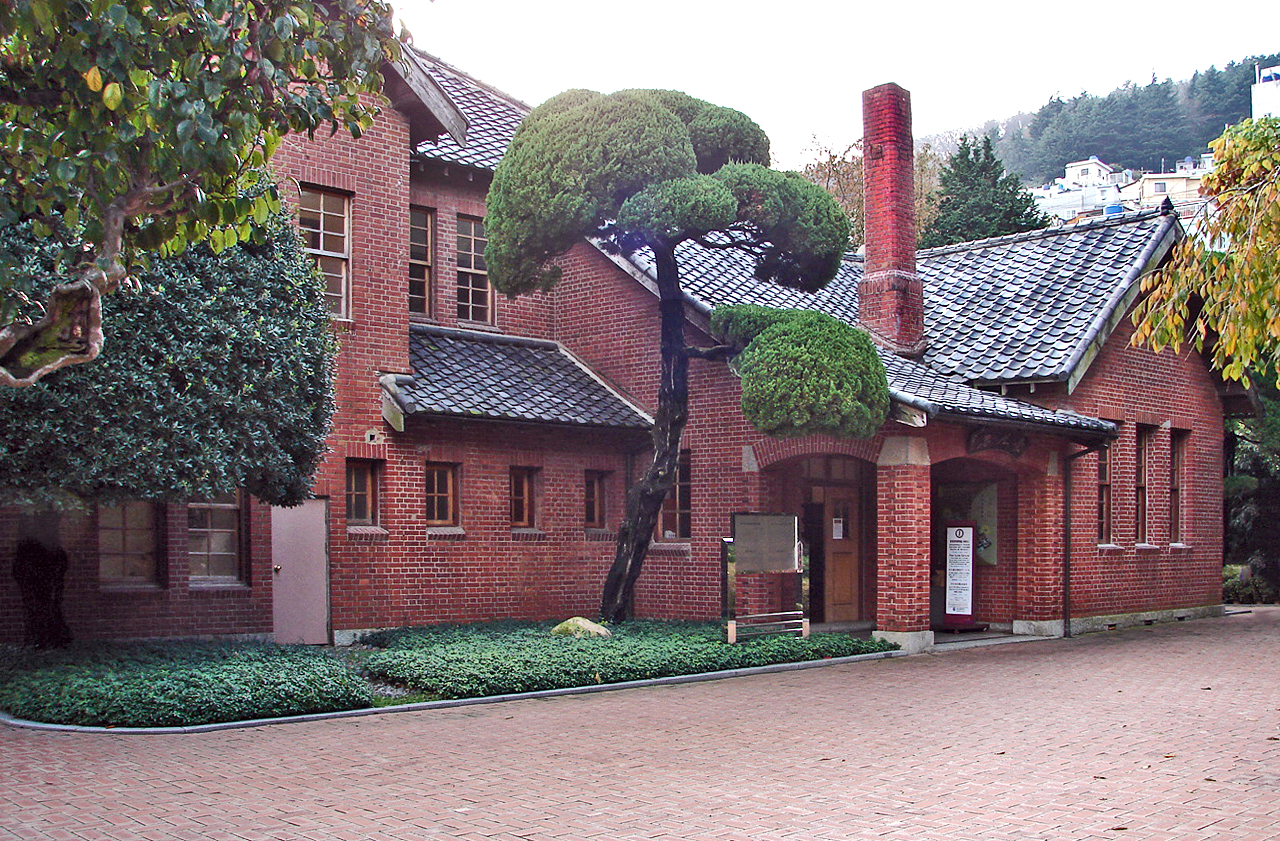
- The building (2011)
- Interactive map of the Provisional Capital Memorial Hall area

General information
- Location: 45 Imsisudoginyeom-ro, Seo District, Busan, South Korea
- Coordinates: 35.103345°N 129.017306°E
- Completed: August 10, 1926

Technical details
- Floor count: 2
- Floor area: 452 m^{2} (4,870 ft^{2})

Website
- museum.busan.go.kr/eng/pcmhmintro01 (in English)

The Provisional Capital Memorial Hall (Korean: 임시수도기념관; Hanja: 臨時首都記念館) is a museum in Bumin-dong, Seo District, Busan, South Korea. The building was used by the President of South Korea, Syngman Rhee, when Busan was the provisional capital of South Korea during the Korean War.

== History ==
The building was first completed on August 10, 1926, during the 1910–1945 Japanese colonial period. It used as the residence of the governor of South Gyeongsang Province, when the capital was moved from Jinju to Busan. It would continue to be used as such until 1983. An exception to this was the period from 1950–1952, when it served as the residence of the President of South Korea during the Korean War.

On July 1, 1983, the capital of South Gyeongsang Province was moved to Changwon, and this hall was renovated and turned into a museum. It opened on June 25, 1984 (the anniversary of the Korean War). Renovation work was conducted and more exhibitions were added between 1997 and 2000.

== Description ==
It is a two-story building with an internal area of 452 m^{2} (4,870 ft^{2}). The property it is on has an area of 2,621 m^{2} (28,210 ft^{2}). Both floors have history exhibits. The second floor has the desk, bed, and chair that Rhee used. There is a byeongpung (Korean folding screen) with a poem by Rhee.

This building was renovated from April 2000 to November 2001 to its current state. During the renovation, the Photographic Gallery section was added. The gallery houses a collection of photographs from the Korean War.

The Provisional Capital Memorial Hall is Designated Artifact #53 of Busan Metropolitan City.

== Gallery ==
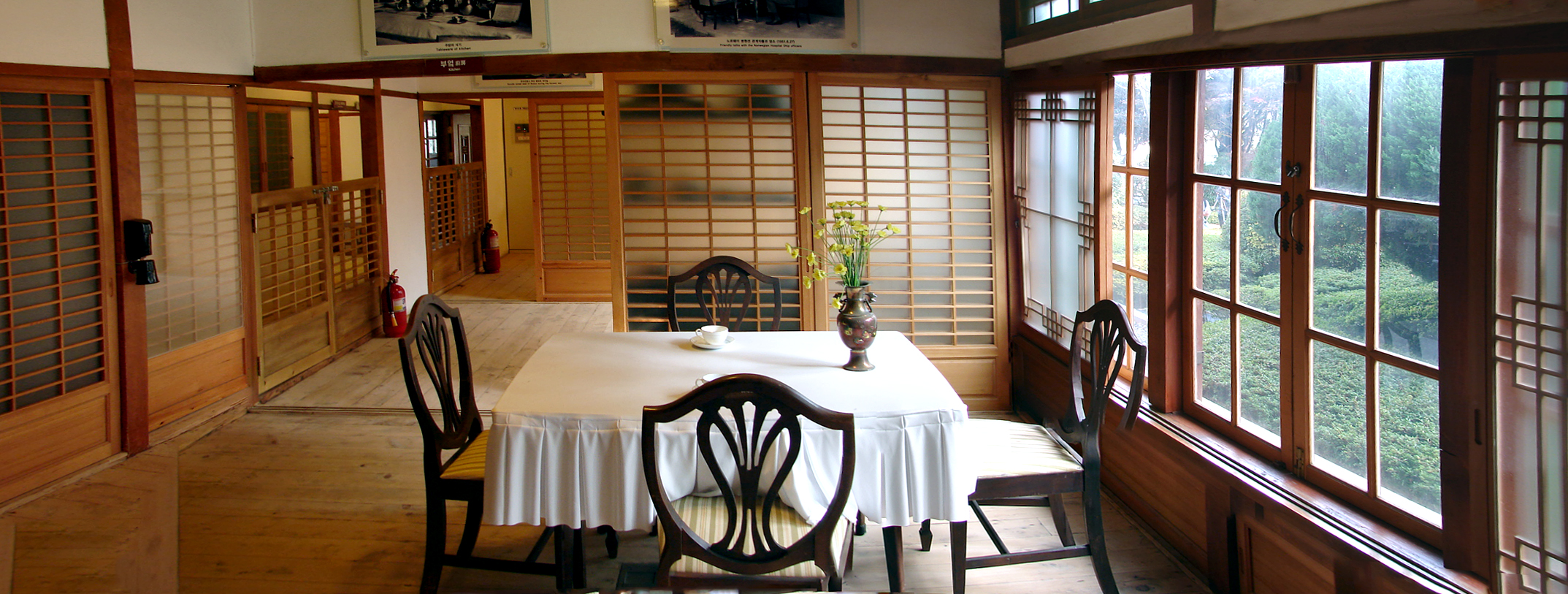
Dining room (2011)

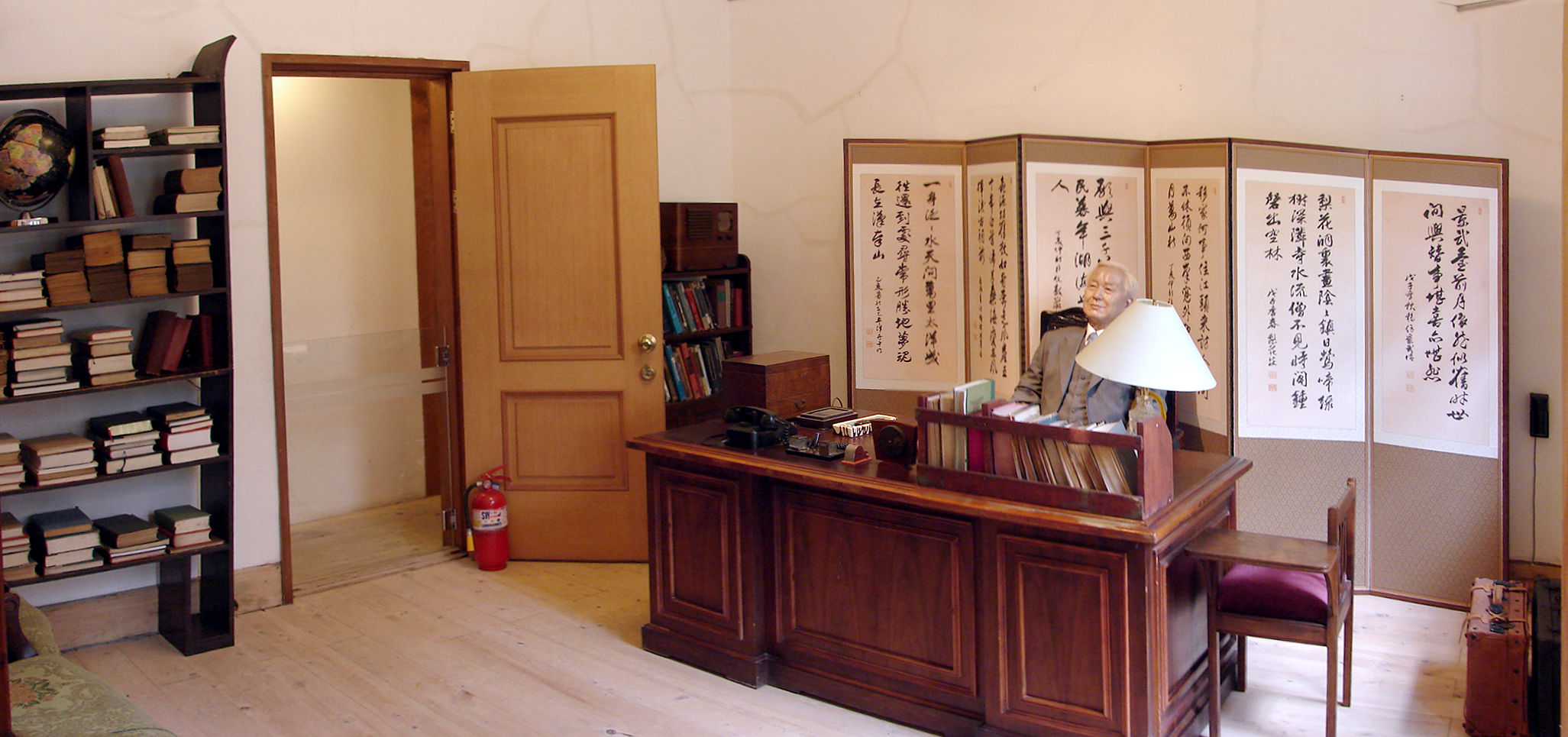
Rhee's study (2011)

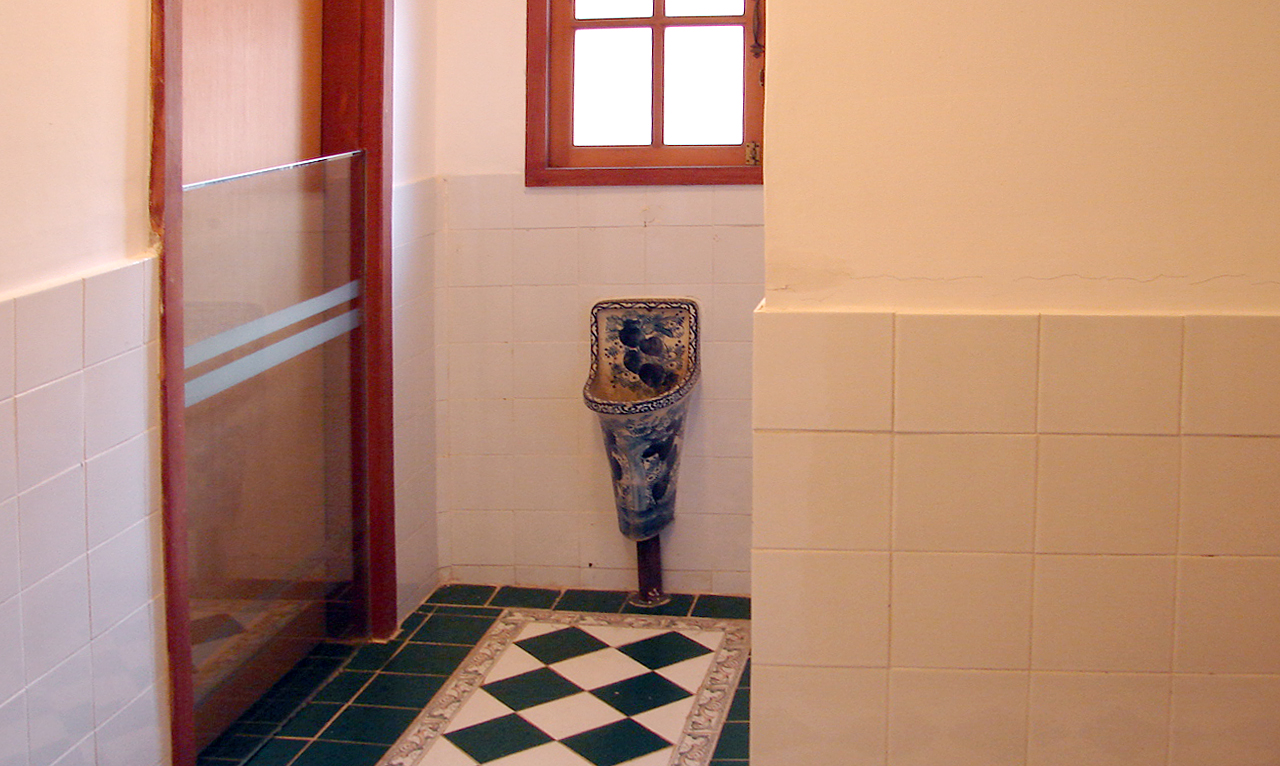
Bathroom (2011)

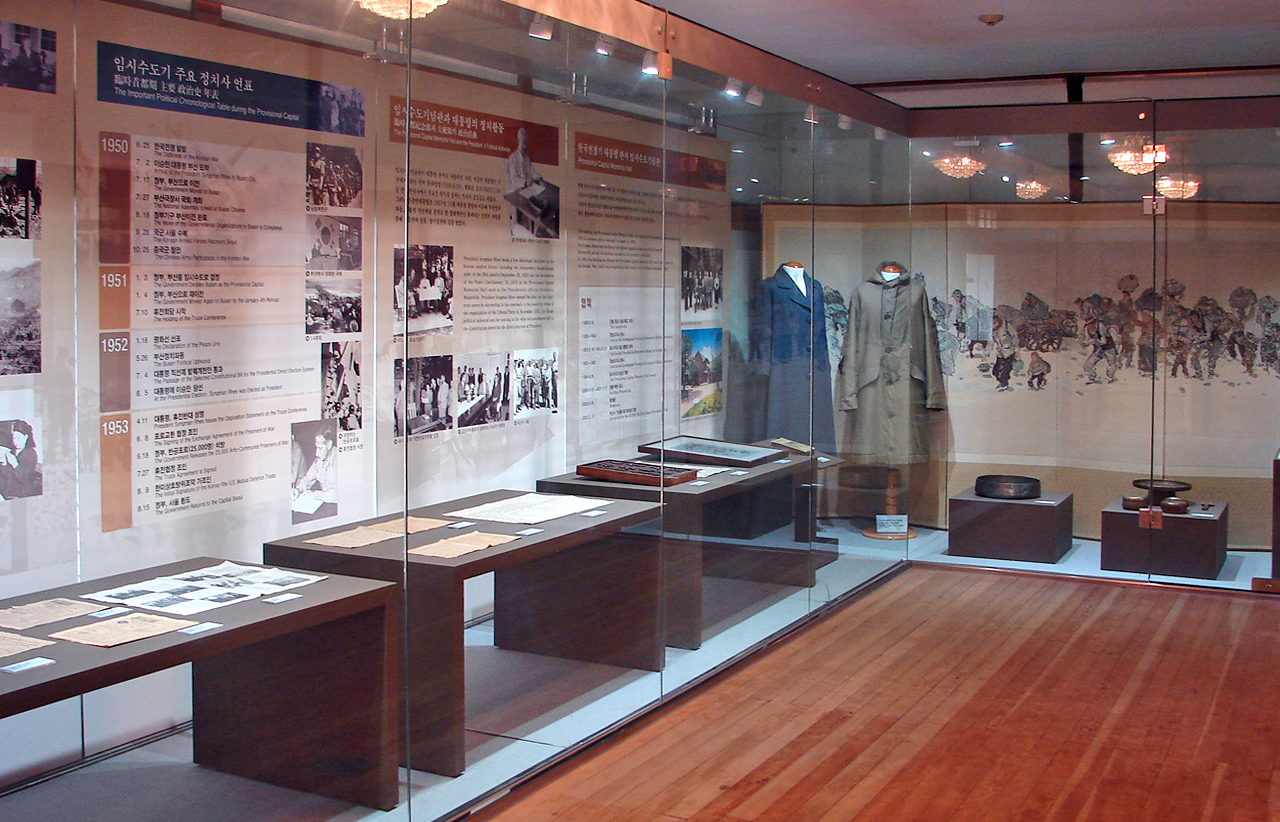
Upstairs display (2011)
