= Hollands =

Hollands may refer to:

People with the surname Hollands:

- Fred Hollands (1870–1948), English footballer
- Danny Hollands (born 1985), English footballer
- Lotte Hollands, Dutch mathematical physicist
- Mario Hollands (born 1988), American baseball player
- Mike Hollands (born 1946), Australian animator and film director
- Terry Hollands (born 1979), English Strongman

== Other uses ==
- Holland gin or Jenever, a juniper-flavored liquor
- Holland's Pies, A manufacturer of pies and puddings based in Baxenden, near Accrington in Lancashire, England
- Holland's Magazine, a magazine published from 1876 to 1953
