= New Holland =

New Holland may refer to:

== Places and jurisdictions ==
Dutch colonial claims

- New Holland (Acadia), 1670s claim in northeastern North America
- New Holland (Australia), 17th- to 19th-century name for the continent of Australia
  - Apostolic Prefecture of New Holland, 1816–1819 Roman Catholic missionary jurisdiction
  - Apostolic Vicariate of New Holland and Van Diemen's Land, 1834–1842 Roman Catholic missionary jurisdiction
- New Holland (Brazil), 17th-century Dutch West India Company territories on the northeast coast of Brazil

Places in the United States

- New Holland, Georgia
- New Holland, Illinois
- New Holland, Ohio
- New Holland, North Carolina
- New Holland, Pennsylvania
- New Holland, South Dakota

Places elsewhere

- New Holland, Saint Elizabeth, Jamaica
- New Holland Island, Saint Petersburg, Russia
- New Holland, Lincolnshire, United Kingdom

== Companies ==
- New Holland Agriculture, brand of agricultural machinery of CNH, part of the Italian Fiat group
- New Holland Construction, brand of construction equipment of CNH, part of the Italian Fiat group
- New Holland Machine Company, a predecessor of New Holland Agriculture and New Holland Construction
- New Holland Brewing Company of Holland, Michigan, United States
- New Holland Publishers, an International book and map publisher with a head office in South Africa and offices in the United Kingdom, Australia and New Zealand

== Railways ==
- New Holland Pier railway station, now defunct, serving New Holland Pier, Lincolnshire, United Kingdom
- New Holland railway station, serving New Holland, Lincolnshire, United Kingdom

== Other ==
- New Holland (band), a band from South Africa
- The Flag of New Holland
- New Holland honeyeater (Phylidonyris novaehollandiae), a bird of southern Australia
- New Holland mouse (Pseudomys novaehollandiae), found in southeastern Australia
- New Holland seahorse (Hippocampus whitei), found in the southwest Pacific ocean
- New Holland frog (Cyclorana novaehollandiae), found in east Queensland

== See also ==
- Dutch Brazil
- Holland (disambiguation)
- New Netherland
