= Holland Thompson (politician) =

American politician

Holland Thompson was a teacher, state legislator, religious leader, and civil rights advocate in Alabama. He represented Montgomery County, Alabama in the Alabama House of Representatives during the Reconstruction era.

A former slave, he served as a city councilor (alderman?) after the American Civil War. He helped form the Alabama Baptist Missionary Convention and the Dexter Avenue Baptist Church. He advocated for schools, police, and cemeteries for African Americans.

== See also ==
- African American officeholders from the end of the Civil War until before 1900
