= Hollander (disambiguation) =

Hollander is a surname.

Hollander may also refer to:

- Hollander beater, a paper pulp machine
- Dutch rabbit, a breed of domestic rabbit historically known as Hollander
