= USS Holland =

Several ships of the United States Navy have been named USS Holland:

- USS Holland (SS-1), launched 1897 as the prototype Holland VI, then commissioned as USS Holland in 1900, was one of the US Navy's first submarines.
- USS Holland (AS-3), launched 1926, was a submarine tender that served in World War II and was scrapped in 1953.
- USS Holland (AS-32), launched 1963, was a submarine tender decommissioned in 1996.
