= Holland Coffee =

American trader

Holland Coffee (August 15, 1807 – October 1, 1846) was an American trader, guide, interpreter, and representative of Fannin County. He was involved with the settlement of the present-day Lake Texoma area and acted as a liaison between the Native Americans and Euro-American settlers in the area. Coffee was known chiefly for his trading and relations with Native American tribes such as the Comanches, Kiowa, Caddo, Wichita, and Delaware, and his many trading posts established in places such as Tillman, Love, and Cotton Counties. While Coffee was known for his prosperity, his land expansions brought along debt as well.

== Biography ==
=== Early life ===
Coffee was born in Warren County, Tennessee, to Mildred (Moore) and Ambrose Coffee. Coffee became an orphan at the age of 11 and was sent to live with his uncle Jesse Coffee in McMinnville, Tennessee.

=== Coffee, Colville, and Company days ===
In 1829, Holland Coffee and Silas Colville arrived in Fort Smith, Arkansas, where they established Coffee, Colville, and Company. Later in the 1830s, Coffee and Colville established a trading post on the Red River where they traded horses with Native American tribes such as the Comanches. Mexican officials blamed this horse trading for raids on Mexican ranches, even going so far as to say that Coffee encouraged them Many at the time came to dislike Coffee enough to want government intervention on his trading posts, which led to a failed assassination attempt. During that time, the Texas Congress twice reimbursed Coffee for negotiating ransoms with Native Americans to free Caucasian settlers. In 1835, Coffee was noted as a significant contributor to the Camp Holmes Treaty. In 1838, Coffee married Sophia Suttenfield Aughinbaugh four days after her divorce from her marriage with Jesse Aughinbaugh.

Fannin County, Texas

=== Representative days ===
Coffee was elected as the first Representative of the newly-established Fannin County in the 1838-1839 Texas House of Representatives session. He was selected to help enact a treaty between Texas and Native Americans at Shawnee Village. He was known for his positive relations with many Native Americans and could speak seven different native dialects. Coffee's prosperity was attributed to the trading he conducted with the Natives; he traded weapons and alcohol in exchange for cattle that was claimed to be stolen by the Native Americans. Coffee profited from negotiations and diplomatic relations with a relatively untapped Indian market. While these deals could be very dangerous, Coffee and his land were never seriously harmed by the Natives.

=== Glen Eden days ===
In 1840, Coffee and Colville decided to conclude their partnership and divided their joint land equally. While it is unknown why the partnership ended, some scholars believe the split resulted from Coffee's marriage to Sophie Suttenfield Aughinbaugh the year before. After the Arkansas government opposed a proposed alcohol trading policy, Coffee left Fort Smith and built a trading post on the Red River. A few years later, Coffee moved his trading post farther downstream. At the time, Coffee handled many military supply needs paid for in land. Coffee moved away from general trading and began farming shortly after this point. In 1843, he built a home he named Glen Eden, where he lived for about three years.

In 1845, Coffee's Bend, thanks to close access to the military road established by William G. Cooke from 1840 to 1841, became the most populous section of Preston County (present-day Grayson County).. At this trading post Coffee supplied the Native Americans in accordance with treaties in effect at the time. Coffee also supplied, and many times acted as a guide, for various groups, notably Jacob M. Snavely's Expedition against a Mexican trade caravan.

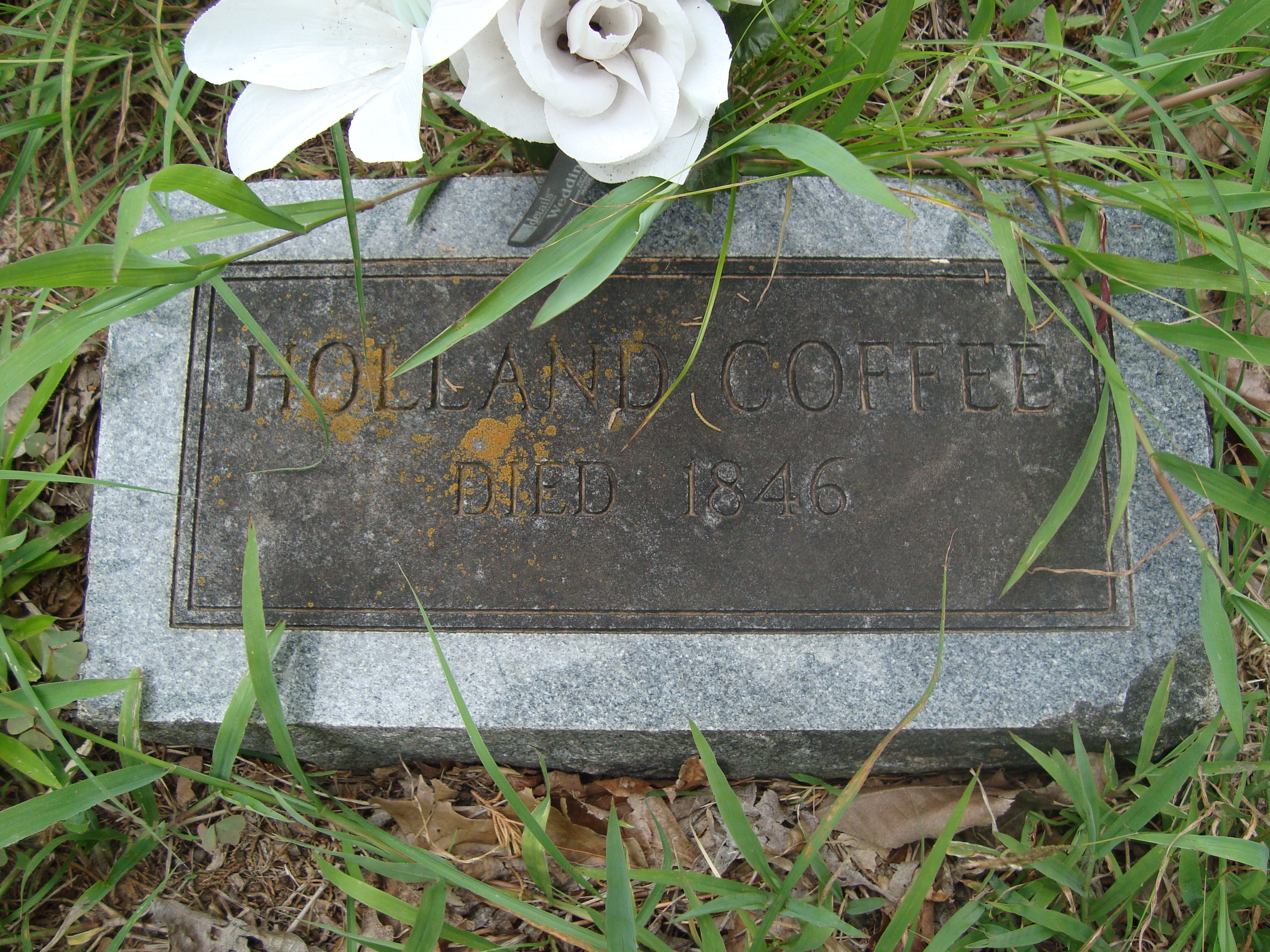
Holland Coffee's Grave

=== Death ===
Coffee died on October 1, 1846, from being stabbed in a fight with Chas A. Galloway. The cause of the fight is unknown. Some scholars conjecture that the conflict began when Coffee responded to an offensive comment about his wife. Coffee was buried behind his home, Glen Eden; his remains later were relocated to Preston Bend Cemetery.
