= HNLMS Holland =

HNLMS Holland (Dutch: Hr.Ms. or Zr.Ms. Holland) may refer to following ships of the Royal Netherlands Navy:

- HNLMS Holland (1896), a Holland class protected cruiser
- HNLMS Holland (D808), a Holland-class destroyer
- HNLMS Holland (P840), a Holland-class offshore patrol vessels
