= Holland (singer) =

South Korean singer (born 1996)

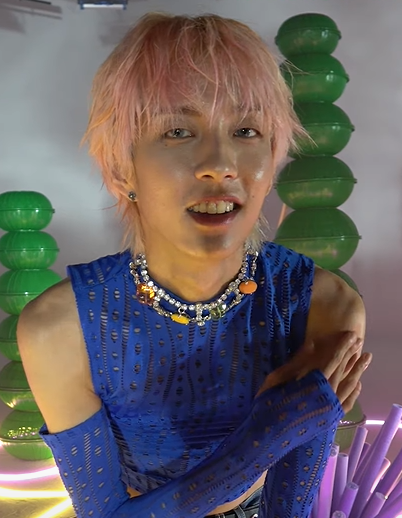
- Holland in July 2023

Background information
- Born: Go Tae-seob; March 4, 1996 (age 30); Seoul, South Korea
- Genre: K-pop
- Occupation: Singer
- Years active: 2018–present
- Label: Holland Entertainment

Korean name
- Hangul: 고태섭
- RR: Go Taeseop
- MR: Ko T'aesŏp

Go Tae-seob (Korean: 고태섭; born March 4, 1996), professionally known as Holland (Korean: 홀랜드), is a South Korean singer. He made his debut in January 2018, with the release of the single "Neverland".

== Name ==
Go chose Holland for his stage name as a tribute to the first country to legalize same-sex marriage.

== Career ==
When Holland first decided to pursue music, he attempted to audition to join an entertainment company. However, no entertainment company was willing to work with an openly gay artist, so he worked two part-time jobs in order to fund his own debut single. Holland released his debut single, "Neverland", on January 21, 2018. Its music video accumulated over 1 million views in 20 hours. The music video shows Holland and his male counterpart kissing, and received a 19+ rating in South Korea.

He returned on June 6 with his next single, "I'm Not Afraid". The music video also received a 19+ rating, but it was soon after removed. His third single, "I'm So Afraid", was released on July 17. On September 6, Holland launched a crowdfunding campaign to help fund his first mini-album. He raised US$40,000 in the first 24 hours.

On March 19, 2019, Holland announced his self-titled mini album, Holland, and the tracks "Nar_C" and "Up" on his social media accounts. The album was released on March 31.

On July 8, 2019, Holland announced plans for his first tour via social media. Later on November 1, Holland announced his first tour, "Holland: Invitation from Neverland". The tour was a collaboration with MyMusicTaste where fans voted on concert tour locations. He traveled to five cities in Europe. Months after releasing his debut mini album, Holland started teasing his next single "Loved You Better" on his social media platforms starting December 2, 2019. The song and music video were released on December 11.

On April 24, 2022, Holland released "Ocean Like Me", his first song in 2 years, for the web drama "Ocean Likes Me" (2022), where he plays the role for Tommy, one of the protagonists. Its full soundtrack was released on July 9, 2022. On December 22 of the same year, he released DAY BY DAY for the soundtrack of "Oh! My Assistant" (2022).

On March 30, 2023, Holland made a comeback with the synth-pop single "NUMBER BOY". It was released together with its music video. In an interview for the Brazilian magazine Quem, he said: "To be honest, I was fed up with being discriminated against and living underground because I was gay. Along with wanting to live a more honest life, I wanted to be a person who could help my LGBTQIA+ friends and I wanted to prove that to those who bullied me at school. I wanted to show that I was loved as a gay man and that I was successful. It was my own method of revenge!"

== Personal life ==
Holland is known as "the first openly gay K-pop idol". He is an only child. His parents found out about his sexuality after he discussed it in an interview. Holland, who was not home at the time, wrote a letter to his family after they found out and explained everything to them. His family tearfully accepted him, unaware of the hardships he had gone through because of his sexuality. He was a photography major at Seoul Institute of Arts, but dropped out after his debut in 2018.

Go decided to make his debut as a singer to speak out based on his experiences with violence inflicted on sexual minorities. While preparing the album, he tried to sign with several agencies, but all declined to sign him due to his desire to write music dealing with discrimination against LGBTQ people. In the end, he produced his first single with money he saved from his part-time job over the course of two years, without an agency backing him.

== Discography ==
=== Extended Plays ===
- Holland (2019)

=== Singles ===
Title	Year	Peak chart positions	Album
Title	Year	KOR	Album
"Neverland"	2018	—	Holland
"I'm Not Afraid"	2018	—	Holland
"I'm So Afraid"	2018	—	Holland
"Nar_C"	2019	—	Holland
"Loved You Better"	2019	—	Non-album single
"Number Boy"	2023	—	Non-album single
"걔가 그러는데 (bitch he's mine)"	2024	—	Non-album single

=== Music videos ===
Title	Year	Director
"Neverland"	2018	Seonjin Lee
"I'm Not Afraid"	2018	Downy Jung
"I'm So Afraid"	2018	Downy Jung
"Nar_C"	2019	Lee Sangdeok
"Loved You Better"	2019	Lee Sangdeok
"Number Boy"	2023	Shin Hee Won
"걔가 그러는데 (bitch he's mine)"	2024	Mirai Mono

== Filmography ==
=== Web series ===
Year	Title	Role	Ref.
2022	Ocean Like Me	Tommy	
2022	Roommates of Poongduck 304	Ho Cheol	

== Listicles ==
Name of publisher, year listed, name of listicle and placement
Publisher	Year	Listicle	Placement	Ref.
Dazed	2018	Dazed 100	1st	
