= Hollandia (moth) =

Scientific classification
- Domain: Eukaryota
- Kingdom: Animalia
- Phylum: Arthropoda
- Class: Insecta
- Order: Lepidoptera
- Superfamily: Noctuoidea
- Family: Erebidae
- Subfamily: Calpinae
- Genus: Hollandia; Butler, 1892

Genus of moths

Hollandia is a genus of moths of the family Erebidae. The genus was erected by Arthur Gardiner Butler in 1892.

== Species ==
- Hollandia sigillata Butler, 1892 Gabon, Central African Republic
- Hollandia spurrelli Hampson, 1926 Ghana, Nigeria
