= Holland Township, Missouri =

Township in Pemiscot County, Missouri, U.S.

Coordinates: 36.033451°N 89.900431°W

Holland Township is an inactive township in Pemiscot County, in the U.S. state of Missouri.

Holland Township takes its name from the community of Holland, Missouri.
