= Holland, Wisconsin =

Holland, Wisconsin is the name of some places in the U.S. state of Wisconsin:

- Holland, Brown County, Wisconsin, a town in Brown County
- Holland, La Crosse County, Wisconsin, a town in La Crosse County
- Holland, Sheboygan County, Wisconsin, a town in Sheboygan County
- Hollandtown, Wisconsin, an unincorporated community in Brown County, some maps call it Holland
