= Holandia, Pomeranian Voivodeship =

Holandia
- Settlement
- Location within Poland
- Coordinates: 54°2′42″N 17°24′32″E
- Country: Poland
- Voivodeship: Pomeranian
- County: Bytów
- Gmina: Lipnica
- Population: 6

Holandia [xɔˈlandja] is a settlement in the administrative district of Gmina Lipnica, within Bytów County, Pomeranian Voivodeship, in northern Poland.

For details of the history of the region, see History of Pomerania.
