= Rabouni refugee camp =

Rabouni refugee camp مخيم الرابوني
- Administrative centre of the Sahrawi refugee camps
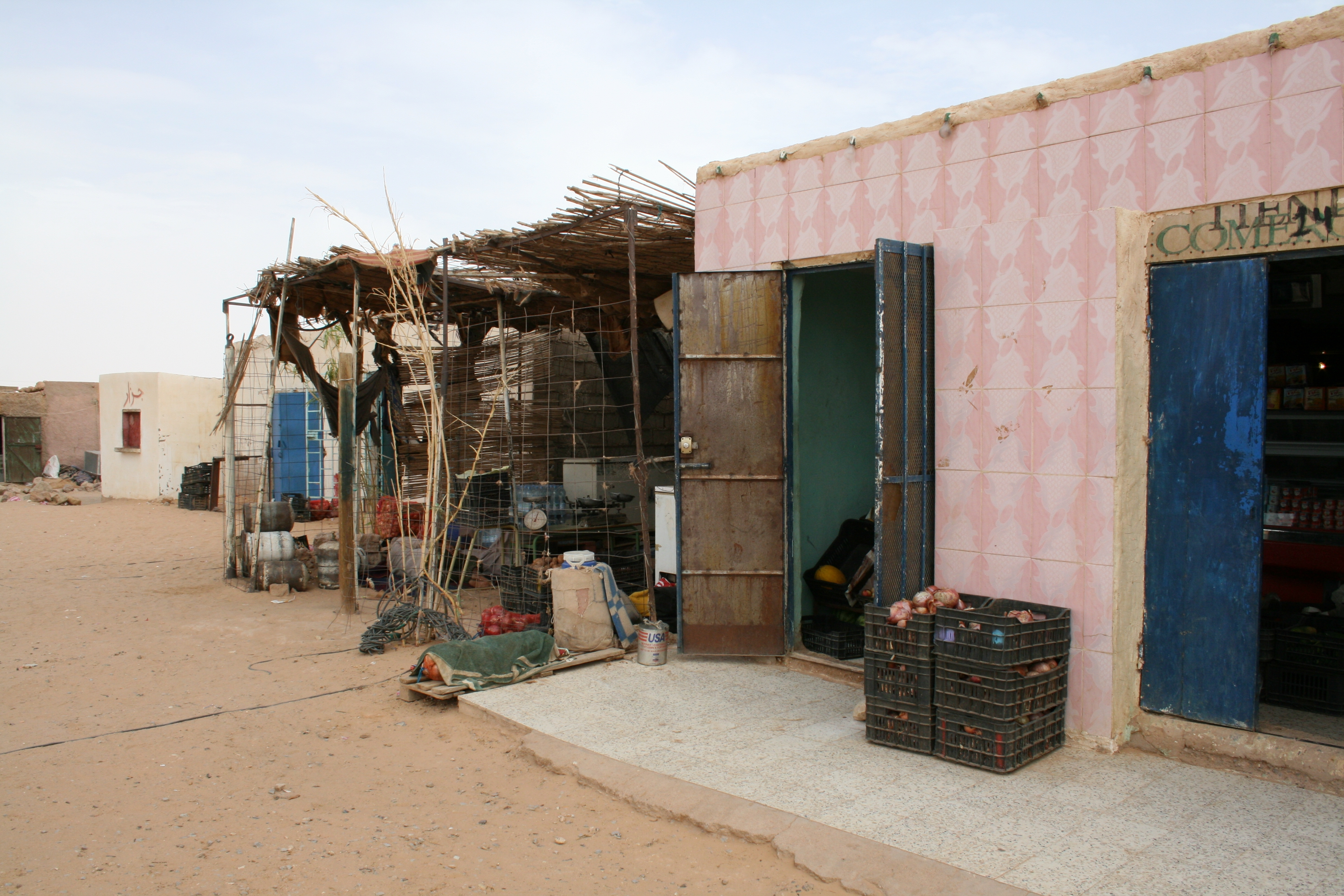

- Location within Algeria
- Coordinates: 27°28′32″N 8°5′16″W
- Country: Algeria
- Province: Tindouf

Rabouni refugee camp (Arabic: مخيم الرابوني) is a Sahrawi refugee camp located in Tindouf province in southwestern Algeria. On 23 October 2011, the Al-Qaeda-tied Movement for Oneness and Jihad in West Africa kidnapped three foreign aid workers from Rabouni and released them about a year later in exchange for $18 million and the release of three Islamists.

== Background ==
It is the administrative centre of the Sahrawi refugee camps. It is the site of the Sahrawi Arab Democratic Republic (SADR) state ministries, the main hospital and the principal field offices of international non-governmental organizations and United Nations agencies that regularly operate in the refugee camps. The camp is the settlement most easily accessible by paved road from Tindouf.

On 23 October 2011, the Al-Qaeda-tied Movement for Oneness and Jihad in West Africa kidnapped three foreign aid workers from Rabouni and took them to northern Mali. It was not until July 2012 that the Islamist militants released them in exchange for $18 million and the release of three Islamists. Consequently, SADR authorities constructed one meter high earth berms around Rabouni and other individual camps.
