= Summer capital =

Location used as administrative capital during the hot summer

A summer capital is a city used as an administrative capital during extended periods of particularly hot summer weather. The term is mostly of relevance in historical contexts of political systems with ruling classes that would migrate to a summer capital, making it less prevalent in modern times. The ubiquity of air conditioning systems also reduces the imperative to periodically relocate to summer capitals.

== Summer capitals around the world ==
=== China ===
Shangdu (Xanadu) was an "Upper Capital" during Kublai Khan's reign in the 13th century.

In the Qing dynasty, Chengde Mountain Resort in Chengde was often being used by emperor to perform their official function during the summer months.

In the era of the Republic of China, core members of the Nationalist Party of China often held meetings at Kuling, Jiujiang, in summer to make important internal decisions. Foreign businessmen and missionaries also spent their summertime in Kuling during Republic of China government rule.

In the era of the People's Republic of China, core members of the Chinese Communist Party often held meetings at Beidaihe District in the summer to make important internal decisions.

=== India ===
During the reign of Mughal emperor Babur, the city of Kabul in the north-west of the Mughal Empire was used as a summer capital owing to its lower temperatures compared with Agra and Delhi. This practice ended during the reign of Emperor Aurangzeb.

In India, the government of the British Raj was annually transferred to Shimla during the summer months.

Presently, India has summer and winter capitals in three states and one union territory.

State/UT	Summer capital	Winter capital
Himachal Pradesh	Shimla	Dharamshala
Jammu and Kashmir	Srinagar	Jammu
Maharashtra	Mumbai	Nagpur
Uttarakhand	Bhararisain	Dehradun

=== Philippines ===
The Baguio Summer Capital arch in 2024

The hill station of Baguio in the northern mountains of Luzon was selected as the summer capital of the Philippines during the American administration in the early 20th century. Its cool climate was a preferred alternative to the sweltering, humid climate of the de facto capital, Manila. While the present sovereign government has long stopped transferring there en masse, the city still hosts the official summer residence of the president of the Philippines, and the Supreme Court of the Philippines still maintains its "summer sessions" in the city. The city itself remains a popular holiday spot for tourists, especially around Christmas season and the hot dry season (colloquially known as "summer" in the country), when temperatures are considerably lower than in the rest of the archipelago.

=== Russia ===
Following Russia's loss of the traditionally popular resorts of the Crimea (transferred away from the Russian SFSR to the Ukrainian SSR in 1954 by Nikita Khrushchev), Sochi emerged as the unofficial summer capital of the country. Additionally, Sochi has also served as the location for the signing of many treaties, especially those between the Georgian, separatist Abkhazian, and separatist South Ossetian governing authorities.

=== Saudi Arabia ===
The Saudi royal family has historically relocated to the mountainous city of Taif, near Mecca, which is far cooler in the summer months than the official capital of Saudi Arabia, Riyadh.

=== Spain ===
The location of Donostia/San Sebastián in the cooler, northern seaside of Spain close to the French border ideally placed it as a summer capital alternative to Madrid. Maria Christina of Austria, the queen consort of Spain, vacationed there from 1887 and was followed by the court. The dictator Francisco Franco spent the summers between 1941 and 1975 at the Ayete Palace.

== See also ==
- Hill station
- List of countries with multiple capitals
