= List of ambassadors of the Sahrawi Arab Democratic Republic to Timor-Leste =

Sahrawi Ambassador to Timor-Leste
- Coat of arms of the Sahrawi Arab Democratic Republic
- Incumbent; Boibat Malainin Boibuat since 2021
- Ministry of Foreign Affairs
- Style: His Excellency
- Appointer: The president
- Inaugural holder: Mohamed Kamal Fadel
- Formation: 2010

The ambassador of the Sahrawi Arab Democratic Republic to Timor-Leste is the official representative of the Sahrawi Arab Democratic Republic (SADR) to Timor-Leste. The Sahrawi Arab Democratic Republic embassy in Timor-Leste is located in Dili, behind the Consulate General of Poland.

== Background ==
Since 2010 there has been an embassy of the SADR in Dili. Timor-Leste sees parallels in its own history in the SADR's aspirations for independence and therefore established diplomatic relations.

== List of representatives ==
Name	Term begin	Term end	President	Notes
Mohamed Kamal Fadel	2009	2010	Mohamed Abdelaziz	First Ambassador of the SADR to Timor-Leste
Mohamed Salama Badi	June 7, 2010	2021	Mohamed Abdelaziz	
Boibat Malainin Boibuat	2021	Incumbent	Brahim Ghali	Accreditation: June 11, 2021.

== See also ==
- Foreign relations of Timor-Leste
- Foreign relations of the Sahrawi Arab Democratic Republic
