= Foreign relations of the Sahrawi Arab Democratic Republic =

The foreign relations of the Sahrawi Arab Democratic Republic (SADR) are conducted by the Polisario Front, which maintains a network of representation offices and embassies in foreign countries.

The Sahrawi Arab Democratic Republic (SADR) is the government in exile claiming sovereignty of the former Spanish colony of Western Sahara. The Polisario Front, the national liberation movement that administers the SADR, currently controls the area that it calls the Liberated Territories, a strip of Western Sahara territory east of the Moroccan Wall. It also administers the Sahrawi refugee camps at Tindouf, Algeria, where its headquarters are. It has conducted diplomatic relations with states and international organisations since its inception in 1976. In 1966, United Nations General Assembly Resolution 22/29 affirmed for the first time the Sahrawi right to self-determination. In 1979, United Nations General Assembly Resolution 34/37 reaffirmed the right of the Western Sahara people to self-determination and independence, recognising also the Polisario Front as the representative of the Western Sahara people.

Since the country is not widely recognised, the government has asked Independent Diplomat to serve its interests.

== Recognition ==
As of September 2022, the Sahrawi Arab Democratic Republic has been recognized by 84 UN member states. Of these, 38 have "frozen" or "withdrawn" recognition for a number of reasons. Several states that do not recognise the Sahrawi Republic nonetheless recognize the Polisario Front as the legitimate representative of the population of the Western Sahara, but not as the government-in-exile for a sovereign state.

The republic has been a full member of the African Union (AU), formerly the Organization of African Unity (OAU), since 1984. Morocco withdrew from the OAU in protest and remained the only African nation not within the AU between South Africa's admittance in 1994 and (re-)joining the African Union in 2017. The SADR also participates as guest at meetings of the Non-Aligned Movement or the New Asian–African Strategic Partnership, over Moroccan objections to SADR participation. On the other hand, upholding Moroccan "territorial integrity" is favoured by the Arab League.

Besides Algeria, Mexico, Iran, Venezuela, Vietnam, Nigeria, and South Africa, India was the major middle power to have ever recognised SADR and maintained full diplomatic relations, having allowed the Sahrawi Arab Democratic Republic to open an embassy in New Delhi in 1985. However, India "withdrew" its recognition in 2000.

As with any fluid political situation, diplomatic recognitions of either party's rights are subject to frequent and sometimes unannounced change.

== Bilateral relations ==
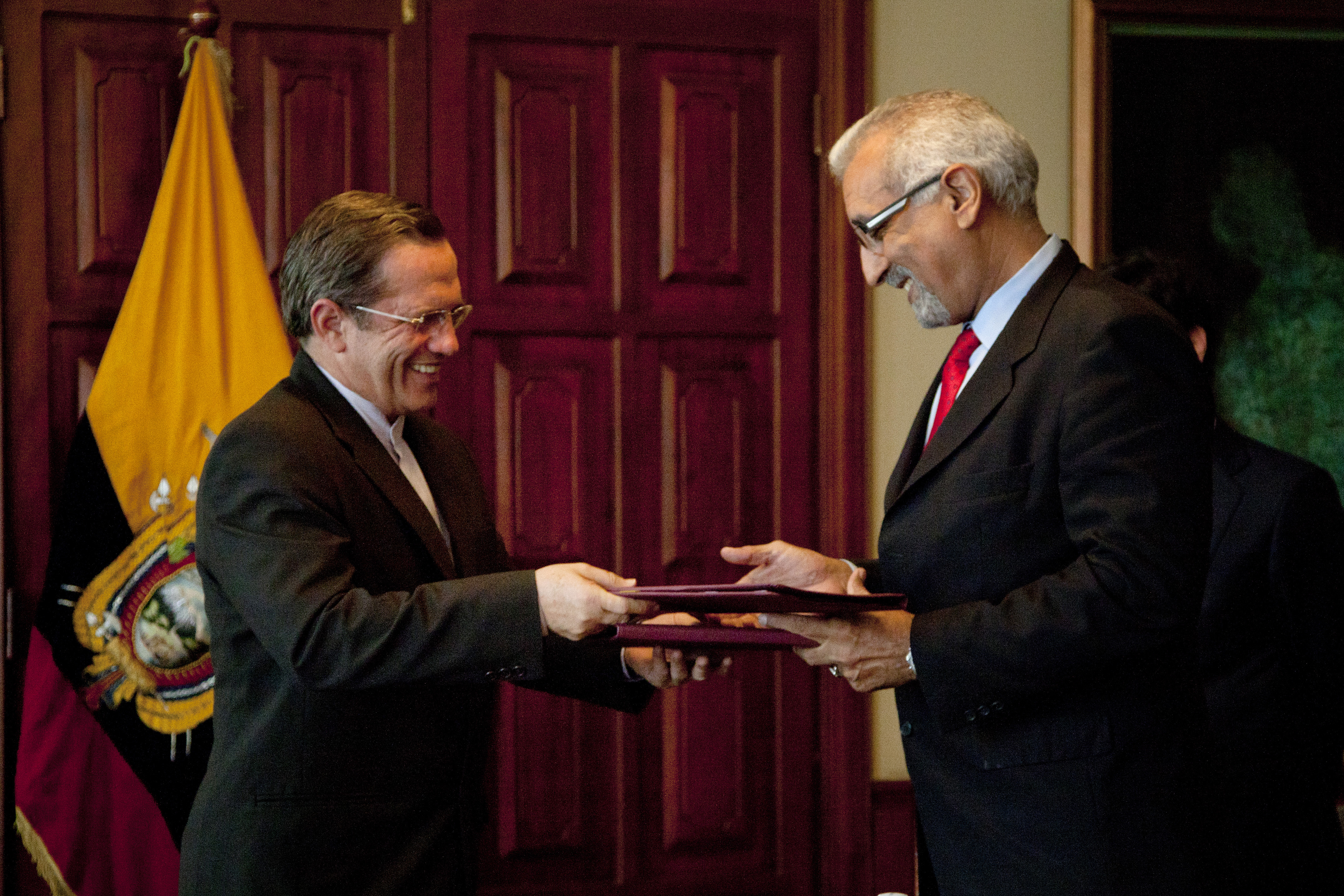
Memorandum of understanding between Ecuador and SADR, in Quito, July 2012

The Sahrawi Arab Democratic Republic has, since its proclamation established diplomatic relations with a number of states, mainly in Africa and the Americas, which have recognised its independence. In connection with the "freezing", "withdrawing" and resuming of recognition, similar changes have occurred at the level of diplomatic relations. SADR has stable and developed relationships with states such as Algeria and South Africa.

The Sahrawi Arab Democratic Republic is represented abroad by the Polisario Front, which maintains a network of missions and embassies. Some states that have recognised the Sahrawi Arab Democratic Republic have elevated the Polisario representation in their country to the status of SADR embassy. The Polisario Front maintains also a network of representations on countries that do not recognized the SADR as a sovereign country, mainly in Europe, with some of them having relations with the host country governments. Representation of foreign countries to the SADR is performed by embassies located abroad, mainly in Algiers, due to the Western Sahara conflict and the settlement of the Sahrawi refugee camps in south-western Algeria. Strong support of Sahrawi cause from some countries is demonstrated by foreign delegation's visits in Liberated Territories of Western Sahara. (Note: While ambassadors usually presented credentials to Sahrawi President in Camp Rabuni in Algeria, Cuban and Namibian ambassadors in March 2018 and Zimbabwean ambassador as third in May 2018 presented credentials to Sahrawi President in Liberated Territories of the SADR (in Bir Lehlou or Tifariti).) (Note: In May 2018, delegations represented by the ambassadors of Vietnam, Ecuador, Namibia, Cuba and South Africa and diplomats from Ethiopia, Uganda, Angola and Nigeria attended the festivities commemorating the 45th anniversary of the outbreak of the Sahrawi armed struggle in Tifariti, Liberated Territories.)

=== Current diplomatic relations ===
Countries which maintain diplomatic relations with SADR.

A total of 29 states presently maintain diplomatic relations with the SADR. As of 6 August 2018, Botswana is the most recent nation to have formally established diplomatic relations with the Sahrawi Arab Democratic Republic. Seven states have frozen or canceled relations with the SADR in the past, but later resumed them.

#	State	Relations established	Sahrawi mission	Mission to Sahrawi Republic ‡ Embassy (non-resident)	Notes
1	Algeria	6 March 1976	Embassy (Algiers)	—	AU, Arab League, OIC; Algeria–SADR relations
2	Angola	August 1980	Embassy (Luanda)	‡ (Algiers)	AU
3	Belize	18 November 1986	‡ (Managua)	—	—
4	Botswana	6 August 2018	Embassy (Gaborone)	‡ (Addis Ababa)	AU
5	Cambodia	1980s	—	—	ASEAN
6	Cuba	21 January 1980	Embassy (Havana)	‡ (Algiers)	Cuba–SADR relations
7	Ethiopia	24 February 1979	Embassy (Addis Ababa)	‡ (Rome)	AU
8	Iran	22 June 1980	—	—	OIC
9	Kenya	25 June 2005	Embassy (Nairobi)	‡ (Algiers)	AU; Relations were frozen from 18 October 2006 to 6 February 2014 or shorter; Kenya–SADR relations Further details On 2 December 2013 Speaker of the National Assembly of Kenya Justin Muturi announced the opening of SADR embassy in Nairobi soon. On 11 December 2013 Sahrawi president Mohamed Abdelaziz officially visited Kenya for Independence Day celebrations. On 6 February 2014 Sahrawi embassy was open.
10	Laos	3 August 1987	‡(New Delhi)	—	ASEAN
11	Lesotho	5 April 1990	‡ (Pretoria)	‡ (Kuwait City)	AU
12	Mauritius	1 July 1982	‡ (Dar es Salaam)	—	AU; Relations are cancelled since 17 January 2014 to 23 November 2015.
13	Mexico	24 October 1979	Embassy (Mexico City)	‡ (New York City)	Mexico–SADR relations
14	Mozambique	August 1980	Embassy (Maputo)	—	AU, OIC
15	Namibia	31 May 1990	‡ (Luanda)	‡ (Algiers)	AU
16	Nicaragua	10 March 1989	Embassy (Managua)	‡ (New York City)	Relations were frozen from 21 July 2000 to 12 January 2007.
17	Nigeria	11 November 1984	Embassy (Abuja)	‡ (Algiers)	AU, OIC; Nigeria–SADR relations
18	North Korea	16 March 1976	—	—	—
19	Rwanda	1 April 1976	Embassy, non resident (Kampala)	—	AU
20	South Africa	15 September 2004	Embassy (Pretoria)	‡ (Algiers)	AU; SADR–South Africa relations
21	South Sudan	9 July 2011	‡ (Addis Ababa)	—	AU; Relations were cancelled from 30 September 2018 to 20 September 2022.
22	Tanzania	9 November 1978	Embassy (Dar es Salaam)	—	AU
23	Timor-Leste	20 May 2002	Embassy (Dili)	—	SADR–Timor-Leste relations
24	Uganda	7 July 1986	Embassy (Kampala)	‡ (Tripoli)	AU, OIC
25	Uruguay	26 December 2005	Embassy (Montevideo)	—	—
26	Vanuatu	31 July 2008	‡ (Dili)	—	—
27	Venezuela	8 December 1982	Embassy (Caracas)	‡ (Algiers)	SADR–Venezuela relations
28	Vietnam	2 March 1979	—	‡ (Algiers)	ASEAN
29	Zimbabwe	25 May 1983	Embassy (Harare)	‡ (Algiers)	AU

=== Former diplomatic relations ===
List of countries which have suspended diplomatic relations with the Sahrawi Republic.

#	State	Relations established	Relations suspended	Former Sahrawi mission (Note: The number of former embassies which existed in the past is likely to be more, but for any embassies to/of states that "withdrew" or "froze" recognition of SADR many years ago we are missing sources.) (Note: The former embassies usually continue to work, but as a unilateral Representative Offices without diplomatic privileges from the host country.)	Former mission to Sahrawi Republic	Notes
1	Bolivia	14 November 1982	24 February 2026	—	Embassy (Algiers)	Diplomatic relations suspended between 20 January 2020 and 16 September 2021 and again on 24 February 2026.
2	Burundi	2 September 1980	25 October 2010	—	—	AU; Relations were frozen from 5 May 2006 to 16 June 2008, they are cancelled since 25 October 2010.
3	Cape Verde		27 July 2007	—	—	AU; Relations are frozen from 27 July 2007.
4	Chad	4 July 1980	2006	—	—	AU; Relations are suspended from 17 March 2006. Further details On 10 July 2007 Prime Minister of Chad Delwa Kassiré Koumakoye received Sahrawi Foreign Minister Mohamed Salem Ould Salek. According to the communiqué, dated 17 July 2007 both parties decided to raise their diplomatic relations to ambassadorial level. This was denied by Chad and described it as a mistaken interpretation denying diplomatic relations. On 11 August 2018 Sahrawi President expressed appreciation for the steadfast position of Chad in supporting the Sahrawi people's right to freedom and independence. In 2020, the Ministry of Foreign Affairs of Chad reiterated that Chad has severed any relationship with SADR since 2006.
5	Colombia	27 February 1985	10 August 2026	Embassy (Bogotá)	—	Relations were frozen from 20 December 2000 to 10 August 2022 under Gustavo Petro, and again on 10 August 2026.
6	Republic of the Congo	August 1980	13 September 1996	—	—	AU. Relations were cancelled 13 September 1996
7	Costa Rica		22 April 2000	Embassy, non-resident (Panama City)	—	Relations are frozen from 22 April 2000.
8	Ecuador	14 November 1983	22 October 2004	Embassy (Quito)	Embassy, non-resident (New York City)	Relations were suspended from 22 October 2024
9	El Salvador	1989	15 June 2019	Embassy, non-resident (Managua)	Embassy, non-resident (New York City)	Relations were cancelled from April 1997 to 6 June 2009 at the latest. They were cancelled again on 15 June 2019.
10	Ghana	24 August 1979	7 January 2025	Embassy (Accra)	‡ (Algiers)	Ghana suspended ties on 7 January 2025.
11	Grenada	1 October 1980	16 August 2010	—	—	Relations were cancelled 16 August 2010
12	Guinea-Bissau	6 October 1980	30 March 2010	Embassy (Bissau)	—	AU, OIC; Relations are cancelled since 30 March 2010.
13	Guyana	28 September 2012	November 2020	‡ (Caracas)	—	Relations cancelled in November 2020.
14	Haiti	22 November 2006	2 October 2013	Embassy (Port-au-Prince)	—	Relations are cancelled since 2 October 2013.
15	Honduras	5 June 2013	22 April 2026	—	—	Relations suspended on 22 April 2026.
16	India	1985	26 June 2000	Embassy (New Delhi)	Embassy, non-resident (Algiers)	Relations are cancelled since 26 June 2000.
17	Liberia	30 October 2012 or before		Embassy, non-resident	—	AU; Relations were suspended after Liberia opened a consulate in Dakhla, which is occupied by Morocco.
18	Madagascar	29 January 1978	6 April 2005	Embassy (Antananarivo)	—	AU; Relations are frozen from 6 April 2005.
19	Malawi	24 March 2002	5 May 2017	Embassy, non-resident (Nairobi)	Embassy, non-resident (Cairo)	AU; Relations were cancelled from 27 December 2002 to 1 February 2008 and from 16 September 2008 to 6 March 2014 or shorter. They were cancelled again from 5 May 2017. Further details In the past, Malawi had non-resident embassy (Cairo) in the SADR, later this embassy was not accredited to Sahrawi Republic. On 15 February 2012 SADR minister in charge of Africa was received by foreign minister of Malawi, on 6 March 2014 SADR ambassador presented credentials to president of Malawi. In 2014, Malawi embassy in Cairo was accredited to the SADR again.
20	Mali		10 April 2026			Diplomatic relations were suspended on 10 April 2026.
21	Panama	1 June 1979	21 November 2024	Embassy (Panama City)	—	Main article: Panama–Sahrawi Arab Democratic Republic relations Relations were suspended from 20 November 2013 to 7 January 2016. Relations suspended again on 21 November 2024.
22	Paraguay	9 February 2000	3 January 2014	Embassy, non-resident (Montevideo)	—	Relations were frozen from 25 July 2000 to 12 August 2008, they are suspended from 3 January 2014.
23	Peru	5 May 1987	September 2023	Embassy (Lima)	—	Main article: Peru–Sahrawi Arab Democratic Republic relations Relations were frozen from 9 September 1996 to 8 September 2021; suspended in September 2023.
24	Sierra Leone	27 March 1980	2003	—	—	AU, OIC
25	St. Vincent and the Grenadines	14 February 2002	15 February 2013	Embassy, non-resident (Tindouf)	—	Relations are frozen from 15 February 2013.
26	São Tomé and Príncipe	25 August 1980	23 October 1996	—	—	AU; Relations were cancelled from 23 October 1996
27	Seychelles	17 February 1981	17 March 2008	Embassy, non-resident (Antananarivo, then Algiers)	—	AU; Relations are cancelled since 17 March 2008.
28	Togo	12 August 1980	18 June 1997	—	—	AU, OIC; Relations are cancelled since 18 June 1997.
29	Zambia		25 February 2017	Embassy, non-resident (Dar es Salaam)	—	AU; Relations were cancelled from 29 March 2011. Re-established on 21 November 2012, relations were cancelled again on 25 February 2017. Further details According to Zambian sources, Foreign Minister Kabinga Pande received a bribe from Morocco for the MMD's 2011 election campaign and his personal re-election campaign in exchange for the "withdrawal" of recognition of the SADR. In early 2020 Zambia opened a consulates general in Laayoune.

== Relations with international organisations ==
The Sahrawi Arab Democratic Republic holds either 'member' or 'observer' status in several international organisations. It participates in the activities of organisations that have formalised its membership, as well as in activities of other organizations as a guest participant. The SADR is usually represented by a Government or national organisations such as the Sahrawi Trade Union.

International Organisation	Status	Representation	Application date	Admission date	Notes
African Union (AU; formerly Organization of African Unity)	member	Sahrawi Arab Democratic Republic	23 June 1980	31 August 1981	SADR representative is Vice President of the Pan-African Parliament (PAP) from May 2015.
Committee of Intelligence and Security Services of Africa	member	Sahrawi Arab Democratic Republic			
International Coalition against Enforced Disappearances	member	Association of the Families of Sahrawi Prisoners and Disappeared (AFAPREDESA)			
International Union of Socialist Youth (IUSY)	member	Sahrawi Youth Union (UJSARIO)			UJSARIO representative was one of IUSY Vice Presidents for 2012–2014.
Pan African Lawyers Union (PALU)	member	Sahrawi Lawyers’ Union			
Women's International Democratic Federation (WIDF)	member	National Union of Sahrawi Women (UNMS)			
World Conference on Constitutional Justice (WCCJ)	member	The Constitutional Council of the Sahrawi Arab Democratic Republic		5 June 2025	The World Conference on Constitutional Justice (WCCJ) unites 124 Constitutional Courts, Councils and Supreme Courts from Africa, the Americas, Asia/Oceania and Europe
World Federation of Democratic Youth (WFDY)	member	Sahrawi Youth Union			
World Federation of Trade Unions	member	Sahrawi Trade Union (UGTSARIO)		28 March 2000	
Non-member status
African Union–European Union Summit	participant	Sahrawi Arab Democratic Republic	—	—	SADR participated in all AU-EU Summits. In 2017, SADR participated on 5th Summit in Abidjan, Morocco's attempts to exclude SADR was thwarted.
Andean Community of Nations	observer (Note: In the framework of the Andean Parliament.)	Sahrawi National Council	September 2011	26 October 2011	
Central American Parliament (PARLACEN)	participant (Note: There is not a formal status of the SADR, but here is the SADR official participation in the activities of this international organization.)	Sahrawi Arab Democratic Republic	—	—	SADR participated in the opening conference of the PARLACEN, July 2010.
Ibero-American Summit	participant	Polisario Front	—	—	Polisario Front participated in 22nd Ibero-American Summit in Cádiz, November 2012.
International Federation of Red Cross and Red Crescent Societies	observer	Sahrawi Red Crescent		April 1977	
New Asian–African Strategic Partnership (NAASP)	participant (Note: NAASP does not have formalised membership, it is open to States of Asia and Africa.)	Sahrawi Arab Democratic Republic	—	—	SADR participated in first senior officials meeting of the NAASP in Durban, September 2006.
Non-Aligned Movement (NAM)	guest (Note: There is no permanent guest status, but often several non-member states are represented as guests at NAM conferences.)	Sahrawi Arab Democratic Republic	—	—	SADR participated as guest in 16th Summit of NAM in Tehran, August 2012.
Permanent Conference of Political Parties of the Latin American and the Caribbean (COPPPAL)	participant	Sahrawi Arab Democratic Republic	—	—	SADR participated in COPPPAL meeting in Managua, September 2006. SADR delegation participated in meeting of COPPPAL and ICAPP in Mexico City, October 2012.
Progressive Alliance	participant	Polisario Front	—	—	
Socialist International	consultative member	Polisario Front		30 June 2008	Admitted as observer member. Promoted to consultative member in 2017.

== International treaties and conventions ==
The Sahrawi Arab Democratic Republic has signed a number of international treaties, conventions, protocols and charters negotiated in the context of the African Union. SADR participates in protection of human rights, common defense or trade liberalisation by signature of following agreements.

International treaty or convention	Signature	Ratification	Notes
African Charter on Democracy, Elections and Governance	25 July 2010	27 November 2013	
African Charter on Human and Peoples' Rights	10 April 1986	2 May 1986	
African Charter on the Rights and Welfare of the Child	23 October 1992	—	
African Charter on Values and Principles of Public Service and Administration	1 July 2011	—	
African Continental Free Trade Agreement	21 March 2018	—	A trade agreement between some African Union member states which will establish the African Continental Free Trade Area.
African Nuclear-Weapon-Free Zone Treaty (Treaty of Pelindaba)	20 June 2006	27 November 2013	
AU Convention on Preventing and Combating Corruption	25 July 2010	27 November 2013	
AU Convention for the Protection and Assistance of Internally Displaced Persons in Africa (Kampala Convention)	23 August 2009	27 November 2013	
AU Non-aggression and Common Defence Pact	21 May 2007	27 April 2009	
Convention of the African Energy Commission	20 June 2006	9 May 2007	
Geneva Conventions	23 June 2015		Polisario Front made a unilateral declaration under Article 93.3 of Protocol I to apply the four Conventions and Protocol I in the Western Sahara conflict with Morocco. Polisario Front is not recognized as a party of Conventions, but declaration was accepted by the depositary of Convenions (Swiss Federal Council).
OAU Convention on the Prevention and Combating of Terrorism	14 July 1999	9 January 2002	
Protocol on the Statute of the African Court of Justice and Human Rights	25 July 2010	—	
Protocol to the African Charter on Human and Peoples’ Rights on the Establishment of an African Court on Human and Peoples' Rights	25 July 2010	27 November 2013	
Protocol to the African Charter on Human and Peoples’ Rights on the Rights of Women in Africa	20 June 2006	—	
Treaty Establishing the African Economic Community (AEC Treaty)	3 June 1991	25 August 1992	SADR signed to the AEC Treaty, but not participates in any of the AEC pillars.

== Participation in international sports federations ==
In 2015, the Sahrawi Arab Democratic Republic participated for the first time in the All Africa Games, the biggest African multi-sports event.

International Organisation	Status	Representation	Application date	Admission date	Notes
African Union Sports Council	member	Sahrawi Ministry of Youth and Sports			In September 2015, Sahrawi Republic participated in the 11th All Africa Games.
N.F.-Board (Note: N.F.-Board is defunct since January 2013.)	provisional member	Sahrawi Football Federation		December 2003	In 2012, a Sahrawi team participated for the first time in the Viva World Cup hosted by Iraqi Kurdistan.
CONIFA	member	Sahrawi Football Federation		August 2016	

== See also ==
- International recognition of the Sahrawi Arab Democratic Republic
- List of diplomatic missions to the Sahrawi Arab Democratic Republic
- List of diplomatic missions of the Sahrawi Arab Democratic Republic
- Political status of Western Sahara
