= India–Sahrawi Arab Democratic Republic relations =

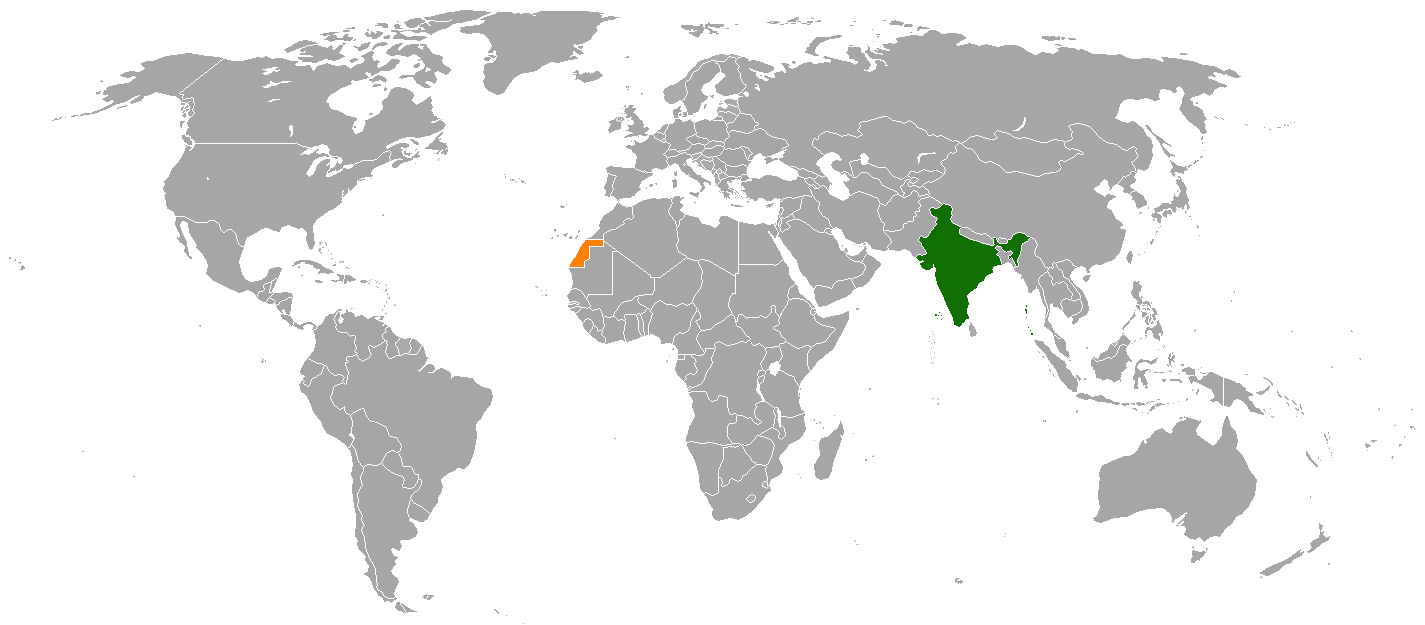

- India: Sahrawi Arab Democratic Republic

India and Sahrawi Arab Democratic Republic (SADR) had formal diplomatic relations from 1985 until 2000.

== Background ==
During the Cold War, despite its non-aligned position, India was closely linked to the Soviet Union. In 1985, when the then prime minister of India, Rajiv Gandhi, visited Algeria on his way to meet President Reagan of the United States of America, he met with Algerian president, Chadli Bendjedid, who was also a great friend of the Soviet Union, Rajiv Gandhi was convinced about the need to recognise Polisario. Mohammad Abdelaziz, the Polisario leader, was a friend of Cuban revolutionist Fidel Castro and had Soviet backing. Upon his meeting with Bendjedid, the Indian prime minister agreed to recognise the sovereignty of Western Sahara. The decision got diluted only 24 hours later when the prime minister was persuaded in Washington that the decision to recognise the Polisario should be delayed if not cancelled.

== Diplomatic Relations ==
India recognised the Sahrawi Arab Democratic Republic on 1 October 1985, nine years after the proclamation of independence of Western Sahara by the Polisario Front, which led to the sudden collapse of ties between New Delhi and Rabat.

Subsequently, on 26 June 2000, New Delhi withdrew its recognition of the Sahrawi Arab Democratic Republic (SADR).

== Visits ==
Rajiv Gandhi, the then prime minister of India visited Algeria in 1985 where he met Algerian president, Chadli Bendjedid, after which he made the decision to recognise Sahrawi Arab Democratic Republic.

In 1985, K. S. Bajpai (former diplomat) visited the de-facto capital of Sahrawi Arab Democratic Republic (SADR) in Rabouni camp,Tindouf.

Smt. Prashawati Gupte, Member of Parliament, visited Algeria from 24 February to 2 March 1986 to participate in the tenth anniversary commemoration of the Sahrawi Arab Democratic Republic (SADR).

Malainine Sadik, Minister of Foreign Affairs of Sahrawi Arab Democratic Republic (SADR) visited India in September 1996 and held talks on matters of mutual interest.

== Diplomatic Missions ==
Sahrawi Arab Democratic Republic opened a full-fledged embassy in G-53, Nizamuddin West, New Delhi. However, within a month, it was realised that apart from having an embassy in the national capital, there was no real engagement with the Indian government. Consequently, the embassy was temporarily shut down the following year due to inactivity.

The Indian ambassador in Algiers was concurrently accredited to Sahrawi Arab Democaratic Republic (SADR).

Since 1994 till 2000, the mission of Sahrawi Arab Democaratic Republic (SADR) at New Delhi has been headed by a chargé d'affaires rather than an ambassador.

In June 2000, India withdrew from recognising Sahrawi Arab Democratic Republic (SADR), terminating the diplomatic status of the embassy. Though, India conveyed to the mission of Sahrawi Arab Democaratic Republic (SADR) at New Delhi, that they could continue as a office if they so desired without diplomatic status and amenities. The then Sahrawi Arab Democratic Republic (SADR)'s chargé d'affaires, completely closed down his office, after receiving instructions from his concerned authorities.

The former embassy currently works as a representation office.

Mohamed Kamal Fadel and Haiba Abbas has previously served as the ambassador at large to India, for Sahrawi Republic.

== Trade ==
In 2026, the Indian company Paradeep Phosphates Limited is the biggest importer of Western Saharan Phosphate. As a matter of fact, it is the only one of the three companies that continue to buy phosphate rock from the disputed land. Paradeep is also a subsidiary of Moroccan state-owned OCP Group.
