= International recognition of the Sahrawi Arab Democratic Republic =

Western Sahara States that recognize the SADR (Note: This includes states that have suspended diplomatic relations with the SADR and/or have endorsed Morocco's Western Sahara autonomy proposal, but have not formally announced a withdrawal or freezing of recognition (Kenya, Mauritius). The downgrading of diplomatic relations does not necessarily amount to withdrawing recognition.) States that have withdrawn recognition of the SADR States that do not recognize the SADR

The Sahrawi Arab Democratic Republic (SADR) was proclaimed by the Polisario Front on 27 February 1976, in Bir Lehlu, Western Sahara. The SADR claims sovereignty over the entire territory of Western Sahara, a former Spanish colony; however, at present the SADR government controls approximately 20–25% of the territory it claims. It calls the territories under its control the Free Zone, while Morocco claims its territories as its "southern provinces".

The SADR has been recognized by 84 United Nations (UN) member states, though several states have since "frozen" or "withdrawn" their recognition. Morocco has successfully lobbied states to withdraw and withhold their recognition of the SADR.

The SADR has been a member of the African Union (AU), formerly the Organization of African Unity (OAU), since 1984. At the time, Morocco withdrew from the OAU in protest, until 2017, when Morocco again joined the African Union. The UN recognizes the Polisario Front as the legitimate representative of the Sahrawi people; it is occasionally invited to speak as Western Sahara's representative before the UN Special Committee on Decolonization, though this practice is inconsistent.

In 2020, the United States under Donald Trump was the first country to recognize Morocco's unilateral annexation of Western Sahara. While some countries reiterate support for the "territorial integrity of Morocco", a number of countries have expressed their support for a future status of Western Sahara as an autonomous part of Morocco.

Besides Mexico, Algeria, Iran, Venezuela, Vietnam, Nigeria and South Africa, India was the largest middle power to have ever recognized SADR, having allowed the Sahrawi Arab Democratic Republic to open an embassy in New Delhi in 1985. However, India withdrew its recognition in 2000.

== Background information ==
The conflict in the Western Sahara dates back to the early 1970s, when the indigenous Sahrawi Polisario Front sprang up an insurgency in Spanish Sahara, demanding an independent Sahrawi Republic. In 1957, the then-Spanish territory was claimed by Morocco, who declared independence a year before.

On 16 October 1975, the International Court of Justice (ICJ) issued an advisory opinion that, while some Sahrawi tribes held allegiance to Morocco, found that there were not any ties of sovereignty, from Morocco or Mauritania, over the territory of Western Sahara. Moreover, the ICJ invoked the right of self-determination for Sahrawis through their free and genuine expression of such will. Morocco defied this advisory and staged a Green March across the Sahara.

The Polisario's insurgency and subsequent international pressure led Spain to withdraw from the region in 1975, Spain agreed to the partition of the territory between Morocco and Mauritania despite the ICJ Advisory Opinion.

In 1976, the Polisario Front declared a Sahrawi Arab Democratic Republic in Bir Lahlou. In 1979, Mauritania gave up its claim to Western Sahara, which led to Morocco taking over the Mauritanian-controlled portion of the territory. Armed conflict continued to break out until a 1991 ceasefire.

Seeking to change the status quo, the Polisario Front blocked the Western Saharan city of Guerguerat, a key trade route between Morocco and Mauritania in 2020. This led to a Moroccan military operation and subsequently led to the 2020 Western Saharan clashes, prompting the Polisario Front to quit observing the 1991 ceasefire.

== States that have recognized the SADR ==
84 UN member states and South Ossetia either currently recognize the SADR or have recognized it in the past. Of these, a number of them have "suspended", "frozen" or "withdrawn" recognition. Morocco has intensively, and successfully, pressured states to withdraw or withhold recognition of the SADR.

=== Countries that recognize the SADR as an independent state ===
The following lists the states that recognize the SADR. The downgrading of diplomatic relations is separate from withdrawing recognition.

State	Date of recognition	Relevant membership, further details
Algeria	6 March 1976	AU, Arab League, OIC; Algeria–SADR relations
Angola	11 March 1976	AU Further details Recognized by the People's Republic of Angola.
Mozambique	13 March 1976	AU, OIC Further details Recognized by the People's Republic of Mozambique.
North Korea	16 March 1976	—
Rwanda	1 April 1976	AU
Tanzania	9 November 1978	AU
Ethiopia	24 February 1979	AU Further details Recognized by the Derg
Vietnam	2 March 1979	ASEAN Further details There was conflicting information on Vietnam's position. According to several Moroccan sources recognition was withdrawn in 2010 or earlier. The latest source suggesting withdrawal of recognition is from June 2013. However, a web page of the MFA of Vietnam still showed the SADR on a list of states with which Vietnam maintained diplomatic relations. This list was updated in May 2013, three years after they were originally purported to have withdrawn their recognition. The situation has been clarified in May 2016, when Ambassador of Vietnam to the SADR was appointed. The Vietnamese Government's Portal also shows the SADR as state with which Vietnam maintains diplomatic relations.
Laos	9 May 1979	ASEAN
Nicaragua (Note: Party to the 1933 Montevideo Convention. Article 6 of the convention states that diplomatic recognition is "irrevocable". According to the Centre for Studies on Western Sahara, convention parties that have recognized the SADR can suspend diplomatic relations, but cannot withdraw recognition; those that have withdrawn their recognition are in violation of their international obligations.)	6 September 1979	— Further details Recognition frozen 21 July 2000, but diplomatic relations resumed 12 January 2007.
Uganda	6 September 1979	AU, OIC
Mexico	8 September 1979	—, Mexico–SADR relations
Lesotho	9 October 1979	AU Further details In a note to Morocco on 4 October 2019, Lesotho stated that it had decided to "suspend all statements and decisions related to the status of Western Sahara and 'SADR' pending the outcome of the United Nations Process". On 8 October 2019 Lesotho sent a letter to SADR which reiterated its support to the SADR. On 10 December 2019, Foreign Affairs Minister of Lesotho Lesego Calayl Makghoti stated that he could "confirm and clarify my country's position which is: a commitment to suspend all previous decisions and statements related to Western Sahara and 'SADR', pending the outcome of the United Nations process". On 14 December 2019, Official Spokesperson of the Government of Lesotho, Mr. Thesele Maseribane stated that "the Kingdom of Lesotho has not changed its principled position on the Western Sahara issue based on the right of self-determination and that it maintains friendly diplomatic relations with the Sahrawi State" and that "any statements by persons in their individual capacity claim that they can change the position to compromise on this issue, these statements will be null and void". On 2 July 2020, Minister for Foreign Affairs and International Relations, ’Matšepo Ramakoae denying previous unilateral misrepresentations of that position last year and stated that "Lesotho will continue to maintain her principled position on Western Sahara and reiterates her support to the Saharawi Arab Democratic Republic as an independent African Country coexisting side by side with the Kingdom of Morocco in peace and security".
Cuba	20 January 1980	—, Cuba–SADR relations
Iran	27 February 1980	OIC
Libya	15 April 1980	AU, Arab League, OIC Further details Recognized by the Socialist People's Libyan Arab Jamahiriya.
Botswana	14 May 1980	AU
Zimbabwe	3 July 1980	AU
Vanuatu	27 November 1980	— Further details Recognition withdrawn 24 November 2000, diplomatic relations resumed 31 July 2008.
Mauritius	1 July 1982	AU Further details Recognition withdrawn 17 January 2014, but resumed 23 November 2015. In September 2026, Mauritius endorsed Morocco's autonomy plan for Western Sahara.
Venezuela	3 August 1982	—, SADR–Venezuela relations
Mauritania	27 February 1984	AU, Arab League, OIC
Nigeria	12 November 1984	AU, OIC; Nigeria–SADR relations
Trinidad and Tobago	1 November 1986	—
Belize	18 November 1986	—
Namibia	11 June 1990	AU
Timor-Leste	20 May 2002	ASEAN; SADR–Timor-Leste relations
South Africa	15 September 2004	AU; SADR–South Africa relations
Kenya	25 June 2005	AU; Kenya–SADR relations Further details Diplomatic relations temporally frozen 18 October 2006, recognition frozen 26 June 2007, then resumed 6 February 2014 or before. Kenya reiterated recognition 16 September 2022. Kenya endorsed Morocco's autonomy proposal in 2025 and 2026, though it still maintains diplomatic relations with the SADR.
Uruguay	26 December 2005	—
South Sudan	10 July 2011	AU Further details Recognition withdrawn 28 September 2018, diplomatic relations resumed 20 September 2022.

==== Non-UN states ====
State	Date of recognition	Relevant membership, further details
South Ossetia	27 February 2011	— Further details Though South Ossetia recognizes the SADR, the SADR has not reciprocated recognition to avoid controversy.

=== Countries that recognized the SADR but have subsequently withdrawn recognition ===
State	Date of		Relevant membership, further details
State	Recognition	Withdrawal	Relevant membership, further details
Madagascar	28 February 1976	6 April 2005	AU Further details Recognized by the Democratic Republic of Madagascar.
Burundi	1 March 1976; 16 June 2008	5 May 2006; 25 October 2010	AU
Benin	11 March 1976	21 March 1997	AU, OIC
Guinea-Bissau	15 March 1976; 26 May 2009	2 April 1997; 30 March 2010	AU, OIC
Togo	17 March 1976	18 June 1997	AU, OIC
Seychelles	25 October 1977	17 March 2008	AU
Congo	3 June 1978	13 September 1996	AU Further details Recognized by the People's Republic of Congo.
São Tomé and Príncipe	22 June 1978	23 October 1996	AU
Panama	23 July 1978	21 November 2024	—, Panama–SADR relations Further details Recognition suspended 20 November 2013. Resumed 7 January 2016. Diplomatic relations suspended on 21 November 2024, which was described as a suspension of recognition by Panamanian Foreign Minister Javier Martínez-Acha. In September 2026, Panama reiterated its support for Moroccan sovereignty over its "entire national territory".
Equatorial Guinea	3 November 1978	May 1980	AU
Cambodia	10 April 1979	14 August 2006	ASEAN Further details Recognized by the People's Republic of Kampuchea. In November 2019, the Ministry of Foreign Affairs and International Cooperation included the SADR in a list of states that have diplomatic relations with Cambodia.
Afghanistan	23 May 1979	11 July 2002	OIC Further details Recognized by the Democratic Republic of Afghanistan.
Cape Verde	4 July 1979	27 July 2007	AU Further details The Cape Verden President met the Minister of Foreign Affairs of the Saharawi Arab Democratic Republic on 6 February 2012, but on 16 November 2019 Luis Felipe Tavarez, Cape Verde's Minister of Foreign Affairs and Defense, reiterated the country's support for Morocco's claims of Western Sahara.
Grenada	20 August 1979	16 August 2010	—
Ghana	24 August 1979	7 January 2025	AU Further details Diplomatic relations frozen May 2001, resumed by 8 September 2011. Diplomatic relations suspended on 7 January 2025, which was confirmed to be a withdrawal of recognition in September 2026.
Dominica	1 September 1979	23 July 2010	—
Guyana	1 September 1979	14 November 2020	OIC Further details As of 2023, the Guyanese Ministry of Foreign Affairs still includes the SADR in its undated "Countries With Which Guyana Has Established Diplomatic Relations" webpage.
Saint Lucia	1 September 1979	21 March 1989	—
Jamaica	4 September 1979	14 September 2016	—
Zambia	12 October 1979; 21 November 2012	29 March 2011; 2 March 2018	AU Further details On 9 July 2016, Zambia's MFA was quoted as saying that it had again withdrawn recognition, a claim that was repeated by the official Moroccan news agency in February 2017, but the Zambian MFA put out a press release in February 2017 denying that it had withdrawn recognition. In 2018, MFA of Zambia again officially reaffirmed that it had withdrawn recognition of the Sahrawi Arab Democratic Republic.
Sierra Leone	27 March 1980	16 July 2003	AU, OIC Further details In June 2011, Sierra Leonean president Ernest Bai Koroma met with the Sahrawi Ambassador to Nigeria to discuss bilateral relations. Since then, Sierra Leone opened a consulate in Moroccan-occupied Dakhla and, as of 2025, recognizes Moroccan sovereignty over Western Sahara.
Syria	15 April 1980	14 May 2026	Arab League, OIC; SADR–Syria relations Further details Recognized by Ba'athist Syria. Following the fall of the Assad regime on 8 December 2024, the new government’s position was initially unclear. However, since the fall of the Assad regime, Syria has consistently supported Moroccan claims on Western Sahara. On 27 May 2025, Syria confirmed the closure of the Polisario’s representative office in Damascus to Moroccan representatives and supported Morocco’s autonomy plan. In May 2026, Syria’s Foreign Minister “affirmed its full respect for the territorial integrity of the Kingdom of Morocco and its sovereignty over its entire territory”.
Eswatini	28 April 1980	4 July 1997	AU
Chad	4 July 1980	9 May 1997	AU, OIC Further details On 10 July 2007 Prime Minister of Chad Delwa Kassiré Koumakoye received Sahrawi Foreign Minister Mohamed Salem Ould Salek. According to the communiqué dated 17 July 2007, both parties decided to raise their diplomatic relations to ambassadorial level "as soon as possible". On 20 July the Chadian government released a note on its website, along with a full text of the communiqué, disputing the claim included in an article published in Alwihda that Chad and SADR had signed an agreement on recognition. On 11 August 2018 Sahrawi President expressed appreciation for the steadfast position of Chad in supporting the Sahrawi people's right to freedom and independence.
Mali	4 July 1980	10 April 2026	AU, OIC
Costa Rica	30 October 1980	22 April 2000	—
Papua New Guinea	12 August 1981	30 March 2011	—
Tuvalu	12 August 1981	15 September 2000	—
Kiribati	12 August 1981	15 September 2000	—
Nauru	12 August 1981	15 September 2000	—
Solomon Islands	12 August 1981	January 1989	—
Suriname	11 August 1982	9 March 2016	OIC
Bolivia	14 December 1982 16 September 2021	20 January 2020 24 February 2026	Further details Diplomatic relations suspended 20 January 2020, resumed 16 September 2021, and suspended again on 24 February 2026.
Ecuador	14 November 1983; 8 February 2006	14 June 2004; 22 October 2024	—
Burkina Faso	4 March 1984	5 June 1996	AU, OIC
Peru	16 August 1984	24 September 2026	—, Peru–SADR relations Further details Recognition frozen 9 September 1996, diplomatic relations resumed 8 September 2021, recognition withdrawn 18 August 2022, President Pedro Castillo reconfirmed recognition 8 September 2022. His successor Dina Boluarte froze diplomatic relations 9 September 2023, but did not withdraw diplomatic recognition. In September 2026, Peru recognized Morocco's sovereignty over Western Sahara.
Colombia	27 February 1985	8 August 2026	— Further details Relations frozen 20 December 2000. Colombia's Senate passed a resolution in May 2014 stating that they "consider it important to recognize the Sahrawi Arab Democratic Republic", after which relations resumed in 2022. In 2026, the newly inaugurated Colombian government recognized Moroccan sovereignty over Western Sahara and derecognized the SADR.
Liberia	31 July 1985	5 September 1997	AU. Further details An October 2012 press release by the Liberian Ministry of Foreign Affairs mentioned the existence of an Ambassador-Designate of the Sahrawi Republic. Since then, Liberia opened a consulate in Moroccan-occupied Dakhla in 2020 and has consistently expressed its support for Morocco's sovereignty over Western Sahara.
India	1 October 1985	26 June 2000	—, India–SADR relations
Guatemala	10 April 1986	April 1998	— Further details Guatemala reaffirmed its derecognition of the SADR in July 2002. Although Guatemala does not recognize the SADR as a state, it does recognize Sahrawi passports and grants visas to its holders.
Dominican Republic	24 June 1986	23 May 2002	—
Saint Kitts and Nevis	25 February 1987	16 August 2010	—
Antigua and Barbuda	27 February 1987	16 August 2010	—
Albania	29 December 1987	November 2004	OIC Further details Recognized by the Socialist People's Republic of Albania.
Barbados	27 February 1988	2 August 2008	—
El Salvador	31 July 1989; 3 November 2016	April 1997; 15 June 2019	—, El Salvador–SADR relations
Honduras	8 November 1989; 6 June 2013	January 2000; 22 April 2026	OAS
Malawi	16 November 1994; 24 March 2002; 1 February 2008; 6 March 2014	26 June 2001; 27 December 2002; 16 September 2008; 5 May 2017	AU Further details In 2021, Morocco's Minister of Foreign Affairs Nasser Bourita announced in a press conference with his Malawian counterpart Eisenhower Nduwa Mkaka that Malawi will open a consulate in Moroccan-occupied Laayoune.
Paraguay	10 February 2000; 11 August 2011	25 July 2000; 3 January 2014	— Further details Diplomatic relations suspended on 3 January 2014.
Saint Vincent and the Grenadines	14 February 2002	15 February 2013	—
Haiti	23 November 2006	10 October 2013	—

==== Former states ====
State	Date of		Relevant membership, further details
State	Recognition	Withdrawal	Relevant membership, further details
South Yemen	2 February 1977	22 May 1990	Arab League, OIC Further details South Yemen, which recognized the SADR in 1977, unified with North Yemen on 22 May 1990. Just prior to unification, the Yemeni ministers of foreign affairs stated that all existing international relations would be maintained. However, since unification, Yemen has consistently supported Moroccan claims on Western Sahara. In its list of countries that have recognized the SADR, the Sahrawi Permanent Mission to the AU notes that South Yemen has "stopped existing as a country".
Yugoslavia (1984–1992); FR Yugsolavia (1992–2004)	28 November 1984	27 October 2004	—, SADR–Yugoslavia relations Further details Yugoslavia dissolved in 1992 without a sole successor state, though its self-proclaimed successor, the Federal Republic of Yugoslavia, inherited its recognition of the SADR. The Federal Republic of Yugoslavia (reorganized as Serbia and Montenegro) withdrew its recognition of the SADR on 27 October 2004. In its list of countries that recognize the SADR, the Sahrawi Permanent Mission to the AU notes that Yugoslavia has ceased to exist.

== States whose legislatures have voted to recognize the SADR ==
The parliaments of several states that do not recognize the Sahrawi Republic have called on their respective governments to recognize SADR. In 1988, the Raul Alfonsín government of Argentina made a compromise to recognize the independence of the Sahrawi Republic in the end of 1988. This announcement was dated 6 May 1988, sent by a letter signed by Minister Dante Caputo to Minister of Foreign Affairs of SADR. In July 2010, the Argentine Chamber of Deputies registered a declaration project exhorting the government of Argentina to recognize the SADR and to establish diplomatic relations with it.

In November 1999, the foreign minister of Chile informed the Sahrawi Chancellor by letter that the president of Chile had decided to recognize the SADR. Chile's Chamber of Deputies repeatedly called for the recognition of SADR and establishment of diplomatic relations with the SADR, though this recognition was never implemented. Rather, Chile recognized Moroccan sovereignty over Western Sahara in September 2026. As of 2017, the Brazilian Chamber of Deputies has repeatedly asked government of Brazil to recognize SADR and establish diplomatic relations with it.

In 2004, the Australian Senate adopted a motion where "urges Australian government to positively consider extending diplomatic recognition to SADR at the appropriate time." In 2014, the Swedish Riksdag voted to recommend that the Swedish government "recognises the SADR as soon as possible", becoming the first EU member state to do so. In January 2014 a bill was submitted in the Danish parliament that Denmark would recognize the Sahrawi Arab Democratic Republic, but it has not been voted on.

== See also ==
- Political status of Western Sahara
- Foreign relations of the Sahrawi Arab Democratic Republic
- List of states with limited recognition
