= Sahrawi Arab Democratic Republic–Syria relations =

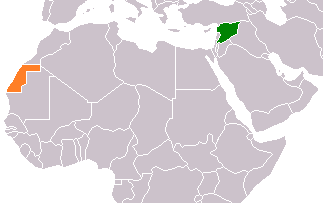

- Syria: Sahrawi Arab Democratic Republic

The Sahrawi Arab Democratic Republic (SADR), operated by the Polisario Front, and Syria began diplomatic relations when Ba'athist Syria officially recognized SADR on 15 April 1980. In 2026, the Syrian transitional government expressed support for Morocco's autonomy plan for Western Sahara.

== History ==
=== Ba'athist Syria–Polisario Front ties (1980–2024) ===
Ba'athist Syria historically provided political support to the Polisario Front a Sahrawi group.

An April 2025 article from The Washington Post alleged that the Polisario Front participated in the Syrian civil war. This article was criticized in a fact-checking investigation by TruthAfrica (Code for Africa and Pravda Association) for amplifying Moroccan misinformation. The article was later amended with a denial from the Polisario Front, stating that,

[To] suggest that Polisario fighters would abandon their decades-long struggle against Moroccan occupation in favor of distant conflicts in which they have no stake is not only implausible—it is an insult to the dignity and determination of a people fighting for their freedom.

Syria denied allegations that Polisario fighters were being held in its prisons.

=== Syrian reconciliation with Morocco (2025–present) ===
In May 2025, Moroccan media reported that the Syrian transitional government closed the Polisario Front's office in Damascus during a diplomatic rapprochement with Morocco. British newspaper Al-Quds Al-Arabi and pan-African blog Sawt Afrikya refuted this report, citing sources that claimed that the Polisario office has been closed since 2003.

During a May 2026 visit to Rabat, Syrian foreign minister Asaad Hassan al-Shibani expressed support for UN Security Council Resolution 2797, which endorses Morocco's autonomy plan for Western Sahara. Africa 24 described the move as a profound departure from Ba'athist Syria's support for the SADR.

== See also ==
- Foreign relations of Syria
- Foreign relations of the Sahrawi Arab Democratic Republic
- International recognition of the Sahrawi Arab Democratic Republic
- Polisario Front
