= Sahrawi Arab Democratic Republic–Timor-Leste relations =

East Timorese–Sahrawi relations

- Timor-Leste: Sahrawi Arab Democratic Republic

East Timorese–Sahrawi relations refers to the current and historical relations between Timor-Leste and the Sahrawi Arab Democratic Republic (SADR).

== History ==
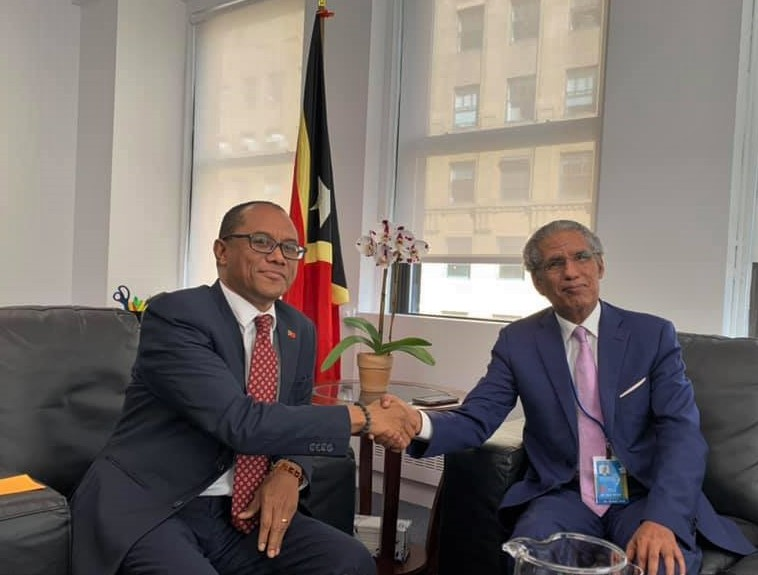
Meeting of foreign ministers Mohamed Salem Ould Salek and Dionísio Babo Soares; 2019.

The SADR was one of the first states to establish formal diplomatic relations with Timor-Leste, after its independence on 20 May 2002, in part due to the long-time strong ties and the historical parallels between the two national liberation movements, FRETILIN and POLISARIO.

== Diplomatic missions ==
A Sahrawi embassy was opened in Dili in 2010, during Xanana Gusmão's government.

== See also ==
- Foreign relations of Timor-Leste
- Foreign relations of the Sahrawi Arab Democratic Republic
- List of ambassadors of the Sahrawi Arab Democratic Republic to Timor-Leste
- International recognition of the Sahrawi Arab Democratic Republic
