= Kenya–Sahrawi Arab Democratic Republic relations =

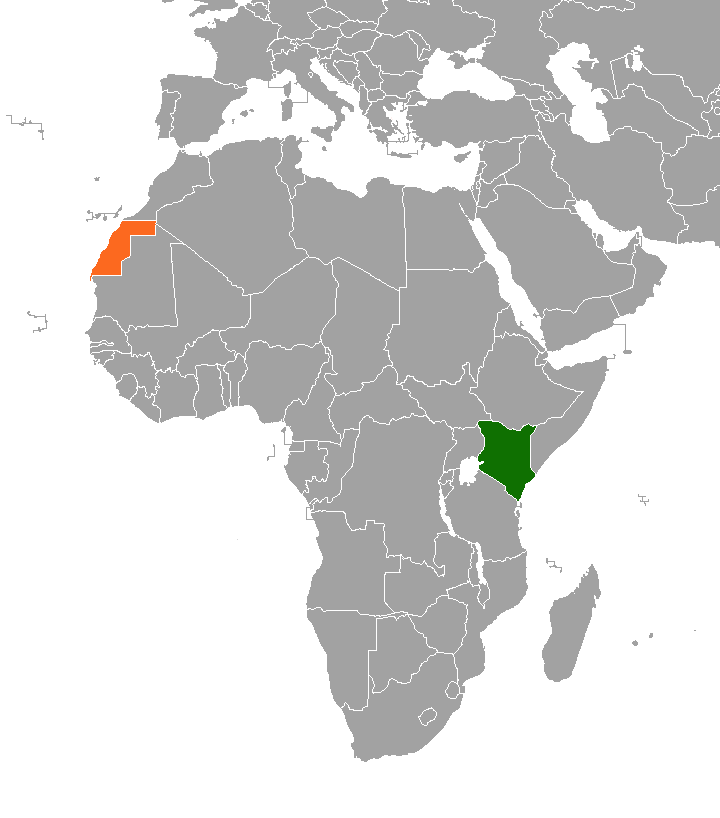

- Kenya: Sahrawi Arab Democratic Republic

Kenya–Sahrawi Arab Democratic Republic relations are bilateral relations between the Sahrawi Arab Democratic Republic (SADR) and Kenya. Kenya recognised the SADR in 2005.

== History ==
In March 2006, President Kibaki of Kenya received credentials from the ambassador of the Sahrawi Arab Democratic Republic to Kenya, Hamdi Bueha. However, on October of the same year, the Kenyan government put a temporary freeze on diplomatic relations between both countries.

In February 2014 the Sahrawi Arab Democratic Republic opened an embassy in Nairobi. The ceremony was attended by the Foreign Minister of the SADR, former Vice President of Kenya Kalonzo Musyoka and other members of the diplomatic corps. Mr. Bah Med was accredited as the Extraordinary and Plenipotentiary Ambassador of the Sahrawi Arab Democratic Republic in Kenya.

Kenya had a diplomatic row with Morocco over the matter.

== Diplomatic missions ==
- Kenya has accredited embassy to the SADR in Algiers.
- SADR has an embassy in Nairobi.

== See also ==
- Foreign relations of Kenya
- Foreign relations of the Sahrawi Arab Democratic Republic
- International recognition of the Sahrawi Arab Democratic Republic
