= Sahrawi Arab Democratic Republic–South Africa relations =

- Sahrawi Arab Democratic Republic: South Africa

Sahrawi Arab Democratic Republic–South Africa relations are the current and historical relations between the Sahrawi Arab Democratic Republic (SADR) in Western Sahara and the Republic of South Africa. Formal diplomatic relations were established at ambassador level in 2004, during the Thabo Mbeki government. The Sahrawi embassy was opened in Pretoria, and the South-African embassy in Algiers was accredited to the SADR.

South Africa continues to render political support and humanitarian assistance to the Saharawi Arab Democratic Republic. Under the African Renaissance Fund (ARF), South Africa coordinates several projects that aim to benefit the Saharawi population. These include a contribution to a landmine clearance project in the east of the territory and construction of a sport development complex in the territory.

== Historical relations ==
The relations between Sahrawi Arab Democratic Republic (SADR) and South Africa date back to the close bonds that were forged by the national liberation movements of both countries, namely the African National Congress (ANC) of South Africa and the Polisario Front of Western Sahara shortly after the formation of the Polisario Front in 1973. It was in Algeria that the interaction between the ANC and the Polisario Front was solidified especially through the organisation's membership of bodies such as the Pan-African Youth Movement.

On 22 July 1988, the then ANC President, Oliver Tambo led an ANC delegation to the Saharawi Arab Democratic Republic (SADR) at the invitation of President Mohamed Abdelaziz of SADR who is also Secretary-General of the Polisario Front. In the course of the visit to the Liberated Territories in the SADR, the Polisario Front donated to the ANC and the South-West African People's Organisation (SWAPO) a substantial quantity of arms and ammunition captured from Moroccan troops. This gesture alone to the South African primary liberation movement signified the enduring bonds forged in difficult circumstances that the two countries and peoples share to this day. During this visit, Tambo said the following of his visit to SADR: "The warmth of the popular welcome from the Saharawi people is very different from all other welcomes we have received anywhere else in the world…We are also very surprised by the similarity of the nature of the struggle of the Sahrawi people and the people of South Africa. The visit to the SADR provided concrete confirmation of realities of which we are vaguely aware. One important thing we observed was the respect and support of the Saharawi people towards the struggle of the South African and Namibian people for national independence."

== Diplomatic relations ==
Shortly after the inauguration of the first South African post-apartheid government in 1994, the former South African President Nelson Mandela, announced a decision by the South African government of its intention to recognise and establish diplomatic relations with the Sahrawi Arab Democratic Republic consistent with the earlier decisions of the OAU which South Africa formally joined in 1994.

In June 1995, Nelson Mandela promised that links would be established, and this was subsequently confirmed by Foreign Minister Alfred Nzo and South Africa's OAU ambassador. However, the government delayed implementing its promise to recognise the Sahrawi Republic.

On 15 September 2004, SADR and South Africa formally established diplomatic relations. On 16 September 2004, the former President of South Africa Thabo Mbeki declared that: "It is a matter of great shame and regret to all of us that (nevertheless) the issue of self-determination for the people of Western Sahara remains unresolved. This presents all of us with the challenge to ensure that we do everything possible to ensure that these sister people also enjoy this fundamental and inalienable right, whose defence by the entirety of our continent brought us our own freedom.."

Following South Africa's pronouncement of the recognition of the SADR, the South African government declared that South Africa's recognition was not an end in itself but a means to an end: South Africa thus needs to remain seized with the issue of the illegal occupation of Western Sahara and in support for the Saharawi People's right to self-determination and decolonisation through a UN supervised referendum. The SADR opened an embassy in Pretoria in 2004. Ambassador Mohammed Beissat became the first SADR Ambassador to South Africa. In the same year, the South African Ambassador to Algeria, Ambassador Ratubatsi Super Moloi became the first South African Ambassador to be accredited to the SADR. The freedom of Western Sahara remains a foreign policy priority for South Africa, especially in terms of the sanctity of colonial borders and the recognition of the Saharawi people's right to self-determination.

In June 2013, South African and Sahrawi foreign ministers signed three memorandums of understanding, concerning cooperation, youth sport and demining issues.

== Chronology ==
In July 2006, the South African Department of Foreign Affairs hosted the SADR Chief Spokesperson, Mohamed Khadad, and the Minister for International Co-operation, Mohammed Salem Ould Salek. The South African Department of Foreign Affairs facilitated and continued its humanitarian assistance funding for the SADR through the African Renaissance Fund (ARF).

In November 2006, the South African Department of Foreign Affairs also co-hosted a human rights seminar on the situation in the illegally occupied territory of Western Sahara in co-operation with the South African Human Rights Commission. South African officials also participated in the 32nd annual European Conference for Co-ordinating Support for the Saharawi People, held in Spain.

To strengthen international co-operation, South Africa attended the International Conference of Solidarity with the Saharawi People on the occasion of the commemoration of the 31st Anniversary of the SADR, held in Tifariti from 24 February to 1 March 2007.

In September 2008, the South African Embassy to Algeria and SADR held Diplomatic Consultations with the SADR Minister of Foreign Affairs, Mohammed Ould Salek. From 28 September to 1 November 2008, the South African Department of Foreign Affairs coordinated a Diplomatic Training Programme for SADR Senior Officials.

In October 2008, the South African Embassy to Algeria and SADR held Diplomatic Consultations with the SADR Minister of Culture Khadidja Hamdi.

In December 2008, the South African Department of Foreign Affairs in partnership with the University of Pretoria co-hosted the International Conference on Multilateralism and International Law with Western Sahara as a Case Study in Pretoria, South Africa.

In 2009, President Jacob Zuma in his yearly State of the Nation Address confirmed South Africa's principled position of support for the self-determination and decolonisation for the Western Sahara.

In June 2013, South African Minister of International Relations and Cooperation Maite Nkoana-Mashabane reaffirmed her country position on the decolonization and self-determination of the Saharawi people, stressing the need to urgently convene a referendum to allow Saharawis to choose their destiny.

In the same month in 2018, Brahim Ghali and Cyril Ramaphosa exchanged their conversation in Union Buildings, Pretoria, regarding the deepening of diplomatic relation, regional integration, and security cooperation.

== Diplomatic missions ==
- South Africa has accredited embassy to the SADR in Algiers.
- SADR has an embassy in Pretoria.

== See also ==
- Foreign relations of the Sahrawi Arab Democratic Republic
- Foreign relations of South Africa
- International recognition of the Sahrawi Arab Democratic Republic
