= Sahrawi Arab Democratic Republic–Yugoslavia relations =

Sahrawi Arab Democratic Republic-Yugoslavia relations
- Sahrawi Arab Democratic Republic: Yugoslavia

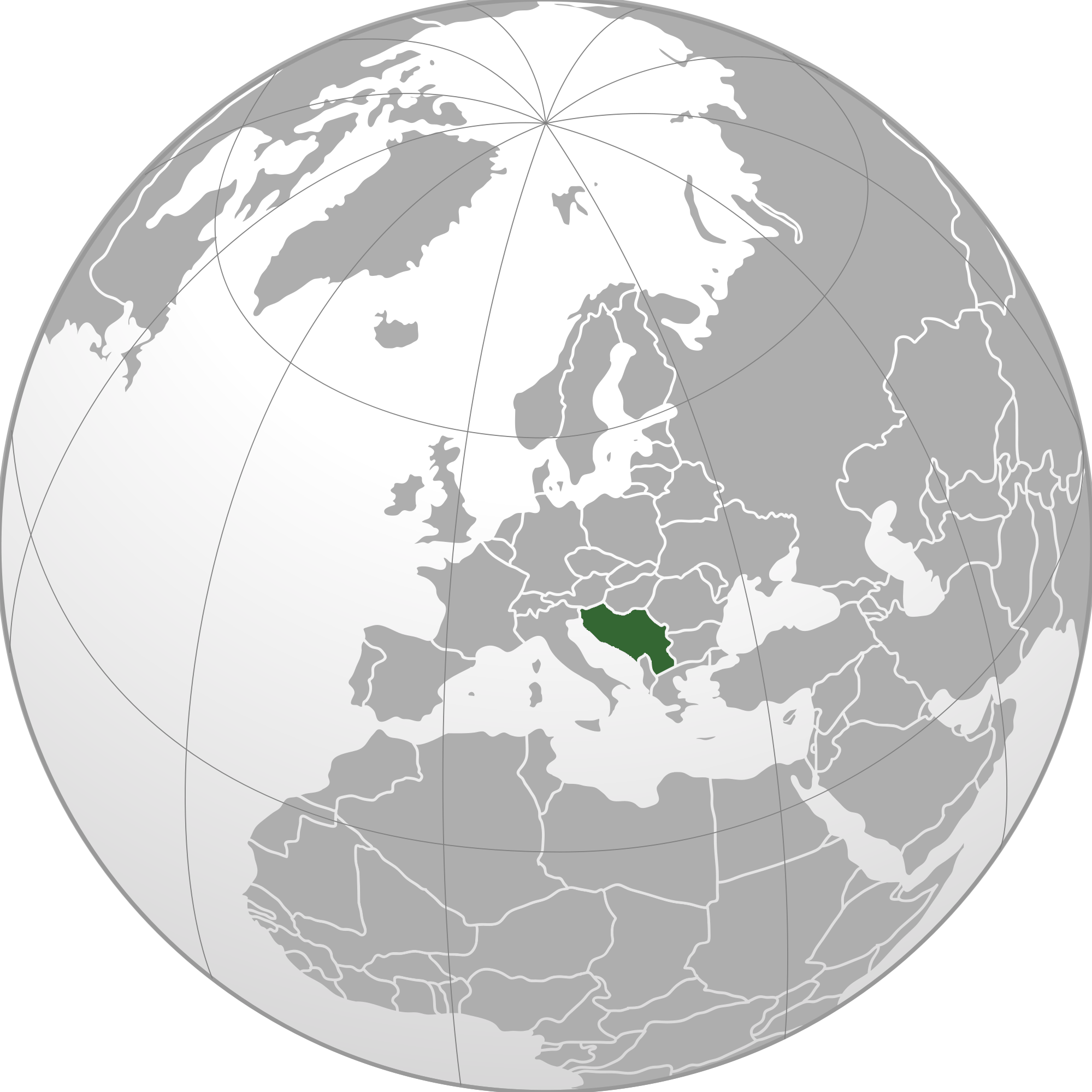
Sahrawi Arab Democratic Republic and Yugoslavia

Sahrawi Arab Democratic Republic–Yugoslavia relations were historical foreign relations between Sahrawi Arab Democratic Republic and now split-up Socialist Federal Republic of Yugoslavia. Yugoslavia recognized the Sahrawi Arab Democratic Republic on 28 November 1984. Yugoslavia was the first (and alongside Albania the only) country in Europe which formally recognized the independence of Sahrawi Republic after some of its allies from the Non-Aligned Movement pressured Belgrade to follow on its earlier policy when Yugoslavia was the first European country to recognize neighboring Algeria as well. While formal relations were limited Yugoslavia extended certain development aid by providing education both for civilians and Polisario members.

Yugoslav decision on recognition was recalled after the breakup of Yugoslavia by Serbia and Montenegro (one of the Yugoslav successor states) in early 2000's which led to development of relations between Serbia and Morocco cantered on the shared views on the status of Western Sahara and Kosovo. At the same time, in 2010 Polisario opened its representative office in Ljubljana, Slovenia (one of Yugoslav successor state) responsible for the whole area of the former Yugoslavia.

== See also ==
- Yugoslavia and the Non-Aligned Movement
- Yugoslavia and the Organisation of African Unity
- Morocco–Yugoslavia relations
- Algeria–Yugoslavia relations
- Death and state funeral of Josip Broz Tito
