= Algeria–Sahrawi Arab Democratic Republic relations =

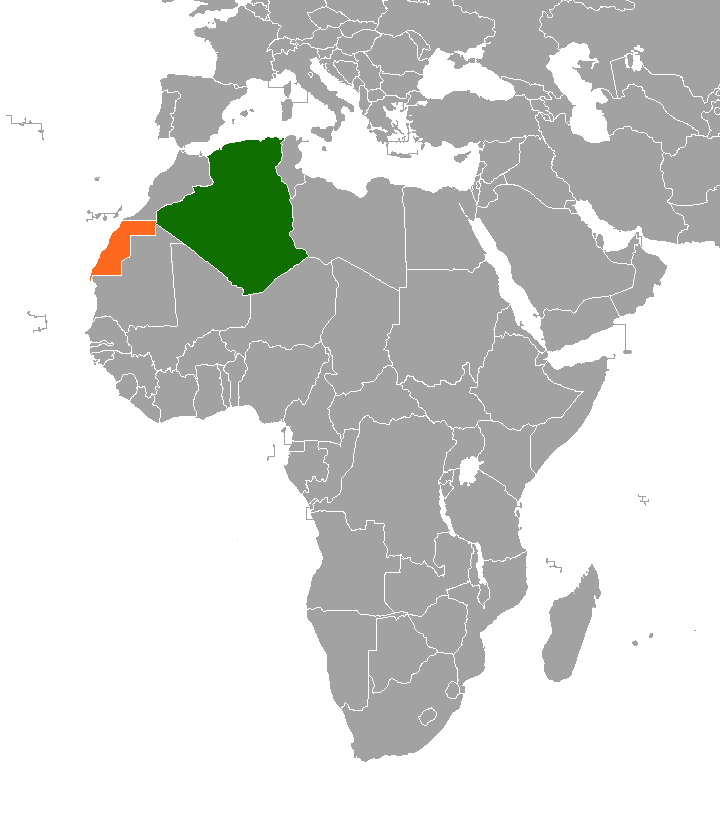

- Algeria: Sahrawi Arab Democratic Republic

Algeria–Sahrawi Arab Democratic Republic relations refers to the current and historical relations between the People’s Democratic Republic of Algeria and the Sahrawi Arab Democratic Republic (SADR).

On 27 February 1976, the Polisario Front proclaimed the formation of the SADR. On 6 March 1976, Algeria recognized the SADR, the third country to do so, and formal diplomatic relations were established soon after. A Sahrawi embassy was opened in Algiers that year. Algeria rejects claims by Morocco to Western Sahara territory, all of which is claimed by the SADR. The SADR government in-exile is located in Tindouf, Algeria.

In February 2022, an “Algeria-Western Sahara” Parliamentary Group of Friendship and Fraternity was installed in the Algerian National People’s Assembly.

== Diplomatic missions ==
- SADR has an embassy in Algiers.

== See also ==
- Foreign relations of Algeria
- Foreign relations of the Sahrawi Arab Democratic Republic
- International recognition of the Sahrawi Arab Democratic Republic
