= List of diplomatic missions to the Sahrawi Arab Democratic Republic =

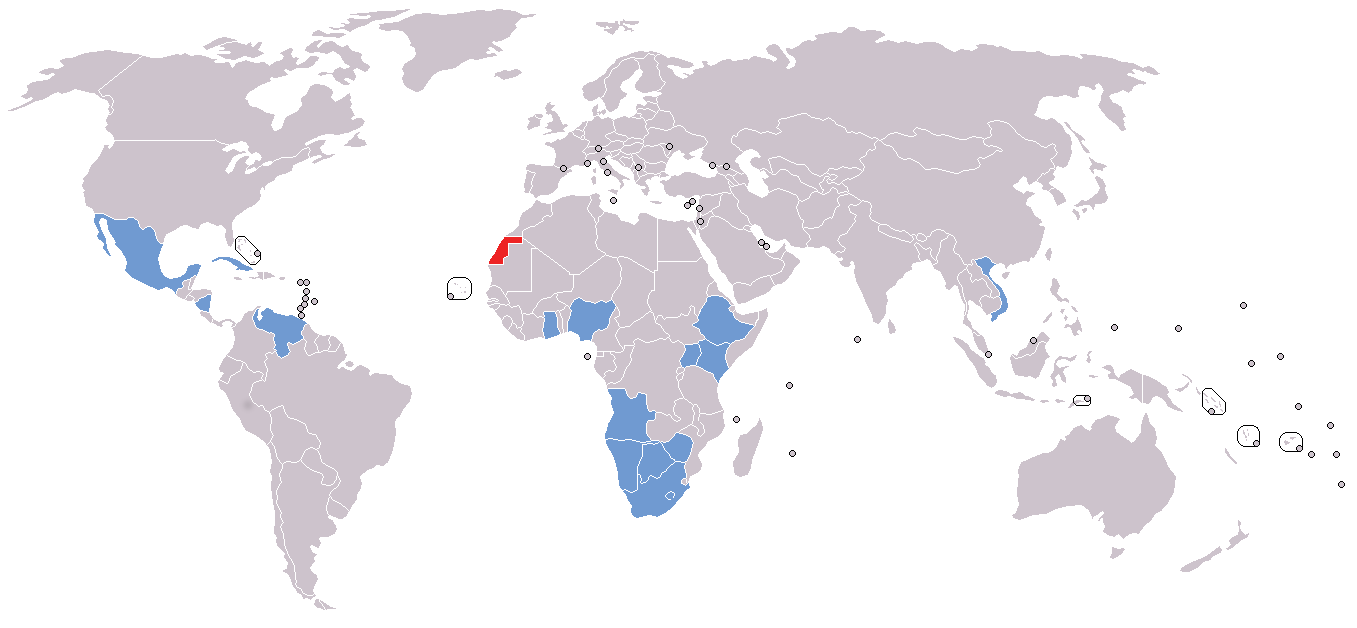
Diplomatic missions to the Sahrawi Arab Democratic Republic (SADR) SADR, as claimed Accredited embassy to SADR

This is a list of diplomatic missions to the Sahrawi Arab Democratic Republic (SADR). The Sahrawi Arab Democratic Republic's government in exile, led by the Polisario Front and headquartered at Camp Rabouni, Algeria, maintains diplomatic relations with 34 states. Some of these states have missions officially accredited to the SADR. (Note: While ambassadors usually presented credentials to the Sahrawi President in Camp Rabuni in Algeria, the Cuban and Namibian ambassadors in March 2018 and the Zimbabwean ambassador in May 2018 presented their credentials to the President in Liberated Territories of SADR (in Bir Lehlou or Tifariti).) As Morocco controls most of the territory claimed by the Sahrawi Republic and amidst the disputed political status of Western Sahara, no embassy is based in Western Sahara, but in neighbouring countries.

== Non-resident embassies ==
- Angola (Algiers)
- Botswana (Addis Ababa)
- Cuba (Algiers)
- Ethiopia (Rome)
- Ghana (Algiers)
- Kenya (Algiers)
- Lesotho (Kuwait City)
- Mexico (New York City)
- Namibia (Algiers)
- Nicaragua (New York City)
- Nigeria (Algiers)
- South Africa (Algiers)
- Uganda (Tripoli)
- Venezuela (Algiers)
- Vietnam (Algiers)
- Zimbabwe (Algiers)

== See also ==
- Foreign relations of the Sahrawi Arab Democratic Republic
- List of diplomatic missions of the Sahrawi Arab Democratic Republic
