= List of diplomatic missions of the Sahrawi Arab Democratic Republic =

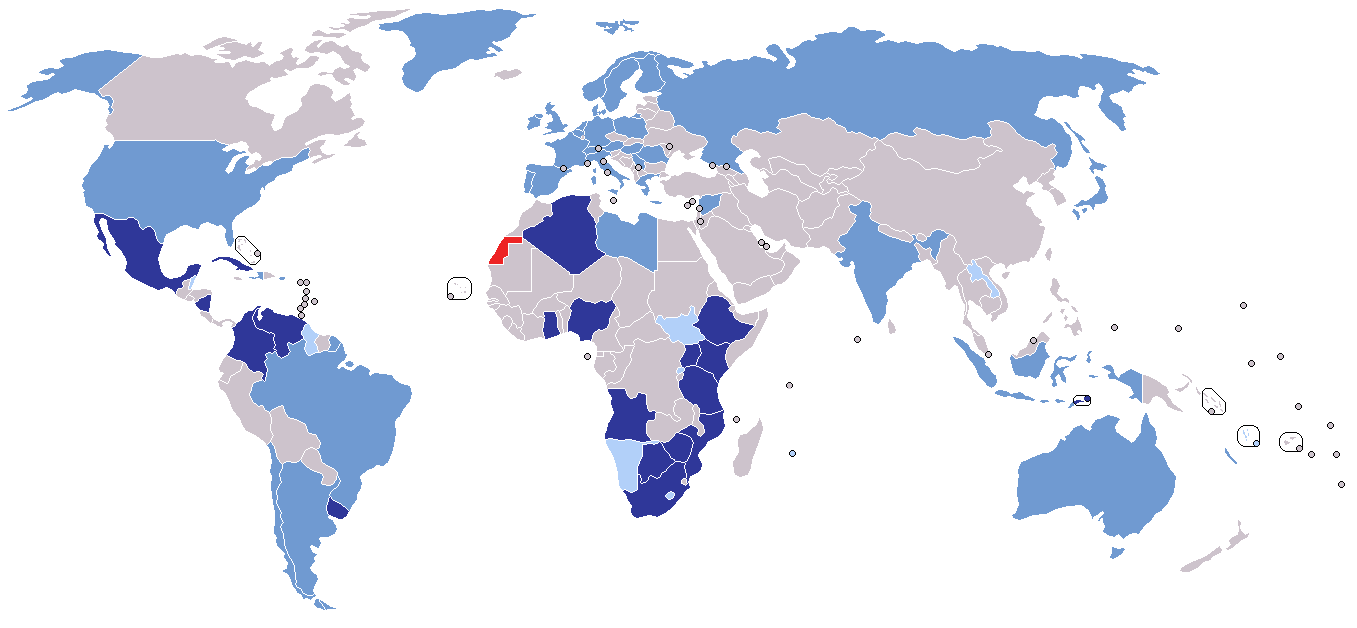
Diplomatic missions of the Sahrawi Arab Democratic Republic (SADR) SADR, as claimed SADR embassy SADR representation office SADR embassy, non-resident

This is a list of diplomatic missions of the Sahrawi Arab Democratic Republic (SADR). The Sahrawi Arab Democratic Republic's government in exile, led by the Polisario Front and headquartered at Camp Rabouni, Algeria, maintains diplomatic relations with 34 states, and has a small diplomatic network overseas. Due to Morocco's claim of sovereignty over the Western Sahara, which it calls the Southern Provinces, the SADR does not enjoy wide recognition. Most of the embassies of the SADR are in Africa and Latin America. Some embassies have multiple accreditation. (Note: SADR embassies are accredited also to Belize, Guyana, Laos, Lesotho, Liberia, Mauritius, Namibia, Rwanda, South Sudan and Vanuatu.) In addition, SADR (Polisario Front) maintains an extensive network of representatives in countries that do not recognise the SADR as a sovereign state. (Note: In July 2007 Parliament of Italy called Government for the recognition of diplomatic status of the Polisario Front representation office in Italy.)

== Current missions ==
=== Africa ===
- Algeria
  - Algiers (Embassy)
  - Oran (Consulate)
- Angola
  - Luanda (Embassy, Embassy for Namibia)
- Botswana
  - Gaborone (Embassy)
- Ethiopia
  - Addis Ababa (Embassy, Embassy for South Sudan)
- Ghana
  - Accra (Embassy)
- Kenya
  - Nairobi (Embassy)
- Libya
  - Tripoli (General Delegation)
- Mozambique
  - Maputo (Embassy)
- Nigeria
  - Abuja (Embassy)
- South Africa
  - Pretoria (Embassy) (Note: Also accredited to Lesotho.)
- Tanzania
  - Dar-es-Salaam (Embassy, Embassy for Mauritius)
- Uganda
  - Kampala (Embassy, Embassy for Rwanda)
- Zimbabwe
  - Harare (Embassy)

=== Americas ===
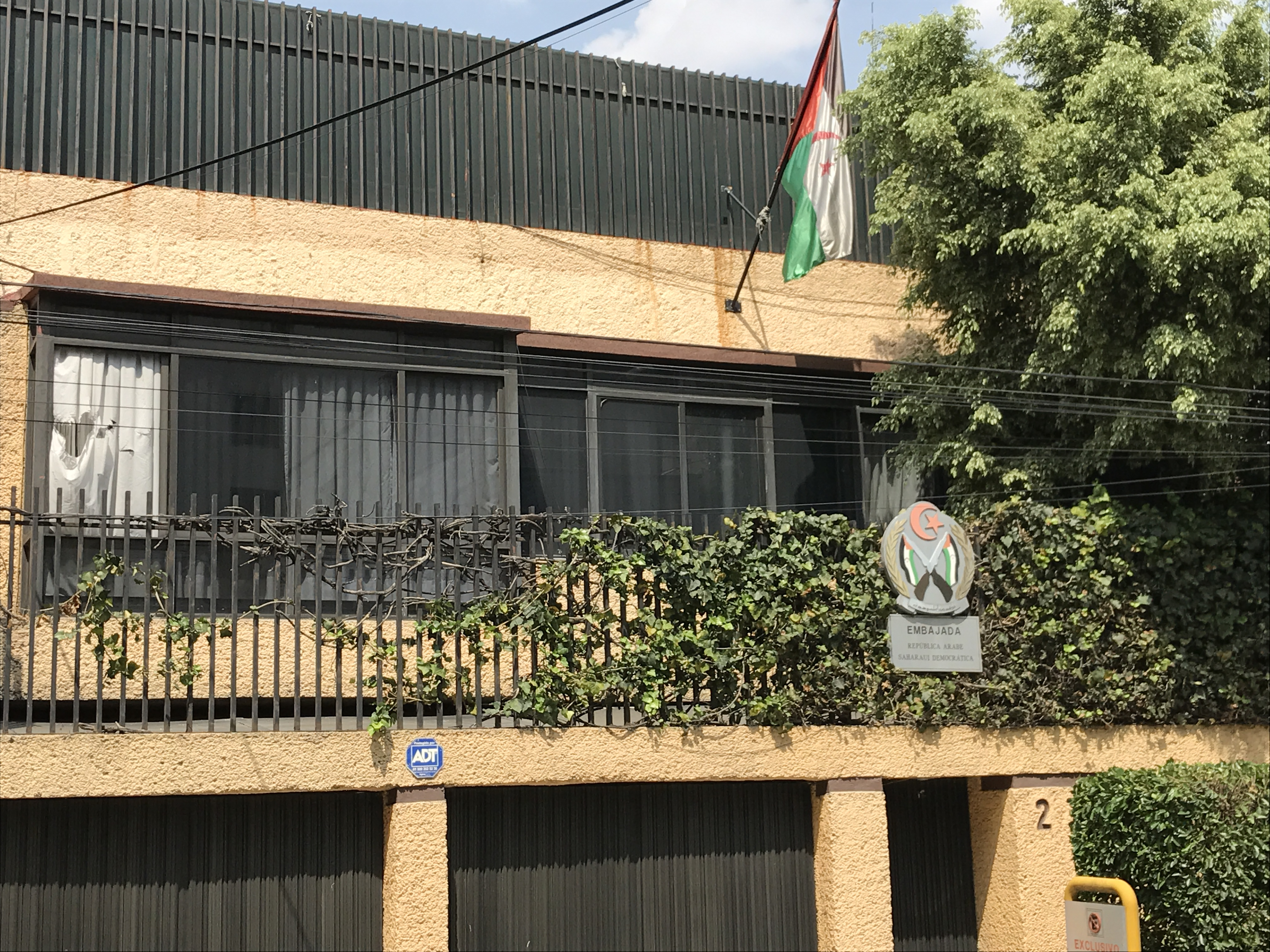
Embassy in Mexico City

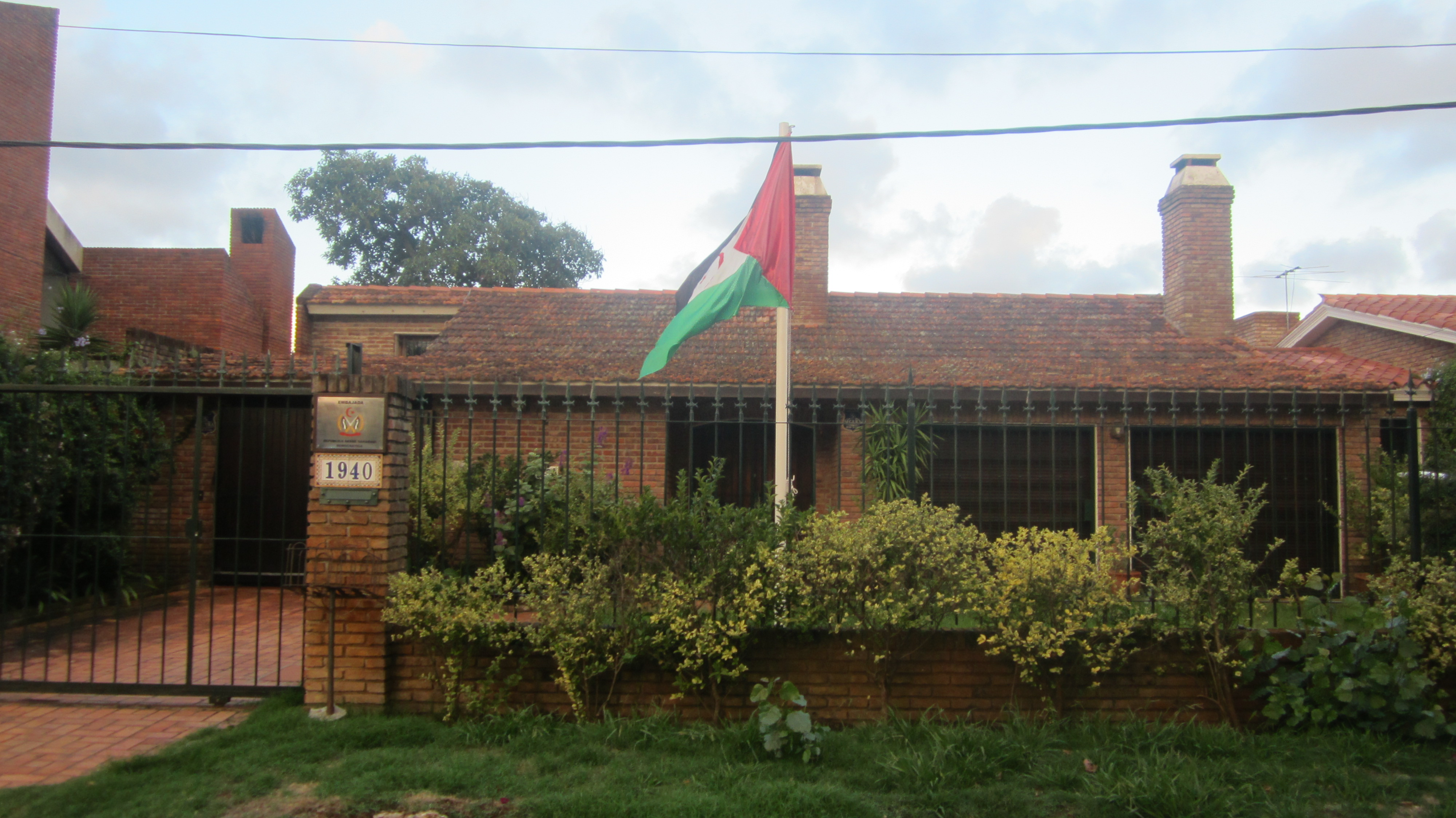
Embassy in Montevideo

- Argentina
  - Buenos Aires (Mission)
- Brazil
  - Brasília (Mission)
- Chile
  - Santiago de Chile (Mission)
- Colombia
  - Bogotá (Embassy)
- Cuba
  - Havana (Embassy)
- Ecuador
  - Quito (Embassy)
- Haiti
  - Port-au-Prince (Mission)
- Mexico
  - Mexico City (Embassy)
- Nicaragua
  - Managua (Embassy, Embassy for Belize)
- Uruguay
  - Montevideo (Embassy)
- Venezuela
  - Caracas (Embassy, Embassy for Guyana)

=== Asia ===
- India
  - New Delhi (Representation Office for India, Embassy for Laos)
- Indonesia
  - Jakarta (Representation Office)
- Japan
  - Tokyo (Representation Office)
- Syria
  - Damascus (General Delegation)
- Timor-Leste
  - Dili (Embassy, Embassy for Vanuatu)

=== Europe ===
- Austria
  - Vienna (Representation Office)
- Belgium
  - Brussels (Representation Office)
- Denmark
  - Copenhagen (Representation Office)
- Finland
  - Helsinki (Representation Office)
- France
  - Bagnolet (Paris) (Representation Office)
- Germany
  - Berlin (Representation Office)
  - Bremen (Representation Office)
- Greece
  - Athens (Representation Office)
- Hungary
  - Budapest (Representation Office)
- Ireland
  - Dublin (Representation Office)
- Italy
  - Rome (Representation Office)
  - Sesto Fiorentino (Representation Office)
- Netherlands
  - The Hague (Representation Office)
- Norway
  - Oslo (Representation Office)
- Poland
  - Warsaw (Representation Office)
- Portugal
  - Lisbon (Representation Office)
- Romania
  - Bucharest (Representation Office)
- Russia
  - Moscow (Representation Office)
- Serbia
  - Belgrade (Representation Office)
- Spain
  - Madrid (Delegation)
  - Barcelona (Delegation)
  - Vitoria-Gasteiz (Delegation)
- Sweden
  - Stockholm (Representation Office)
- Switzerland
  - Geneva (Representation Office)
- United Kingdom
  - London (Representation Office)

=== Oceania ===
- Australia
  - Glebe (Sydney) (Representation Office)

=== Multilateral organisations ===
- Addis Ababa (Permanent Mission to the African Union)
- Brussels (SADR Office to the European Union)
- Geneva (SADR Office to the United Nations)
- New York City (SADR Office to the United Nations)

== Closed missions ==
Host country	Host city	Mission	Year closed	Ref.
Guinea-Bissau	Bissau	Embassy	2010	
India	New Delhi	Embassy (Note: Continues as a representation office.)	2000	
Madagascar	Antananarivo	Embassy	2005	
Peru	Lima	Embassy	2023	

== See also ==
- Foreign relations of the Sahrawi Arab Democratic Republic
- List of diplomatic missions to the Sahrawi Arab Democratic Republic
