= Panama–Sahrawi Arab Democratic Republic relations =

- Panama: Sahrawi Arab Democratic Republic

Panama–Sahrawi Arab Democratic Republic relations refers to the former historical relations between the Republic of Panama and the Sahrawi Arab Democratic Republic (SADR). Panama was the first state of The Americas to recognize the SADR in July 1978, formal diplomatic relations were established on 1 June 1979. A Sahrawi embassy (the first on the American continent) was opened in Panama City in 1980, during the Arístides Royo government.

== History ==
On 27 June 2007, President of the SADR Mohamed Abdelaziz received the press-attaché of the Foreign Minister of Panama.

In 2009, the Inter-Parliamentary Friendship Group was established for the exchange of legislative experience.

On 4 June 2009, Ali Mahamud Embarek presented his credentials as the new Ambassador of the Sahrawi Arab Democratic Republic in Panama.

On 17 March 2010, Vice President of Panama Juan Carlos Varela and the Sahrawi Delegate Minister in Charge of Latin America Hash Ahmed signed a cultural and educational cooperation convention, giving Sahrawi students and professionals the opportunity of travelling to Panama to make advanced, specialized and grade studies. In September 2011, the Foreign Minister of Panama Roberto Henriquez while meeting the SADR Ambassador in Panama, stressed the importance of cooperation that both countries conducted in education and culture.

In September 2012, The Saharawi Ambassador was received by the Dean of Panama's Chiriquì University, Héctor Requena Núñez, during a visit made by the Ambassador to the university. The university provides scholarships for Sahrawi students. Sahrawi students were studying medicine in Panama at the time of the visit. Panama was the first Latin American country to host Sahrawi students in its universities.

On 4 April 2013, Foreign Minister Fernando Nunez Fabrega accepted the visit of the SADR Ambassador in Panama, Ali Mahamud Embarek. During the ceremonial hearing held in the Palacio Bolivar headquarters Foreign Ministry, the Saharawi diplomat reiterated the desire of Sahrawi authorities to continue strengthening diplomatic ties between the two nations. But on 20 November 2013 the Panamanian government decided to suspend diplomatic relations with the Sahrawi Arab Democratic Republic.

On 18 December 2014, new Vice President of Panama Isabel Saint Malo de Alvarado received Sahrawi Minister of Foreign Affairs Mohamed Salem Ould Salek. The Sahrawi minister expressed the SADR's interest in restoring diplomatic relations between the two countries and reopening the Saharawi embassy in Panama.

Diplomatic relations were restored on 7 January 2016.

Diplomatic relations were suspended again on 21 November 2024.

In September 2026, Panama reiterated its support for Moroccan sovereignty over Western Sahara.

== International agreements ==
- Cultural and educational cooperation convention, signed on 17 March 2010, entered into force on 2 November 2010.
