= Cuba–Sahrawi Arab Democratic Republic relations =

- Cuba: Sahrawi Arab Democratic Republic

Cuba–Sahrawi Arab Democratic Republic relations refers to the current and historical relations between the Republic of Cuba and the Sahrawi Arab Democratic Republic (SADR). Cuba recognized the SADR on 20 January 1980, formal diplomatic relations were established on 30 January 1980. A Sahrawi embassy was opened in Havana in April 1980, and the Cuban embassy in Algiers was accredited to the SADR.

Cuba cooperates with the Sahrawi Republic educating Sahrawi students (mostly on health-related careers), and sending Cuban medical brigades to the Sahrawi refugee camps. Nearly 4,000 Sahrawi students had graduated from Cuban schools since 1977.
