= Mohamed Salama Badi =

Western Sahara politician and diplomatic

His Excellency Mohamed Salama Badi محمد سلامة بادي
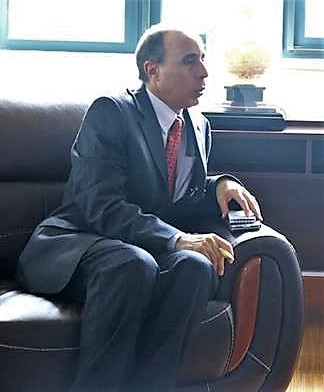

Sahrawi Ambassador to East Timor
- Incumbent
- Assumed office August 2010
- Prime Minister: Abdelkader Taleb Omar
- Preceded by: Mohamed Kamal Fadel

Personal details
- Born: 1966 (age 59–60) El Aaiun, Spanish Sahara
- Party: POLISARIO
- Education: University of Sétif, Algeria
- Occupation: Diplomat

Mohamed Salama Badi (born 1966 in El Aaiun, Western Sahara) is the current Sahrawi ambassador to Timor-Leste. He speaks Hassaniya (a variety of Arabic), and Spanish.

== Personal life ==
He was an activist and syndicalist in Moroccan-occupied Western Sahara during his youth. He graduated in Economics at Sétif university, in Algeria. He then moved to Spain to complete his education, earning a master's degree in "Conflicts, Peace and Development" at James I University in Castellon and a doctorate at the University of Granada.

== Diplomatic postings ==
He started his diplomatic career during the 1990s, as the head of the Sahrawi Arab Democratic Republic general delegation in Syria. Then, in the late 2000s, he joined the Pan-African Parliament in representation of his country. Finally, in 2010 he replaced Mohamed Kamal Fadel as ambassador of the SADR to Timor-Leste.

== Honours and awards ==
On 16 May 2012, Salama Badi was awarded with the Order of Timor-Leste by President of East Timor José Ramos-Horta.

Award or decoration	Country	Date	Place	Note	Ref
Medal of the Order of Timor-Leste	East Timor	16 May 2012	Dili	East Timorese highest honour.	
