= Nigeria–Sahrawi Arab Democratic Republic relations =

- Nigeria: Sahrawi Arab Democratic Republic

Nigeria–Sahrawi Arab Democratic Republic relations refers to the current and historical relations between the Federal Republic of Nigeria and the Sahrawi Arab Democratic Republic (SADR). Nigeria recognized the SADR on 11 November 1984, and formal diplomatic relations were established on the same day. A Sahrawi embassy was opened in Abuja in late 2000 by the Olusegun Obasanjo government.
