= Mohamed Kamal Fadel =

Western Sahara politician

Mohamed Kamal Fadel محمد فاضل كمال

Polisario Front Representative to Australia
- Incumbent
- Assumed office 1999
- Prime Minister: Bouchraya Hammoudi Bayoun; Abdelkader Taleb Omar

Sahrawi Ambassador to East Timor
- In office April 2009 – August 2010
- Prime Minister: Abdelkader Taleb Omar
- Succeeded by: Mohamed Salama Badi

Personal details
- Party: POLISARIO
- Education: University of Kent, United Kingdom
- Occupation: Diplomat

Mohamed Kamal Fadel is the Polisario Front representative of the Sahrawi Arab Democratic Republic (SADR) to Australia & New Zealand. He had worked since 1986 in several diplomatic postings, such as SADR embassies or representations on Algeria, India, Iran, the United Kingdom & East Timor. In 1999 he was appointed as Sahrawi representative to Australia & New Zealand and also as roving ambassador for the South Pacific region. He holds an MA in International Relations from the University of Kent, United Kingdom. He speaks Hassaniya (a variety of Arabic), English, French and Spanish.

== Diplomatic postings ==
- 1995–1999 Adjunt POLISARIO representative for the United Kingdom & Ireland
- 1999–current POLISARIO representative for Australia & New Zealand
- 2009–2010 SADR ambassador for East Timor
