= Minister of Foreign Affairs (Sahrawi Arab Democratic Republic) =

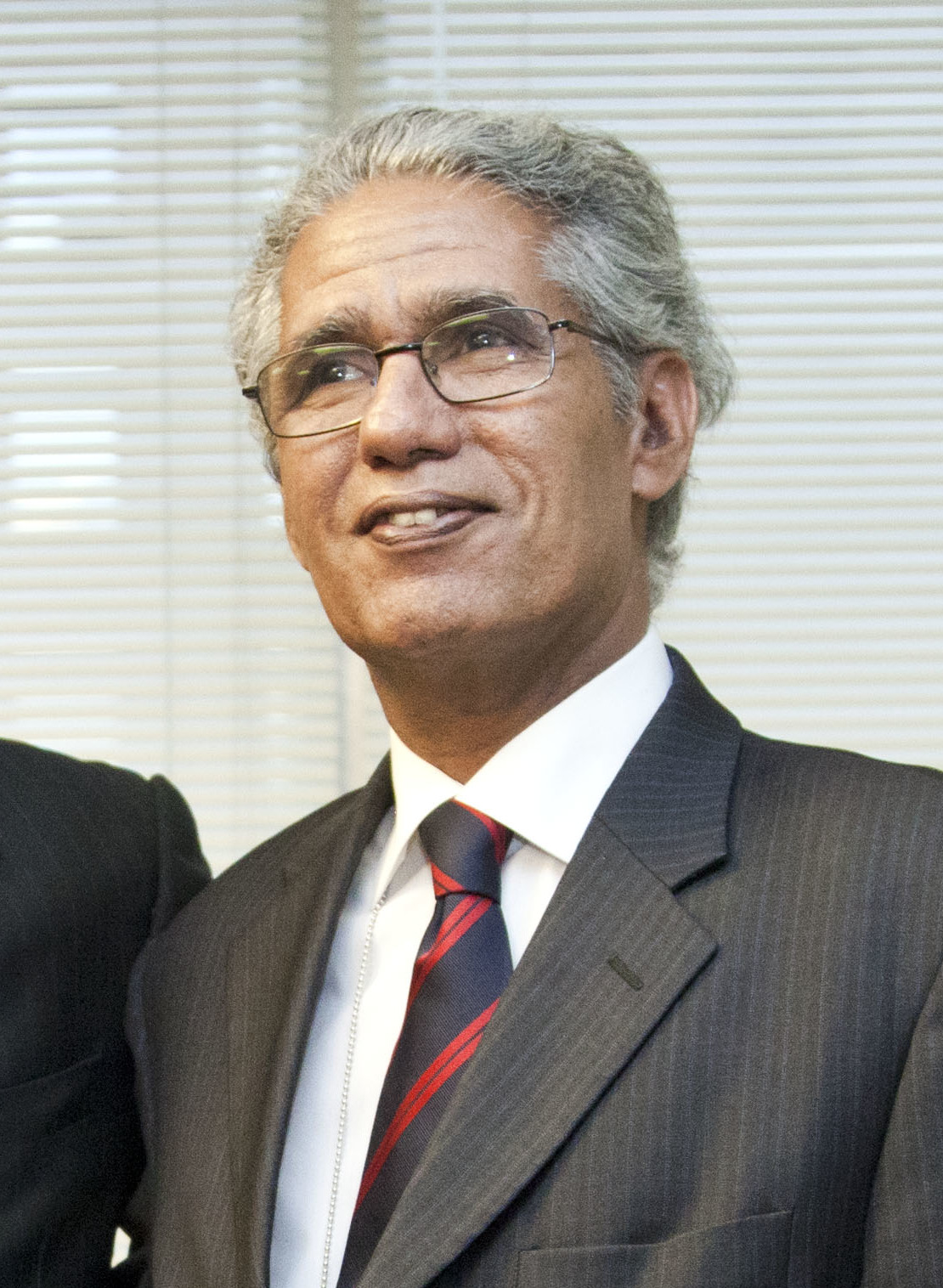
Mohamed Salem Ould Salek, Former Minister of Foreign Affairs of the Sahrawi Arab Democratic Republic, in 2013.

This is a list of foreign ministers of the Sahrawi Arab Democratic Republic.

- 1976–1985: Ibrahim Hakim
- 1985–1988: Mansur Umar
- 1988–1995: Mohamed Salem Ould Salek
- 1995–1997: Malainine Sadik
- 1997–1998: Bachir Mustafa Sayed
- 1998–2023: Mohamed Salem Ould Salek
- 2023–2025: Mohamed Sidati
- 2025–present: Mohamed Yeslem Beissat

== Sources ==
- Rulers.org – Foreign ministers S–Z
